= 1303 conclave =

Election of Catholic Pope Benedict XI

Papal conclave October 1303

Dates and location
- 21–22 October 1303; Vatican Palace, Rome

Key officials
- Dean: Giovanni Boccamazza
- Camerlengo: Teodorico Ranieri
- Protodeacon: Matteo Rosso Orsini

Election
- Ballots: 1

Elected pope
- Niccolò Boccasini; Name taken: Benedict XI
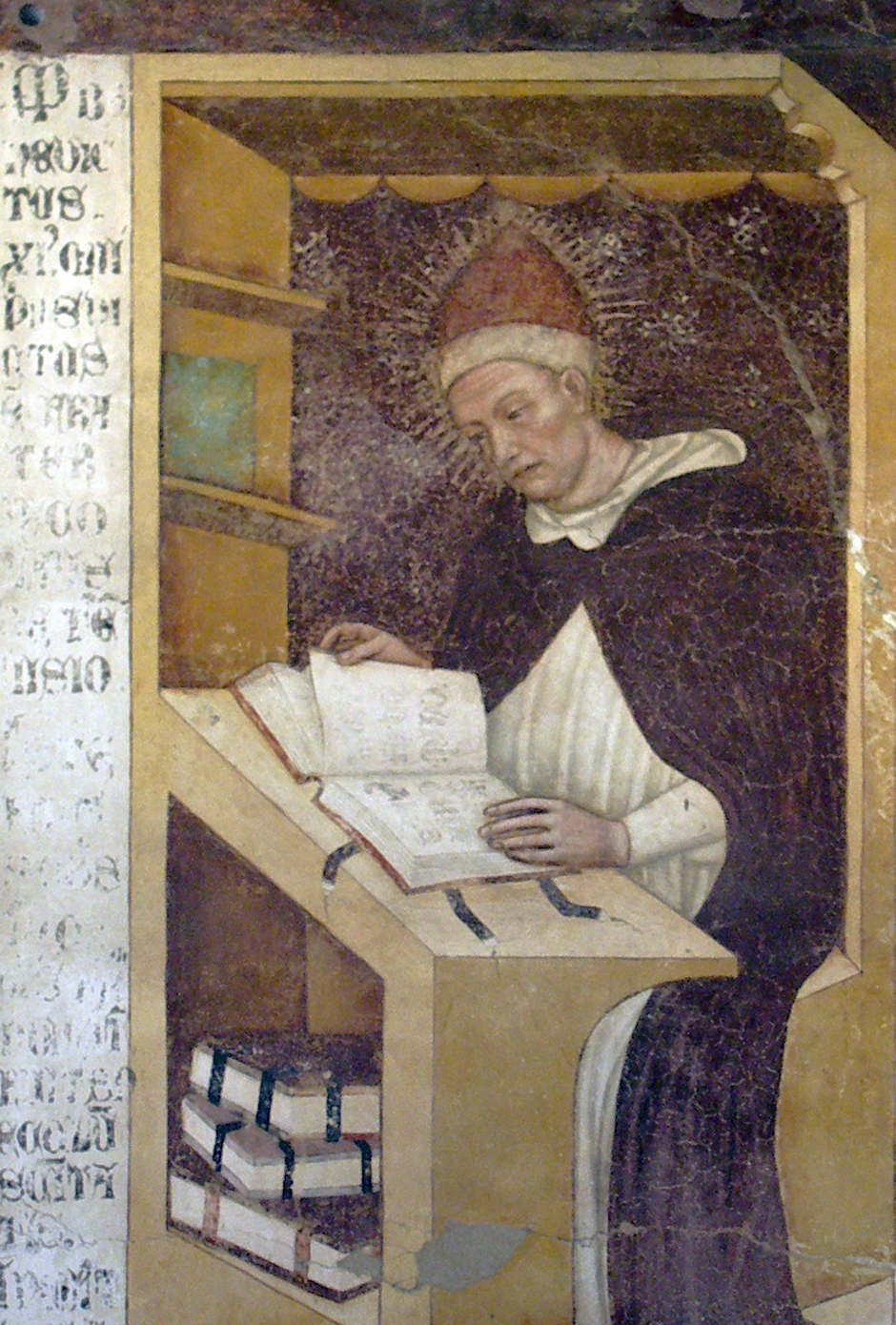

In the 1303 papal conclave, Benedict XI was elected to succeed Boniface VIII as pope.

== Proceedings ==
Pope Boniface VIII was buried at St. Peter's Basilica on 12 October 1303, in a tomb which he had prepared for himself. The manhandling of Boniface VIII by the forces of France and the Colonna family before his death gave the cardinals second thoughts about electing anyone hostile to the interests of Philip IV of France.

The Conclave took place at the Vatican Palace next to St. Peter's, where Pope Boniface VIII had died on 11 October 1303. The Conclave began with the Mass of the Holy Spirit on 21 October, and voting began the next morning. A Dominican, and the Order's former Master General (1296–1298), Niccolò Boccasini was unanimously elected Pope Benedict XI on the first scrutiny. Niccolò Boccasini and Pedro Rodriguez were the only cardinals, of the seventeen or eighteen, who had stayed with Boniface VIII at Anagni when the papal residence was invaded by the French and the Colonna, and the Pope seized and imprisoned. Benedict's choice of numbering indicates that Antipope Benedict X was considered a legitimate pope at that time. Benedict XI was crowned at the Vatican Basilica on Sunday, 27 October 1303 by Cardinal Matteo Rosso Orsini, the prior Diaconorum.

The new pope, Niccolò Boccasini of Treviso, was Italian but not Roman, and thus considered neutral in the disputes between the Roman clans, and the international struggle between Charles II and Philip IV. Benedict XI refused to excommunicate Philip IV or the Colonna, but also refused to restore to the Colonna their properties that had been seized by Boniface VIII.

Pope Benedict left a detailed account of the conclave that elected him, describing how it closely adhered to the procedures mandated in the papal bull Ubi periculum.

== Cardinal electors ==
Elector	Nationality	Cardinalatial order and title	Elevated	Elevator	Other ecclesiastical titles	Notes
Giovanni Boccamazza	Rome	Cardinal-bishop of Frascati	1285, December 22	Honorius IV	Dean of the College of Cardinals	nephew of Pope Honorius IV
Niccolò Boccasini	Treviso	Cardinal-Priest of Santa Sabina	1298, December 4	Boniface VIII		
Teodorico Ranieri	Orvieto	Cardinal-bishop of Palestrina	1298, December 4	Boniface VIII	Camerlengo	
Leonardo Patrasso	Guarcino	Cardinal-bishop of Albano	1300, March 2	Boniface VIII		Nephew of Boniface VIII
Pedro Rodríguez	Spanish	Cardinal-bishop of Sabina	1302, December 15	Boniface VIII	Legate in Sabina	
Giovanni Minio da Morrovalle, O.F.M.	Marche	Cardinal-bishop of Porto e Santa Rufina	1302, December 15	Boniface VIII		Former minister general of the Order of Franciscans (1296–1304)
Niccolò Alberti, O.P.	Prato	Cardinal-bishop of Ostia e Velletri	1303, December 18	Benedict XI		
Robert de Pontigny, O.Cist.	French	Cardinal-priest of S. Pudenziana	1294, September 18	Celestine V	Protopriest; Camerlengo of the College of Cardinals	Former Superior General of the Cistercian Order (1294)
Gentile Partino, O.F.M.	Guarcino	Cardinal-priest of Ss. Silvestro e Martino ai Monti	1300, March 2	Boniface VIII	Grand penitentiary	Nephew of Boniface VIII
Walter Winterburn, O.P.	English	Cardinal-priest of S. Sabina	1304, February 19	Benedict XI		
Napoleone Orsini Frangipani	Rome	Cardinal-deacon of S. Adriano	1288, May 16	Nicholas IV	Archpriest of the Liberian Basilica	Nephew of Pope Nicholas III
Landolfo Brancaccio	Neapolitan	Cardinal-deacon of S. Angelo in Pescheria	1294, September 18	Celestine V		
Guglielmo de Longhi	Bergamo	Cardinal-deacon of S. Nicola in Carcere Tulliano	1294, September 18	Celestine V		Former Chancellor to Charles II of Naples
Francesco Napoleone Orsini	Rome	Cardinal-deacon of S. Lucia in Orthea (Silice)	1295, December 17	Boniface VIII		
Francesco Caetani	Anagni	Cardinal-deacon of S. Maria in Cosmedin	1295, December 17	Boniface VIII		Cardinal-nephew
Luca Fieschi	Genoese	Cardinal-deacon of S. Maria in Via Lata	1300, March 2	Boniface VIII		Nephew of Adrian V and grand-nephew of Innocent IV

Two other cardinals, Giacomo and Pietro Colonna (uncle and nephew), had been deposed by Pope Boniface VIII and were thus ineligible to participate in the election.
