= 1304–1305 conclave =

Election of Catholic Pope Clement V

Papal conclave 1304–05

Dates and location
- 10/17 July 1304 – 5 June 1305; Perugia Cathedral, Perugia

Key officials
- Dean: Giovanni Boccamazza
- Camerlengo: Teodorico Ranieri
- Protodeacon: Matteo Rosso Orsini

Elected pope
- Raymond de Got; Name taken: Clement V
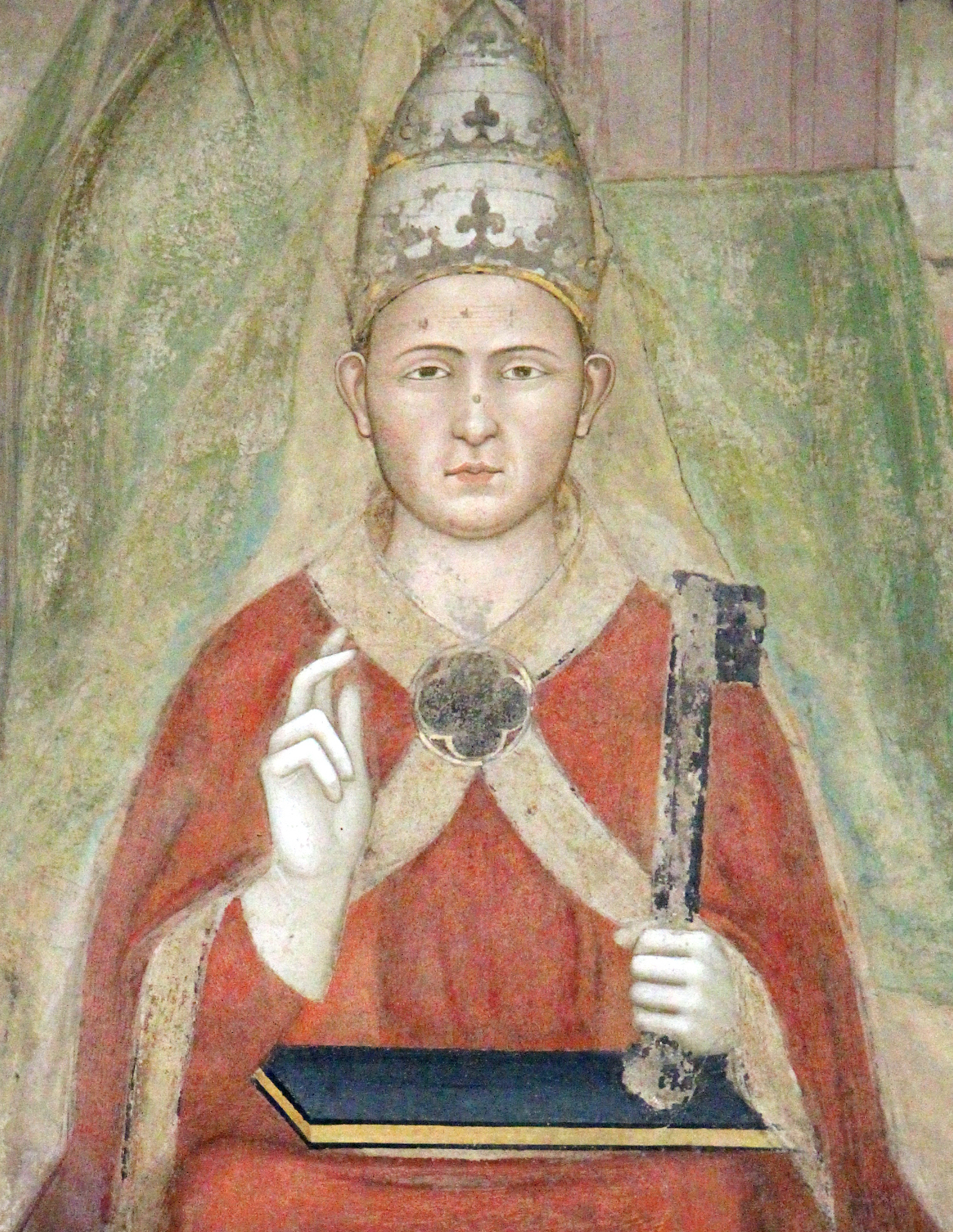

The 1304–1305 papal conclave was initiated after the death of Pope Benedict XI in July 1304. It took place in Perugia, the city in which Benedict XI had died, and proved to be a protracted affair. It ran from 10 or 17 July 1304 to 5 June 1305, and ultimately elected the non-cardinal Raymond de Got as Pope Clement V. At the time of his election, de Got was the archbishop of Bordeaux and thus a subject of King Edward I of England (who had recently conquered Normandy), although he was a childhood friend of King Philip IV of France ("the Fair"). Pope Clement V's decision to relocate the papacy to France was one of the most contested issues in the conclave following his 1314 death, during which the minority of Italian cardinals were unable to engineer the return of the papacy to Rome. This immediately preceded the beginning of the Avignon Papacy.

== Cardinal electors ==
In 1304, Rome was in disorder due to the ongoing conflict between the Colonna and the Orsini. As soon as Holy Week was over, Benedict XI withdrew to Perugia to escape the violence; he died in Perugia that summer, probably of dysentery. As the Curia had accompanied the Pope, the conclave was held in the city where he died.

Of the 19 living cardinals, only 15 were present in the conclave. Exactly 10 of these, constituting the minimum two-thirds necessary, voted for Bertrand de Got, who became Clement V. Two other cardinals, Giacomo and Pietro Colonna (uncle and nephew), had been deposed by Pope Boniface VIII and were thus ineligible to participate in the election; their cardinalates were subsequently restored by Clement V.

Elector	Diocese	Cardinalatial order and title	Elevated	Elevator	Other ecclesiastical titles	Notes
Giovanni Boccamazza	Rome	Cardinal-bishop of Frascati	1285, December 22	Honorius IV	Dean of the College of Cardinals	nephew of Pope Honorius IV
Teodorico Ranieri	Orvieto	Cardinal-bishop of Palestrina	1298, December 4	Boniface VIII	Camerlengo	
Leonardo Patrasso	Guarcino	Cardinal-bishop of Albano	1300, March 2	Boniface VIII		Nephew of Boniface VIII
Pedro Rodríguez	Spanish	Cardinal-bishop of Sabina	1302, December 15	Boniface VIII	Legate in Sabina	
Giovanni Minio da Morrovalle, O.F.M.	Marche	Cardinal-bishop of Porto e Santa Rufina	1302, December 15	Boniface VIII		Former minister general of the Order of Franciscans (1296-1304)
Niccolò Alberti, O.P.	Prato	Cardinal-bishop of Ostia e Velletri	1303, December 18	Benedict XI		
Robert de Pontigny, O.Cist.	French	Cardinal-priest of S. Pudenziana	1294, September 18	Celestine V	Protopriest; Camerlengo of the College of Cardinals	Former Superior General of the Cistercian Order (1294)
Gentile Partino, O.F.M.	Guarcino	Cardinal-priest of Ss. Silvestro e Martino ai Monti	1300, March 2	Boniface VIII	Grand penitentiary	Nephew of Boniface VIII
Walter Winterburn, O.P.	English	Cardinal-priest of S. Sabina	1304, February 19	Benedict XI		
Napoleone Orsini Frangipani	Rome	Cardinal-deacon of S. Adriano	1288, May 16	Nicholas IV	Archpriest of the Liberian Basilica	Nephew of Pope Nicholas III
Landolfo Brancaccio	Neapolitan	Cardinal-deacon of S. Angelo in Pescheria	1294, September 18	Celestine V		
Guglielmo de Longhi	Bergamo	Cardinal-deacon of S. Nicola in Carcere Tulliano	1294, September 18	Celestine V		Former Chancellor to Charles II of Naples
Francesco Napoleone Orsini	Rome	Cardinal-deacon of S. Lucia in Orthea (Silice)	1295, December 17	Boniface VIII		
Francesco Caetani	Anagni	Cardinal-deacon of S. Maria in Cosmedin	1295, December 17	Boniface VIII		Cardinal-nephew
Luca Fieschi	Genoese	Cardinal-deacon of S. Maria in Via Lata	1300, March 2	Boniface VIII		Nephew of Adrian V and grand-nephew of Innocent IV

=== Absentee cardinals ===
All four cardinals left early as a result of illness.

Elector	Diocese	Cardinalatial order and title	Elevated	Elevator	Other ecclesiastical titles	Notes
Jean Le Moine	French	Cardinal-priest of Ss. Marcellino e Pietro	1294, September 18	Celestine V		
Matteo Rosso Orsini	Rome	Cardinal-deacon of S. Maria in Portico	1262, May 22	Urban IV	Protodeacon; archpriest of the Vatican Basilica; Cardinal-protector of the Order of Franciscans	Nephew of Pope Nicholas III
Giacomo Gaetani Stefaneschi	Rome	Cardinal-deacon of S. Giorgio in Velabro	1295, December 17	Boniface VIII		Nephew of Boniface VIII
Riccardo Petroni	Siena	Cardinal-deacon of S. Eustachio	1298, December 4	Boniface VIII		

== Politics ==
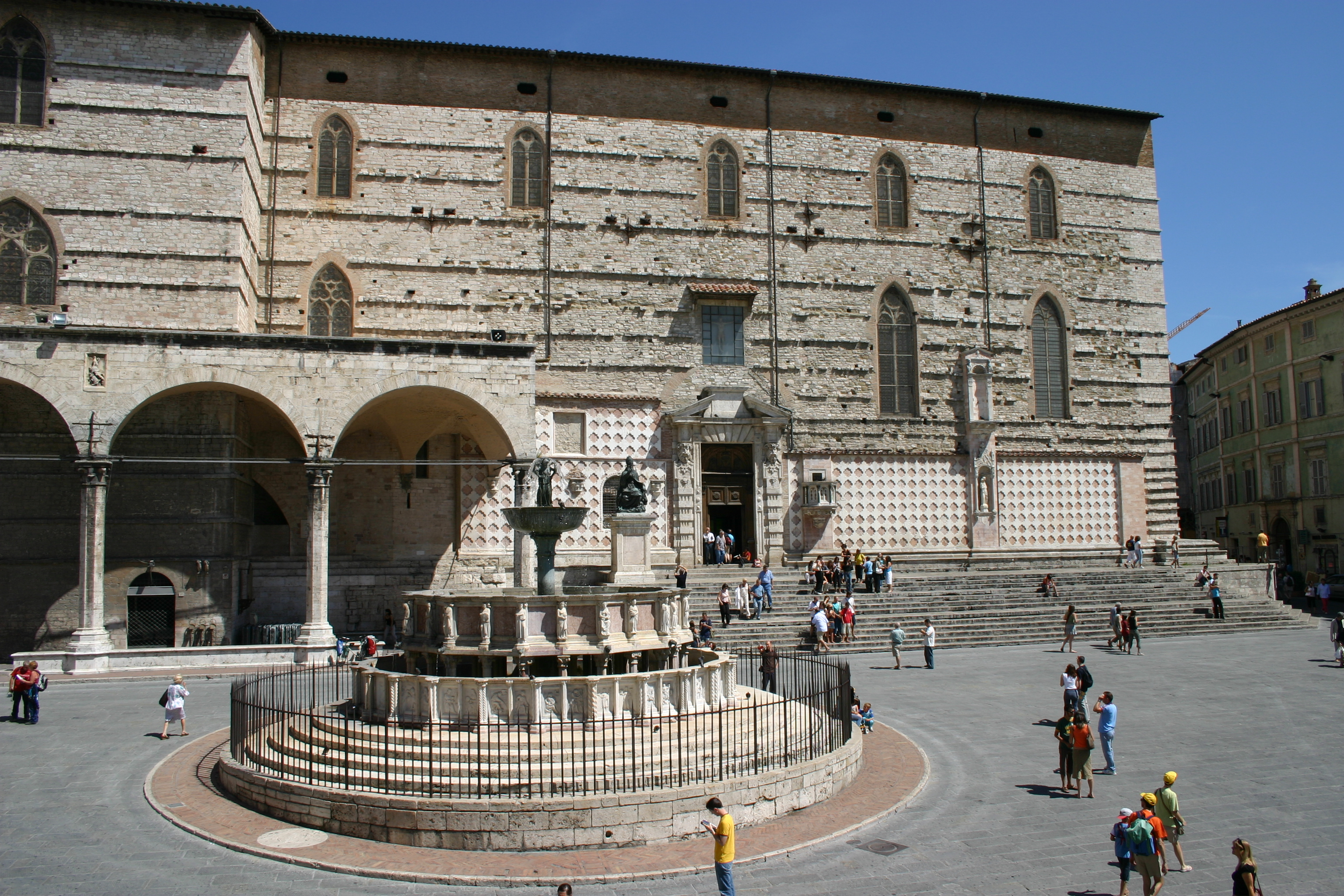
The Cathedral of S. Lorenzo in Perugia, the city where the conclave was held

The Sacred College of Cardinals was divided into two factions: pro-French and anti-French ("Bonifacians"). The smaller, pro-French party counted six cardinals under the leadership of cardinals Napoleone Orsini Frangipani and Niccolò Alberti. They looked for the reconciliation with France and Colonna. The larger party, anti-French, led by Cardinal Matteo Orsini Rosso and Francesco Caetani, cardinal-nephew of Boniface VIII, demanded atonement for the outrage committed on the person of Boniface VIII by French Chancellor Nogaret at Anagni, and rejected any concessions towards Philip IV of France. It counted 10 electors. At the beginning of the conclave the cardinals arbitrarily decided to annul the most restrictive rules of the Constitution Ubi periculum about the conclave, which made it possible to prolong the proceedings. During the first months of the conclave both parties voted mainly for their leaders: Matteo Orsini and Napoleone Orsini. However, the 74-year-old Matteo Orsini later fell ill, preventing him from taking an active part in the conclave. Lack of effective leadership eventually led to division in the anti-French party. Some of its members, looking for a compromise, proposed archbishop Bertrand de Got of Bordeaux. Napoleone Orsini initially was sceptical about this candidature but finally he had accepted it. His opinion was decisive for the result, because an alliance of pro-French party with the "Bonifacian dissidents" gave exactly the required majority of two thirds. On 5 June 1305, after 11 months of deliberations, Bertrand de Got was elected to the Papacy.

At the time of his election de Got was Archbishop of Bordeaux, and thus a subject of Edward I, King of England (who had recently conquered Normandy), although he was a childhood friend of Philip IV of France ("the Fair").

== Sources ==
One eyewitness to the conclave was Florentine historian Giovanni Villani (Hist. Florent., VIII, 80, in Muratori, Rerum Italicarum Scriptores, XIII, 417; cf. Raynaldus, Caesaris Baronii Annales Ecclesiastici, 1305, 2-4).

== Aftermath ==
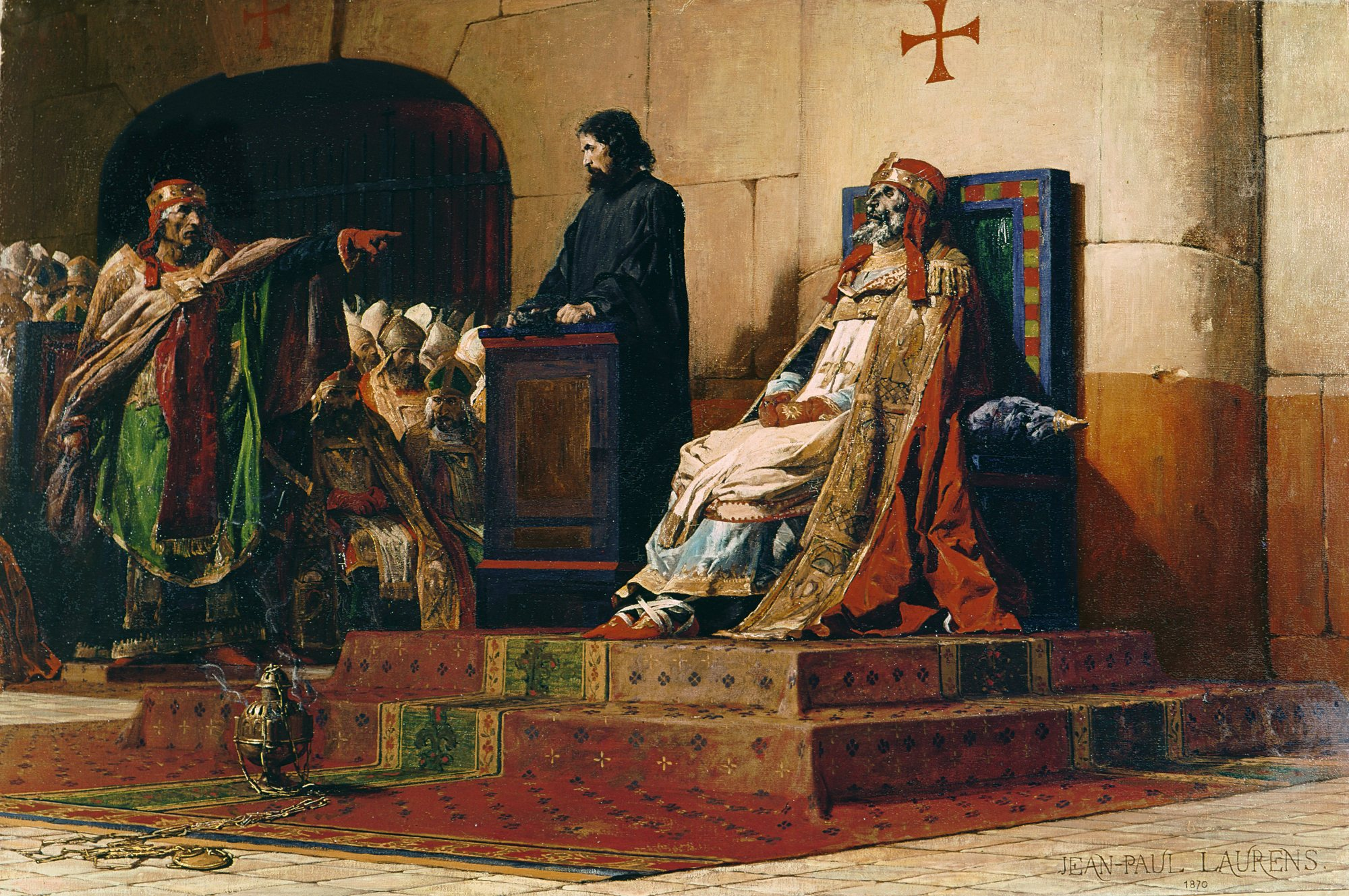
Philip IV wished to see a process similar to the Cadaver Synod initiated against the late Pope Boniface VIII; instead, Clement V made a wide array of concessions to Philip IV.

The cardinals besought de Got upon his election to join them in Perugia and thereafter to travel to Rome for his papal coronation; however, he ordered them to travel to Lyon for his coronation on 4 November 1305, at which Philip IV of France ("the Fair") was present. During the ensuing public procession a collapsing wall knocked Clement V from his horse (resulting in the loss of a carbuncle from the Papal Tiara) and killed both the brother of Clement V and the aged Matteo Orsini Rosso (a participant in twelve conclaves). The next day, another brother of Clement V was killed in a dispute between his servants and the retainers of the College of Cardinals.

Philip IV immediately demanded of Clement V that the memory of Pope Boniface VIII be condemned, that his name be stricken from the list of popes, that his bones be disinterred and burned, that his ashes be scattered to the wind, and that he be declared a heretic, blasphemer, and immoral priest. Clement V delayed such an action without explicitly refusing it and in the meantime made several important concessions to Philip IV: he extended the absolution granted by Benedict XI, created nine French cardinals (a mix of crown-cardinals and cardinal-nephews), restored the cardinalates of Giacomo and Pietro Colonna (which had been deprived by Boniface VIII), gave Philip IV a five-year title to a variety of church property, withdrew the papal bull Clericis laicos (1296) and limited the bull Unam sanctam (1302, both of Boniface VIII), granted some church revenues to Charles of Valois, pretender to the Byzantine throne, and made concessions weakening the Knights Templar. However, Philip IV wanted to a see a process similar to the Cadaver Synod initiated against Boniface VIII, which Clement V seemingly yielded to, setting a date of 2 February 1309; however, as this process proved to be dilatory and likely favorable to the deceased pontiff, Philip IV moved to cancel it in February 1311; by the time the Council of Vienne (which ultimately sided with Boniface VIII) had been called, Philip IV demanded only that he be absolved of responsibility for the various processes against Boniface VIII, which he was.

Between 1305 and 1309, Clement V moved from Bordeaux to Poitiers to Toulouse before taking up residence as a guest in the Dominican monastery of Avignon (at the time, a fief of Naples, and part of the Comtat Venaissin, a territory directly subject to the Holy See since 1228). Clement V's decision to relocate the papacy to France was one of the most contested issues in the papal conclave, 1314–1316 following his death, during which the minority of Italian cardinals were unable to engineer the return of the papacy to Rome. Avignon remained a territory of Naples until Pope Clement VI purchased it from Joan I of Naples for 80,000 gold gulden in 1348.

== Bibliography ==
- G. Mollat. 1963. The Popes at Avignon 1305-1378. London.
- (in Polish) K. Dopierała. 1996. Księga papieży. Pallotinum, Poznań.
- (in Polish) A. Piazzoni. 2003. Historia wyboru papieży. Wyd. M, Kraków
