= Robert de Pontigny =

French monk, abbot and Roman Catholic Cardinal

Cardinal Robert de Pontigny
- Cardinal-Priest
- Church: Abbey of Cîteaux
- Elected: January 1294
- Predecessor: Thibaut de Saucy (1284-1294)
- Successor: Rufin de la Ferté (9 October 1294-30 November 1299)

Orders
- Created cardinal: 18 September 1294 by Pope Celestine V

Personal details
- Died: 9 October 1305 Parma
- Buried: Parma, then Citeaux
- Occupation: Cistercian monk and abbot
- Education: Master of Theology

Robert de Pontigny, O.Cist. (born in France, date unknown; died at Parma, 9 October 1305) was a French monk, abbot and Roman Catholic Cardinal.

== Early career ==
Nothing at all is known of his birthplace, his family, or his upbringing. It is occasionally said that he was a Master of Theology, though this statement lacks documentary support. He obviously became a Cistercian monk, though the house that admitted him is unknown (unless it were Pontigny), and nothing is attested as to his formation or early career.

== Abbot ==
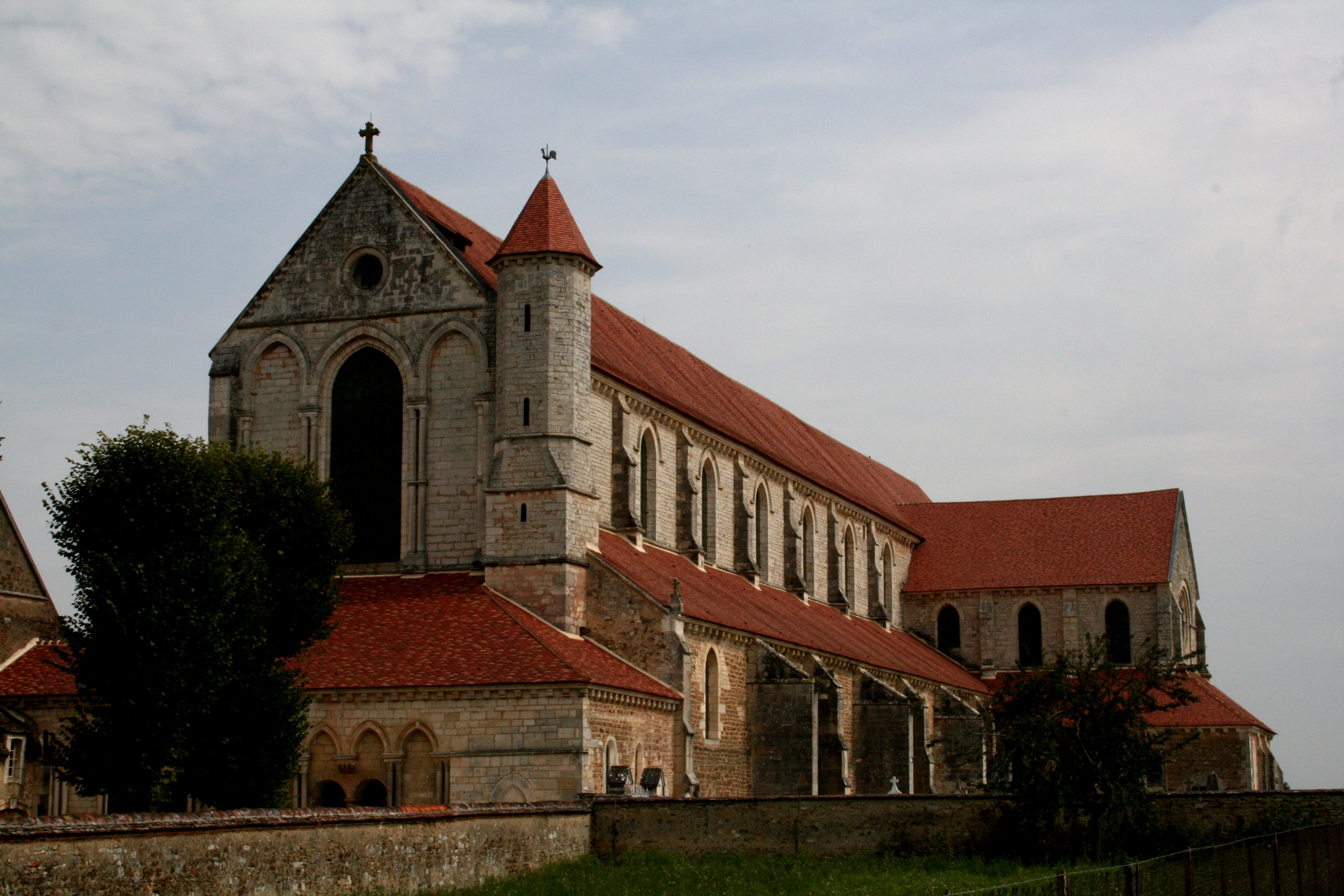
Abbey of Pontigny

Robert is attested as Abbot of Pontigny on 1 March 1289, In 1291 he and the abbey became involved in a lawsuit with Margaret, Queen of Naples and widow of Charles I of Naples, who was also Comtesse de Tonnerre. A strong supporter of the feudal idea, Queen Margaret challenged the monks over the rights of justice with regard to Pontigny, Saint-Porcaire, Beugnon, Beauvais, and Aigremont. The case reached King Philip IV, who had the parties choose arbitrators, Robert Duke of Burgundy and Thibault Abbot of Cîteaux. It was decided that all civil jurisdiction belonged to the Abbey, while criminal jurisdiction was to belong to the Countess and her successors.

Robert of Pontigny was himself Abbot of Cîteaux, from January, 1294 to September, 1294, when he was named cardinal.

It is sometimes said that he was a friend of King Philip IV of France and of King Charles II of Naples, but these are inferences, not documented facts. That he owed his promotion to these monarchs is likewise unattested.

== Cardinal ==
Robert de Pontigny was created cardinal by Pope Celestine V in a Consistory held at L'Aquila on 18 September 1294. He was then assigned the title of Santa Pudenziana. His earliest surviving subscription as Cardinal-Priest of S. Pudenziana occurs on 21 June 1295 under Pope Boniface VIII.

He was one of the twenty-two cardinals who participated in the Conclave of 23–24 December 1294 in Naples, following the resignation of Pope Celestine V. Cardinal Benedetto Caetani was elected on the first scrutiny and chose the throne name Boniface VIII.

Cardinal Robert de Pontigny was Chamberlain (Treasurer) of the College of Cardinals from 3 January 1298 to 9 October 1305.

Under Pope Boniface he was appointed Auditor (judge) in the case between the Bishop of Amiens and the Dean and Canons of the cathedral; the case dragged on, without resolution, through the reign of Benedict XI. Pope Boniface died in the Vatican Palace on October 11, 1303, thirty-five days after the assault against him at Anagni, led by the French chancellor Guillaume de Nogaret and the two Colonna ex-cardinals.

Cardinal Robert de Pontigny participated in the Conclave which took place in the Vatican Palace. Cardinal Niccolò Boccasini was elected pope on the first ballot on 22 October 1303. He chose the throne name Benedict XI.

In 1303, Cardinal Robert was a member of a committee of cardinals for the examination of the election and character of Abbot Cambio of the Monastery of S. Salvatore in Rieti. The election was approved by Pope Benedict XI on 4 December 1303. He performed the same function in the case of the election of Fr. Ventura Pauli, OSB, to be abbot of S. Maria de Alfiolo in Gubbio, and that of Archmandrite Jacobus, O.Bas., of the monastery of S. Elias at Anglona. After a contentious election of an abbot in the Augustinian monastery of Beaulieu in the diocese of Saint Malo, and after an appeal by one of the monks, Petrus de Porta, through every level of the ecclesiastical courts, the case was assigned to Cardinal Robert, who recommended that the seat be declared vacant; Pope Benedict granted Cardinal Robert the favor of naming whomever he thought suitable to the post. He was a member of a commission of three cardinals who investigated the situation of Bishop Raymond of Vaison, who had been suspended both from ecclesiastical and temporal functions in the reign of Boniface VIII; the committee approved his reinstatement. He was also a member of a committee that examined the election of Abbot Michael of the monastery of S. Isidore in Leon. On 7 July 1304, Pope Benedict XI died in Perugia.

== Conclave of 1304–1305 ==
Cardinal Robert de Pontigny participated in the Conclave to elect Pope Benedict's successor. Fifteen cardinals participated in the Conclave, but only ten were in the Conclave for the final vote. The two Colonna cardinals, who had been deposed by Boniface VIII in 1297, were not in attendance. The Conclave began on 17 July 1304. There was, however, no easy decision. The French faction was led by Cardinal Napoleone Orsini, and included Giovanni Boccamazza (Tusculum), Giovanni Minio (Porto), Niccolò Alberti da Prato (Ostia), Landolfo Brancaccio (S. Angelo in Pescheria), Guglielmo Longhi (S. Nicola in Carcere Tulliano), Jean Le Moine (SS. Marcellino e Pietro), Robert de Pontigny (S. Pudenziana), Riccardo Petroni (S. Eustachio), and ultimately Walter Winterburn (S. Sabina). His opponent was another Orsini, Cardinal Matteo Rosso Orsini, whose group is known to have included his nephews Francesco Orsini, (S. Lucia) and Giacomo Gaetani Stefaneschi (S. Giorgio in Velabro), Teodorico Ranieri (Palestrina), Leonardo Patrassi (Albano), Pedro Rodriguez (Sabina), Francesco Caetani (S. Maria in Cosmedin), Gentile Partino (S. Martino ai Monti), and Luca Fieschi, (S. Maria in Via Lata). Archbishop Bertrand de Got, the younger brother of the late Cardinal Bérard de Got, Archbishop of Bordeaux since 1299, and a subject of the King of England, had been nominated by the faction of Cardinal Matteo Rosso Orsini as long as six months before his final election (approximately the first half of December, 1304). Finally, on 5 July 1305, after some dirty tricks, a two-thirds vote in favor of the Archbishop of Bordeaux was achieved. He became Clement V, and was crowned in Lyons on 14 November 1305. He never visited Rome. The Papacy had moved to France.

Cardinal Robert de Pontigny did not return to France to do homage to the new pope or to see him crowned. He died at Parma on 9 October 1305. He was buried in the Cistercian Church of S. Martin outside Parma (the famous Charterhouse of Parma), but his remains were transferred to Cîteaux.

== Bibliography ==
- Jean Roy, Nouvelle histoire des cardinaux françois, ornée de leurs portraits Tome cinquième (Paris: Chez Poinçot 1788).
- V. B. Henry, Histoire de l'abbaye de Pontigny (Avallon 1882).
- Paul Maria Baumgarten, "Die Cardinalsernennungen Cälastins V. im September und Oktober 1294," (Stephan Ehses, editor) Festschrift zum elfhundertjährigen Jubiläum des deutschen Campo Santo in Rom (Freiburg im Breisgau: Herder 1897) 161–169.
- Paul Maria Baumgarten, Untersuchungen und Urkunden über die Camera Collegii Cardinalium für die Zeit von 1295 bis 1437 (Leipzig 1898).
- Ch. Grandjean, Les registres de Benoît XI (Paris 1883).
- Georges Digard, Les registres de Boniface VIII Tome I (Paris 1890).
- Ernest Langlois, Les registres de Nicolas IV (Paris 1905).
- Ferdinand Gregorovius, History of the City of Rome in the Middle Ages, Volume V, second edition, revised (London: George Bell, 1906).
- Martine Garrigues, Le Premier cartulaire de l'Abbaye cistercienne de Pontigny: XIIe-XIIIe siècles (Paris: Bibliothèque Nationale, 1981).
