= Unam sanctam =

1302 papal bull issued by Boniface VIII

Unam sanctam Latin for 'One and Holy' Papal bull of Pope Boniface VIII
- Signature date: 18 November 1302
- Subject: Relations between the Catholic Church and the state
- Text: In English

Unam sanctam (Note: The bull is known by its incipit: Unam sanctam ecclesiam catholicam et ipsam apostolicam urgente fide credere cogimur et tenere, nosque hanc firmiter credimus et simpliciter confitemur, [...].) is a papal bull that was issued by Pope Boniface VIII on 18 November 1302. It laid down dogmatic propositions on the unity of the Catholic Church, the necessity of belonging to it for eternal salvation, the position of the Pope as supreme head of the Church and the duty thence arising of submission to the Pope in order to belong to the Church and thus to attain salvation. The Pope further emphasized the higher position of the spiritual in comparison with the secular order. The historian Brian Tierney calls it "probably the most famous" document on church and state in medieval Europe. The original document is lost, but a version of the text can be found in the registers of Boniface VIII in the Vatican Archives. The bull was the definitive statement of the late medieval theory of hierocracy, which argued for the temporal as well as spiritual supremacy of the pope.

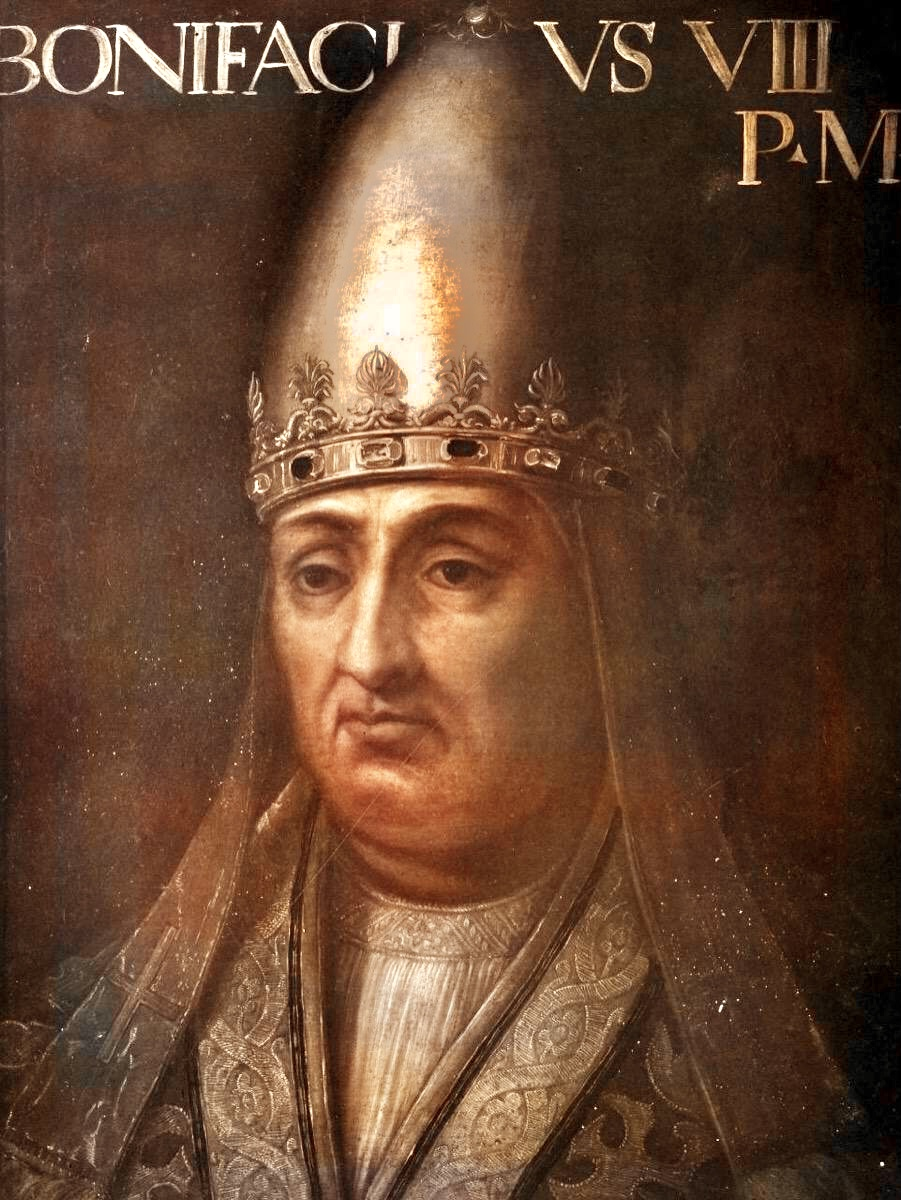
Boniface VIII, Bishop of Rome

== Background ==
The bull was promulgated during an ongoing dispute between Boniface VIII and King Philip IV of France (Philip the Fair). Philip had levied taxes on the French clergy of half their annual income. On 5 February 1296, Boniface responded with the papal bull Clericis laicos that forbade clerics, without authority from the Holy See, to pay taxes to temporal rulers, and threatened excommunication on rulers who demanded such payments.

King Edward I of England defended his own taxing powers by putting defiant clergy under outlawry, a Roman law concept withdrawing their protection under the English common law, and confiscated the temporal properties of bishops who refused his levies. As Edward was demanding an amount well above the tenth offered by the clergy, Archbishop of Canterbury Robert Winchelsey left it to every individual clergyman to pay as he saw fit.

In August 1296 King Philip imposed an embargo forbidding export of horses, arms, gold, and silver, effectively keeping the French clergy from sending taxes to Rome and blocking a main source of papal revenue. Philip also banished from France papal agents raising funds for a new crusade.

In September 1296 the pope sent a protest to Philip headed Ineffabilis Amor that declared that he would rather suffer death than surrender any of the rightful prerogatives of the Church. While threatening a papal alliance with England and Germany, the pope soothingly explained that his claims were not intended against the customary feudal dues, and that reasonable taxation of Church revenue would be permitted. To assist their king against the Anglo-Flemish alliance, the French bishops asked permission to make contributions for the defense of the kingdom. In February 1297, Boniface issued Romana mater ecclesia, declaring that when the clergy consented to make payments and delay could cause grave danger, papal permission could be dispensed, and ratified the French payments in the encyclical Corum illo fatemur. While insisting that Church consent was required for subsidies to the state, he recognised that the clergy in each country must evaluate such claims. In July 1297, Boniface, further beset by an uprising in Rome by the Colonna family, again moderated his assertions in Clericis laicos. The bull Etsi de statu allowed lay authorities to declare emergencies to tax clerical property.

The Jubilee year of 1300 filled Rome with fervent masses of pilgrims who supplied the lack of French gold in the treasury. The following year, Philip's ministers overstepped their bounds. In the Albigensian Crusade, the suppression of the Cathar heresy had brought much of Languedoc under French royal control, but in the farthest south, heretics still survived, and Bernard Saisset, Bishop of Pamiers in Foix, was recalcitrant and insolent with king. Philip's ministry decided to make an example of the bishop, who was brought before the royal court on 24 October 1301. The chancellor, Pierre Flotte, charged him with high treason, and put the bishop in the keeping of his metropolitan, the archbishop of Narbonne. Before Saisset could be tried, the royal ministry needed the Pope to strip the bishop of his office and protections, a "canonical degradation". Instead, in December 1301 Boniface ordered the bishop to Rome to justify himself before his pope rather than his king. In the bull Ausculta Fili ("Give ear, my son"), he scolded Phillip: "Let no one persuade you that you have no superior or that you are not subject to the head of the ecclesiastical hierarchy, for he is a fool who so thinks." At the same time, Boniface sent out the general bull Salvator mundi strongly reiterating Clericis laicos.

With his customary tactlessness, Boniface then summoned the French bishops to Rome to reform their national Church matters. Philip forbade Saisset or any bishop to attend, and organized a counterassembly of his own in Paris in April 1302. Nobles, burgesses and clergy met to denounce the Pope and pass around a crude forgery, Deum Time ("Fear God"), in which Boniface supposedly claimed feudal suzerainty over France, an "unheard-of assertion". Boniface denied the document and its claims, but reminded Phillip that previous popes had deposed three French kings.

This was the atmosphere in which Unam sanctam was promulgated weeks later. Reading of the "two swords" (the spiritual and temporal powers), one of Philip's ministers is alleged to have remarked, "My master's sword is steel; the Pope's is made of words". As Matthew Edward Harris writes, "The overall impression gained is that the papacy was described in increasingly exalted terms as the thirteenth century progressed, although this development was neither disjunctive nor uniform, and was often in response to conflict, such as against Frederick II and Philip the Fair".

== Content ==
Most significantly, the bull proclaimed the doctrine extra ecclesiam nulla salus ("outside of the Church, there is no salvation)". The phrase is first found in Cyprian of Carthage (d. 258) discussing the validity of baptisms by heretical clergy. Gregory of Nazianzus also held that view but, with his father as an example, recognized men whose devout conduct anticipates their faith: by the charity of their life they were united to Christ, even before explicitly professing Christianity. Subsequent commentators such as Augustine of Hippo, Jerome, and Bede cited the doctrine in an ecclesiastical context.

Boniface interpreted it as a form of the concept of plenitudo potestatis (plenitude of power), that those who resist the Roman Pontiff resist God's ordination. In the 13th century, the canonists used the term plenitudo potestatis to characterize the power of the Pope within the church or, more rarely, his prerogative in the secular sphere. The bull declares that the Church must be united and the Pope was its sole and absolute head: "Therefore, of the one and only Church there is one body and one head, not two heads like a monster".

The bull also stated, "We are informed by the texts of the gospels that in this Church and in its power are two swords; namely, the spiritual and the temporal." The metaphor refers to the swords yielded by the Apostles upon Christ's arrest (Luke 22:38; Matthew 26:52). Early theologians believed that if there are two swords, one must be subordinate to the other, rungs in a spiritual hierarchical ladder: the spiritual judges the secular "on account of its greatness and sublimity", and the higher spiritual power judges the lower spiritual power etc. Thus, the bull concluded, the temporal authorities must submit to the spiritual authorities, not merely on matters concerning doctrine and morality: "For with truth as our witness, it belongs to spiritual power to establish the terrestrial power and to pass judgment if it has not been good". The bull ended, "Furthermore, we declare, we proclaim, we define that it is absolutely necessary for salvation that every human creature be subject to the Roman Pontiff".

The bull reiterated the declarations of popes since Gregory VII, as well as the writings of Bernard of Clairvaux, Hugh of Saint Victor and Thomas Aquinas. The bull also contained passages from the letters of Pope Innocent III, who mainly reasserted the spiritual power and the "plenitudo potestatis" of the papacy. A voice heavily noticed in the bull is Giles of Rome, who some hold might have been its actual writer. Giles, in On Ecclesiastical Power, voiced the supremacy of the Roman Pontiff over the material world. He argued that since the body is governed by the soul, and the soul is governed by the spiritual ruler, the Roman Pontiff is the governor of both soul and body.

According to the Catholic Encyclopedia, on the margin of the text of the record, the last sentence is noted as its real definition: Declaratio quod subesse Romano Pontifici est omni humanae creaturae de necessitate salutis ("A declaration that it is necessary for salvation that every human creature be subject to the Roman Pontiff"); thus this phrase, like some in canonical scripture, may have moved from an original position as a marginal gloss to an integral part of the text as it has been accepted. Some believe that this is the only intended dogmatic definition in the bull because the rest is based on differing "papal claims of the thirteenth century". Eamon Duffy finds most of the claims in the encyclical to be similar to those made by every pope since Gregory VII. However, what made his claim "notorious" was that Boniface "insisted that the Pope wielded both the spiritual and secular sword, [...] the culminating blow in a propaganda war against the French crown."

== Aftermath ==
Boniface's reputation for overweening papal claims made it difficult to accept such an extreme declaration. His assertion over the temporal was seen as hollow and misguided, and it is said that the document was not seen as authoritative because the body of the faithful did not accept it.

Philip had the Dominican John of Paris issue a refutation. Boniface reacted by excommunicating Philip, who then called an assembly which made 29 accusations against the pope, including infidelity, heresy, simony, gross and unnatural immorality, idolatry, magic, loss of the Holy Land and the death of Pope Celestine V. Five archbishops and 21 bishops sided with the king.

Boniface could respond only by denouncing the charges, but it was already too late for him. On 7 September 1303, the king's advisor, Guillaume de Nogaret, led a band of 2000 mercenaries on horse and foot who joined locals in an attack on the palaces of the Pope and his nephew at the papal residence at Anagni, which was later referred to as the Outrage of Anagni. The Pope's attendants and his beloved nephew Francesco all soon fled; only the Spaniard Pedro Rodríguez, Cardinal of Santa Sabina, remained at his side to the end.

The palace was plundered, and Boniface escaped murder only upon Nogaret's explicit order. Boniface was subjected to harassment and held prisoner for three days without food or drink. Eventually, the townsfolk expelled the marauders. According to a late and unverified tradition, the locals were rallied and led by Cardinal Luca Fieschi. Boniface pardoned those who were captured and was escorted back to Rome on 13 September 1303.

Boniface was shaken by the incident. He developed a violent fever and died on 11 October 1303. In A Distant Mirror: The Calamitous Fourteenth Century, Barbara W. Tuchman stated that his close advisors would later maintain that he had died of a "profound chagrin".

Boniface's successor, Pope Benedict XI, reigned for only nine months. He removed himself and the Roman Curia from the violence of Rome as soon as the Easter celebrations of 1304 were completed. However, on 7 June 1304, from Perugia, he excommunicated Guillaume de Nogaret, Reynald de Supino, his son Robert, Thomas de Morolo, Peter of Gennazano, his son Stephen, Adenulph and Nicolas, the sons of a certain Matteo, Geoffrey Bussy, Orlando and Pietro de Luparia of Anagni, Sciarra Colonna, John the son of Landolph, Gottifredus the son of John de Ceccano, Maximus de Trebes, and other leaders of the factions who had attacked Boniface. He died on 7 July 1304. The conclave to pick his successor was in deadlock for eleven months before deciding, under the intimidation of King Charles II of Naples, on Archbishop Bertrand de Got of Bordeaux, who took the name Pope Clement V. To please Philip IV of France, Clement moved his residence to Avignon. From then until around 1378, the Church fell under the domination of the French monarchy. Philip was said to have held a vendetta against the Holy See until his death.

It was not only the French monarchy and clergy who disapproved of Boniface and his assertions. Writers throughout Europe attacked the bull and Boniface's bold claims for the power of the papacy over the temporal, most notably the Florentine poet Dante Alighieri, who expressed his need for another strong Holy Roman Emperor. Dante's treatise Monarchia attempted to refute the Pope's claim that the spiritual sword had power over the temporal sword. Dante pointed out that the Pope and Roman Emperor were both equally human, and thus peers. The two "equal swords" were given power by God to rule over their respective domains.
