= Cardinal Orsini =

Cardinal Orsini may refer to:

- Alessandro Orsini (cardinal) (1592–1626), cardinal 1615–26
- Domenico Orsini d'Aragona (1719–89), cardinal 1743–89
- Flavio Orsini (1532–81), cardinal 1565–81
- Francesco Napoleone Orsini (died 1312), cardinal 1295–1312; a cardinal elector at the 1304–1305 papal conclave
- Franciotto Orsini (1473–1534), cardinal 1517–34
- Giacomo Orsini (cardinal) (died 1379), cardinal 1371–79
- Giordano Orsini (died 1287), cardinal 1278–87
- Giordano Orsini (died 1438), cardinal 1405–38
- Jordan of Santa Susanna (Giordano Bobone Orsini, died after 1154), cardinal from 1144
- Giambattista Orsini (died 1503), cardinal 1483–1503
- Giovanni Orsini (died 1280), cardinal from 1243 and Pope Nicholas III from 1277
- Giovanni Gaetano Orsini (died 1335), cardinal 1316–35
- Latino Orsini (1411–77), cardinal 1448–77
- Latino Malabranca Orsini (died 1294), cardinal 1278–94
- Matteo Orsini (died 1340), cardinal 1327–40
- Napoleone Orsini (cardinal) (1263–1342), cardinal 1288–1342
- Rinaldo Orsini (cardinal) (died 1374), cardinal 1350–74; a participant in the 1352 papal conclave
- Tommaso Orsini (died 1390), cardinal ca. 1383–90
- Vincenzo Maria Orsini (1650–1730), cardinal from 1672 and Pope Benedict XIII from 1724
- Virginio Orsini (cardinal) (1615–76), cardinal 1641–76
