= Landolfo Brancaccio =

Neapolitan aristocrat and cardinal

Cardinal Landolfo Brancaccio
- Cardinal-Deacon
- Church: Sant'Angelo in Pescheria

Orders
- Created cardinal: 18 September 1294 by Pope Celestine V

Personal details
- Died: 29 October 1312 Avignon, France

Landolfo Brancaccio (? in the Kingdom of Naples – 29 October 1312 in Avignon) was a Neapolitan aristocrat, friend of King Charles II of Naples, and Roman Catholic Cardinal.

== Latter career ==
Brancaccio first emerges in a record of his creation as Cardinal-Deacon by Pope Celestine V in the Consistory of 18 September 1294, and assignment to the Deaconry of Sant'Angelo in Pescheria in Rome.

He attended the Conclave of 23–24 December 1294, which followed the resignation of Pope Celestine V. Benedetto Caetani was elected Pope Boniface VIII at the accession after the first ballot.

Cardinal Landolfo was appointed Legate in the Kingdom of Sicily (i.e. the Kingdom of Charles II of Naples) by Boniface VIII on 6 April 1294, and Administrator of the Kingdom of Naples along with Filippo Prince of Taranto, Vicar of the Kingdom of Naples. On 28 January 1298 Pope Boniface ordered his Apostolic Legate, Cardinal Landolfo, Cardinal Deacon of Sant'Angelo, to carry out the gift of the monastery S. Trinità in Venosa to the Knights Hospitallers.

He was again Legate in Sicily (7 August 1299), but he had been recalled by 13 September. He was present, however, at Agropoli near Salerno when Queen Blanche of Aragon gave birth to a son and heir, Alfonso; the Cardinal wrote immediately to King James II on 8 September 1299. He was back in the Curia and subscribing documents on 2 October 1300. He was already one of the agents handling Curia business for King James II of Aragon, King of Sicily, a connection he maintained for the rest of his career. In September 1301 Pope Boniface made Cardinal Brancaccio Auditor (Judge) in the matter of the election of a Bishop for his newly acquired territory of Murcia.

When Bishop Hector of the diocese of Castro died, and two candidates were separately elected his successor, the case was referred to the Pope. Boniface VIII appointed Cardinal Landolfo as Assessor (Judge), and upon examination Landolfo recommended the voiding of both elections. But death intervened, and Boniface was not able to settle the case. It was his successor, Benedict XI, who provided a new bishop for Castro on 8 November 1303.

Cardinal Brancaccio attended the Conclave of 1303, following the death of Pope Boniface at the Vatican on 11 October 1303. Cardinal Niccolò Boccasini, the former Master General of the Dominicans, was elected on 22 October 1303, and chose the name Benedict XI. At the request of Cardinal Landolfo, his nephew Berardus Sui Sari was granted a canonry and benefice in the Cathedral of Naples on 3 November 1303.

At the end of 1303, Cardinal Landolfo sat on a committee with Cardinal Giovanni Boccamazza and Cardinal Robert de Pontigny to ascertain the facts in the election of an abbot for S. Maria de Alfiolo in Gubbio. Pope Benedict ratified their decision, quashing the objections of an interested party, on 2 January 1304. Sitting on another committee at the same time, the committee quashed the election of an Archmandrite for the Abbey of S. Elias de Carbone in the diocese of Anglone and the Pope appointed his own choice. Cardinal Landolfo, along with fourteen other cardinals, signed the papal Bull in favor of the Monastery of Santo Spirito in Sulmone. At the end of the reign of Boniface VIII, the Cardinal was entrusted with handling the case of the excommunication of Otto and Conrad of Brandenburg and their followers, who had despoiled various churches and other property, and his recommendations were finally approved by Benedict XI on 12 March 1304. On 17 February 1304 Cardinal Landolfo was granted the privilege by Benedict XI of naming the next Bishop of Viesti (Vestana).

Cardinal Landolfo was one of the nineteen cardinals who attended the Conclave of 1304-1305 at Perugia, where Benedict XI had died on 7 July 1304. It began on 17 July, with Cardinal Landolfo placing himself in the faction led by Cardinal Napoleone Orsini. The cardinals reached a decision on 5 July 1305 with the election of the Archbishop of Bordeaux, Bertrand de Got, who was not a cardinal. He called himself Pope Clement V. He was French, but a subject of King Edward I of England, not of King Philip IV of France.

On 10 July 1308 Cardinal Landolfo was one of four cardinals who met in the house of Cardinal Guillaume de Mandagot in Poitou, and there witnessed the abjuration of heresy by more than fifty members of the Knights Templar. Brancaccio was one of the three cardinals sent by Clement V to the Chateau de Chinon in July, 1308, to interrogate Jacques de Molay and the other Templars who were being held prisoner there. De Molay later recanted, in the presence of Pope Clement, the confession he had given the cardinals. On 24 June 1310 Cardinal Landolfo and Cardinal Stephanus de Suisy were sent by Pope Clement to negotiate with King Philip IV pro quibusdam urgentibus negotiis ('concerning certain pressing matters').

On 27 October 1310, the Cardinal was able to procure an extension for one of his chaplains, a subdeacon, of an additional year on the requirement of Pope Gregory X that a new appointee to a benefice had one year to be ordained a priest. On 27 November 1310 Cardinal Landolfo was given faculties to receive the resignation of Raymond de Gabriaco, the Rector of the church of S. Maria de Osorio in the diocese of Maguelonne, and appointing in his place Bernard de Gabriaco.

He attended the Ecumenical Council of Vienne under Pope Clement V in 1311 and 1312. It was at this Council that the dissolution of the Knights Templar was decreed.

== Death ==
He died in Avignon of 29 October 1312, and was buried in the Cathedral of Notre Dame des Domps, in the Chapel of the Angels which he had had constructed.

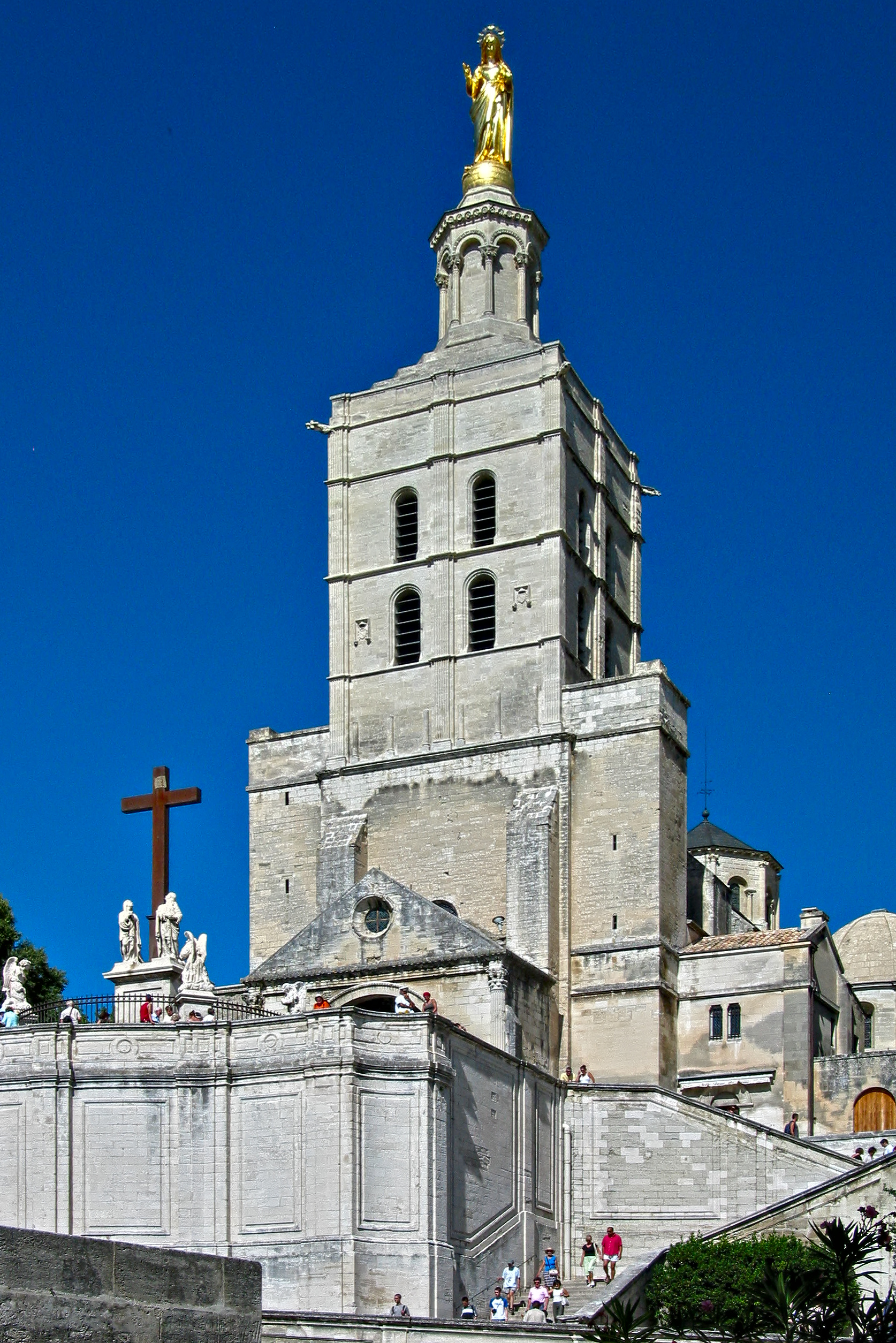
Cathedral of Avignon

== Bibliography ==
- Martin Souchon, Die Papstwahlen von Bonifaz VIII bis Urban VI (Braunschweig: Benno Goeritz 1888), pp. 15–23.
- Paul Maria Baumgarten, "Die Cardinalsernennungen Cälastins V. im September und Oktober 1294," (Stephan Ehses, editor) Festschrift zum elfhundertjährigen Jubiläum des deutschen Campo Santo in Rom (Freiburg im Breisgau: Herder 1897) 161-169.
- Georges Digard, Les registres de Boniface VIII Tome I (Paris 1890).
- Heinrich Finke, Aus den Tage Bonifaz VIII. Funde und Forschungen (Münster 1902) 279-290
- Ferdinand Gregorovius, History of the City of Rome in the Middle Ages, Volume V, second edition, revised (London: George Bell, 1906).
- Heinrich Finke, Acta Aragonensia. Quellen zur deutschen, italianischen, franzosischen, spanischen, zur Kirchen- und Kulturgeschichte aus der diplomatischen Korrespondenz Jaymes II. (1291-1327) (Berlin und Leipzig 1908)
- Ingeborg Walter, "Brancaccio, Landolfo," Dizionario Biografico degli Italiani 13 (1971). [in Italian]
- A. Trinci, "Il collegio cardinalizio di Celestino V," Celestino V e i suoi tempi: realta spirituale e realta politica. Atti del 4° Convegno storico internazionale L'Aquila, 26-27 agosto 1989 (ed. W. Capezzali) (L'Aquila 1990), pp. 19–34.
- Vito Sibilio, Benedetto XI: Il papa tra Roma e Avignone (Roma: Istituto storico domenicano, 2004).
