= Cardinals created by Benedict XI =

Catholic appointments from 1303 to 1304

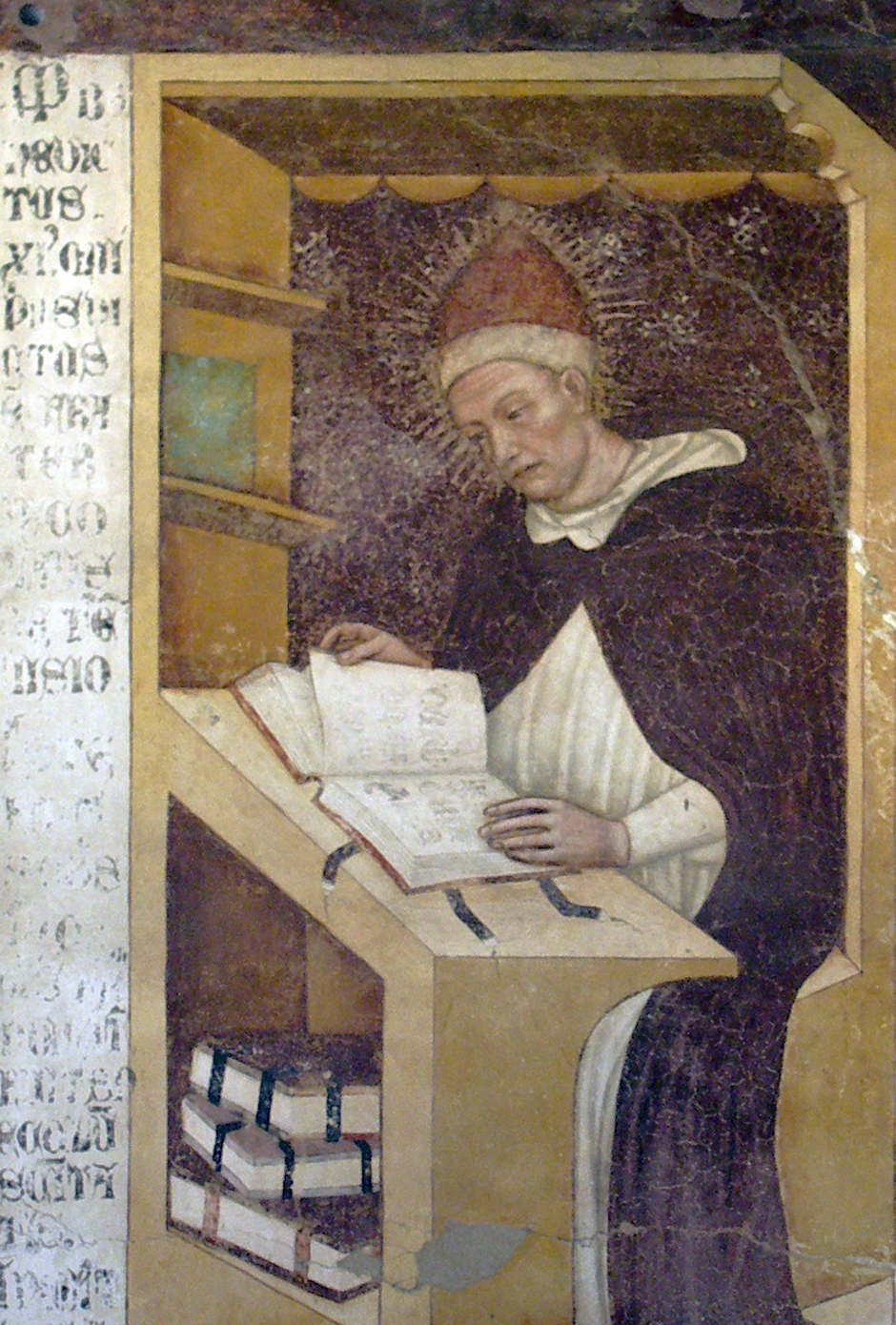
Pope Benedict XI (r. 1303–1304)

Pope Benedict XI (r. 1303–1304) created 2 cardinals in 2 consistories held during his pontificate. Both cardinals he appointed were Dominicans like the pope himself.

== 18 December 1303 ==
Benedict XI also intended to name the English Dominican priest William of Macclesfield as the Cardinal-Priest of Santa Sabina on this date but the cardinal-elect died before news of his elevation could reach him.

- Niccolò Alberti O.P. (Cardinal-Bishop of Ostia e Velletri)

== 19 February 1304 ==
- Walter Winterburn O.P. (Cardinal-Priest of Santa Sabina)

== Sources ==
- Miranda, Salvador. "Consistories for the creation of Cardinals 14th Century (1303-1404): Benedict XI". The Cardinals of the Holy Roman Church. Florida International University. OCLC 53276621.
