= Cardinals created by Honorius IV =

Catholic appointments in 1285

Pope Honorius IV (1285–1287) only created one new cardinal during his papacy. This was accomplished on 22 December 1285:

- Giovanni Boccamazza, archbishop of Monreale and nephew of Pope Honorius – cardinal-bishop of Frascati, † 10 August 1309
