= Pedro Rodríguez (cardinal) =

Castilian ecclesiastic

Pedro Rodriguez
- Created cardinal: by Boniface VIII, 1302

Personal details
- Born: Castile, ?
- Died: 20 December 1310 Avignon
- Buried: St. Peter's Basilica or the Chapel of the Constable
- Denomination: Catholic

Pedro Rodríguez de Quexada or Petrus Hispanus (died 20 December 1310, in Avignon) was an ecclesiastic from Castile.

== Ecclesiastical biography ==
He was a canon of Burgos Cathedral and the chaplain of Cardinal Benedetto Caetani, who after his rise to the papacy as Pope Boniface VIII appointed Rodriguez Bishop of Burgos in 1300. Boniface VIII then established him as Cardinal-bishop of Sabina in the papal consistory of 15 December 1302. At that time, Rodriguez also received the administration of San Juan and San Pablo.

Rodriguez and Nicola Boccasini were the only ones who remained with Pope Boniface during the outrage of Anagni that Guillaume de Nogaret, Guillaume de Plasian and Sciarra Colonna executed against the pope that year.

Rodriguez participated in the papal conclave of 1303 that proclaimed Pope Benedict XI, and that of 1304-1305 which elected Clement V. He served as a Papal legate in England, arranging a peace between the kings Philip IV of France and Edward I of England, and as governor of Terni.

== Death and burial ==
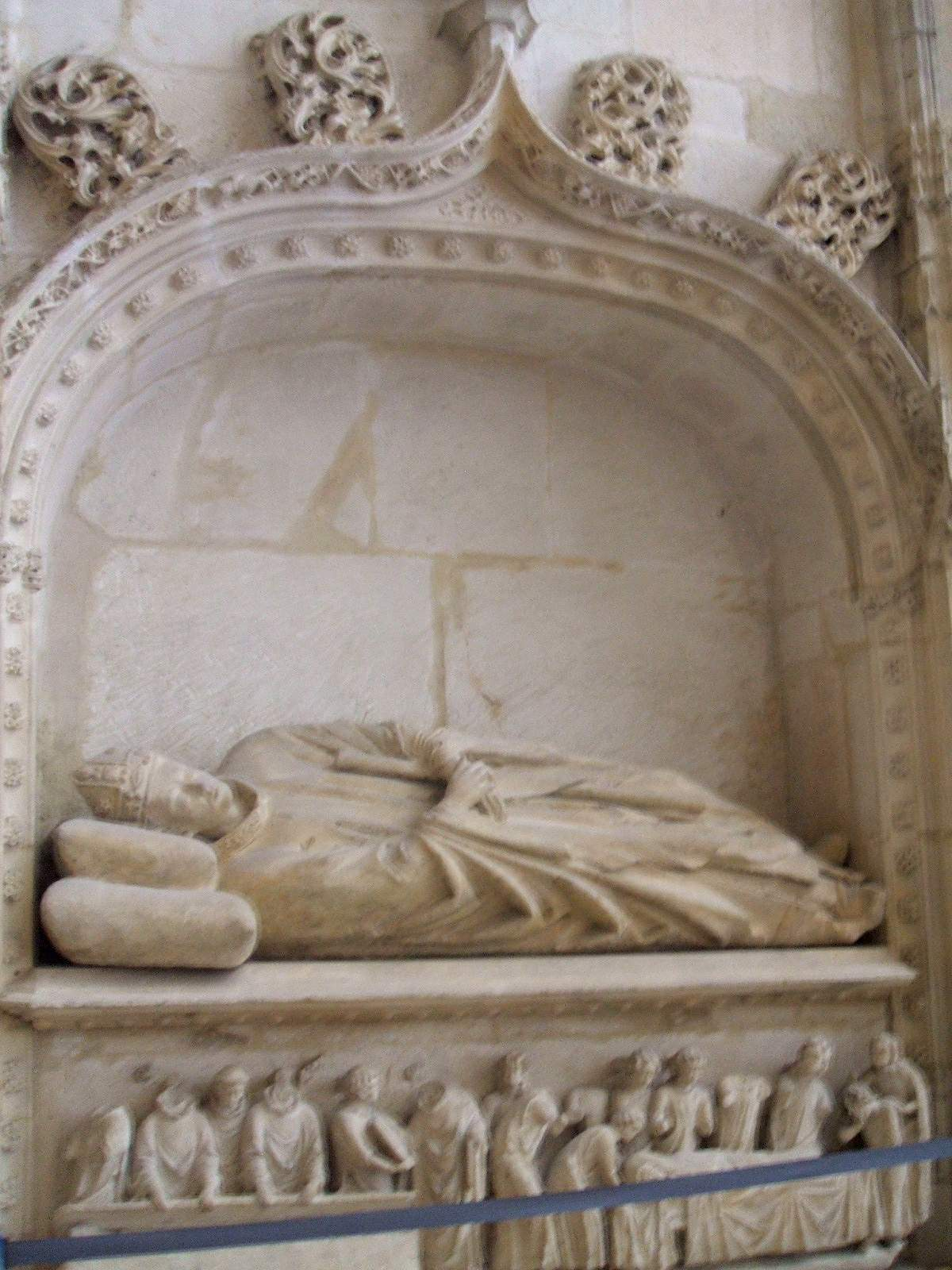
The tomb of Bishop Don Pedro Rodriguez

Rodriguez died in the papal court at Avignon in late 1310, was transferred to Rome, and buried in the St. Peter's Basilica with Boniface VIII.

However, the documentation of the Burgos Cathedral still has him listed as being buried there, in the chapel of San Pedro (now Chapel of the Constable), where one can see his cenotaph; thus, some historians deny his cardinalship, claiming that the Cardinal and the Bishop of Burgos were two different people.
