= Clericis laicos =

Bull issued by Pope Boniface VIII in 1296

Clericis laicos was a papal bull issued on February 5, 1296, by Pope Boniface VIII in an attempt to prevent the secular states of Europe—in particular France and England—from appropriating church revenues without the express prior permission of the pope. The two expansionist monarchies had come to blows, and the precedents for taxation of the clergy for a "just war" if it was declared a crusade and authorized by the papacy had been well established. The position of Boniface was that prior authorization had always been required and that the clergy had not been taxed for purely secular and dynastic warfare.

== Background ==
Boniface VIII viewed conflict between England and France as a particularly grave matter. As long as France was at war, it was less likely to be able to offer him any assistance in Italy, and both were unlikely to participate in any expedition to the Holy Land. The hostilities with France also brought increased exactions on the English church to finance them. Benedict sent cardinal nuncios to each court in hope of a brokered truce, but their efforts were unsuccessful.

At a time when the laity were taxed an eleventh on their movable goods, or a seventh if they lived in town or on a royal demesne, the clergy, under Archbishop of Canterbury Robert Winchelsey, offered a tenth for national defense. King Edward I declined and suggested rather a quarter or a third.

The Fourth Lateran Council of 1215 reiterated a principle, found in the Lateran Council of 1179, that a secular power might not tax Church property without first obtaining permission from the pope. It had become accepted practice. Philip IV had himself observed it in 1288 in collecting a tenth over three years. With the war with Edward I, however, he dispensed with the formality in his new decime and so triggered protests from the French clergy and complaints to Rome.

== Content ==
The bull decreed that all prelates or other ecclesiastical superiors who under whatsoever pretext or color shall not, without authority from the Holy See, pay to laymen any part of their income or of the revenue of the Church, likewise all emperors, kings, dukes, counts, etc. who shall exact or receive such payments, incur eo ipso the sentence of excommunication.

James F. Loughlin, writing in the Catholic Encyclopedia (1903), sees this as expressing two underlying principles: (1) That the clergy should enjoy equally with the laity the right of determining the need and the amount of their subsidies to the Crown; and (2) That the head of the Church ought to be consulted when there was question of diverting the revenues of the Church to secular purposes.

The bull was criticized for the vehemence of its tone and exaggerated indictment of the laity of all times. Its opening statement asserted that "the laity have been from the most ancient times hostile to the clergy", which even modern scholars have called "a palpable untruth" given the enormous enthusiasm and devotion most laymen were still showing to many of the clergy. The bull was also attacked for its failure to make clear the distinction between the revenues of the purely ecclesiastical benefices and the "lay fees" held by the clergy on feudal tenure. The advisers of Philip were quick to take advantage of the Pope's hasty language and, by forcing him to make explanations, put him on the defensive and weakened his prestige.

Clericis laicos was a reminder of the traditional principle. Surprised by the strong reaction of the French crown and pressure from the French bishops seeking a compromise, in July 1297 Boniface issued another bull, Etsi de statu, which allowed lay taxation of clergy without papal consent in cases of emergency.

Nonetheless, Clericis laicos was included by Pope Boniface in his collection of canon law, the Liber Sextus Decretalium. Only after the death of Boniface's successor, Benedict XI, would the canonists begin treating the bull as truly revoked.

== Etsi de statu ==
Etsi de statu was a papal bull issued by Pope Boniface VIII in July 1297. The bull was essentially a revocation of Clericis laicos, which had fully prohibited the taxation of clerical property by lay authorities without the explicit consent of the papacy. Etsi de statu allowed it in cases of emergency.

Clericis laicos had been chiefly directed at Edward I of England and Philip IV of France, who had levied taxes on the clergy to finance their war over control of Duchy of Aquitaine. France had responded, however, with an embargo on export of gold or silver, effectively prohibiting Rome from accessing any of its revenues from France. At the same time, Boniface had to contend in Rome with a suspiciously convenient uprising against him by the Colonna family. The Pope was obliged to back down and issue the more accommodating Etsi de statu.

== Text ==
- Clericis laicos in APOSCRIPTA Database - Lettres des papes (French CNRS, UMR 5648), letter n. 11000.
