= Napoleone Orsini (cardinal) =

Italian cardinal

Cardinal Napoleone Orsini
- Cardinal-Deacon
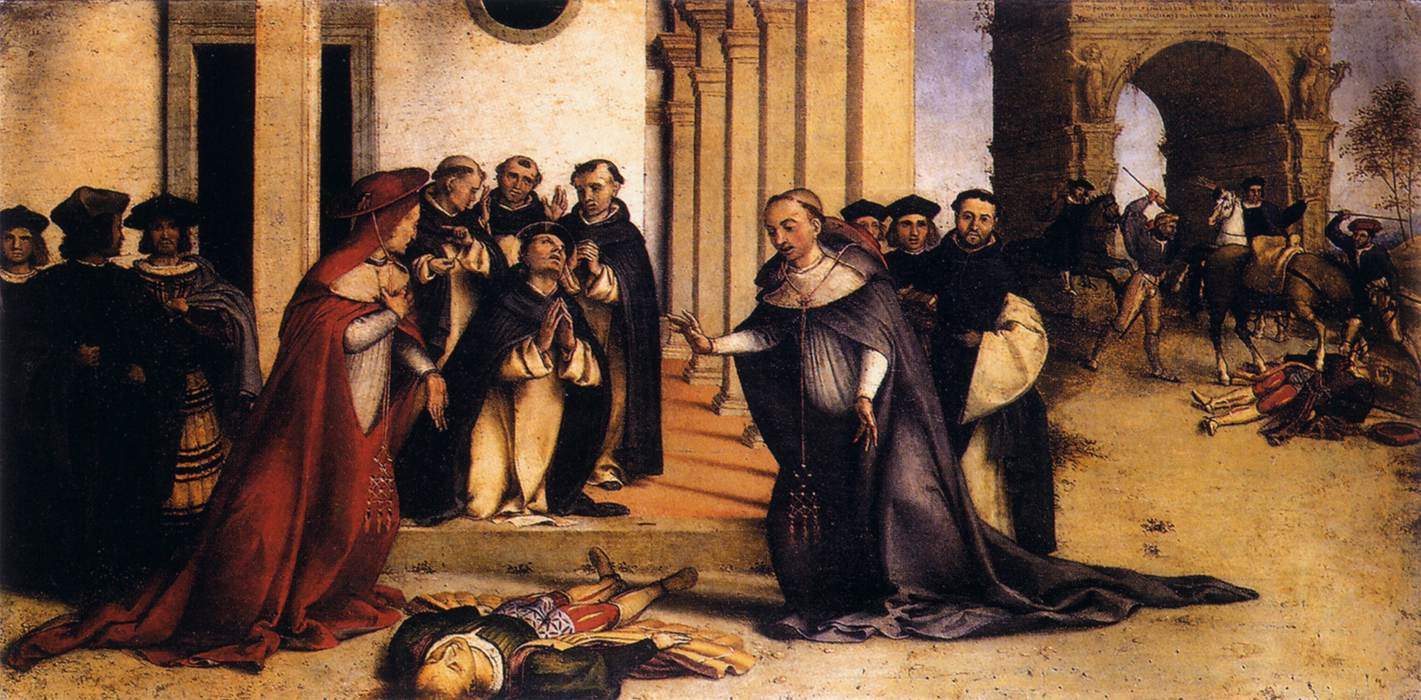
- Church: Sant' Adriano
- Predecessor: Ottobono Fieschi (1251–1276)
- Successor: Rinaldo Orsini (1350–1374)

Orders
- Created cardinal: 16 May 1288 by Pope Nicholas IV

Personal details
- Born: 1263 Rome
- Died: 24 March 1342 (aged 78–79) Avignon, France

Napoleone Orsini (1263 – 24 March 1342) was a Roman cardinal. His ecclesiastical career lasted 57 years, 54 of them as a cardinal, and included six conclaves.

Born in Rome to Rinaldo Orsini, Lord of Monterotondo and of Marino, son of Matteo Rosso Orsini 'il Grande'; and Ocilenda, perhaps the daughter of Stefano II Conti, perhaps of a member of the house of Boveschi. Rinaldo was a brother of Pope Nicholas III and of Cardinal Giordano Orsini. Napoleone took holy orders in 1285 and was named a papal sub-chaplain by Honorius IV. He is attested as papal chaplain on February 18, 1286. He rose quickly in the ecclesiastical hierarchy, and in a consistory held by Pope Nicholas IV on 16 May 1288, he was appointed a cardinal deacon and assigned the Deaconry of S. Adriano.

During the pontificate of Boniface VIII his gift for diplomacy was put to wide use and he was named legate to Spoleto and Ancona on 27 May 1300. In this capacity, in 1301, he retook the city of Gubbio, which had rebelled against the Papal State. An opponent of the Colonna family, he was a supporter of Boniface' Italian crusades.

From 1303 to 1341 Cardinal Napoleone was Prebend of Sutton cum Beckingham in the diocese of Lincoln. He was appointed Canon and Prebend of Suthcave in the Church of York (before September 21, 1304), a benefice which he held until 1342.

In 1305, after the conclave of 1304–1305 and two weeks after his coronation, the new pope, Clement V, made him Archpriest of S. Peter's Basilica in Rome.

During the Avignon Papacy Napoleone realigned himself with the Colonna and testified against Boniface at the latter's posthumous trial.

Cardinal Napoleone Orsini participated prominently in the long conclave of 1 May 1314 to 5 September 1316, following the death of Clement V. There was, to be sure, a long intermission in the proceedings, caused by multiple forces which began with dissensions among the retinues of the cardinals, included an attempt to set fire to the conclave, and the direct involvement of the royal family of France. The conclave finally elected a Gascon, Cardinal Jacques Duèse, on 7 August 1316. He was crowned in the Cathedral of S. Etienne in Lyon on 5 September 1316.

Immediately after the election, even before the coronation, Cardinal Napoleone managed to obtain from the new pope for the benefit of his cousin Paul de Comite, a papal chaplain, the reversion of a canonry and prebend in the Church of Lichfield; and for the benefit of another cousin Peter de Comite the confirmation of a canonry and prebend in the Church of London.

In the conclave of 1334, following the death of Pope John XXII, he participated as senior cardinal deacon, prior Diaconum. The conclave began on 13 December 1334 in the Apostolic Palace in Avignon with twenty-four cardinals in attendance. On the evening of 20 December 1334, they chose Cardinal Jacques Fournier, O.Cist., of Savardun near Toulouse, in the Diocese of Pamiers, who adopted the name Benedict XII. On 8 January 1335, he was crowned by Cardinal Napoleone Orsini in the Dominican Church in Avignon.

Cardinal Napoleone was diplomatically active during the pontificates of Pope Clement V and Pope John XXII.

He wrote his Testament at Avignon on 13 April 1337, and revised it on 13 February 1342. He died at the age of seventy-nine in 1342, at Avignon, only one month before the death of Pope Benedict XII. He had participated in six conclaves, and narrowly missed his seventh.

== Bibliography ==
- Stephanus Baluzius (Etienne Baluze), Vitae Paparum Avenionensium Volume I (Paris 1693).
- Augustinus Theiner (Editor), Caesaris S. R. E. Cardinalis Baronii, Od. Raynaldi et Jac. Laderchii Annales Ecclesiastici Tomus Vigesimus Quartus 1313–1333 (Barri-Ducis: Ludovicus Guerin 1872); Tomus Vigesimus Quintus 1334–1355 (Barri-Ducis: Ludovicus Guerin 1872).
- F. Savio, "Le tre famiglie Orsini di Monterotondo, di Marino, e di Manoppello," Bolletino della societa umbra di storia patria 2 (Perugia 1896), 89–112. [in Italian]
- Albert Huyskens, Kardinal Napoleon Orsini (Marburg: J. A. Koch 1902). [in German]
- Raffaello Morghen, "Orsini, Napoleone," Enciclopedia Italiana (1935). [in Italian]
- Sandro Carocci, Baroni di Roma. Dominazioni signorili e lignaggi aristocratici nel Duecento e nel primo Trecento (Roma: Istituto storico italiano per il Medio Evo 1993). [in Italian]
- G. Tabacco, "Papa Giovanni XXII e il cardinale Napoleone Orsini di fronte alla Cristianità europea," in: C. Alzati (ed.), Cristianità ed Europa. Miscellanea di studi in onore di L. Prosdocimi (Roma-Freiburg-Wien 1994), pp. 155–173. [in Italian]
- Christian Trottmann, "Giovanni XXII," Enciclopedia dei Papi (2000). [in Italian].
- Giulia Barone, "Orsini, Napoleone," Dizionario Biografico degli Italiani Volume 79 (2013). [in Italian]
