= Teodorico Ranieri =

Italian cardinal

Teodorico Ranieri of Orvieto (died 7 December 1306) was an Italian cardinal. He was archbishop of Pisa, and bishop of Palestrina.

In 1298 Ranieri was instrumental in the destruction of the city of Palestrina on the orders of Pope Boniface VIII, following the anti-papal revolt of the Colonna family. He was then made a cardinal in December of that year, and from 1300 until his death was the Camerlengo of the Holy Roman Church.

Ranieri came from an ecclesiastical family; his uncle was the bishop of Piacenza and his brother Zampo was bishop of Soana, and of Pietro.

The Palazzo Ranieri in Orvieto is named after a medieval tower once owned by Cardinal Ranieri.
