= Luca Fieschi =

Italian cardinal

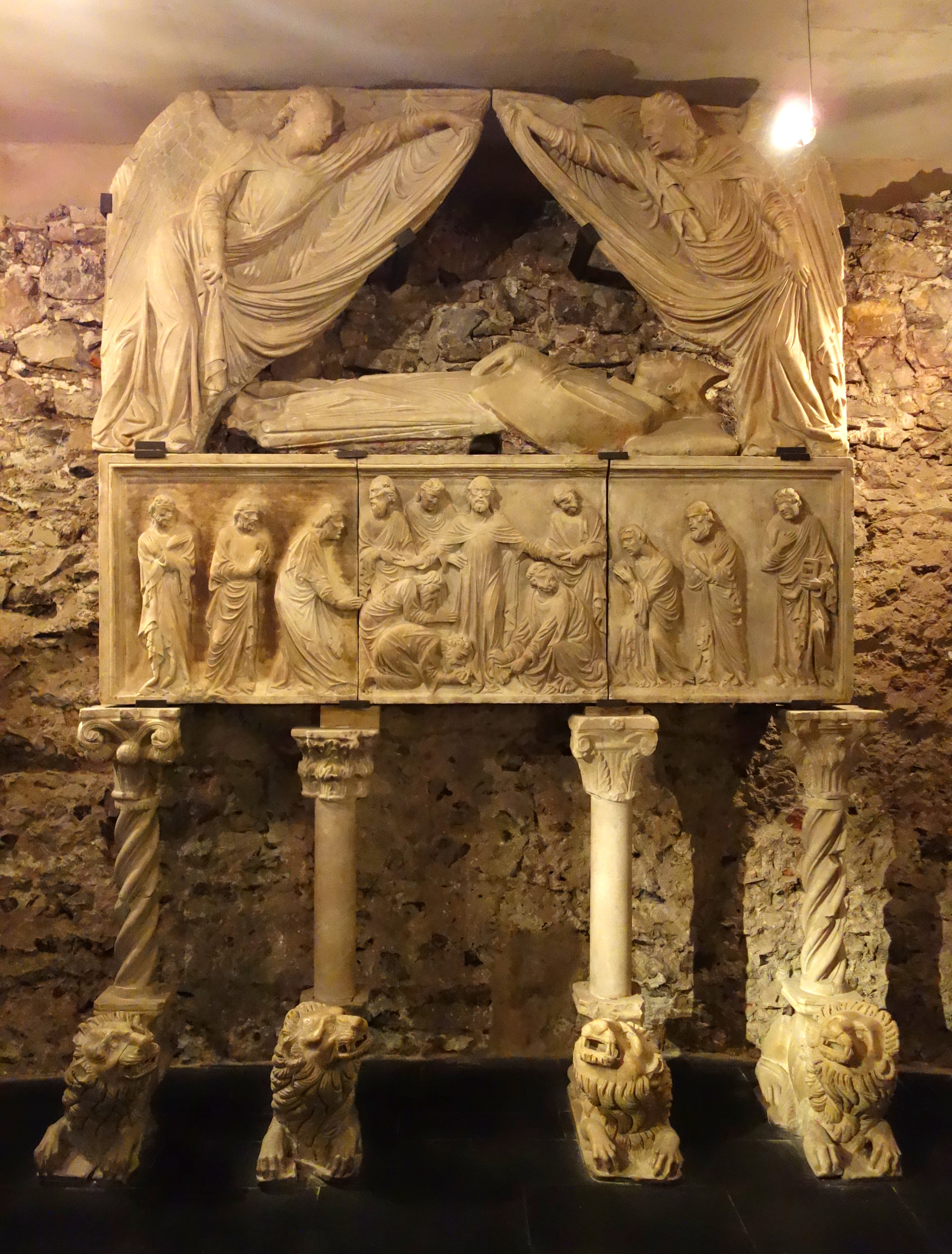
Tomb of Luca Fieschi in Genoa

Luca Fieschi (c. 1275 – 31 January 1336) was a Genoese nobleman and from 1300 a Roman Catholic cardinal.

A member of the Fieschi family and a relative of the Plantagenets, he held benefices in England and Italy. Although politically a Guelph, he was chosen to be a part of the papal delegation that accompanied Henry VII of Germany in Italy in 1311–1312. In 1317–1318, he was part of a legation to England and Scotland that failed to end the Anglo-Scottish war. His later years were spent in Avignon, where he amassed great wealth and a large household.

== Family ==
Fieschi was born around 1275 or slightly earlier to Niccolò di Tedisio, count of Lavagna, and Leonora (Lionetta). His great uncle was Pope Innocent IV. In 1276, his paternal uncle became Pope Adrian V. Fieschi relations included the Malaspina family and the Visconti of Milan.

He was also related to the Plantagenets, the ruling family of England. In 1301, he was referred to as a kinsman of King Edward I. The exact relationship is unclear, but was through Fieschi's mother, whose ancestry is uncertain. She must have been descended either from Count Thomas I of Savoy or from Giacomo del Carretto. According to his own testimony in 1300, Fieschi was also related to King James II of Aragon, which suggests a Savoyard connection. He was either the third or fourth cousin of Edward II of England.

== Early career ==
By 1297, Fieschi was a papal chaplain and subdeacon. In 1297, he succeeded his elder brother, Brancaleone, in a canonry of the diocese of Lichfield, being exempted from the requirements of residency and age. In 1298, he was made a canon of Paris. In March 1300, Pope Boniface VIII appointed him to the cardinalate as deacon of Santa Maria in Via Lata. At the same time, he was assigned the churches of Santi Cosma e Damiano and San Marcello al Corso, which had been taken from Boniface's personal enemy, Cardinal Giacomo Colonna. In 1301, he visited England.

According to a late and unreliable tradition, Fieschi rallied the citizens of Anagni to rescue Boniface when the latter was imprisoned by conspirators during the Affair of Anagni in 1303.

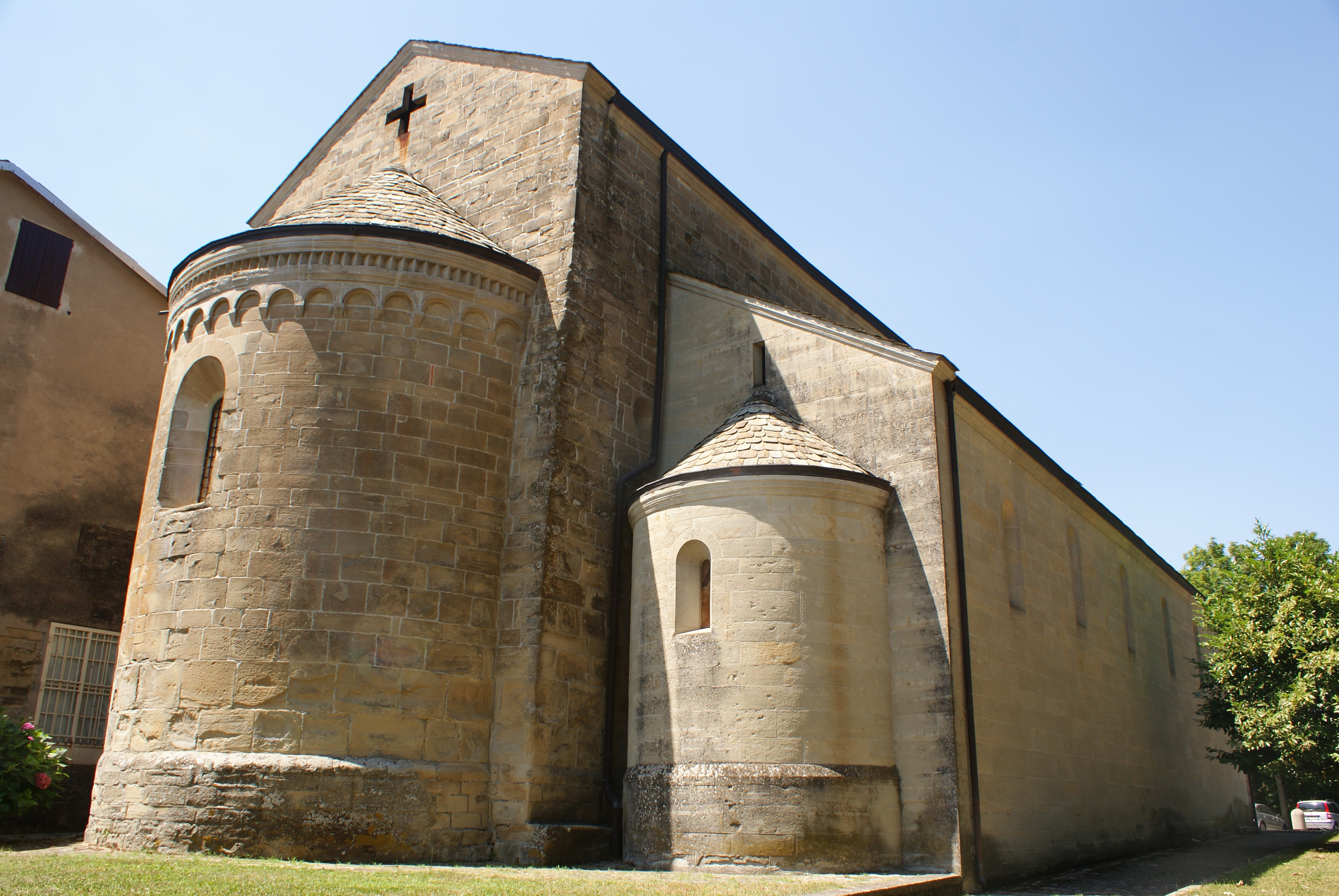
Monastery of Marola

During the pontificate of Benedict XI (1303–1304), Fieschi received an English prebend formerly belonging to his cousin, Leonardo Fieschi, and incomes from the monasteries of Marola and Campagnola. In the 1304–1305 papal conclave, he supported Cardinal Matteo Rosso Orsini before the latter's death. He travelled to Lyon to attend the coronation of Clement V. At the invitation of the Black Guelph faction, he stopped in Florence along the way and received gifts. Clement granted him new incomes in Orvieto and the right to assign the benefices of San Salvatore di Lavagna.

== Italian years, 1311–1316 ==
After Clement moved to Avignon in 1309, Fieschi continued to work in Italy. In the summer of 1311, he was part of the papal delegation sent to meet Henry VII of Germany, who was marching into Italy for his imperial coronation. The other delegates were Cardinals Arnaud de Faugères and Niccolò da Prato. The delegation met the emperor at the siege of Brescia, where Fieschi helped negotiate the surrender of the city. The cardinals followed Henry to Genoa in October and to Rome, where he was crowned on 29 June 1312. Niccolò anointed Henry, while Arnaud and Fieschi invested him with the mitre, diadem, orb, sceptre and sword on behalf of the absent pope. After the coronation, Fieschi received a gift of money from Henry, whom he followed to Tivoli. He left the emperor before the siege of Florence and went to Lucca.

In Lucca, Fieschi was charged by Clement V with safeguarding the papal treasure that the late Cardinal Gentile da Montefiore had been bringing from Rome to Avignon at his death in October 1312. He and Niccolò da Prato deposited it in the Dominican convent there, but in 1314 it was plundered by Uguccione della Faggiuola. While still at Lucca in 1313, Fieschi seems to have negotiated with imperial representatives to secure the appointment of himself and his brothers, Carlo and Ottobono, as lords of the castle of Pontremoli, which their father had received as an imperial fief from King William in 1251.

== Anglo-Scottish legation, 1317–1318 ==
In 1316, Pope John XXII succeeded Clement V. He demanded Fieschi justify his continued absence in writing. He also withheld from him the subsidy granted to the other cardinals on the occasion of his coronation. Fieschi returned to Avignon after five years in Italy on 17 November 1316. In May 1317, he left Avignon with Cardinal Gauscelin de Jean on a legation to reconcile Edward II of England and Robert I of Scotland and to instruct Edward to turn over the former properties of the Templars to the Hospitallers.

Fieschi and Jean arrived in Dover in June 1317 and were in London by 17 June. In July, they set out for Scotland. On 1 September 1317, while escorting the bishop-elect Louis de Beaumont and his brother, Henry de Beaumont, to Durham for the former's consecration and enthronement, they were robbed by Gilbert de Middleton and his men near Rushyford. The Beaumonts were taken captive, while the cardinals were allowed to go on to Durham. Their goods, however, were seized. Some of their entourage were killed. In response, the pope sent them 1,000 florins in compensation. Durham Priory granted Fieschi a lifetime pension of 100 florins, according to the chronicle attributed to Robert de Graystanes. The cardinals excommunicated Middleton and his associates and, per the Vita Edwardi Secundi, suspended their mission until they had received satisfaction from Parliament. The king gave £346 to Fieschi for his troubles.

The mission to Scotland was a failure, as Robert I refused to make peace with Edward II. The papal truce terms were published by the cardinals in London on 27 November, but were never published in Scotland. On 21 or 21 October, the pope wrote the cardinals warning them of his impending bull Execrabilis, which would revoke all benefices in England held in plurality for papal provision. During their legation, Fieschi and Jean also visited Oxford University and intervened in the ongoing Canterbury–York dispute. Fieschi appointed a procurator for his benefices in Lichfield and Tirrington for a term of twelve years. He also received some benefices from the king. The legates departed London for Avignon on 18 September 1318.

== Avignonese years, 1319–1336 ==
In 1319–1322, Fieschi reportedly became a close confidant of King Robert of Naples, who often stayed at Avignon. In 1319, he lent 9,500 florins to the Guelphs of Genoa to help finance their defence against the Ghibelline siege. He took the Sacro Catino relic as collateral. It was final returned when the loan was repaid in 1340. In 1322, the pope assigned him and Cardinal Giovanni Gaetano Orsini to reconcile Robert with King James II of Aragon. According to the Catalans Vidal de Vilanova and Ferrer d'Abella, he was a staunch defender of the Aragonese policy at the time of the conquest of Sardinia in 1323.

In 1321, Pontremoli was captured by Castruccio Castracani degli Antelminelli. In March and May 1325, Fieschi received royal protection from Edward II, but there is no evidence that he visited England.

Galvano presenting his works to the pope, from a manuscript once belonging to Fieschi

Fieschi was a patron of the physician and crusade theorist Galvano da Levanto. Nevertheless, he was opposed to the planned crusade of Philip V of France and urged John XXII to spend the assigned money closer to home. He had developed a reputation for extravagant living. He rented eight houses in Avignon, one for twenty years at the time of his death. His household consisted of around a hundred servants, including fifteen chaplains, four physicians and two notaries. One of his household was Manuele Fieschi, author of the Fieschi Letter. His library contained around a hundred books, about a third of them pertaining to canon law. He owned an autograph copy of the Decretals of Innocent IV and a probable autograph copy of Galvano da Levanto's theological treatises. One of his chaplains, Dondinus of Pavia, dedicated a work on papal power to John XXII.

== Death ==
Fieschi drew up his final will at Avignon on 31 January 1336. He died later that same day. His body was embalmed and brought to Genoa for burial in the cathedral of San Lorenzo. In his will, he endowed a new chapel in San Salvatore di Lavagna and another dedicated to Santa Maria Maggiore in Roccatagliata. He also left money for the construction of two churches in Genoa, Santa Maria in Via Lata and one in Carignano. The rights he inherited in Pontremoli from his brother Federico he left to the descendants of his brother Carlo. His tomb in Genoa was carved by a master connected with the school of Giovanni Pisano.

Because of the great wealth which he left behind, more is recorded about Fieschi's death than his life. A collection of 24 letters addressed to Fieschi is preserved in the Library of the Metropolitan Chapter of Saint Vitus Cathedral in Prague. It has been edited and published by Zdeňka Hledíková. Three of the letters concern Armenia, Egypt and Beirut.

== Bibliography ==
- Ameri, Gianluca; Di Fabio, Clario (2011). Luca Fieschi cardinale, collezionista, mecenate (1300–1336). Milan.
- Boespflug, Thérèse (1997). "Fieschi, Luca". Dizionario Biografico degli Italiani (in Italian). Vol. 47: Ferrero–Filonardi. Rome: Istituto dell'Enciclopedia Italiana. ISBN 978-88-12-00032-6.
- Bombi, Barbara (2019). Anglo-Papal Relations in the Early Fourteenth Century: A Study in Medieval Diplomacy. Oxford University Press.
- Bowsky, William M. (1974). Henry VII in Italy: The Conflict of Empire and City-state, 1310–1313. Greenwood Press.
- Hledíková, Zdeňka, ed. (1985). Raccolta Praghese di Scritti di Luca Fieschi. Prague.
- Holmes, George (1988). "Review of Hledíková 1985". The English Historical Review. 103 (409): 1030. doi:10.1093/ehr/CIII.CCCCIX.1030. JSTOR 570299.
- Maddicott, John (1970). Thomas of Lancaster, 1307–1322: A Study in the Reign of Edward II. Oxford University Press. ISBN 978-0-19-821837-1.
- Menache, Sophia (1998). Clement V. Cambridge University Press.
- Middleton, Arthur E. (1918). Sir Gilbert de Middleton and the Part He Took in the Rebellion in the North of England in 1317. Mawson Swan and Morgan Limited.
- Mortimer, Ian (2010). Medieval Intrigue: Decoding Royal Conspiracies. Continuum.
- Prestwich, Michael (2003). "Gilbert de Middleton and the Attack on the Cardinals, 1317". In Timothy Reuter (ed.). Warriors and Churchmen in the High Middle Ages: Essays Presented to Karl Leyser. Hambledon Press. pp. 179–194.
- Nold, Patrick (2025). Dondinus Papiensis, Dyalogus de potentia summi pontificis: A Dialogue on the Power of the Supreme Pontiff. Oxford University Press.
- Polzer, Joseph (2005). "S. Maria della Spina, Giovanni Pisano and Lupo di Francesco". Artibus et Historiae. 26 (51): 9–36. doi:10.2307/1483773. JSTOR 1483773.
- Salvatelli, Luca (2015). "The Manuscript Vat. lat. 2463: Some Considerations about a Medieval Medical Volume of Galvanus de Levanto" (PDF). Medical Manuscript Studies. 1: 1–7.
- Wright, John Robert (1980). The Church and the English Crown, 1305–1334: A Study Based on the Register of Archbishop Walter Reynolds. Pontifical Institute of Mediaeval Studies.
