= Giovanni Boccamazza =

Italian Cardinal

- Cardinal-Bishop of Frascati
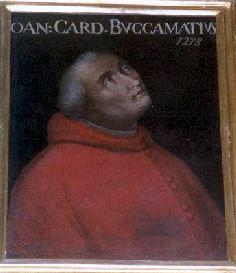
- Church: Catholic Church
- Diocese: Suburbicarian Diocese of Frascati
- In office: 22 December 1285 – 10 August 1309
- Predecessor: Ordoño Álvarez
- Successor: Berengar Fredol the Elder
- Previous posts: Administrator of Monreale (1285-1286); Archbishop of Monreale (1278-1285)

Orders
- Created cardinal: 22 December 1285 by Pope Honorius IV

Personal details
- Born: Rome, Papal States
- Died: 10 August 1309 Avignon, Comtat Venaissin, Papal States

Giovanni Boccamazza (died 1309) was an Italian Cardinal. He was from the Roman nobility, and was a nephew of Cardinal Giacomo Savelli, who had been an important figure in the Roman Curia since his creation as cardinal in 1261.

== Early career ==
On 14 May 1264, Giovanni was granted the benefice of the church of S. Fortunato de Vernot in the Diocese of Sens. In 1285, Giovanni's uncle, Cardinal Savelli, was elected Pope Honorius IV. Giovanni Boccamazza began his career in the Church as a Canon of the Vatican Basilica and Chaplain of Pope Nicholas III (1277-1280).

== Bishop of Monreale ==
He was made Archbishop of Monreale, near Palermo, by Pope Nicholas III on 15 August 1278. He had not, however, been the original choice as bishop. The Chapter of the Cathedral of Monreale had originally and unanimously chosen Guillaume, Bishop of Potenza, but he declined the position and resigned the election into the hands of the Pope. The matter was referred to the usual committee of cardinals on episcopal elections, in this case composed of Cardinals Latino Malabranca Orsini, Guillaume de Bray, and Matteo Rosso Orsini. Nicholas then received the bishop's resignation of the election to Monreale and sought to appoint Bernard de Montemirato, OSB, the Abbot of Montismajoris in the Diocese of Arles. But he flatly refused. Nicholas then chose his Chaplain, Giovanni Boccamazza. He was there at the time of the Sicilian Vespers (1282). It was Cardinal Boccamazza who delivered the news of the Sicilian Vespers to King Charles I of Anjou After fleeing Sicily, he was made cardinal-bishop of Frascati on 22 December 1285—the only cardinal created by Pope Honorius.

== Legate in Germany ==
As soon as Honorius IV became pope, he was approached by King Rudolf of Germany, King of the Romans, with regard to his coronation as Holy Roman Emperor. This honor had been promised him by Gregory X in 1275, but succeeding popes had not authorized the coronation. Now he approached the new pope through the new Archbishop of Mainz, Heinrich de Isnay, O.Min. (1286-1288). In reply Honorius sent Cardinal Giovanni Boccamazza as Apostolic Legate to Germany, Bohemia, Hungary and Sweden to engage in conversations with Rudolf. Cardinal Giovanni attended the significant synod of March 1287 in Würzburg, considered as a German national council. On 22 July 1287, during the Sede Vacante following the death of Honorius IV (1285-1287), he was at Cambrai, where he issued orders for Dacia and Suecia. While he was at Cambrai the Legate, Cardinal Giovanni was attacked by a nobleman, Nicholas, his brothers and sons, and his retainers, while he was in church. When that attempt failed, they followed him to his house, where there was a riot. The bishop of Cambrai, who held both spiritual and temporal power in the city, was excommunicated by Cardinal Giovanni, and the city was placed under interdict. When Cardinal Giovanni returned to Rome and explained the whole affair to Pope Nicholas personally, the Pope cited the Bishop, the Archdeacon, the Bailli, the Chapter of the Cathedral, and numerous others, to appear before his court in Rome. The case was finally disposed of on 3 October 1291 with the suspension of the Bishop from his pontifical powers and right to collate to benefices for three years. Also, during the same Legatine assignment, Cardinal Giovanni became involved in strife between the Dominicans and the people of Strasbourg, and he felt compelled to lay the city under the Interdict. On 16 September 1287 Cardinal Giovanni was at Clairvaux, and he was still there on 8 November, when he wrote to the Archbishop of Uppsala, Sweden (Suecia), and 6 December 1287, when he wrote to the Dominicans of Hungary and Poland. He wrote from Novaevallis, on 14 December, to all of the clergy in his Legation for the benefit of the Cistercians. He did not, therefore, attend the Conclave of 1287-1288.

== Work in the Roman Curia ==
He was back in Italy, at Rieti, in September, 1288, when he subscribed a bull for Pope Nicholas IV. Later in the year, in Rome, he was a member of an examination committee of an abbot-elect. On 28 January 1289 he is mentioned as having been an Auditor in the case involving the canonical election of a bishop of Avignon. Two days later he was assigned the task of consecrating the newly approved Archbishop of Crete. In September 1290 Cardinal Giovanni served on the examination committee that investigated the contested election to the Bishopric of Alatri. In March 1291, he was a member of the committee that reviewed the election of the Abbot of S. Albans. At nearly the same time, he did the same in the case of the monastery of S. Pietro in Perugia.

On 5 March 1291, Pope Nicholas granted Cardinal Giovanni Boccamazza the power to investigate and reform the apparently large number of encroachments and illegal occupations made by various persons upon the properties belonging to the Lateran Basilica. The Senators and other magistrates of Rome were ordered to assist the Cardinal in restoring the properties of S. Giovanni Laterano. The same service was imposed on Cardinal Giovanni with respect to the Premonstratensian monastery of S. Quirico de valle introducti in the diocese of Reate. He was then empowered to do the same for the Monastery of Farfa.

At the end of November 1295, Cardinal Giovanni was present and working in the Roman Curia, and was one of eighteen cardinals who received a distribution from the funds of the Treasury of the College of Cardinals. On 12 March 1296, he was one of twenty-one cardinals who received a 1/18 share in the payment of 2000 livres Tournois presented by the Procurators of the Abbot of Cluny. At Easter 1296, he had his share of 600 gold florins presented by the Archbishop of Florence; and likewise a share in the 400 gold florins presented by the Bishop of Tortona in Lombardy. On 29 April, he shared in the 600 florins paid by the Bishop of Famagusta. At Pentecost 1296, eighteen cardinals shared in the 1900 florins presented by the Bishop of Séez; and a distribution of the 500 livres Tournois paid by the Archbishop of Rouen; and a 1/23 share in the 50 livres of the Bishop of Teramo. On 29 June 1296, there was a distribution of 500 florins paid by the Bishop of Patras. Around the Feast of S. Michael, 29 September 1296, he received a share of the payment made through the bankers of the Abbot of S. Victor of Marseille. On 10 May 1297, he was present at the degrading of Cardinals Jacobus and Petrus Colonna, from whose confiscated income Pope Boniface VIII granted a half to the cardinals, nineteen of whom are named, included Giovanni of Tusculum. He also participated in a distribution of 5 gold pieces which had been offered by the Archbishop of Strigonia at his ad limina visit. On 24 June 1297, he was one of twenty-two cardinals who received his share of the money offered by the Abbot of S. Justinus in Padua; of the money offered by the Bishop of Padua; and of the money brought by the Proctor of the Bishop of Siena.

At Easter 1298, the Archbishop of Tours visited Rome, and presented the College of Cardinals with 200 livres Tournois, which was divided among fourteen cardinals, including Giovanni of Tusculum. At the same time, the sum of 2500 florins out of the payment of the Bishop of Zaragoza was distributed to the same cardinals; and a distribution from the sum of 2000 florins paid by the Bishop of Pamiers. On 20 May 1298, the 500 florins brought by the Bishop of Lodève was shared by eighteen cardinals in the Curia; at the same time there was a distribution of the 1000 gold florins paid by the Bishop of Urgel; and a distribution from the 500 livres Tournois presented by the Archbishop of Rouen. On 2 June 1298, the Abbot of Subiaco paid 300 gold florins owed by his predecessor, which was shared by twenty cardinals. On 5 September 1298, there was a distribution of the payment of 180 livres Tournois made by the Abbot of the Major Monasterium in Tours, with a 1/15 share coming to Cardinal Giovanni of Tusculum. These are only examples, showing the very large, if irregular, income of a cardinal at the time, and indicating that a cardinal was present in the Roman Curia at the time. Cardinals who were not present in the Curia (except occasionally deceased cardinals, whose estates benefitted from a late payment of dues) did not share in the distributions; this applied to Papal Legates, who had to be paid by the Pope through the Apostolic Camera, not by the Camera of the College of Cardinals.

On 1 February 1301, Cardinal Giovanni of Tusculum, who had been acting as Assessor (judge) on appointment by Boniface VIII, pronounced his verdict in the case of the contested election of Leo, Bishop of Soli in Cyprus. On 20 May 1301, he and three other cardinals, Jean de Cressi, Robert de Pontigny and Matteo Rosso Orsini, were given the mandate to choose a new Abbot of the Monastery of S. Richard in the Diocese of Amiens. In June 1301, he was Auditor in the request that the Cathedral of Sagunto be transferred from regular to secular clergy. On 20 September 1301, his name heads the list of fifteen cardinals, ahead of Bishops Theoderic (Civitas Papalis) and Leonardo (Albano), subscribing to the papal grant of privileges to the Monastery of Santa Croce Saxivivo in the Diocese of Foligno. Cardinal Niccolò Boccasini, OP, Bishop of Ostia, who would normally have signed first as senior Cardinal Bishop, was serving as Legate in Hungary. When the year 1301 began, the Curia was resident at the Lateran Palace in Rome; from 1 May to mid-October it was in Anagni; from 17 October to the end of the year it was back at the Lateran.

In January 1302, Cardinal Giovanni served on a committee to examine the election of the Bishop of Cammin in Germany. On 2 July 1302, he is noted as having on a committee which examined the election and person of John, Abbot of Holy Cross Monastery in Waltham in the Diocese of London.

In 1302, Cardinal Giovanni Boccamazza was Canon of the Cathedral of Amiens.

At the beginning of 1303, Cardinal Giovanni was consulted by the Pope concerning the depredations which had taken place against the Chapter of the Cathedral of Cambrai.

== Papal Elector ==
He participated in five papal conclaves, which saw the elections of popes Nicholas IV in 1288, Celestine V in 1294, Boniface VIII in 1294, Benedict XI in 1303 and Clement V in 1305. He became dean of the Sacred College of Cardinals in 1302, upon the death of Cardinal Gerardo Bianchi, Bishop of Sabina (1 March 1302).

== Reign of Benedict XI ==
On 30 October 1303, a week after his election, Pope Benedict gave the College of Cardinals a gift of 2680 gold florins, 380 livres Tournois, and over 600 other gold coins of various origins and values. These funds were distributed among the Cardinals, including Cardinal Giovanni Boccamazza, except for the Bishop of Ostia, Niccolò Boccasini, who was absent on a Legateship.

In 1304 Cardinal Giovanni was again a member of a committee of cardinals that examined the election of an abbot for the Benedictine monastery of S. Maria de Alfiolo in the Diocese of Gubbio; and likewise for the Benedictine Monastery of S. Angelo de Gaifa in the Diocese of Urbino;

On 4 March 1304 Pope Benedict XI (1303-1304) granted Cardinal Giovanni Boccamazza subinfeudation of three castles, Scandrillia, Castellucii, and Rocca Soldana, which belonged to the Monastery of Farfa by primary infeudation of the Roman Church, along with their tenements and vassals, with full jurisdiction and authority. The properties and their rights would descend to the Cardinal's heirs.

== Death ==
Pope Nicholas IV had granted Cardinal Giovanni the privilege of making his own Will on 25 November 1289. He died in Avignon on 10 August 1309 and was buried in the Church of the Dominicans

== See also ==
- Cardinals created by Honorius IV

== Bibliography ==
- Bernhard Pawlicki, Papst Honorius IV. Eine Monographie (Münster 1896).
- Agostino Paravicini Bagliani, "Alfonso Ceccarelli, gli «Statuta Urbis» del 1305, e la Famiglia Boccamazza," in Raymundus Creytens and Pius Künzle (editors), Xenia Medii Aevi Historiam Illustrantia. Oblata Thomae Kaeppeli o.p. (Roma: Edizioni di Storia e Letteratura, 1978), pp. 317–350.
- Agostino Paravicini Bagliani, I Testamenti dei Cardinali del Duecento (Roma: Presso la Società alla Biblioteca Vallicelliana, 1980), pp. 77–78.
- Jochen Johrendt, Die Diener des Apostelfürsten: das Kapitel von St. Peter im Vatikan (11.-13. Jahrhundert) (Berlin: Walter de Gruyter, 2011), pp. 186, 451-452.
- Werner Maleczek: Die Urkunden des päpstlichen Legaten Johannes Boccamazza, Kardinalbischofs von Tusculum, aus den Jahren 1286 und 1287. (Legation ins Reich in der Spätzeit König Rudolfs von Habsburg). In: Archiv für Diplomatik, Schriftgeschichte, Siegel- und Wappenkunde 59 (2013), pp. 35–132 DOI:10.7788/afd.2013.59.jg.35.
