= Walter of Winterburn =

English Dominican, cardinal, orator, poet, philosopher, and theologian

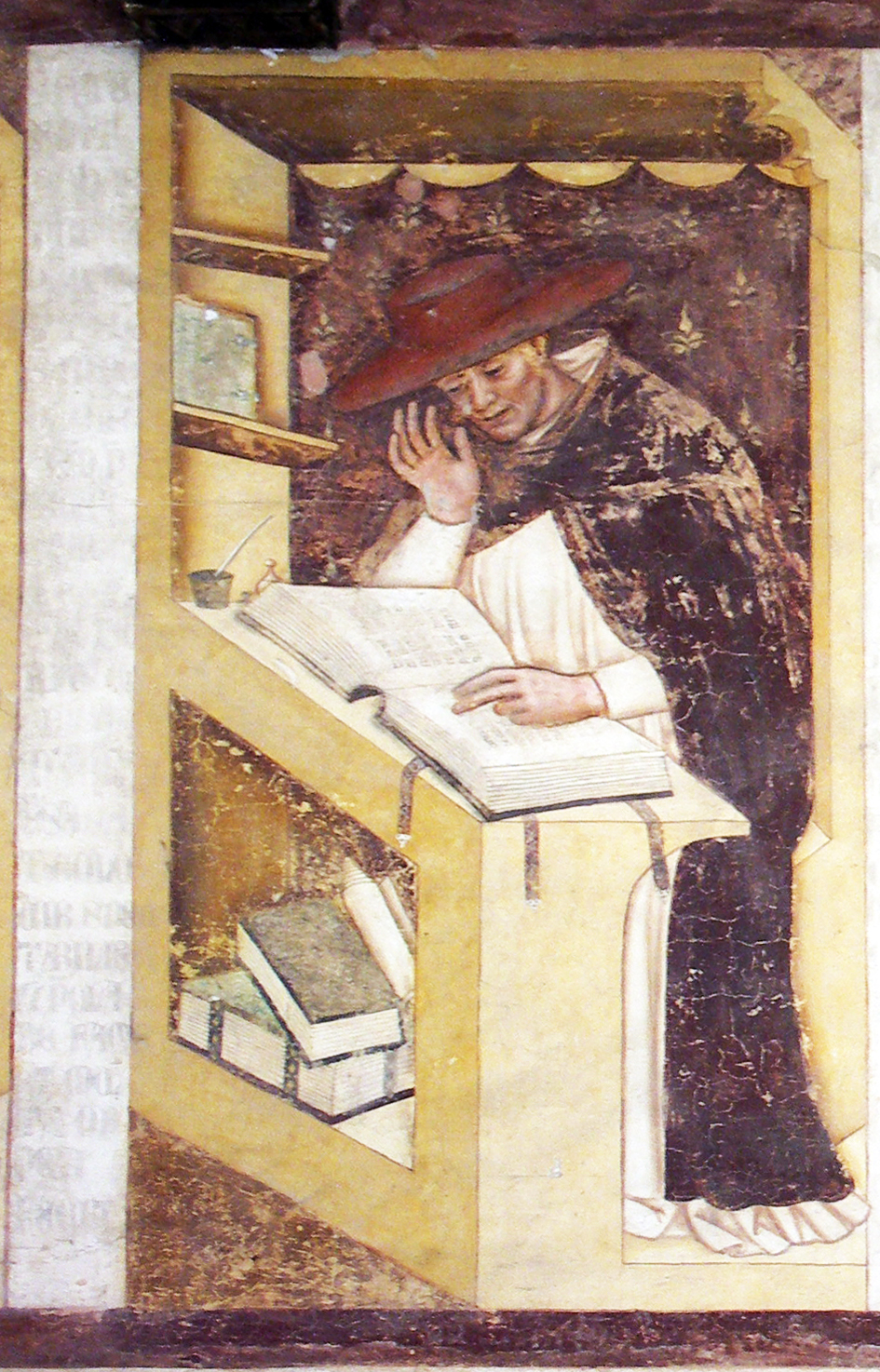
30 Gualtiero Winterbourne.jpg

Walter of Winterburn (1225 – 26 August 1305) was an English Dominican, cardinal, orator, poet, philosopher, and theologian.

He entered the Dominican Order when a youth, and became renowned for learning, prudence, and sanctity of life. Edward I, King of England, chose him as his confessor and spiritual director. He was provincial of his order in England from 1290 to 1298, and was created cardinal on 21 February 1304 by Pope Benedict XI.

In 1305, after having taken part in the election of Clement V, Walter set out from Perugia with several other cardinals to join the pope in France, but at Genoa he was seized with his last illness, during which he was attended by the dean of the Sacred College, Nicholas de Prato. His remains were first buried in the church of his order at Genoa, but were later transferred to London, as he had ordered, and interred in the convent to which he had formerly been assigned.

Nicholas Trivet, an English Anglo-Norman chronicler who was a close friend, wrote that Walter of Winterburn was a man endowed with many superior qualities, natural and supernatural. According to Trivet, he was thoroughly versed in knowledge, graced with rare modesty and a kindly disposition—a model of religious piety and of mature erudition who despite numerous duties in the cloister and at the imperial Court never shortened his hours of prayer.

He left several works on philosophy and theology, chief among them:

- Commentarium in IV sententiarum libros
- Quaestiones theologicae, much in use at that time
- Sermones ad clerum et coram rege habiti
