= Pope Benedict XI =

Head of the Catholic Church from 1303 to 1304

Pope Blessed Benedict XI
- Bishop of Rome
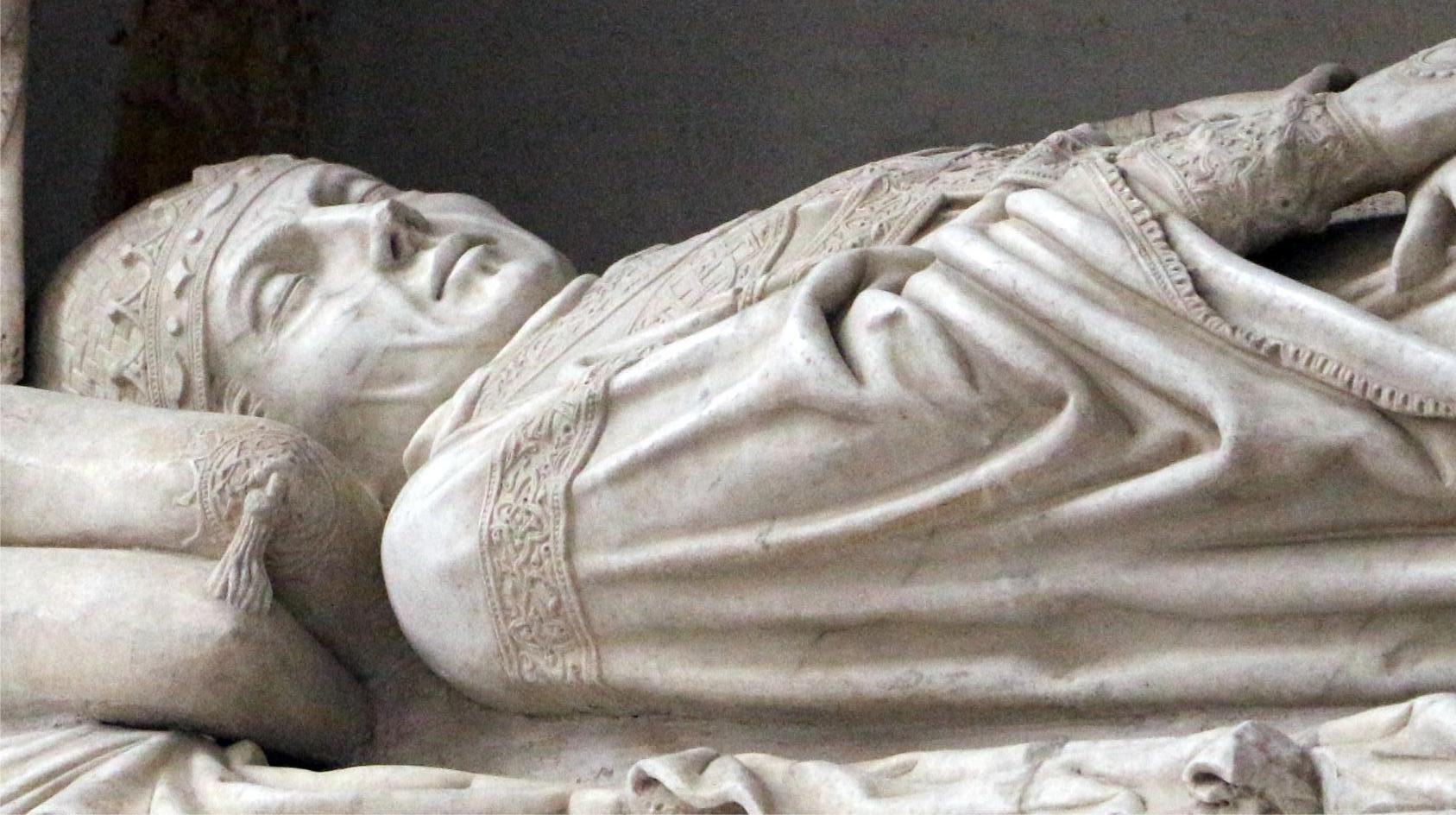
- Tomb effigy in the church of San Domenico, Perugia, made c. 1305
- Church: Catholic Church
- Papacy began: 22 October 1303
- Papacy ended: 7 July 1304
- Predecessor: Boniface VIII
- Successor: Clement V
- Previous posts: Master of the Order of Preachers (1296–1303); Cardinal-Priest of Santa Sabina (1298–1300); Cardinal-Bishop of Ostia (1300–1303)

Orders
- Ordination: 1300
- Consecration: March 1300
- Created cardinal: 4 December 1298 by Boniface VIII

Personal details
- Born: Nicola Boccasini; 1240 Treviso, Italy
- Died: 7 July 1304 (aged 63–64) Perugia, Papal States
- Motto: Illustra faciem Tuam super servum Tuum (Latin for 'Let Your Face shine upon Your servant')
- Coat of arms

Sainthood
- Feast day: 7 July
- Beatified: 24 April 1736; Rome, Papal States by Pope Clement XII
- Attributes: Dominican habit; Papal vestments; Papal tiara
- Patronage: Treviso

Pope Benedict XI (Latin: Benedictus XI; 1240 – 7 July 1304), born Nicola Boccasini (Niccolò of Treviso), was head of the Catholic Church and ruler of the Papal States from 22 October 1303 to his death on 7 July 1304.

Boccasini entered the Order of Preachers in his native Treviso. He studied at Venice and Milan before becoming a teacher in Venice and in other Dominican houses. He served two terms as Provincial Prior of Lombardy, before being elected Master of the Order in 1296. Two years later, he was made cardinal. He was appointed Bishop of Ostia, and served as papal legate first to Hungary, and then to France. He was with Pope Boniface VIII when Boniface was attacked by French forces at Anagni.

He was beatified with his cultus confirmed by Pope Clement XII in 1736. He is a patron of Treviso.

== Early life ==
Niccolò Boccasini was born in Treviso to Boccasio, a municipal notary (died 1246), whose brother was a priest; and Ber(n)arda, who worked as a laundress for the Dominican friars of Treviso. Boccasini had a sister, Adelette. The family lived outside the walls of Treviso, in a suburb called S. Bartolommeo.

In 1246, a Dominican friar left a sum of money in his will to Bernarda and her children, recently orphaned. A condition was that if Boccasini were to enter the Dominican Order he would receive half of the entire legacy. From the age of six, it seems, Boccasini was destined for the monastic life. His first teacher was his uncle, the priest of S. Andrea.

He entered the Order of Preachers in 1254, at the age of fourteen, taking the habit of a novice in his native Treviso. He was taken to Venice by his Prior and presented to the Provincial, who assigned him to the convent of SS. Giovanni e Paolo in Venice. For the next seven years or so, Boccasini pursued his basic education in Venice. Toward the end of this period, he served as a tutor to the young sons of Romeo Quirini of Venice, whose brother was a Canon in the Cathedral of Treviso.

In 1262, Boccasini was transferred to Milan, to the new studium of S. Eustorgio. He spent the next six years at S. Eustorgio. By the end of his term at S. Eustorgio he must have become a professed member of the Order of Preachers; the actual date is unknown. As a professed brother he served in the responsible position as a lecturer in the studium in Venice, that is to say, he was in charge of the elementary education of the brothers in his convent.

Each convent had its lector. He served as lector for fourteen years, from 1268 to 1282, according to Bernardus Guidonis. In 1276 he is attested as being lector at the Dominican convent in his native Treviso, a post he was still holding in 1280. In February 1282 he is found at Genoa, again as lector. He was not a professor, since he had never taken a university degree, being one of the last popes who was not a university graduate.

== Office and responsibility ==
In 1286, at the meeting of the Provincial Chapter, which took place that year in Brescia, Boccasini was elected Provincial Prior of Lombardy. As Provincial of Lombardy, Boccasini's lifestyle changed considerably. Instead of being firmly attached to a single convent for years, he instead became peripatetic, moving from one convent to another on visits of inspection, encouragement and correction. In Lombardy at the time there were some fifty-one convents.

He had responsibility as an Inquisitor, a task for which popes considered Franciscans and Dominicans especially suited. He had the responsibility of convening the Provincial Chapters. In 1287, the Chapter was at Venice; in 1288, it was at Rimini; in 1289 at the General Chapter, which was held at Trier, Boccasini was released from the office of Provincial of Lombardy, having completed his three-year term. It is probable that, without office, he returned to a convent, possibly that of Treviso—though the evidence is scanty and based on wills and codicils.

He was elected Provincial Prior of Lombardy again, however, at the Provincial Chapter held at Brescia in 1293. In 1294 it was held at Faventia, in 1295 at Verona, and in 1296 at Ferrara, where Boccasini's successor was elected, since he had a new assignment.

=== Master General of the Order of Preachers ===
At the Capitulum Generale of the Order of Preachers, which was held at Strasbourg in 1296, Boccasini was elected Master of the Order of Preachers, and issued ordinances that forbade public questioning of the legitimacy of Pope Boniface VIII's papal election (which had taken place on Christmas Eve, 1295) on the part of any Dominican.

=== Cardinalate ===
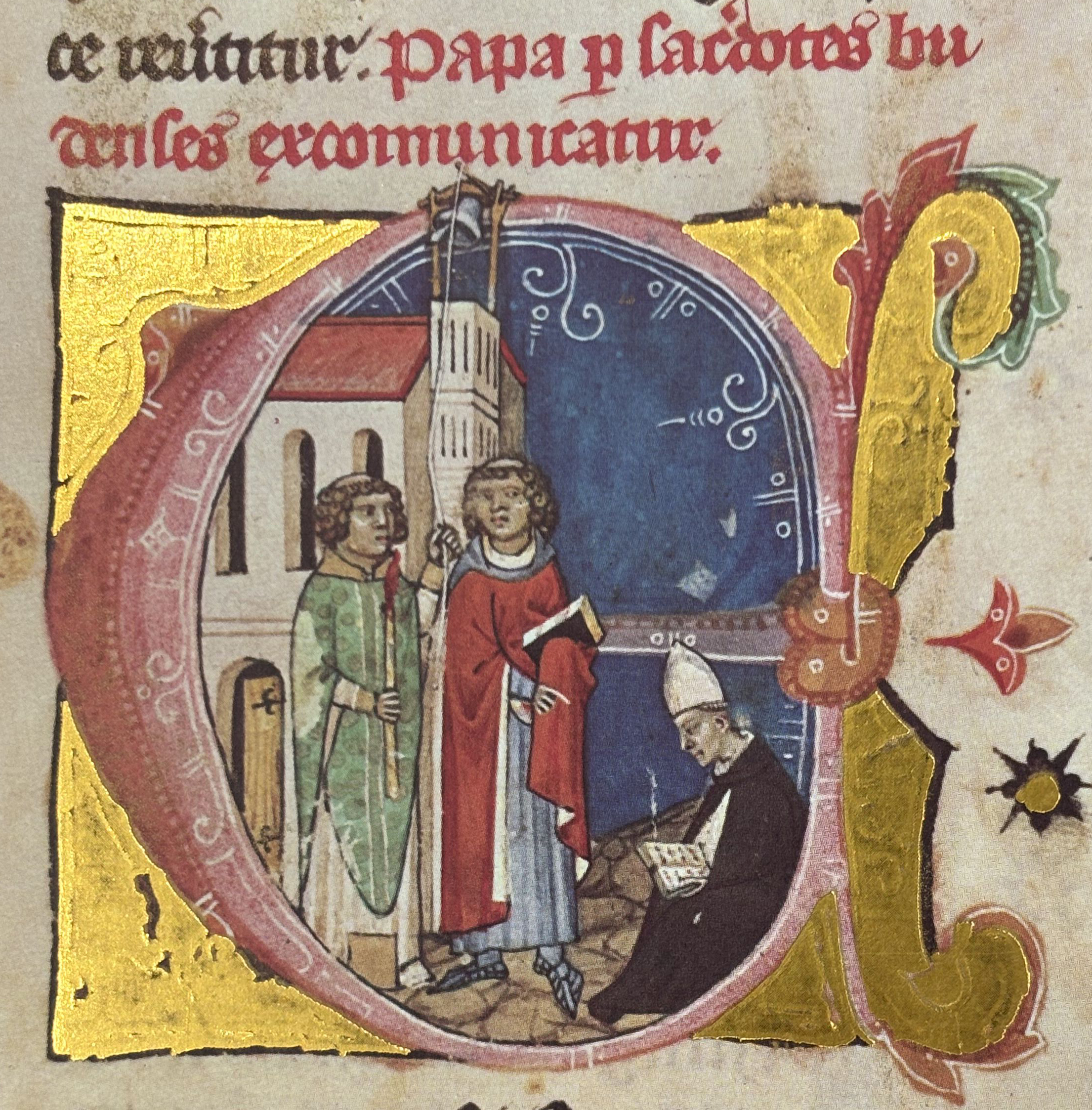
The clergymen in Buda excommunicate Pope Benedict XI, as depicted by the Illuminated Chronicle

Boccasini was elevated to the cardinalate on 4 December 1298 by Boniface VIII, and assigned the title of Cardinal-Priest of Santa Sabina. He entered the Roman Curia on 25 March 1299 and thus began to receive his share of the profits of the Chamber of the College of Cardinals.

He was promoted to the rank of Cardinal-Bishop of the See of Ostia on 2 March 1300 and also received episcopal consecration. On 13 May 1301, he was appointed Apostolic Legate to Hungary. He made his official departure on 22 June 1301 and returned on 10 May 1303. He also served as papal legate to France.

When Pope Boniface VIII was seized at Anagni in September 1303, Boccasini was one of only two cardinals to defend the Pope in the Episcopal Palace itself. The other was Pedro Rodriguez, Bishop of Sabina. They were imprisoned for three days. On Monday 10 September, they were liberated by forces led by Cardinal Luca Fieschi, and on 14 September, the Pope and his retinue returned to Rome, with an escort organized by Cardinal Matteo Rosso Orsini.

== Papacy ==
=== Papal election ===
The conclave to elect the successor of Boniface VIII was held in the Basilica of Saint John Lateran and the College of Cardinals desired an appropriate candidate who would not be hostile towards King Philip IV of France. After one ballot in a conclave that lasted a day, Boccasini was elected as pope.

=== Actions ===
He was quick to release King Philip IV from the excommunication that had been put upon him by Boniface VIII. Nevertheless, on 7 June 1304, Benedict XI excommunicated Philip IV's implacable minister Guillaume de Nogaret and all the Italians who had played a part in the seizure of his predecessor at Anagni. Benedict XI also arranged an armistice between Philip IV of France and Edward I of England.

After a brief pontificate that spanned a mere eight months, Benedict XI died suddenly at Perugia. As original reports had it, suspicion fell primarily on Nogaret with the suspicion that his sudden death was caused by poisoning. There is no direct evidence, however, to either support or disprove the contention that Nogaret poisoned the pope. Benedict XI's successor, Clement V was in France when elected and never journeyed to Rome. His successors resided principally in Avignon, inaugurating the period known as the Avignon Papacy. He and the French popes who succeeded him were completely under the influence of the kings of France.

Benedict XI also celebrated two Consistories for the purpose of creating new cardinals. The first, on 18 December 1303, elevated Nicholas Alberti da Prato, the Bishop of Spoleto; and William Macclesfield (Marlesfeld) of Canterbury, Prior of the English Province of the Dominicans. On 19 February 1304 he elevated Walter of Winterburn of Salisbury, the confessor of King Edward I of England, who did not want to part with him, and kept him in England for some time. By the time he arrived in Perugia on 28 November 1304, Pope Benedict was dead. Cardinal Winterburn died at Genoa on 24 September 1305. All three new cardinals were members of the Dominican Order.

Benedict XI was the author of a volume of sermons and commentaries on the Gospel of Matthew, the Psalms, the Book of Job, and the Book of Revelation.

=== Stories ===
Cardinal Caesar Baronius (1538–1607) wrote that, on the Monday of Easter week in 1304, Benedict XI was celebrating Mass, but a pilgrim interrupted it, because he wanted the pope to hear his confession. Rather than telling him to find another time or another priest to have his confession, the Pope left the Mass to hear his confession and then returned to continue the Mass. This appears to be an anecdote, appropriate for a sermon recommending frequent confession, placed in an age when twice annual confession was the norm. It is unlikely that a pilgrim would attempt to interrupt a Mass, that a priest would interrupt a Mass for some other function, or that the protocols of the papal Court would permit such an unfettered close approach to the pontiff during a sacred service.

There is also a story that, at the General Chapter of the Dominicans at Lucca in May 1288, the Provincial of the Roman Province, Thomas de Luni predicted to Boccasini that he would someday be pope. On another occasion, when he was in Venice, a friar of Torcello predicted that he would be Provincial, Master General, Cardinal and Pope.

=== Beatification ===
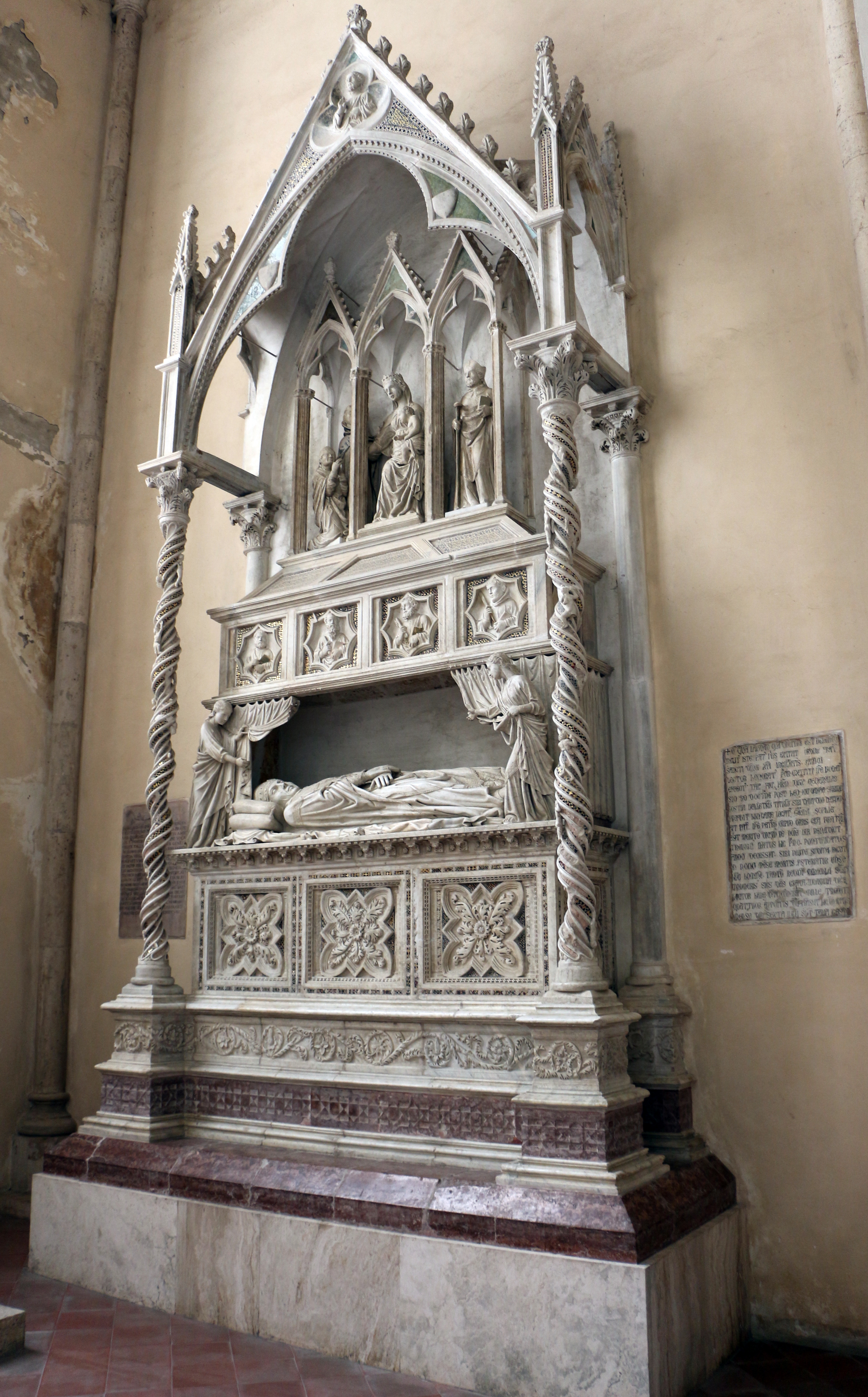
The tomb of Benedict XI.

Pope Blessed Benedict XI
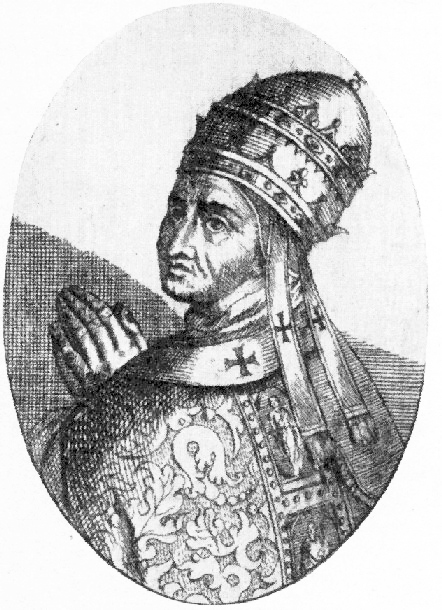

Pope; Confessor of the Faith
- Born: Niccolò Boccasini; 1240; Treviso, Republic of Venice
- Died: 7 July 1304 (aged 63-64); Perugia, Papal States
- Venerated in: Catholic Church
- Beatified: 24 April 1736, Rome, Papal States by Pope Clement XII
- Feast: 7 July
- Attributes: Papal vestments Papal tiara Dominican habit
- Patronage: Treviso

Benedict XI earned a reputation for holiness and the faithful came to venerate him. His tomb gained a reputation for the amount of miracles that emerged from the site. Pope Clement XII approved his cultus on 24 April 1736 which acted as his formal beatification. Pope Benedict XIV extended his veneration to the Republic of Venice in 1748 after a request from the Venetians.

=== Papal numbering ===
A note on the numbering: Pope Benedict X (1058–1059) is now considered an antipope by the Catholic Church. At the time of Benedict XI's election, however, Benedict X was still considered a legitimate pope, and thus the man the Catholic Church officially considers the tenth true Pope Benedict, Niccolo Boccasini, took the official number XI rather than X. This has advanced the numbering of all subsequent Popes Benedict by one digit. Popes Benedict XI-Benedict XVI are, from an official point of view, the 10th through 15th popes by that name.

== See also ==
- Cardinals created by Benedict XI
- List of popes

== Bibliography ==
- Ch. Grandjean (editor), Le Registre de Benoit XI (Paris 1905).
- Jacques Échard, Scriptores ordinis prædicatorum recensiti, notisque historicis illustrati ad annum 1700 auctoribus Tomus I (Paris 1719), pp. 444–447.
- Bernard Guidone, "Vita Benedicti Papae XI," and "Vita Clementis Papae V," in Ludovicus Antonius Muratori, Rerum Italicarum Scriptores Tomus Tertius (Milan 1723), 672–679.
- A. Touron, Histoire des hommes illustres de l' Ordre de Saint Dominique Tome premier (Paris 1743), pp. 655–704.
- J.-B. Christophe, L' histoire de la papauté pendant le XIV. siècle Tome premier (Paris: L. Maison 1853) 78–175.
- Lorenzo Fietta, Niccolò Boccasini e il suo tempo (Padova 1874).
- Martin Souchon, Die Papstwahlen von Bonifaz VIII bis Urban VI (Braunschweig: Benno Goeritz 1888).
- Charles Grandjean, "Benoît XI avant son Pontificat, 1240–1303," Mélanges d' archéologie et d' histoire 8 (1888), 219–291.
- Paul Funke, Papst Benedikt XI. (Munster 1891).
- Heinrich Finke, Aus den Tage Bonifaz VIII. Funde und Forschungen (Münster 1902).
- Ferdinando Ferretton, Beato Benedetto XI Trivigiano (Treviso:Enrico Martinelli 1904).
- Daniel Antonin Mortier, Histoire des Maîtres généraux de l' Ordre des Frères Prêcheurs II (Paris 1905), pp. 319–353.
- Ferdinand Gregorovius, History of Rome in the Middle Ages, Volume V.2 second edition, revised (London: George Bell, 1906), Book X, chapter 6.
- Heinrich Finke, Acta Aragonensia. Quellen zur deutschen, italianischen, franzosischen, spanischen, zur Kirchen- und Kulturgeschichte aus der diplomatischen Korrespondenz Jaymes II. (1291–1327) (Berlin und Leipzig 1908)
- Ingeborg Walter, "Benedetto XI, bl." Enciclopedia dei Papi (2000).
- Marina Benedetti, Benedetto XI, frate Predicatore e papa (Milano: Biblioteca francescana, 2007).
- Friedrich Wilhelm Bautz (1975). "Benedikt XI". In Bautz, Friedrich Wilhelm (ed.). Biographisch-Bibliographisches Kirchenlexikon (BBKL) (in German). Vol. 1. Hamm: Bautz. col. 486. ISBN 3-88309-013-1.
- Vito Sibilio: Benedetto XI. Il papa tra Roma e Avignone (= Dissertationes historicae. Band 30). Roma 2004. (Fachbesprechung)
- Georg Schwaiger (1980). "Benedikt XI". Lexikon des Mittelalters, I: Aachen bis Bettelordenskirchen (in German). Stuttgart and Weimar: J. B. Metzler. col. 1860–1861. ISBN 3-7608-8901-8.
- Ingeborg Walter: Benedetto XI, beato. In: Massimo Bray (ed.): Enciclopedia dei Papi. Volume 2: Niccolò I, santo, Sisto IV. Istituto della Enciclopedia Italiana, Rome 2000 (treccani.it)

Catholic Church titles
Preceded by Stephen of Besançon	Master General of the Dominican Order; 1296–1298	Succeeded by Albert of Chiavari
Preceded by Leonardo Patrasso	Cardinal-Bishop of Ostia; 1300–1303	Succeeded by Nicolò Albertini
Preceded by Boniface VIII	Pope; 22 October 1303 – 7 July 1304	Succeeded by Clement V
