= Jura regalia =

Rights of a monarch in medieval Europe

Jura regalia were the legal rights in medieval Europe that belonged exclusively to the king, either as essential to his sovereignty (jura majora, jura essentialia), such as royal authority, or as accidental (jura minora, jura accidentalia), such as hunting, fishing and mining rights. Many sovereigns in the Middle Ages and in later times claimed the right to seize the revenues of vacant episcopal sees or abbeys as a regalian right. In some countries, especially in France. where it was known as droit de régale (French: [dʁwa də ʁeɡal]), jura regalia came to be applied almost exclusively to that assumed right. A liberty was an area in which the regalian right did not apply.

== Rationale ==
It is a matter of dispute on what ground the temporal rulers claimed the revenues of vacant dioceses and abbeys. Some hold that it is an inherent right of sovereignty; others state that it is a necessary consequence of the right of investiture; others make it part of the feudal system; still others derive it from the advowson, or right which patrons or protectors had over their benefices. Ultimately, it had its origin in the assumption that bishoprics and imperial abbeys, with all their temporalities and privileges, were royal estates given as fiefs to the bishops or abbots, and subject to the feudal laws of the times. At first the right was exercised only during the actual vacancy of a see or abbey, but it was later extended over the whole year following the death of the bishop or abbot. Often, the temporal rulers also claimed the right to collate all the benefices that became vacant during the vacancy of a diocese, with the exception of those to which the cure of souls was attached.

== History ==
It is difficult to determine when and where the jura regalia was first exercised. In the West Frankish Kingdom, it made its first appearance probably towards the end of the Carolingian dynasty, that is, in the course of the 10th century.

=== England ===
In England, the exact practice prior to the Norman Conquest of England in 1066 is unclear, but for monasteries, it is likely that the bishop or the prior administered the estate, and that the revenues did not go to the king. Under King William the Conqueror, the record is also unclear, but the absence of monastic complaints suggests that revenues did not go to the royal treasury.

It is first mentioned in connection with King William II of England, who, after the death of Lanfranc in 1089, kept the Diocese of Canterbury vacant for more than three years, during which period the king seized all the archiepiscopal revenues. William II was also known for keeping other bishoprics and abbeys vacant so that his own officials could administer them and keep the income for the king, although recent studies have shown that this was not quite as common as indicated by the complaints of medieval chroniclers. The income from the regalian right was an important, if irregular, source of income for the kings. At least in England under William II, there was a natural tendency to keep the more lucrative offices vacant longer than the poorer offices, thus allowing the royal revenue to be augmented.

Although William's successor, King Henry I, said at the start of his reign that he would abandon the practice of leaving ecclesiastical offices vacant to secure their revenue for himself, events soon required him also to exploit the regalian rights. Henry's most recent biographer, C. Warren Hollister, argued that Henry never intended to renounce the exercise of the regalian right, merely the abuses of it that William II was accused of by the monastic chroniclers. The Pipe roll from 1130 shows a number of vacant benefices whose revenues were going to the royal coffers.

During the reign of Henry II of England (1154–1189), it had become an established practice for the King of England to take possession of the revenues of all vacant dioceses although he generally allowed a division of revenues between the actual monks and the abbatial office and did not administer or touch the monks' income. Revenues from the regalian rights were normally paid into the Exchequer, who would record it on the pipe rolls. That the pope did not recognize the right is manifest from the fact that Pope Alexander III condemned Article 12 of the Council of Clarendon (1164), which provided that the king was to receive, as of seigniorial right (sicut dominicos), all income (omnes reditus et exitus) of a vacant archbishopric, bishopric, abbacy, or priory in his dominion. In 1176, Henry II promised the papal legate never to exercise the right of regalia beyond one year. With the exception of a few short periods, the right continued to be exercised by the English kings until the Protestant Reformation. The British Crown even today exercises it over the temporalities of vacant (Anglican) dioceses.

=== Germany ===
In Germany Emperor Henry V (1106–1125), Emperor Conrad III (1138–1152), and Emperor Frederick I (1155–1189) are known as the first to have claimed it. Frederick I exercised it in its utmost rigour and styles it "an ancient right of kings and emperors". King Philip of Germany reluctantly renounced it, together with the jus spolii to Pope Innocent III in 1203. Emperor Otto IV did the same in 1209. Emperor Frederick II renounced it to Innocent III first at Eger, on 12 July 1213 and then in the Privilege of Würzburg, in May 1216, and again to Pope Honorius III, at Hagenau, in September 1219. In 1238, he began to exercise it anew but only during the actual vacancy of dioceses, not for a whole year, as he had done previously. After the death of Frederick II, the claims of the German Emperors to this right gradually ceased. The revenues of vacant dioceses in Prussia went to the succeeding bishop; in Bavaria, to the cathedral church; in Austria, to the "Religionsfond".

Important regalia were the following:

- Right to allocate episcopal offices and to call synods,
- Ability to dispose of duchies, counties, margraviates and unclaimed territories,
- Duty to ensure internal peace (law and order),
- Ability to grant of protection to people who were not under the protection of the clan,
- Right to exercise the highest level of jurisdiction,
- Right to build royal palaces (Pfalzen),
- Right to nominate consuls,
- Sovereignty over transportation routes,
- Right to charge tolls (Zollregal),
- Right of coinage (Münzregal),
- Mining rights (Bergregal),
- Market rights (Marktregal),
- Salt rights (Salzregal),
- Fodrum (services for the maintenance of the imperial courts),
- Treasure rights (Schatzregal) (the rights to treasure trove),
- Fortification rights Befestigungsrecht,
- Right of escort (Geleitrecht),
- Jewish right of protection Judenregal (Judenschutzrecht),
- Water rights (Wasserregal),
- Hunting and fishing rights (Jagd- und Fischereiregal) or forest rights (Forstregal),
- Right to uninherited property, including the right of spoil (Jus Spolii or Spolienrecht)
- Amber rights (Bernsteinregal).

=== France ===
In France, the first mention of it is found during the reign of Louis VII, when in 1143, Bernard of Clairvaux complained in a letter to the Bishop of Palestrina that in the Church of Paris, the king had extended the droit de régale over a whole year. Pope Boniface VIII, in his bull Ausculta fili, of 5 December 1301, urged Philip the Fair to renounce it but without avail. In France, the right did not belong exclusively to the king but was exercised also by the Dukes of Normandy, Dukes of Brittany, Dukes of Burgundy, Counts of Champagne and the Counts of Anjou. Entirely exempt from it were the ecclesiastical province of Bordeaux, province of Auch, province of Narbonne, province of Arles, province of Aix, province of Embrun, and province of Vienne.

The Second Council of Lyons (1274) forbade anyone, under pain of excommunication, to extend the jus regaliae over any diocese that was then exempt from it, and in 1499, Louis XII gave strict orders to his officials not to exercise it over exempt dioceses. Towards the end of the 16th century, the restriction of the Council of Lyons began to be disregarded, and on 24 April 1608, the Parliament decided that the king had the droit de régale over all dioceses of France, but Henry IV of France did not carry that parliamentary decision into effect.

On 10 February 1673, Louis XIV issued a declaration extending the droit de régale to all of France. The Parliament was pleased, and most bishops yielded without serious protest, with only Nicolas Pavillon of Alet and François de Caulet, bishop of Pamiers, both of whom were Jansenists/ resisting. They at first sought redress through their metropolitans, but when the latter took the king's side, they appealed in 1677 to Pope Innocent XI. In three successive briefs, Innocent urged the king not to extend the right to dioceses that had previously been exempt. The General Assembly of the French clergy, held at Paris in 1681–1682, sided with the king, and despite the protests of Innocent XI, Alexander VIII, and Innocent XII, the right was maintained until the French Revolution.

Napoleon I attempted to restore it in a decree dated 6 November 1813, but his downfall the following year frustrated his plan. In 1880, the Third Republic again asserted the right and overstepped even the limits of its former application.

=== Switzerland ===
In what is now Switzerland, regalian rights first passed to regional lords through the donations and grants of counties made by the Burgundian king Rudolph III to the bishops of Basel and Sion (both in 999) and Lausanne (1011); in the late Middle Ages the bishop of Lausanne traced his rights back even further, to a donation of 896 interpreted as the prima donatio regalium.

The distance of the emperor and the general expansion of the High Middle Ages allowed the regional nobility to acquire the right of fortification (the right to build castles) and forest regalia, as seen in the lords who commissioned land clearances in the Prealps, such as the counts of Gruyère. The great dynasties—the Zähringen, Kyburg, Habsburg, and Savoy—consolidated their territorial power by exercising regalian rights. From the 14th and 15th centuries, towns, rural communities, and ecclesiastical lords enjoying Imperial immediacy pursued a similar policy, in which the confederate cantons were particularly successful: imperial privileges granted by Charles IV, Wenceslaus, and Sigismund served either to legitimize the autonomy the cantons had already attained or to enable its full development. Some regalian rights nonetheless long remained with the landgrave, as in the Buchsgau according to the customal of 9 November 1386.

In the early modern period, each sovereign canton exercised the full range of regalian rights within its territory, though their importance declined. In 1848 the regalia that remained passed in part to the new federal state, for which they became an important source of revenue in the form of monopolies (coinage and banknotes, the postal regale, customs, alcohol, and weights and measures); others remained with the cantons or were privatized (salt works, mines and minerals, hunting, fishing, and forests).

== See also ==
- Royal prerogative
- Regalia
- Khutba wa sikka, traditional marks of sovereignty in the Islamic world

== Sources ==
- Bartlett, Robert C. (2000). England Under the Norman and Angevin Kings: 1075–1225. Oxford, UK: Clarendon Press. ISBN 0-19-822741-8.
- Coredon, Christopher (2007). A Dictionary of Medieval Terms & Phrases (Reprint ed.). Woodbridge, UK: D. S. Brewer. ISBN 978-1-84384-138-8.
- Du Cange, Glossarium, s. v. Regalia
- Knowles, David (1976). The Monastic Order in England: A History of its Development from the Times of St. Dunstan to the Fourth Lateran Council, 940–1216 (Second reprint ed.). Cambridge, UK: Cambridge University Press. ISBN 0-521-05479-6.
- Pierre de Marca, De concordia sacerdotii et imperii, lib. VIII (1704)
- Felix Makower, Die Verfassung der Kirche von England (Berlin, 1894), 326 sq.
- Mason, Emma (2005). William II: Rufus, the Red King. Stroud, UK: Tempus. ISBN 0-7524-3528-0.
- George Jakob Phillips, Das Regalienrecht in Frankreich (Halle, 1873)
- Léon Mention, Documents relatifs aux rapports du clergé avec la royauté de 1682 à 1702, I (Paris, 1893) 18 sq.
- E. Michelet, Du droit de régale (thesis) (Ligugé, 1900)
- Mortimer, Richard (1994). Angevin England 1154–1258. Oxford, UK: Blackwell. ISBN 0-631-16388-3.
- Poole, Austin Lane (1955). From Domesday Book to Magna Carta, 1087–1216 (Second ed.). Oxford, UK: Clarendon Press. ISBN 0-19-821707-2.
- Ulrich Stutz, in Realencyclopädie für protestantische Theologie und Kirche, XVI (Leipzig, 1905), 536-44
- Louis Thomassin, Vetus ac nova ecclesiae disciplina circa beneficia, III, lib. II, liv
- A. Gasser, ''Entstehung und Ausbildung der Landeshoheit im Gebiete der Schweizerischen Eidgenossenschaft'', 1930
- B. Meyer, ''Die Bildung der Eidgenossenschaft im 14. Jahrhundert'', 1972
