= Henri Spondanus =

French Catholic jurist and historian

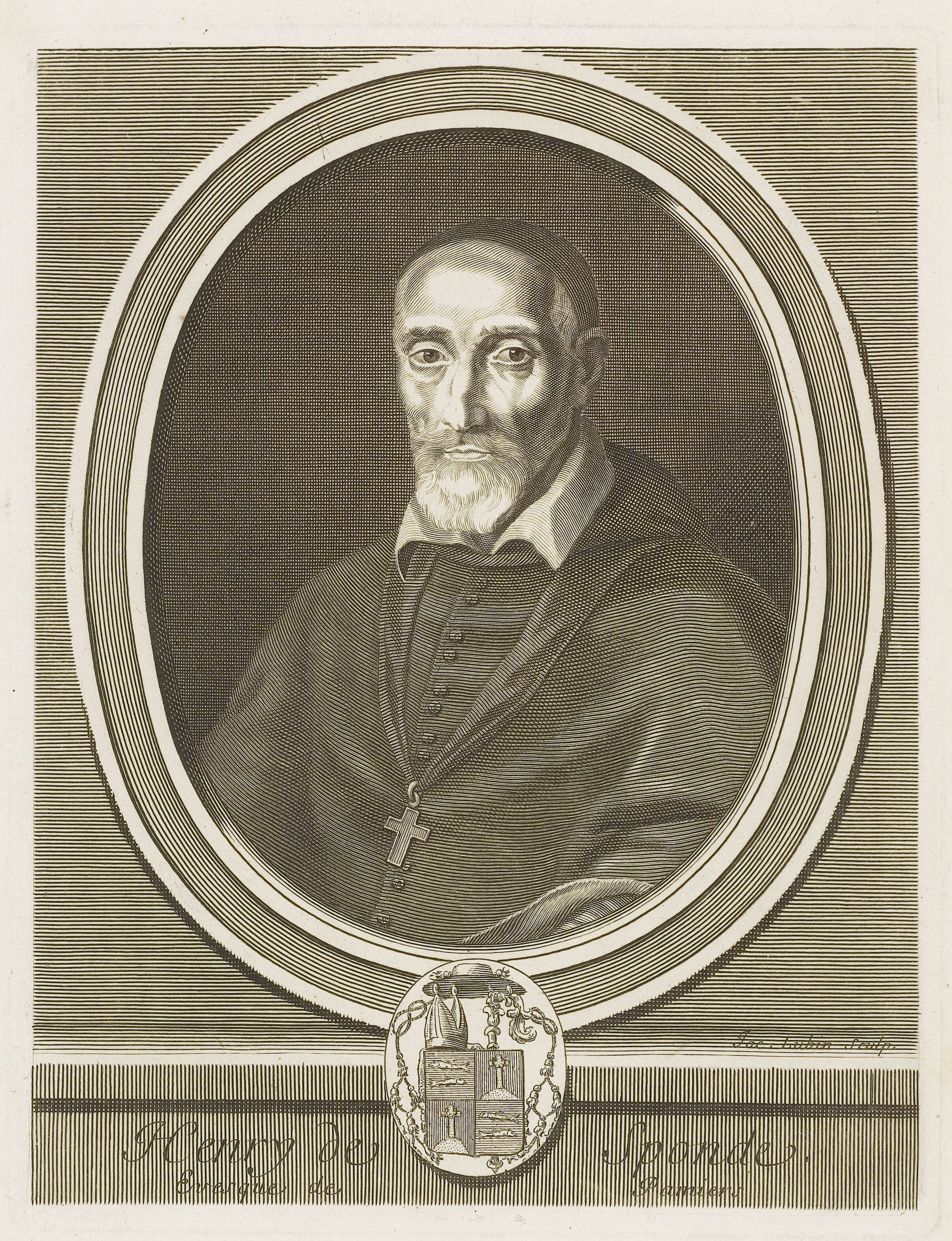
Henri de Sponde, Bishop of Pamiers (1626-1641)

Henri Spondanus (né de Sponde; 6 January 1568, Mauléon – 18 May 1643, Toulouse) was a French Catholic jurist, historian, and continuator of the Annales Ecclesiastici compiled by Cardinal Baronius, and Bishop of Pamiers. He was a convert from Calvinism.

== Biography ==
Henri de Sponde's father, Ennico (Iñigo), was a Councilor and Private Secretary of Queen Jeanne d'Albret of Navarre. Henri was born at Mauléon in Bearn on 6 January 1568. His mother was Salvia de Hosia of Bayonne, daughter of Martin de Hosia of Pamplona. At his baptism into the Calvinist church at Pau, baby Henri's godfather was Henri de Navarre, the future King of Navarre and France.

At the age of eight, he began his studies at the Calvinist college of Orthez. His elder brother Jean was studying in Geneva, and in 1584 published a Latin translation of Homer. At the same time Henri, inspired by the Psalms began to write poetry. After studying humanities, and becoming proficient in Latin and Greek, he followed his father into the service of the royal house of Navarre. In 1589 he was jurist at the Parlement of Tours, and was named a Councilor of King Henri of Navarre, King Henri IV of France. Henri accompanied the royal ambassador of Henri de Navarre, Guillaume de Salluste Du Bartas, to England and Scotland in 1597, and, upon his return, took up the study of Civil and Canon Law. It was said that he could recite the entire Institutes of the Emperor Justinian from memory.

=== Conversion ===
Persuaded by the writings of Robert Bellarmine and convinced by the instructions of Cardinal Jacques Davy Duperron, who had also instructed Henri IV, Sponde became a Catholic, officially converted by Louis Godebert, the Penitentiary of Notre Dame de Paris, on 21 August 1595. His father had already converted to Catholicism from Calvinism in 1593. In 1600 Henri was a member of the suite of Cardinal François de Sourdis who was sent to Rome as French ambassador and pilgrim in observance of the Holy Year of 1600. At Florence in December, Cardinal Duperron had the opportunity to recommend Sponde to the Cardinal Legate, Pietro Aldobrandini, the Pope's nephew, who was working to arrange a peace between Henri of France and Charles Emmanuel of Savoy in the matter of the Marquesate of Saluzzo. In Rome he became the Assessor of Cardinal Cesare Baronius, the Vatican Librarian from 1597 to 1607. He was ordained priest in Rome at the Basilica of San Marco on 7 March 1606, by Claudio Sozomen, Bishop of Pola. After his immediate return to France, he received a letter from Cardinal Baronius, dated 31 August 1606, granting him permission to publish his epitome of the Annales Ecclesiastici. He was soon back in Rome, however, assisting Cardinal Baronius in seeing what turned out to be his last volume through the press. Baronius died on 30 June 1607, and Sponde undertook to continue the work on the Annales, which had only reached the twelfth century.

==== Service in Rome ====
Pope Paul V then appointed him Corrector supplicationum in the office of the Apostolic Penitentiary. Frizon states that the appointment came after the appointment of Cardinal Scipione Caffarelli-Borghese as Major Penitentiary in 1610. Sponde was also named Rector of the French Church in Rome, San Luigi dei Francesi. As Rector, he was concerned at the apparent laxness and inattention on the part of the Chaplains appointed to the Church, and he attempted to apply a remedy. He suggested to the Archbishop of Lyon, who was the French Ambassador in Rome, that Pierre de Bérulle might supply two Oratorian priests to the church of San Luigi to help raise standards. Chancellor Sillery obtained the King's agreement, and Pope Paul gave his, while Bérulle sent two priests from Paris. The Administrators of Saint Louis and the Chaplains, however, feared the loss of their posts, raised such strong opposition that the two Oratorian priests asked to be repatriated. The affair dragged on for six years, until Pope Paul put an end to it, but in the meantime Father Sponde, realizing the difficulty of his position, resigned and returned to France.

In February 1615 Sponde is recorded as living in a house at the foot of Monte Pincio below Santissima Trinità del Monte, from which, on 26 January he visited the parishes of San Bartolommeo all'Isola, San Niccolò in Carcere, and Santa Maria in Cosmedin, trying to bring peace to warring factions.

=== Bishop ===
In 1625 he was nominated Bishop of Pamiers by King Louis XIII, and approved in Consistory by Pope Urban VIII on 20 July 1626. As a mark of his special pleasure, the Pope ordered that Sponde's bulls be granted without the payment of the usual fees. He was consecrated a bishop in Rome on 16 August 1626 by the Archbishop of Lyon, Cardinal Denis de Marquemont, who had just been created a Cardinal in January. It is said that fourteen cardinals had bid for the honor of being the principal consecrator. He labored for the preservation of Catholicism and converted numerous Protestants. In March 1628 he was credited with having successfully persuaded the leaders of Pamiers to open the gates of the city to the King, despite the intentions of the Huguenots in the city to resist to the death. On 26 May 1628, Pope Urban VIII wrote him a letter congratulating him on his return to his diocese after having been driven out by the Huguenots. In 1634 he was given his nephew, Jean de Sponde, to be his Coadjutor Bishop, with the expectation of succeeding his uncle. On 31 October 1634 Bishop Henri wrote his Last Will and Testament. In 1638 he obtained an order in council of Louis XIII, granting him 60,000 livres over a period of ten years for the reconstruction of the cathedral and the bishop's residence. Owing to ill-health, he attempted to resign his diocese in 1639, and retired to Paris; the resignation, however, was not accepted. Jean succeeded to the bishopric in 1641, and Henri left Paris and retired to Toulouse, but Jean died on 31 March 1643.

Bishop Henri de Sponde died in Toulouse on 18 May 1643. He was buried in the Cathedral of Saint-Étienne.

== Works ==
His writings are:

- Les Cimitières sacrez (in French). Bordeaux: impr. de S. Millanges. 1597.
- Annales ecclesiastici Cæsaris Baronii in Epitomen redacti (Paris, 1612)
- Annales sacri a mundi creatione ad ejusdem redemptionem (Paris, 1637), an epitome of the "Annals" of Agostino Tornielli
- Annalium Baronii continuatio ab a. 1197 quo is desinit ad a. 1622 (Paris, 1639).

== Sources ==
- Frizon, Pierre, Vita Henrici Spondani in: Sponde, Henri de Sponde (1675). Annalium ecclesiasticorum... cardinalis Caesaris Baronii continuatio, ab anno MCXCVII quo is desiit ad finem MDCXLVI (in Latin). Vol. Tomus primus. ex typographia haerededum Bartoli. pp. ix–xxxi.
- Gauchat, Patritius (Patrice) (1935). Hierarchia catholica IV (1592-1667). Münster: Libraria Regensbergiana.
- Lissene, Jacques (1643). Discours funebre de la mémoire de ... Henri de Sponde (in French). Toulouse: I. Bovde.
- Ott, Michael (1912). "Henri Spondanus". In: The Catholic Encyclopedia. New York: Robert Appleton Company. Retrieved 2017-11-22. [an inept condensation of Frizon]
- Räss, Andreas (1866). Die Convertiten seit der Reformation nach ihrem Leben und aus ihren Schriften dargestellt. 13 Bde. [with] Personen- und Sachregister [by F. Janner] (in German). Vol. Dritter Band (3). Freiburg im Breisgau: Herder. pp. 285–295. [an epitome of Frizon]
- Sainte-Marthe, Denis de (1785). Gallia christiana, in provincias ecclesiasticas distributa (in Latin). Vol. Tomus decimus-tertius (13) (second ed.). Paris: Johannes- Baptista Coignard. pp. 171–177, Instrumenta, pp. 138–139.
- Vidal, Jean-Marie (1929). Henri de Sponde, recteur de Saint-Louis-des-Français, évêque de Pamiers, 1568-1643 (in French). Rome: Établissements français. [= Histoire des évêques de Pamiers, 4]
