= Ascaric (name) =

Ascaric, Ascarich or Anscharic (Spanish: Ascario or Ascarico, French: Anschéric, Portuguese: Ascárico) is a Germanic name that appears in Latin sources as Asacarius, Assacarius, Assaccarius, Ascaricus or Askericus. It is a compound name derived from Proto-Germanic asca-, "ash," probably species of Fraxinus, meaning also "spear," and Proto-Germanic -ric < Celtic *rig-, meaning "ruler." Asca- may allude to the spear of *Wodanaz, a symbol of his inspirational power, or the name of the first man in the Germanic creation myth. -Ric was a common name suffix among early Germanic and Celtic men of status. Ascaric was used mainly by the Franks and Visigoths. It can refer to:

- Ascaric (died 306), Frankish war leader of the Bructeri executed by Constantine I
- Ascaric (bishop of Palencia) (fl. 653)
- Ascaric (archbishop of Braga) (died 810)
- Askericus (died c. 890), Frankish bishop
