= Marcel Germain Perrier =

French Roman Catholic bishop

- Bishop of Pamiers
- Church: Catholic Church
- Diocese: Diocese of Pamiers
- In office: 16 May 2000 – 24 June 2008
- Predecessor: Albert-Marie de Monléon
- Successor: Philippe Mousset
- Previous posts: Titular Bishop of Diana (1988-2000); Auxiliary Bishop of Chambéry–Saint-Jean-de-Maurienne–Tarentaise (1988-2000)

Orders
- Ordination: 29 June 1957
- Consecration: 17 July 1988 by Claude Feidt

Personal details
- Born: 28 June 1933 La Dray, Arêches, Beaufort, Savoie, France
- Died: 2 October 2017 (aged 84) Moûtiers, Auvergne-Rhône-Alpes, France

Marcel Germain Perrier (French pronunciation: [maʁsɛl ʒɛʁmɛ̃ pɛʁje]; 28 June 1933 – 2 October 2017) was a Roman Catholic bishop.

Perrier was ordained to the priesthood in 1958. He was named auxiliary bishop of the Roman Catholic Archdiocese of Chambéry-Saint-Jean-Maurienne–Tarentaise, France in 1988. He then served as bishop of the Roman Catholic Diocese of Pamiers from 2000 until 2008. He retired on 24 June 2008, and died on 2 October 2017 at the age of 84.

== See also ==
- Catholic Church in France
