= Ausculta Fili =

1301 papal bull to the King of France

Ausculta Fili (Latin, lit. 'Give ear, my son') is a papal bull addressed on 5 December 1301, by Pope Boniface VIII to King Philip IV of France.

== Background ==
Philip, at enmity with Boniface, had aggressively expanded what he saw as royal rights by conferring benefices and appointing bishops to sees, regardless of papal authority. He drove from their sees bishops who were in opposition to his will and supported the Pope.

On 23 July 1295, Boniface created a see at Pamiers from the diocese of Toulouse by the bull Romanus Pontifex, made it a suffragan of the archdiocese of Narbonne and named Bernard Saisset as bishop. However, the opposition of Hughes Mascaron, Bishop of Toulouse, and the conflict between Saisset and Roger Bernard III, Count of Foix, prevented Saisset from taking immediate possession of his diocese. As an ardent Occitan aristocrat, Saisset made no secret of the fact that he despised the northern "Frankish" French.

In 1299, Boniface suspended two bishops in the south of France. Philip then attempted to exercise the droit de regale and claimed the right to seize the revenues of the vacant sees. Boniface objected that suspension is not the same as deposition and did not render a see vacant. He sent the Bishop of Pamiers to Philip as legate to protest.

== Contents ==
The incipit is modeled on that of the Rule of St Benedict. The letter is couched in firm, paternal terms. It points out the alleged evils the king has brought to his kingdom, to church and to State and invites him to do penance and mend his ways.

== Aftermath ==
It went unheeded by Philip and was followed by the papal bull Unam Sanctam.

== Sources ==
- Giles of Rome (2004). Dyson, R. W. (ed.). Giles of Rome's On Ecclesiastical Power: A Medieval Theory of World Government : a Critical Edition and Translation. Translated by Dyson, R.W. Columbia University Press. ISBN 9780231128032.
- Anderson, C. Colt (2007). The Great Catholic Reformers: From Gregory the Great to Dorothy Day. Paulist Press. ISBN 9780809105793.
- Wolffe, Philippe, ed. (1983). "Malheurs et fastes de l'automne du Moyen Age". Le Diocèse de Toulouse (in French). Beauchesne. ISBN 9782701010571.

Attribution
