= Hôtel de Ville, Saint-Antonin-Noble-Val =

Town hall in Saint-Antonin-Noble-Val, France

Hôtel de Ville
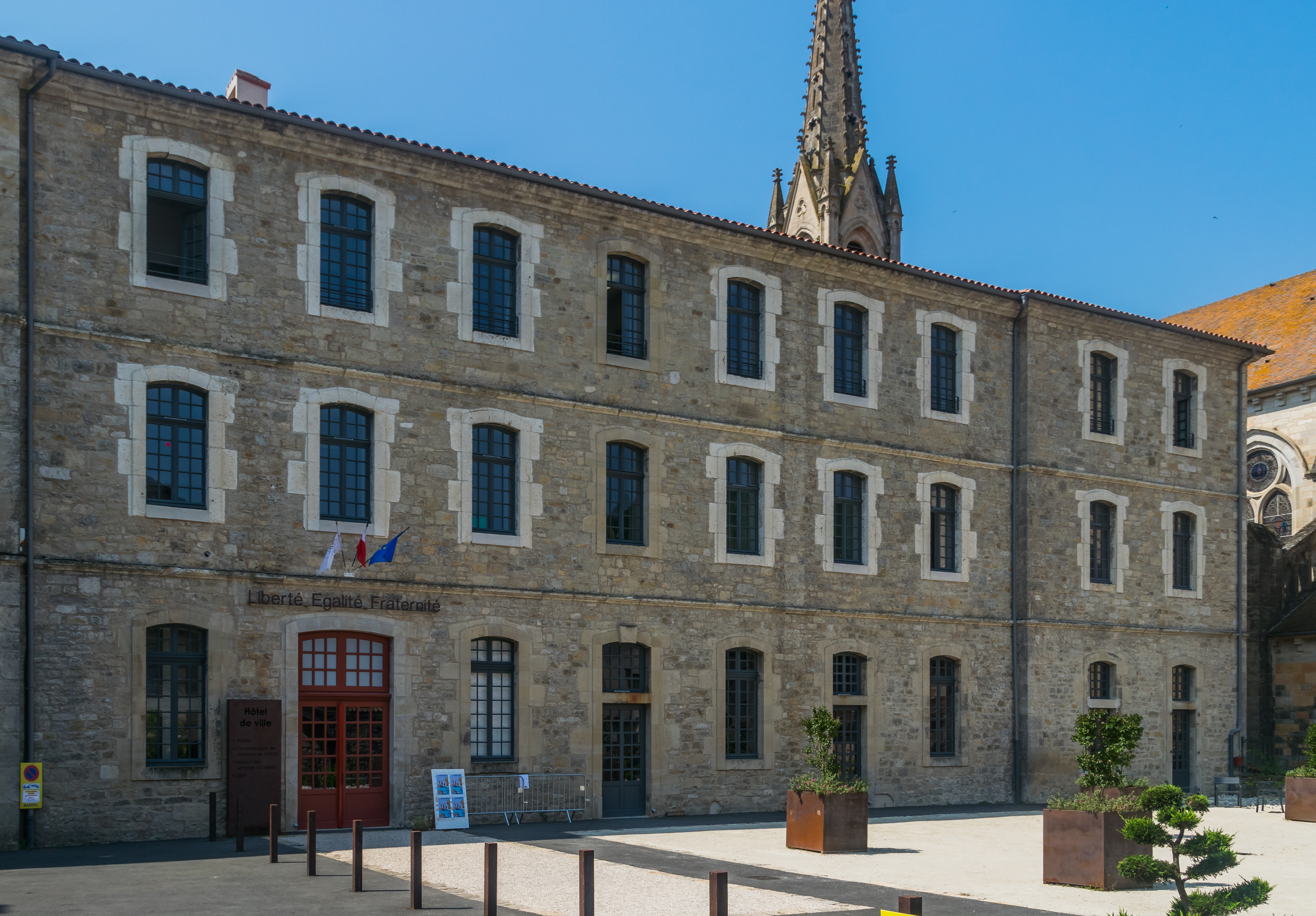
- The north elevation of the Hôtel de Ville in June 2017
- Interactive map of the Hôtel de Ville area

General information
- Type: City hall
- Architectural style: Neoclassical style
- Location: Saint-Antonin-Noble-Val, France
- Coordinates: 44.1510°N 1.7561°E
- Completed: 1752

Design and construction
- Architect: Jean-Baptiste Arnaud

The Hôtel de Ville (French pronunciation: [otɛl də vil], City Hall) is a municipal building in Saint-Antonin-Noble-Val, Tarn-et-Garonne, southern France, standing on Place François Pomiès. It has been included on the Inventaire général des monuments by the French Ministry of Culture since 1989.

== History ==
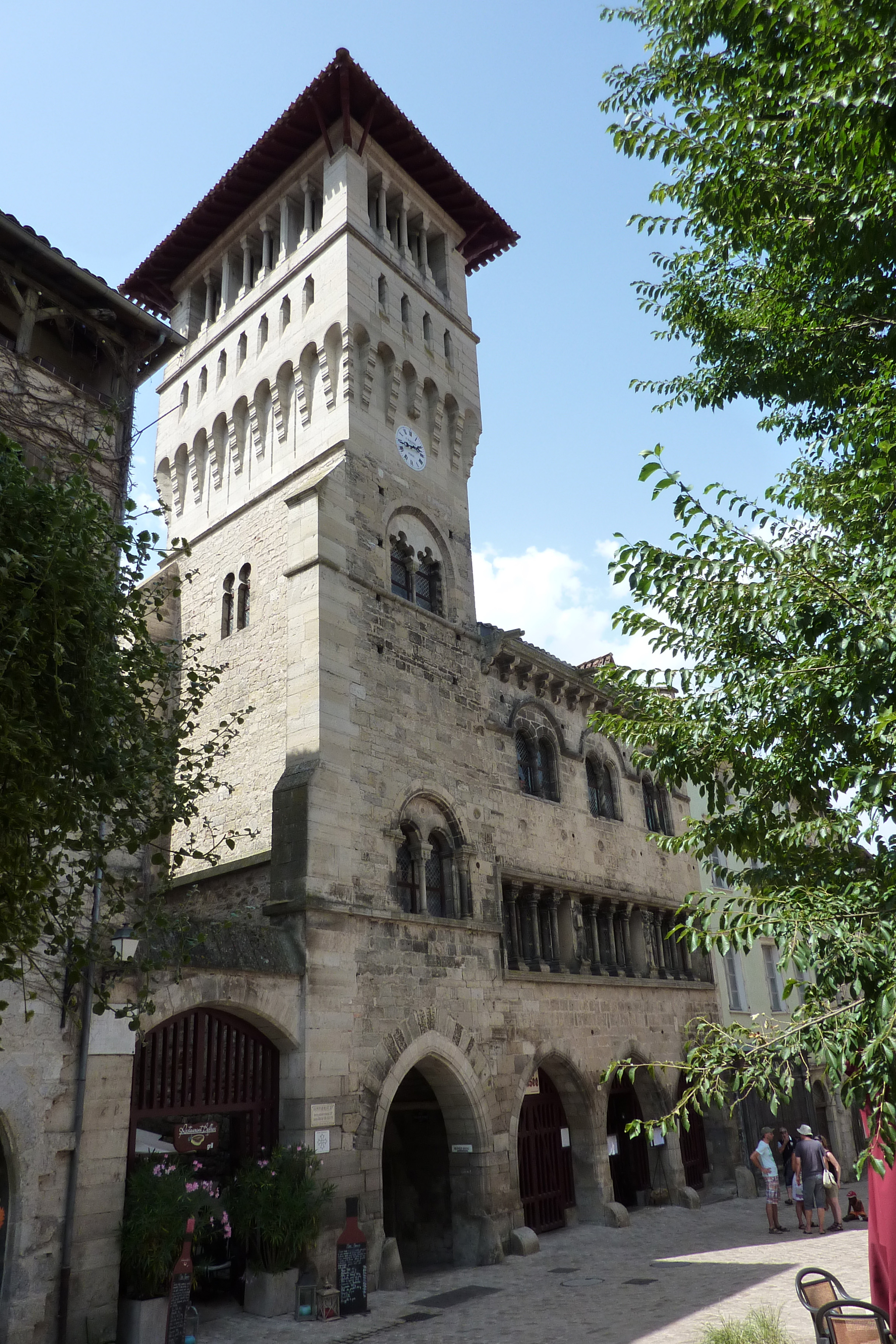
The Maison des Consuls

The first town hall in Saint-Antonin-Noble-Val was the Maison des Consuls which was commissioned by the Viscount of Saint-Antonin, Archambaud, in 1125. The design involved an asymmetrical main frontage of four bays facing onto Place de la Halle. The layout involved a tower to the left and the main block to the right. On the ground floor there was a loggia with four arches. On the first floor of the main block, there was an opening containing three small columns, then a statue of the emperor Justinian I holding a book of laws, then another three small columns, then statues of Adam and Eve under the tree of knowledge, and finally another three small columns. On the second floor, there were three pairs of rounded headed windows separated by colonnettes.

The building became the meeting place of the consuls in 1312. After the French Revolution it was no longer used for administration of the town. It was restored by Eugène Viollet-le-Duc in the mid-19th century: assisted by Théodore Olivier, he made significant additions to the tower in the style of the Palazzo Vecchio in Florence. The Société des Amis du Vieux Saint-Antonin established a small museum in the building in 1936.

The current town hall was commissioned as the Couvent des Génovéfains (the Convent of the Génovéfains) in the mid-18th century. Construction started in 1747: it was designed by Jean-Baptiste Arnaud in the neoclassical style, built in rubble masonry and was completed in 1752. The design of the south elevation involved a symmetrical main frontage of seven bays facing onto what is now Place de la Mairie, with wings on either side projected forward. There was a forestair leading up to a round headed doorway, and a French door with a balcony on the first floor. Inside, a staircase with iron railings led up to the main rooms on the upper floors.

Following the French Revolution, the convent was seized by the state and the friars were driven out. The town council took control of the building shortly thereafter and subsequently maintained it as its offices and meeting place. An entrance for public access was subsequently established on the north side. The design of the north elevation involved a symmetrical main frontage of 11 bays facing onto what is now Place François Pomiès, with the last two bays on either side slightly projected forward. The Place François Pomiès was also maintained as a space for public ceremonies.
