= François-Barthélemy de Salignac-Fénelon =

French bishop

François-Barthélemy de Salignac-Fénelon (born 1691 in Sainte-Mondane) was a French clergyman and bishop for the Roman Catholic Diocese of Pamiers. He was ordained in 1717. He was appointed bishop in 1735. He died in 1741.
