= Pamiers Cathedral =

Cathedral located in Ariège, in France

Coordinates: 43°6′51″N 1°36′32″E

Pamiers Cathedral Cathédrale Saint-Antonin de Pamiers
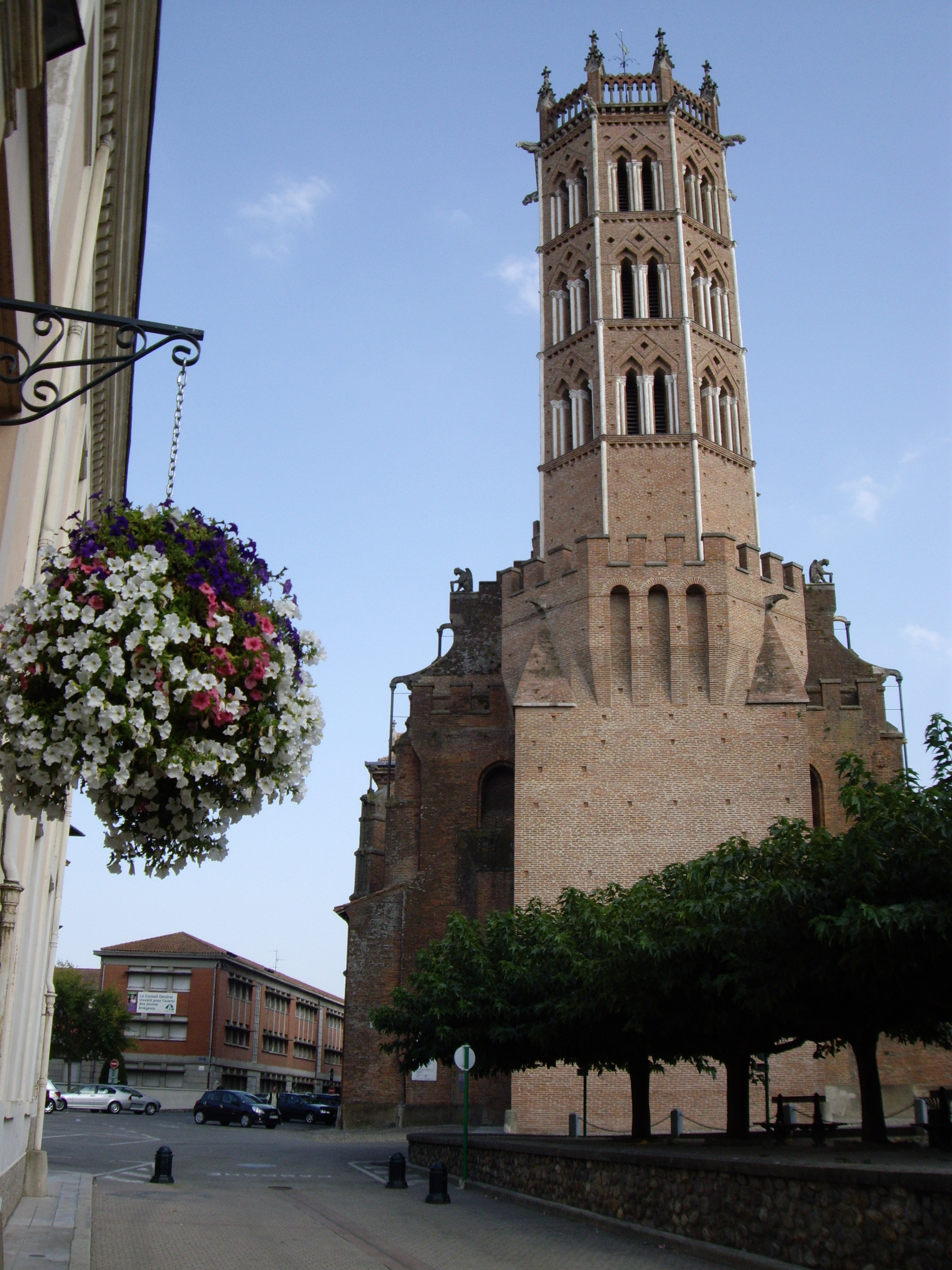
- Pamiers Cathedral

Religion
- Affiliation: Roman Catholic Church
- Province: Bishopric of Pamiers
- Region: Ariège
- Rite: Roman
- Ecclesiastical or organisational status: Cathedral
- Status: Active

Location
- Location: Pamiers, France
- Interactive map of Pamiers Cathedral; Cathédrale Saint-Antonin de Pamiers

Architecture
- Type: church
- Style: Southern French Gothic
- Groundbreaking: 12th century
- Completed: 17th century

Pamiers Cathedral (French: Cathédrale Saint-Antonin de Pamiers) is a Roman Catholic church located in the town of Pamiers, France. The cathedral is a national monument. It is the ecclesiastical seat of the Bishopric of Pamiers, which was established in 1275, abolished by the Concordat of 1801, and re-established in 1822. It is in the Southern French Gothic architectural tradition, and is dedicated to Antoninus of Pamiers.

== Architecture ==
The building is made of Toulouse brick, a common material in the region.

Of the original church, dating back to the 12th century, only part of the portal survives. The Wars of Religion during the 16th century caused great damage in the city, leaving only the bell tower, which could be used as a watchtower.

The nave renovation was not completed until 1689. Most of the reconstruction work was done by François Mansart. Others also attribute it to his nephew, Jules Hardouin-Mansart, who was known to work under the guidance of his uncle.

The cathedral has a single nave, the chapels being inserted between the buttresses.

== Sources ==
- Catholic Hierarchy: Diocese of Pamiers
- Pamiers Cathedral at Structurae
- Pamiers Cathedral at The Planet's Cathedrals
