= Antoninus of Pamiers =

Early Christian missionary and martyr

Saint Antoninus of Pamiers
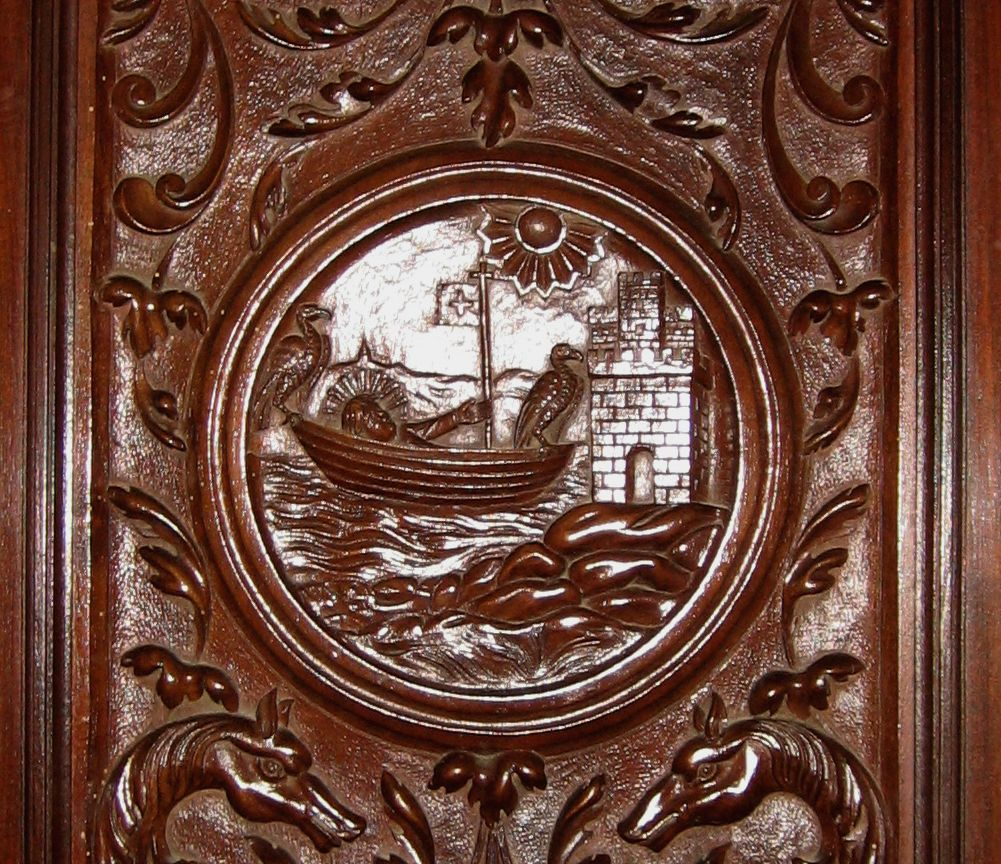
- Carving in Pamiers Cathedral depicting the voyage of Antoninus' relics.
- Born: Fredelacum (Pamiers)
- Died: ? Vallis Nobilis, now Saint-Antonin-Noble-Val
- Venerated in: Catholic Church, Eastern Orthodox Church
- Feast: 2 September
- Patronage: Pamiers; Palencia; Medina del Campo

Saint Antoninus of Pamiers (French: Saint Antonin, Occitan: Sant Antoní, and Spanish: San Antolín) was an early Christian missionary and martyr, called the "Apostle of the Rouergue". His life is dated to the first, second, fourth, and fifth century by various sources since he is often confused with various other venerated Antonini. Today he is revered as the patron saint of Pamiers, Palencia, and Medina del Campo. His historicity and exact identity are in doubt.

== History ==
Reportedly born at Fredelacum (Pamiers), Antoninus converted to Christianity and made a pilgrimage to Rome, where he was ordained. He returned to preach the Gospel in Aquitaine, especially in the border regions of the Rouergue. The traditions of the Diocese of Pamiers mention as its first Apostle of Christianity. Cardinal Caesar Baronius believed that he was one of the martyrs of the Theban Legion in 286.

He is credited with performing many miracles. He was martyred at Vallis Nobilis, now Saint-Antonin-Noble-Val on 2 September, his feast day. His relics ended up at Pamiers and Palencia.

== Veneration ==
Antoninus was venerated from an early date. Palencia Cathedral is dedicated to him, as is Pamiers Cathedral.

According to local tradition, the Crypt of Saint Antoninus at Palencia Cathedral, which supposedly houses his relics, was finished during the mid-seventh century episcopate of Ascaric. A monastery dedicated to him had been built near Foix by the eighth century. It claimed to possess his head and part of his body, brought from Syria by a boat that had navigated the rivers Ariège, Tarn, Garonne, and Aveyron with the aid of an angel. These conflicting traditions suggest that the martyr of Pamiers is the same person as the martyr Antoninus of Syria.

The Abbey of St. Antonin was founded near Fredelacum about 960.

The town of Saint-Antonin-Noble-Val is named after him.

== Gallery ==
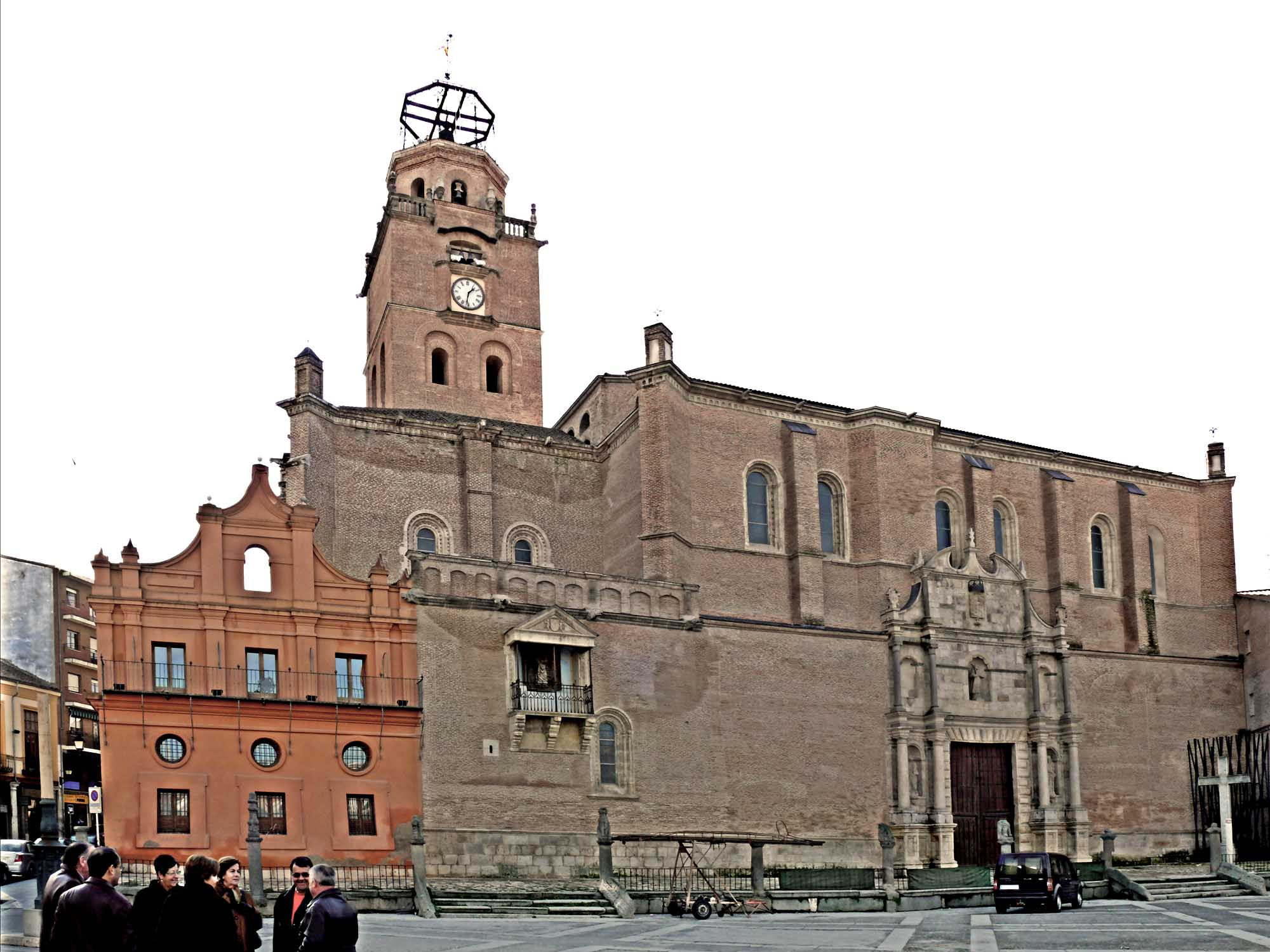
Collegiate church of San Antolín, Medina del Campo, attributed to Juan Gil de Hontañon.

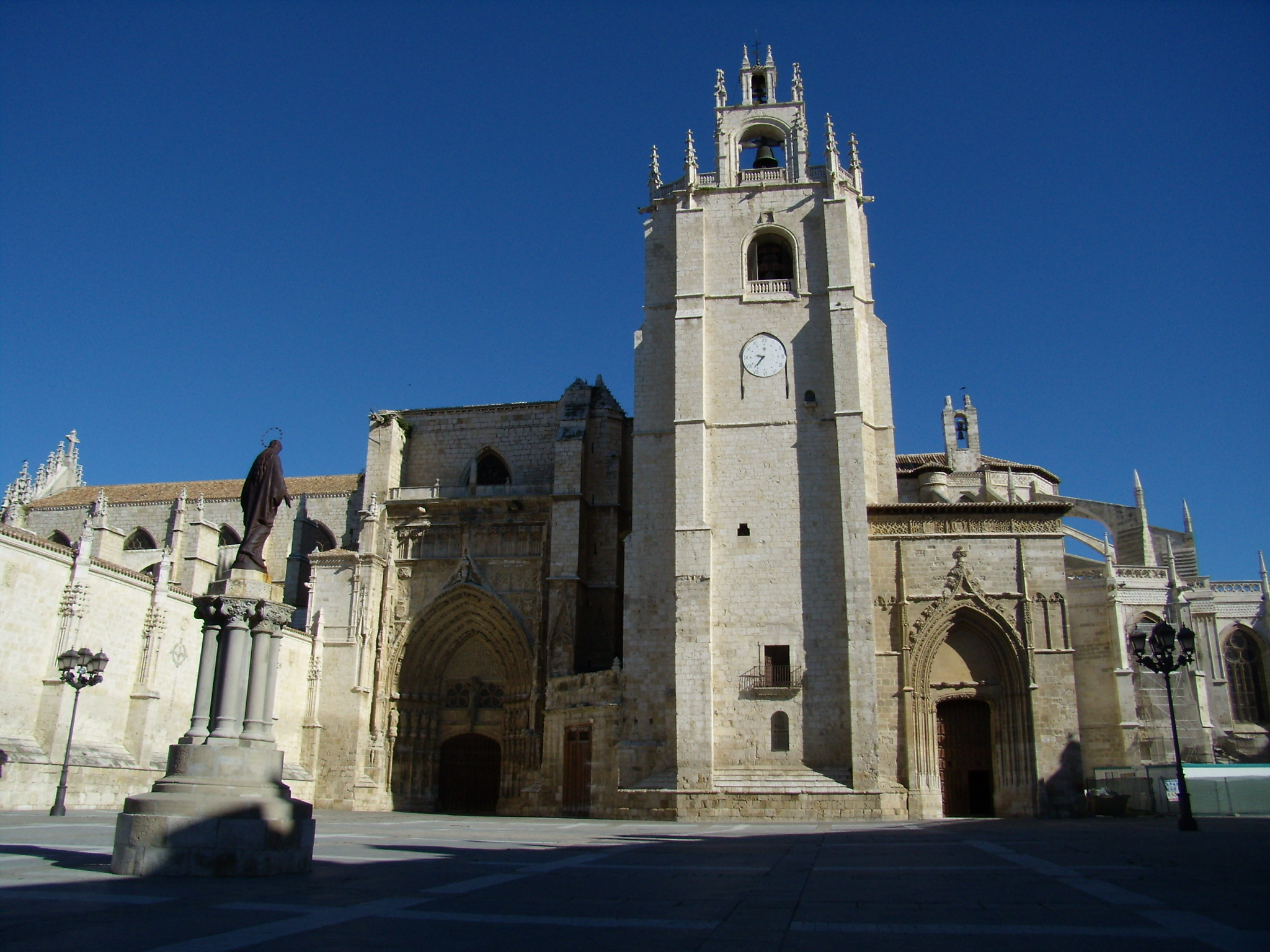
Catedral de San Antolín en Palencia.

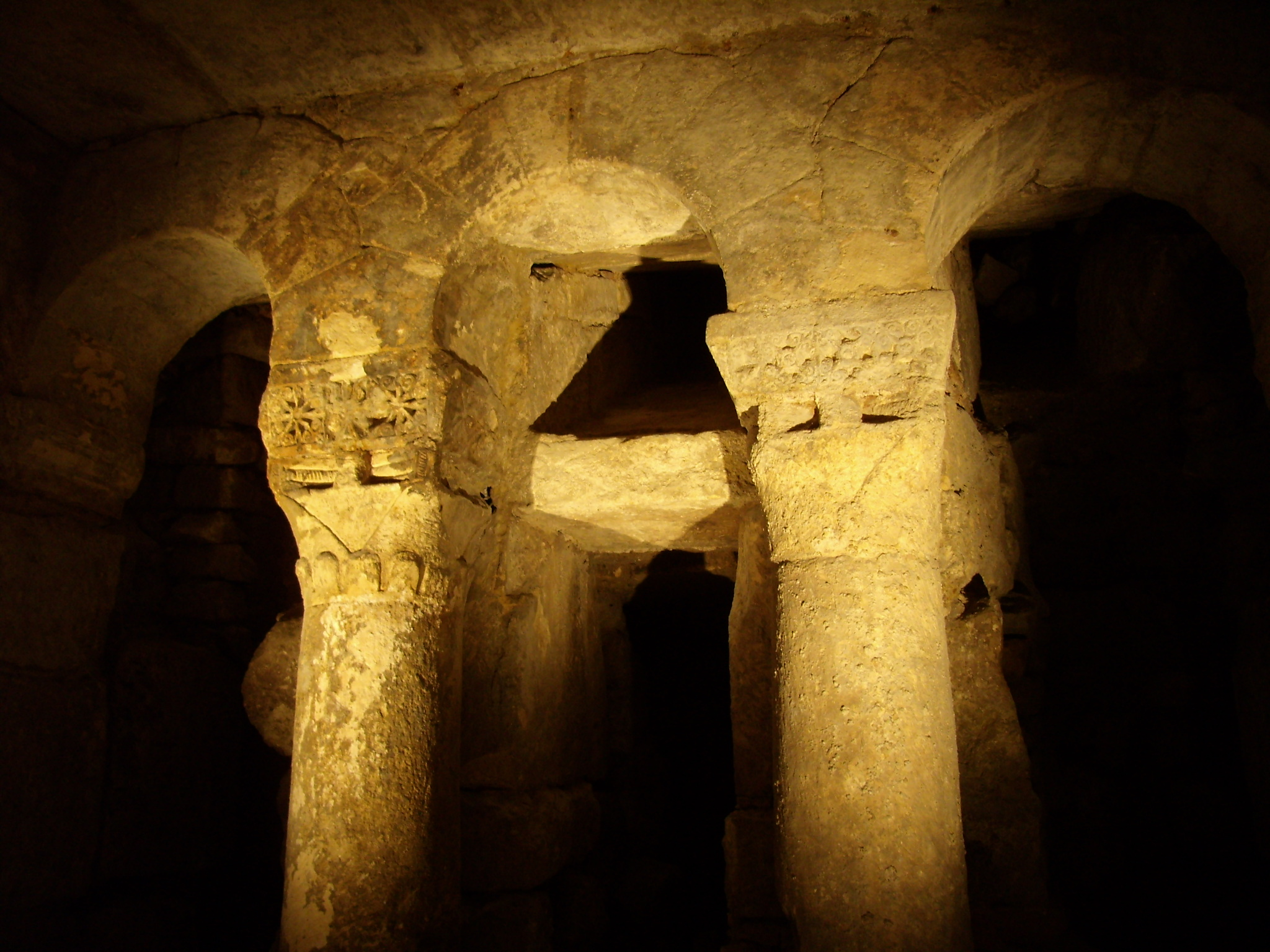
Cripta de San Antolín, Palencia Cathedral.

== Sources ==
- Butler, Alban and Burns, Paul (2000). Butler's Lives of the Saints: September. Liturgical Press. ISBN 0-8146-2385-9.
- Englebert, Omer (1994). The Lives of the Saints. Barnes and Noble Publishing. ISBN 1-56619-516-0.
- Saint Antoninus of Pamiers at New Catholic Dictionary
