= François de Camps =

French numismatist

François de Camps (1643–1723), who was made abbé of Signy after Pope Alexander VIII refused to consent to his nomination as bishop of Pamiers, was an antiquarian of Amiens whose dissertations on medals were published in the Mercure de France of 1719–1723.
