= Charles Constance César Joseph Matthieu d'Agoult =

French bishop (1747/1749–1824)

Charles Constance César Joseph Matthieu d'Agoult de Bonneval (1747/1749, Grenoble – 1824, Paris), also known as Charles-César-Louis Loup Constance Joseph Mathieu d’Agoult de Bonneval, was a French Roman Catholic bishop, and after his resignation of his diocese a political writer.

His eldest brother, François-Edouard-Augustin-Venceslas-Hippolyte, Marquis d'Agoult, was Maréchal-de-Camp in the royal army. Another brother, Antoine-Jean, Vicomte d'Agoult, held the rank of Mestre-de-camp, and was a Commander in the Order of Saint Lazare. Another brother, Louis-Annibale, was also a Maréchal-de-Camp.

== Career ==
Agoult studied at the Seminary of St. Sulpice at Paris. He was Vicar-General of the diocese of Soissons, and then Vicar-General of Cardinal de Rouchefoucauld at Rouen. He was named Bishop of Pamiers by King Louis XVI of France on 28 January 1787, and received approval from Pope Pius VI on 23 April 1787. He was consecrated a bishop on 13 May 1787.

In 1789 Agoult sought election to the Estates General, but he was refused by his own clergy on 4 April. He left Pamiers.

During the French Revolution he helped prepare the abortive escape train for Louis XVI at Vincennes, but then emigrated, and settled in Coblentz in the faction of the Comte d'Artois. It is said that he had been a lover of Mme. de Matignon, and that he intrigued to be Garde de Scaux or Chancellor in a future royal administration. But he returned to France in 1801, having resigned his bishopric as required by Pope Pius VII, though only after some attempt at negotiating better terms.

== Works ==
- Conversation avec E. Burke, sur l'interêt des puissances de l'Europe (Paris, 1814)
- Projet d'une banque nationale (Paris, 1815)
- Lettre à un Jacobin, ou réflexions politiques sur la constitution d'Angleterre et la charte royale (Paris, 1815)
- Eclaircissement sur le projet d'une banque nationale (Paris, 1816)

== Bibliography ==
- Jean, Armand (1891). Les évêques et les archevêques de France depuis 1682 jusqu'à 1801 (in French). Paris: A. Picard. p. 389.
- Ritzler, Remigius; Sefrin, Pirminus (1958). Hierarchia catholica medii et recentis aevi VI (1730-1799). Patavii: Messagero di S. Antonio. p. 91, with note 4.
