= Saint-Antonin-Noble-Val =

- Commune
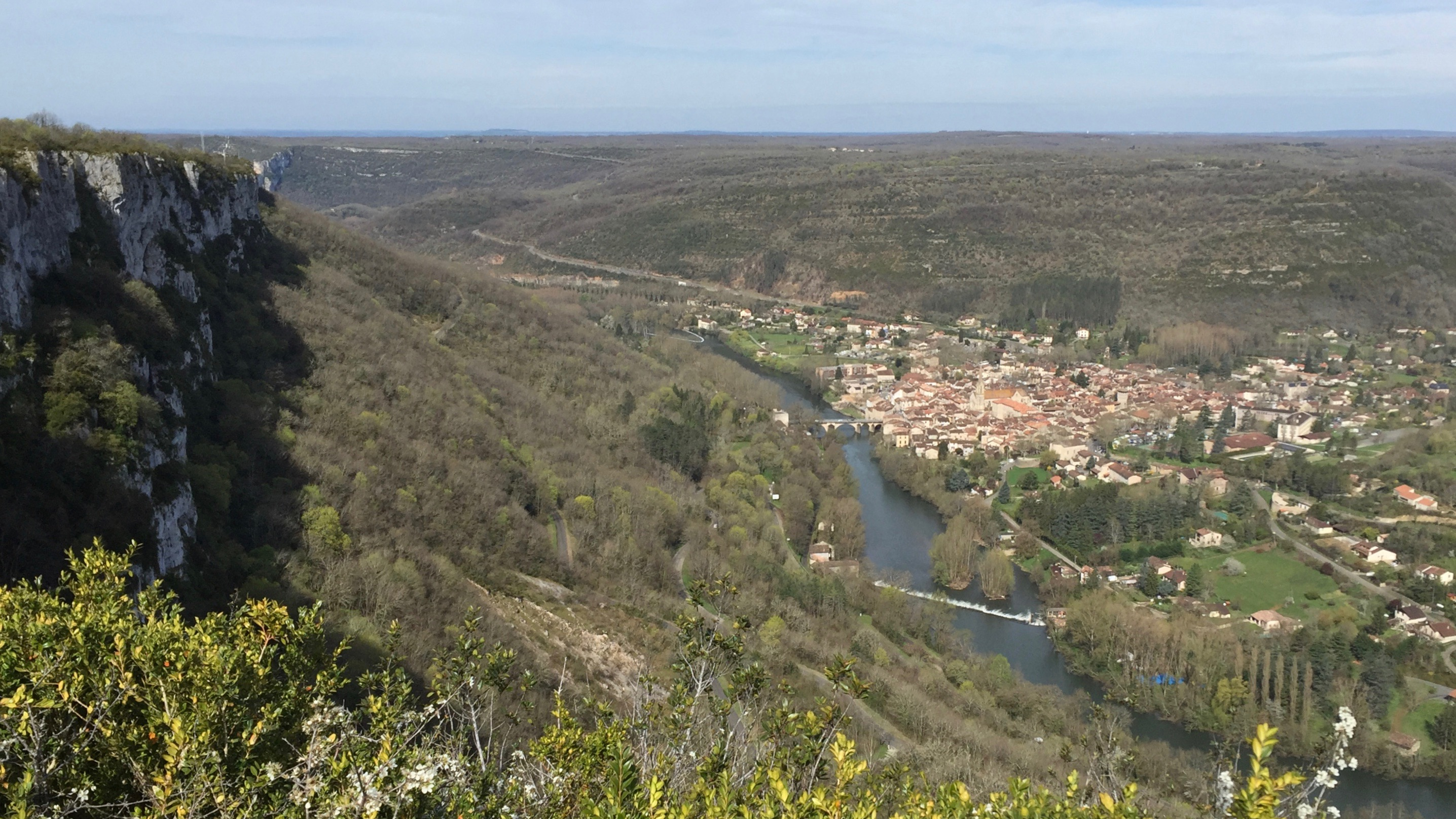
- View of the town from Roc d'Anglars

- Coat of arms
- Location of Saint-Antonin-Noble-Val
- Location within France Location within Occitanie
- Coordinates: 44°09′10″N 1°45′21″E
- Country: France
- Region: Occitania
- Department: Tarn-et-Garonne
- Arrondissement: Montauban
- Canton: Quercy-Rouergue

Government
  - Mayor (2023–2026): Elisabeth Birs
- Area^{1}: 106.12 km^{2} (40.97 sq mi)
- Elevation: 300 m (980 ft)
- Highest elevation: 395 m (1,296 ft)
- Lowest elevation: 110 m (360 ft)
- Population (2023): 1,949
  - Density: 18.37/km^{2} (47.57/sq mi)
- Time zone: UTC+01:00 (CET)
  - Summer (DST): UTC+02:00 (CEST)
- INSEE/Postal code: 82155 /82140
- Website: www.st-antoninnv.com
- ^{1} French Land Register data, which excludes lakes, ponds, glaciers > 1 km^{2} (0.386 sq mi or 247 acres) and river estuaries.

Saint-Antonin-Noble-Val (French pronunciation: [sɛ̃.t‿ɑ̃tɔnɛ̃ nɔbl val]; Occitan: Sent Antonin, before 1962: Saint-Antonin) is a commune in the Tarn-et-Garonne department in the Occitanie region in southern France.

Having played an influential and somewhat bellicose role in the history of the region from the 12th to the 17th centuries, it then declined economically and as a result has preserved largely the medieval core which has many listed buildings and is now a major tourist attraction. Its Sunday market is extensive and draws visitors and locals alike. It is a member of the Cittaslow movement.

== Geography ==
Saint-Antonin-Noble-Val is situated in the gorge of the Aveyron river at the confluence of the Bonnette, overlooked by the limestone cliffs of the Roc d'Anglars. It is located at the edge of Rouergue where the Albigeois lands border with Quercy, to the north of the forest of Grésigne. It lies on one of the ancient pilgrim routes to Santiago de Compostela.

== History ==
The area has been occupied for over 10,000 years, as evidenced by the archaeological discoveries at the nearby Upper Palaeolithic (Magdalenian) site of Fontalès.

The town is named after Antoninus of Pamiers, who brought Christianity to the Rouergue. He was martyred c. 305 when, following this success, he then tried to convert Pamiers, his home town in the Pyrenees. His remains were believed to have been interred on the site of the town, an abbey was founded in the 8th century (Note: Pepin the Short, King of the Franks, is recorded as having endowed the abbey following his suppression of Aquitaine in 767. The monasterium sancti Antonii is listed in the Notitia de servitio monasteriorum published in 819 following the councils of Aachen) by Festus, the local ruler of what was then known as Vallis Nobilis. (Note: Louis IX mentions Saint-Antonin "in valle nobili" in a charter dated 1226.)

The abbey was expanded by the Benedictines in the 11th century, and it was finished around 1150. By the end of the 12th century it passed into the control of Augustinian Canons Regular. (Note: The first chapter was composed of a provost and eighteen secular canons; but Pope Urban II made it a regular chapter in 1090, and reduced it to twelve regular canons, to which he added twelve secular prebendaries. Several popes granted privileges to this church, among others Eugene IV, who awarded it tithes of saffron in 1444.) The monastery was destroyed in 1570 during the wars of religion when the church was burned down, the exercise of the Catholic religion was outlawed, and the city became one of the strongholds of the reformists. Today there are only a few surviving fragments, but corbels possibly from the former abbey's collegiate church adorn several buildings. (Note: For an exposition of the town's corbels see)

Saint-Antonin had one of the first hospitals in the region, founded by the 8th century. Reformists also burned down that building in 1575.

From the 9th century, Saint-Antonin was ruled by one of the first nobles in the area to hold the title of viscount. They were powerful lords of Rouergue, but vassals of the count of Toulouse. The last independent viscount ceded all his rights to the King of France in 1249.

Saint-Antonin reputably has the oldest town hall in France. The first recorded mention of the "New House" - which served as a lordly residence and court house - dates from 1155. In 1212 it was bought by the consuls (town councillors) and referred to as La Maio del Cossolat. The consuls had vacated it by 1791 and it now houses a local museum.

The former castle of Vallette (castrum vallatum) was built in 1180 by Fortuné de Valletta, son of viscount Archambauld, who died in the Holy Land in 1190. This castle was located on top of a steep cliff overlooking the Aveyron, its ruins were still visible in the nineteenth century, when it was also known as the Château de Bône. (The Vallette family gave their name to the Maltese capital Valletta, which was founded by the Grand Master of the Order of Malta, Jean Parisot de Valette.)

The Canal du Bessarel was constructed in the 13th century to service a water-mill and other industries such as the tannery, whose site remains.

=== The Albigensian Crusade ===
In 1209, the viscounts of Saint-Antonin embraced Catharism. Pope Innocent III authorised a crusade against the Cathars, and the bishop of Puy placed Saint-Antonin under siege. The inhabitants resisted for some time, but were finally forced to capitulate and pay a considerable ransom. The Cathars took control again a short time later, but in 1211 Simon de Montfort seized it again. A little later, Sant-Antonin and nearby Guépie sought the protection of the count of Toulouse, sponsor of the Albigeois, who installed Adhemar de Jourdain as governor. Montfort, indignant at these frequent infidelities, marched to Saint-Antonin from Albi, determined to retake it permanently. The bishop of Albi, who led the vanguard of the army, arrived before him and urged the inhabitants to submit. Montfort set up camp outside the town and was attacked that evening by the inhabitants. The sergeants of his army repelled them and attacked the town, without the participation of their generals. After an hour's fighting, they had taken three small outer towers. The inhabitants started to flee through a gate opposite the camp. The crusaders pursued them and helped themselves to everything they came across. At midnight, viscount Pons, judging that the town would inevitably be taken the next day, sent Montfort a conditional offer to surrender, which was refused. The crusaders entered the town early next morning and sacked the place. Pons, the governor and several other knights were taken to Carcassonne, and locked in a tiny cell.

Louis VIII resolved to march in person against the Cathars in 1226, and sent Hebrard, a knight templar, to take possession of the town on his behalf and receive the oath of allegiance of the inhabitants. The oath was sworn by the twelve consuls, the prior and all residents over fifteen years old. After taking the oath, they begged Sir Hébrard not to tell anyone, lest the count of Toulouse find out before the arrival of the King and come to ravage their lands. They also asked him to intercede for them with the cardinal legate, who accompanied the King, to remove the interdict over the town. The King, the following January, sent letters of guarantee to Paris confirming the town's customs and privileges. (Note: These dated from 1136 and, amongst other customs, fixed the number of consuls at twelve, abolished certain taxes, gave unrestricted rights to visitors who came to the feast of St. Antonin each year in November, and allowed an accused man to be tried by combat, or by ordeal (in this case, red-hot iron).)

In 1229, when Louis IX made peace with Raymond VII of Toulouse, he wrote to the various lords of Rouergue, who had sworn fealty to his father, and ordained them to take an oath of loyalty to "his dearest cousin and vassal Raimond, count of Toulouse", thus ending the conflict.

=== The Hundred Years' War ===
During the Hundred Years' War the Plantagenets first seized Saint-Antonin in about 1345, but the count of Armagnac, governor of the Languedoc drove them out. In 1352, the Plantagenets took the town again, and from here ravaged the area of Toulouse.

Armagnac undertook the reconquest of Saint-Antonin, but his enemy the Count of Foix made raids into the lands of Armagnac and forced him to give up for a time. He resumed the siege in the following February, and as it dragged on he entrusted it to Arnaud de Pressac, marshal of his forces, so that he could travel to Najac where he had summoned the representatives of the towns in the Languedoc to raise funds. The steward of Carcassonne pledged ten sous per hearth, which was worth 72,000 livres, Beaucaire also provided 24,000 deniers d'or à l'écu, and the town of Nîmes gave 400 gold crowns, provided that the number of its consuls could be increased to six.

These funds, combined with those of the stewards of Rouergue and Quercy who also contributed, formed a much larger sum than was necessary for this enterprise. Armagnac immediately positioned himself before Saint-Antonin, resolved to make every effort to drive out the English. He ignored a six-month truce agreed between France and England with effect from 1 March 1353. But all his efforts, and the funds he had raised in the lands under his control, became useless, because of the peace negotiated between the two courts, and the English remained masters of Saint-Antonin for the next several years.

In 1382, Toulouse and several other towns, including Saint-Antonin, revolted against the duke of Berri, the King's commander in Languedoc. Immediately the capitouls of Toulouse sent Saint-Antonin an armed garrison under the pretext of defending them against the English, who still occupied nearby Laguépie. The King's troops laid siege to the town once again; but in 1388, they paid 240 francs in gold to avoid punishment for joining with the rebel communities.

=== The French Wars of Religion ===
When religious fanaticism rekindled in Rouergue in the 16th century, as a result of the new doctrines of Luther and Calvin, Saint-Antonin was one of the first to declare for the Protestants, and it quickly became one of their main bastions. It was at the center of their meetings, of their deputations to the King, and of their leadership. If an expedition were to be undertaken against Catholics in the neighbourhood, it was the Protestants of Saint-Antonin who directed and executed the enterprise.

When 70 or so Protestants of nearby Gaillac assembled in 1561 for the Lord's Supper, the inhabitants of the district of Orme, backed by a company of regular troops, took them prisoner. They took them to the terraces of Saint-Michel Abbey, above the banks of the Tarn, where a labourer named Cabrol, dressed in the cloak and hat of a local judge and assisted by a lawyer named Pousson, condemned them to be thrown down from the terrace into the river, telling them to eat fish since they had not fasted during Lent. Boatmen in the river battered to death those who were able to swim. In the meantime, the remaining Protestants in the town were massacred. In 1568 Protestants from Saint-Antonin resolved to take revenge. They gathered their brothers from Millau and Montauban, and seized Gaillac, looting and killing indiscriminately, and setting fire to the neighbourhood where Catholics were taking refuge. Cabrol was taken to the rocky terrace of the abbey and thrown into the river and they hanged Pousson. This is just an example of the excesses that were committed in these times of fanaticism, during which Saint-Antonin felt the effects more than once.

The collegiate church was destroyed sometime after 1614, and Saint-Antonin was again besieged in 1621 by Louis XIII in person. He was camped outside Montauban, which was controlled by Protestants, when he learned that Saint-Antonin was sending 1,200 men to rescue the town. He arrived at Saint-Antonin on 13 June and forced it to surrender. Twelve inhabitants were put to death, all the fortifications and walls were destroyed, and the town was ordered to pay a sum of 50,000 crowns to avoid being pillaged.

=== Subsequent developments ===
Louis XIV renamed the town Saint-Antonin-Noble-Val and financed major improvements. It became an important supplier of leather and linen. In 1681, Protestants were excluded from politics and the town council, but the town still has a Protestant temple. After this period, the town gradually lost its privileges and its influence declined. For a while after the French Revolution, the town was renamed Libre-Val, but soon reverted to Saint-Antonin.

On the creation of the French departments, Saint-Antonin was incorporated into the Department of Aveyron, but was seconded to the Tarn-et-Garonne Department in 1808 by Napoleon. In 1962, Noble-Val was appended to the town's name once more.

Today, Saint-Antonin-Noble-Val still has an authentically medieval layout, the streets and many facades of the town centre having hardly changed over 800 years. It features a range of stone arched and half-timbered houses and covered walkways listed in the French national heritage records.

== Sites and monuments ==
=== Religious monuments ===
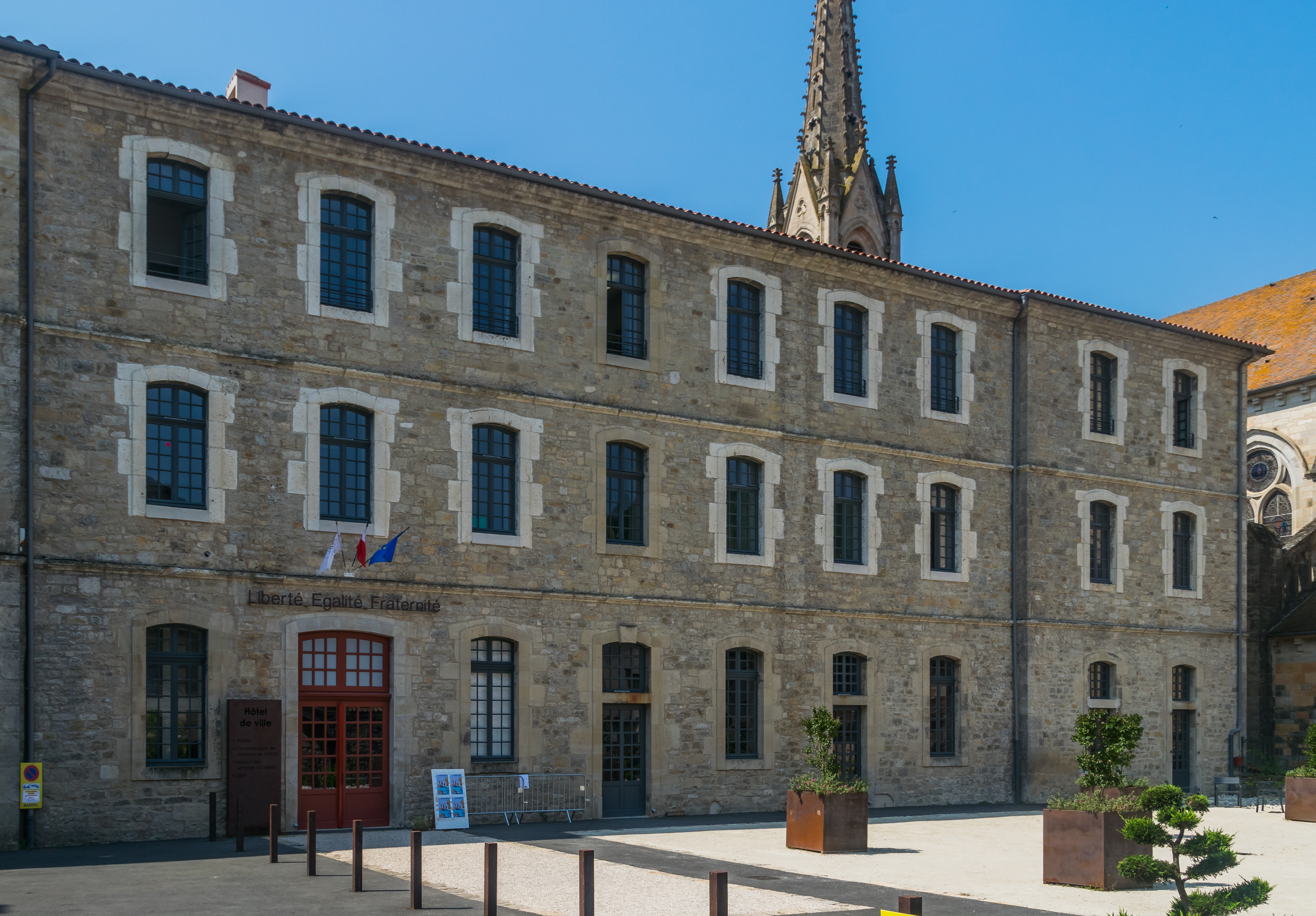
The Hôtel de Ville (town hall)

- Church of St. Antonin
- Church of St Sabina at Sainte-Sabine
- Chapel of Notre-Dame in the remains of the former abbey
- Church of the Nativity of Our Lady at Servanac
- Church of Our Lady of the Rosary at Bosc
- Protestant temple
- Former convent of the Génovéfains, now the Hôtel de Ville (town hall)
- The Priory of Costejean (Note: The Coste-Jean community of nuns was founded on 3 August 1292, by Elizabeth de Vatal, widow of Bertrand de Beaufort, who gave all her property to Leyme Abbey, provided the abbess founded a religious house in Saint-Antonin.)
- Oratory of Notre-Dame-de-la-Salette at Servanac
- The market cross in place de la Halle.

=== Civil monuments ===
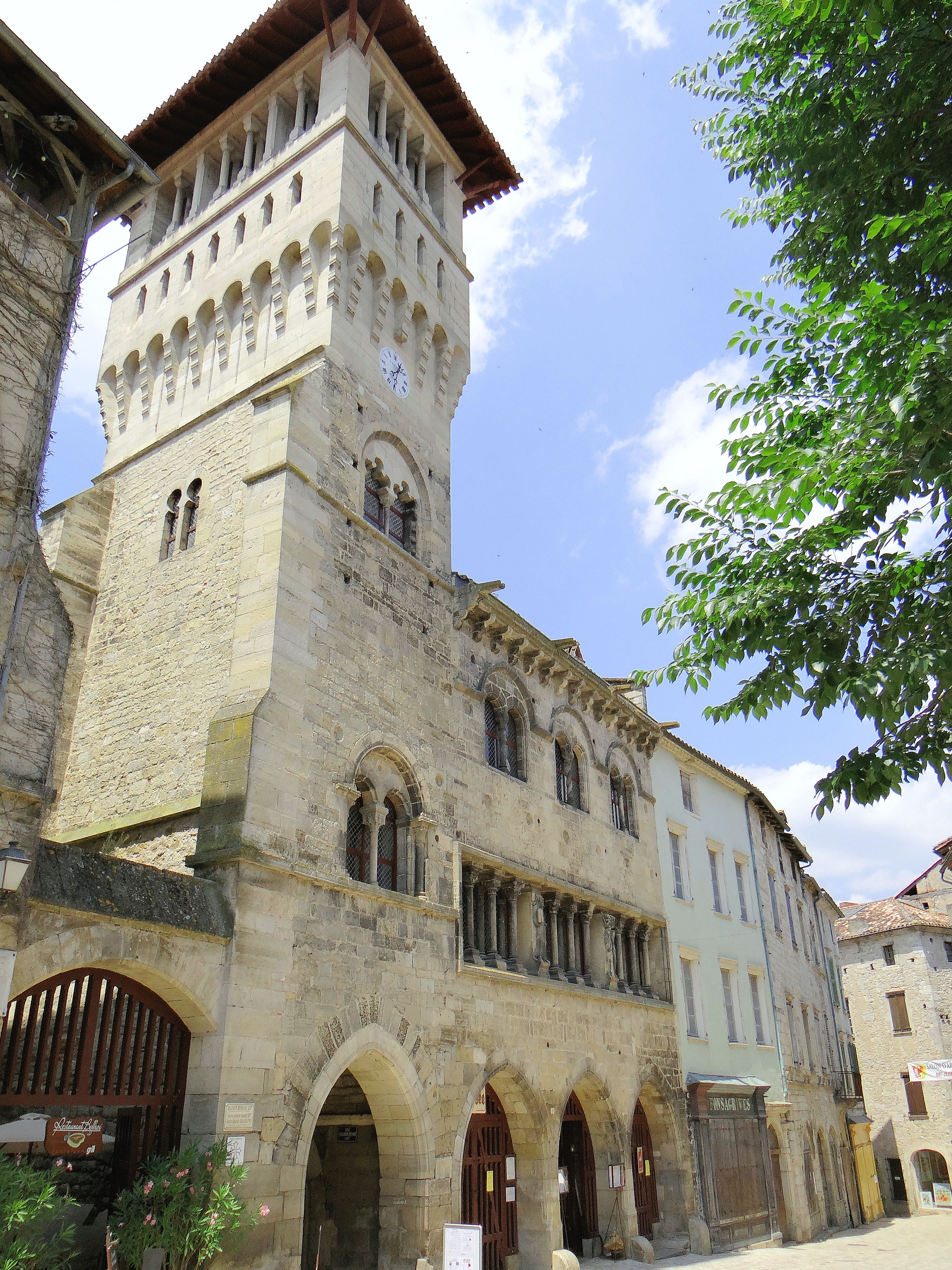
Maison des Consuls

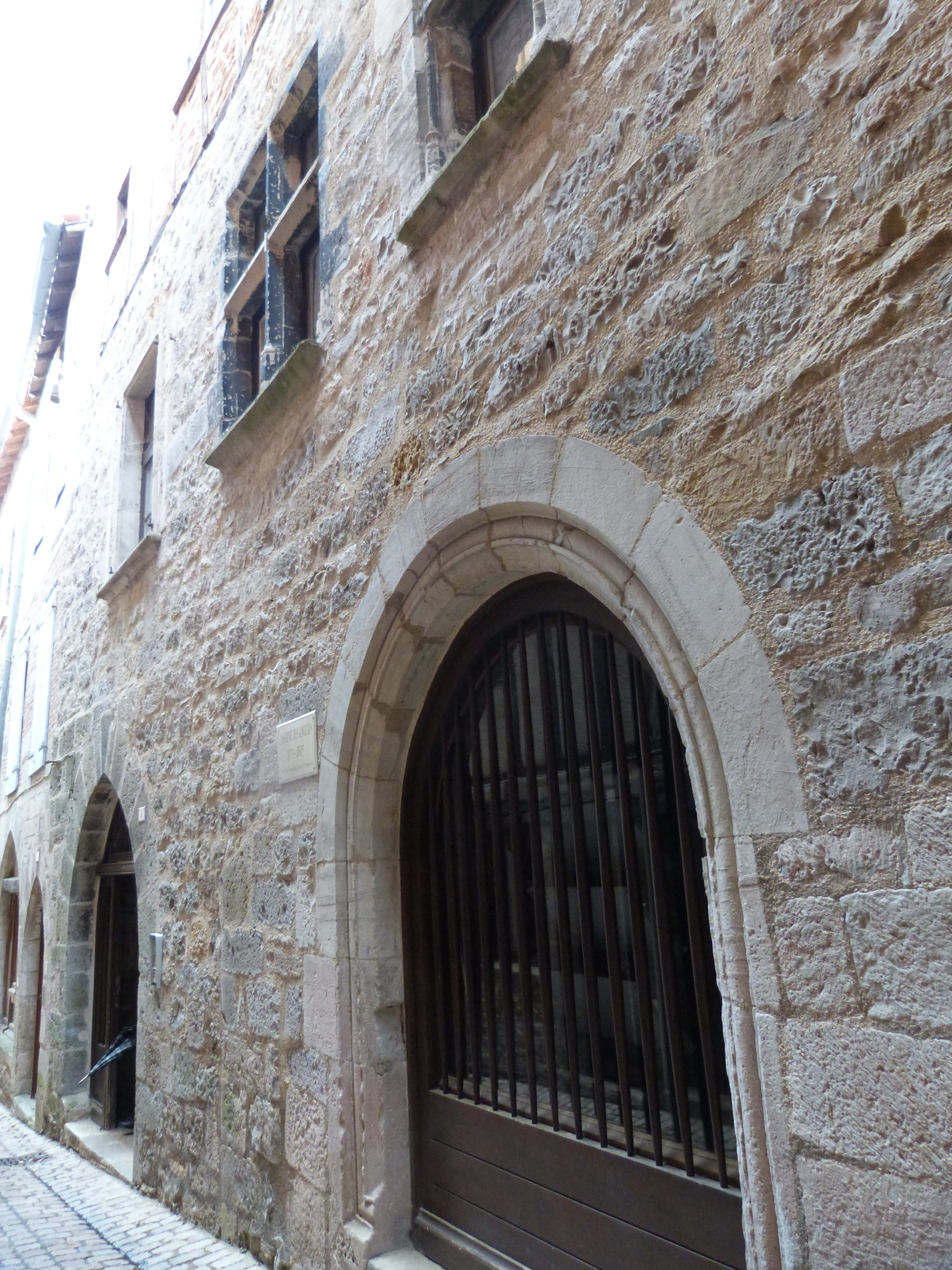
Caserne des Anglais

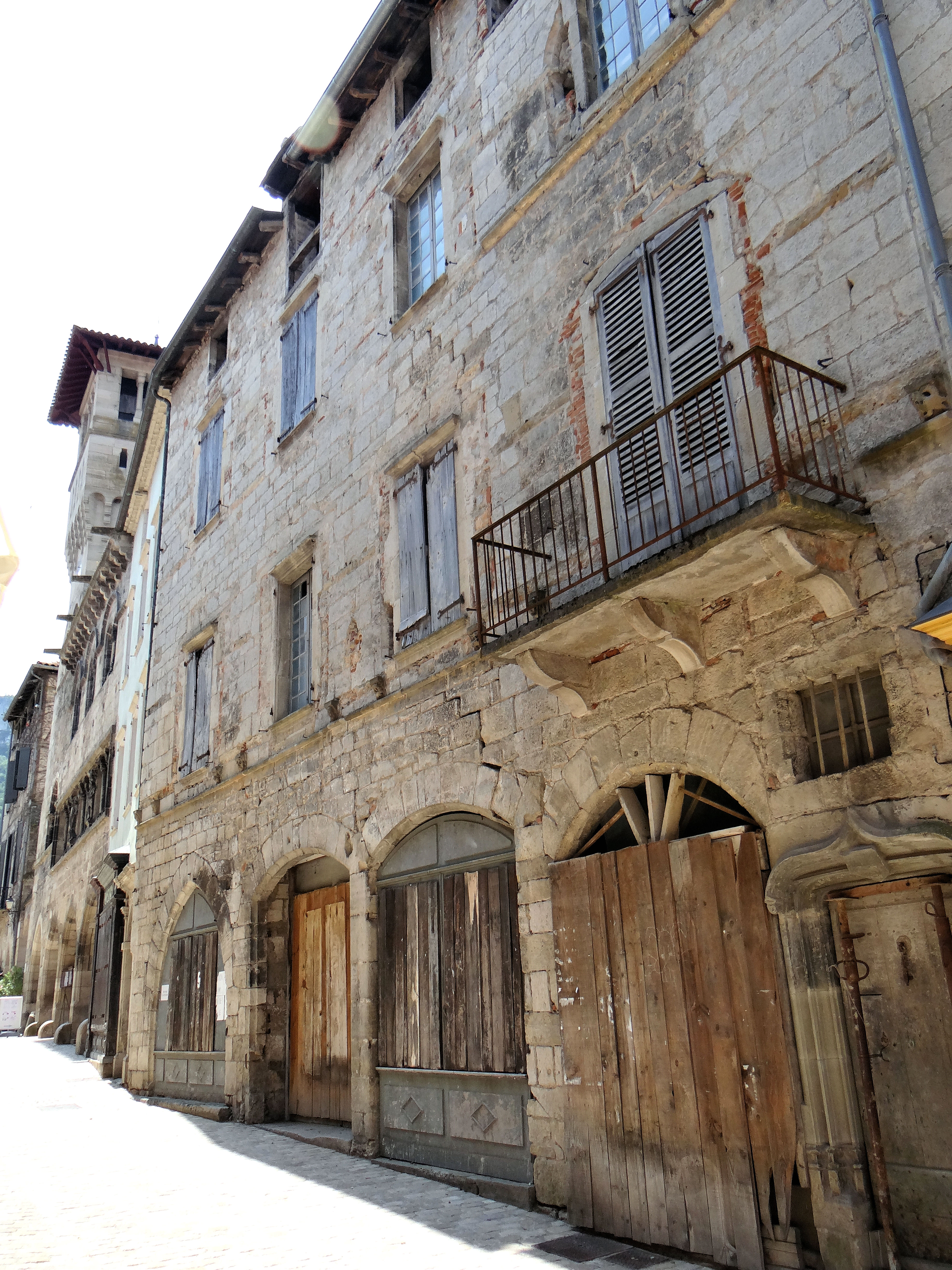
Maison Muratet

- The Old Town Hall (Maison des Consuls), built in 1125 for Archambault and subsequently the residence of the ruling viscounts before becoming the seat of the consuls in 1313. The facade features two carvings of very high quality; Adam and Eve with the serpent under the tree of knowledge, and the Emperor Justinian as law-giver, bearing a staff surmounted by the Imperial Eagle and holding an inscription which reads: it is meet that his Imperial Majesty should be empowered not just by force of arms but also by the power of Justice. (Note: When the controversial architect and restorationist Eugène Viollet-le-Duc came in 1842 to study the nearby Beaulieu-en-Rouergue Abbey, he identified this Romanesque building as a town hall. However, its sculpted decoration reflects a judicial function.) Eugène Viollet-le-Duc undertook its restoration in 1846 with the help of the architect Théodore Olivier. It now houses Saint-Antonin's charming old-fashioned museum.
- In addition to the Old Town Hall, several houses are designated as Monument historique:
  - The Caserne des Anglais (English Barracks) house, rue Guilhem-Peyré, was a base for English troops from 1352 to 1354, and eventually became a royal barracks. In 1685, dragoons were based here. After the Revolution, it was converted into a town house. The building has two stone levels topped by a third of half-timbered brick. The street facade is pierced by two entrances; the pointed arch on the left dates from the 13th or 14th century, and the simple moulded arch to the right features a 17th-century wooden door. Three mullioned windows illuminate the first floor (end 15th - early 16th century). Wooden galleries crown the top floor.
  - The Muratet house is an interesting example of medieval civil construction. Partly built in the early 13th century and enlarged in the 15th, the original building was probably a farmhouse. The façade, despite changes in the 19th century, retains its ashlar dressing and all the elements needed to understand its original order: three levels bordered by projecting moulded string courses (the first string based on a series of carved corbels); a series of arches on the lowest level (ground floor shops); two rows of four double windows in a pointed arch, connected by transom strings. At the end of the 15th century, the pointed arcades on the ground floor were replaced by segmental arches and a door lintel decorated with an ogee arch. Most double casement windows were transformed into quads. The elevation facing the courtyard was rebuilt with rubble at the end of the 15th century. The first floor consisted of two rooms separated by a wood-framed cob wall, supported by a central masonry pillar. Important remnants of a mural depicting griffins on interlaced medallions and an upper frieze of heraldic knights, dating to the first half of the 13th century are preserved on this wall. A spiral staircase with load-bearing core is built into an oval shell half protruding through the side façade, starting from the street. With its ogee-arched front door and various openings, its construction can be dated to the late 14th or early 15th century. It is considered to be one of the first examples of the spiral staircases which gradually replaced older square staircases of wood or stone in Saint-Antonin.
  - The Le Maréchal house, rue Cayssac: is a 13th-century building which gives an insight to the layout of a medieval residence. It consists of two structures at right angles to each other, with a wine cellar, two residential floors and an attic. Originally the house spanned an alley. On the first floor is a double window which is decorated with plants and false masonry and has window seats. Indentations indicate the position of ropes that supported curtains to divide the room.
  - The Leris house, place de la Halle, is an interesting example of a 15th-century commercial building façade. At street level it has a door and wide low and moulded arches. In courtyard, the façade has two doors and the stone work is adorned with abundant mouldings and carved pinnacles. In the courtyard, another door is surmounted by a shield supported by two monsters with human heads and griffins' feet, and surrounded by a garland.
  - The Ave Maria house, rue des Carmes, was the seat of the Brotherhood of the Virgin. The front door has an inscription engraved on pilasters up to the horizontal mullion: "Ave Mar. Gra. Pln. Na". It has an intact suite of four windows forming the first floor gallery. These cross-mullioned windows are separated by pilasters with pseudo corinthian capitals.
  - The Amour house appears to date from the 14th century. It has a ground floor built of stone, topped by a three-storey brick-filled timber frame slightly jettied from the ground floor. The ground floor is broken by three bays. The front door is flanked by two low arches corresponding to former shops. The one on the right has a two-headed keystone of a man and woman kissing. This house was a brothel in the Middle Ages, which no doubt links to the sign.
  - The Nut Oil Mill, in place Bessarel, is a much altered 15th century stone and half-timbered building. The ground floor has a 19th-century vertical stone mill wheel which crushed the nuts. Pivoting on a bed of stone, powered by a donkey or a horse, this granite millstone created a paste. This was then heated over low heat in a copper cauldron and then passed under a press consisting of a beam of about five metres, fixed to a frame, having its axis of rotation at one end and a screw capstan the other end, and producing a pressure of approximately 30 tons for 20 kg of nuts under the third of the beam near the axis of rotation.

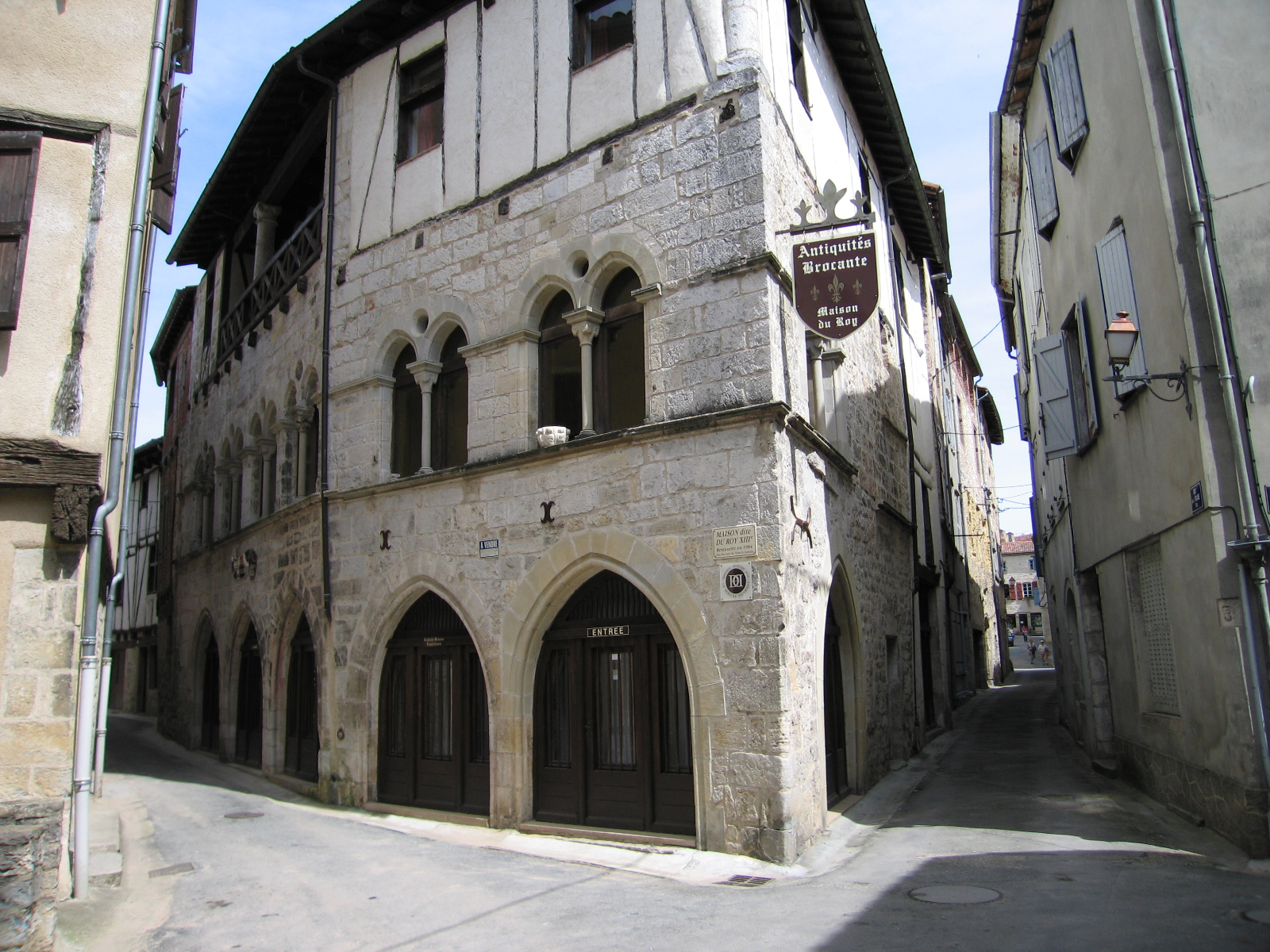
House known as Maison du Roy

- Other houses not registered or classified as historical monuments that are of architectural interest:
  - the house known as the King's (Maison du roy), in place de la Jogaria
  - the 13th century stone house at 14 rue Guilhem-Peyre
  - the wood-framed house at 53 rue Droite
  - houses in the street of Porte de Rodanèze
  - an inn or passage house (L'Auberge du Lion D'Or) situated in the Rue de Bombecul / Rue Basse Des Carmes
  - the Sonnets house
- Market hall
- Bridge over the Aveyron
- Former spa building
- "Le Querlys" Cinema

Of the former tanneries that were situated along the Bonnette river, there are only a few buildings.

=== Local sites ===
- fr: Fontalès prehistoric site
- Roc d'Anglars viewpoint
- Cirque du Bône

== Individuals linked to the town ==
- St Antonin (ca 453 - ca 506).
- Raymond-Jourdain of St. Antoninus (12th century), knight and troubadour, born in the town to the viscounts family .
- The La Valette-Parisot family is from the town.
- Peter von Pennavaire (1680 – 1759), Prussian cavalry lieutenant general.
- Amélie Galup (1856 - 1943)
- Cadène Lucien (1887 - 1958), painter inspired by the landscape of the town.
- Pierre de Castelnau-Bretenoux (1298 - 1333), archdeacon of the town from 1317 .
- Charles Domont (1901 - 1976), speleologist born in the town.
- Joaquim Amat-Piniella (1913 - 1974), Spanish writer who spent his convalescence in the town after four years in the Mauthausen concentration camp.
- Danielle Bonel (1919 - 2012), French actress, secretary and confidante of the singer Edith Piaf for 26 years.
- Andre Laban (1928 - 2018), underwater painter.
- Thomas Merton lived here in the mid-1920s.

== Film location ==
The town was used as a location for the 2001 film Charlotte Gray, starring Cate Blanchett.

It was used as a location in the film The Hundred-Foot Journey starring Helen Mirren released in August 2014.
