= Arnaud de Villemur =

Arnaud de Villemur C.R.S.A.
- Cardinal-Priest of San Sisto
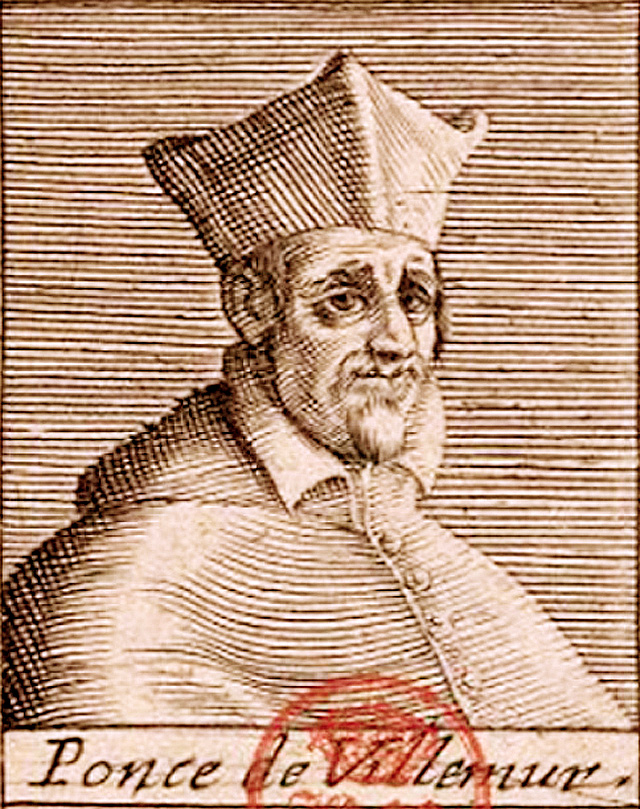
- Church: Catholic Church
- See: San Sisto
- In office: 17 December 1350 – 28 October 1355
- Predecessor: Pope Leo VII
- Successor: Nicolás Rossell
- Previous posts: Bishop of Pamiers (1348-1350); Bishop of Périgueux (1347-1348)

Orders
- Created cardinal: 17 December 1350 by Pope Clement VI

Personal details
- Born: Villemur, Duchy of Gascony
- Died: 28 October 1355 Avignon, Comtat Venaissin, Papal States

Arnaud de Villemur O.Can.S.A. (died 28 October 1355) was a cardinal of the Catholic Church. He was bishop of Pamiers, France.

He was made cardinal on 17 December 1350 by Pope Clement VI.

== Biography ==
He was a member of the Canons Regular of Saint Augustine and obtained a doctorate in canon law.

Arnaud de Villemur was ordained prior of Sos (then in the diocese of Pamiers). Then, becoming a renowned canonist, he was appointed Bishop of Périgueux on 15 October 1347, then transferred to the Diocese of Pamiers on 13 February 1348. He held this position until his appointment as Cardinal of Saint Sixtus at the consistory on 17 December 1350.

He entered the Roman Curia on 3 February 1351, and participated in the Conclave of 1352 to elect Pope Innocent VI.

He died suddenly on 28 October 1355 in Avignon.

It should not be confused with two other Arnaud de Villemur: the first was a French knight and vassal of Simon de Montfort and the second abbot of Saint-Sernin de Toulouse between 1262 and 1289.

== Bibliography ==
- Fr. du Chesne, Histoire de tous les cardinaux françois de naissance ou qui ont été promus au cardinalat par l’expresse recommandation de nos roys, Paris, 1660. Ponce de Villemur [http://archive.wikiwix.com/cache/?url=https%3A%2F%2Fgallica.bnf.fr%2Fark%3A%2F12148%2Fbpt6k914067%2Ff550.tabl archive
- É. Baluze, Vitae paparum Avenionensium, sive collectio actorum veterum, Vol. I et II. Paris, 1693.
- Guillaume Mollat, Contribution à l’histoire du Sacré Collège de Clément V à Eugène IV, Revue d’histoire ecclésiastique, T. XLVI, 1961.
