= François-Étienne Caulet =

French bishop and Jansenist

François-Étienne Caulet (born at Toulouse, 1610; died at Pamiers, 1680) was a French bishop and Jansenist.

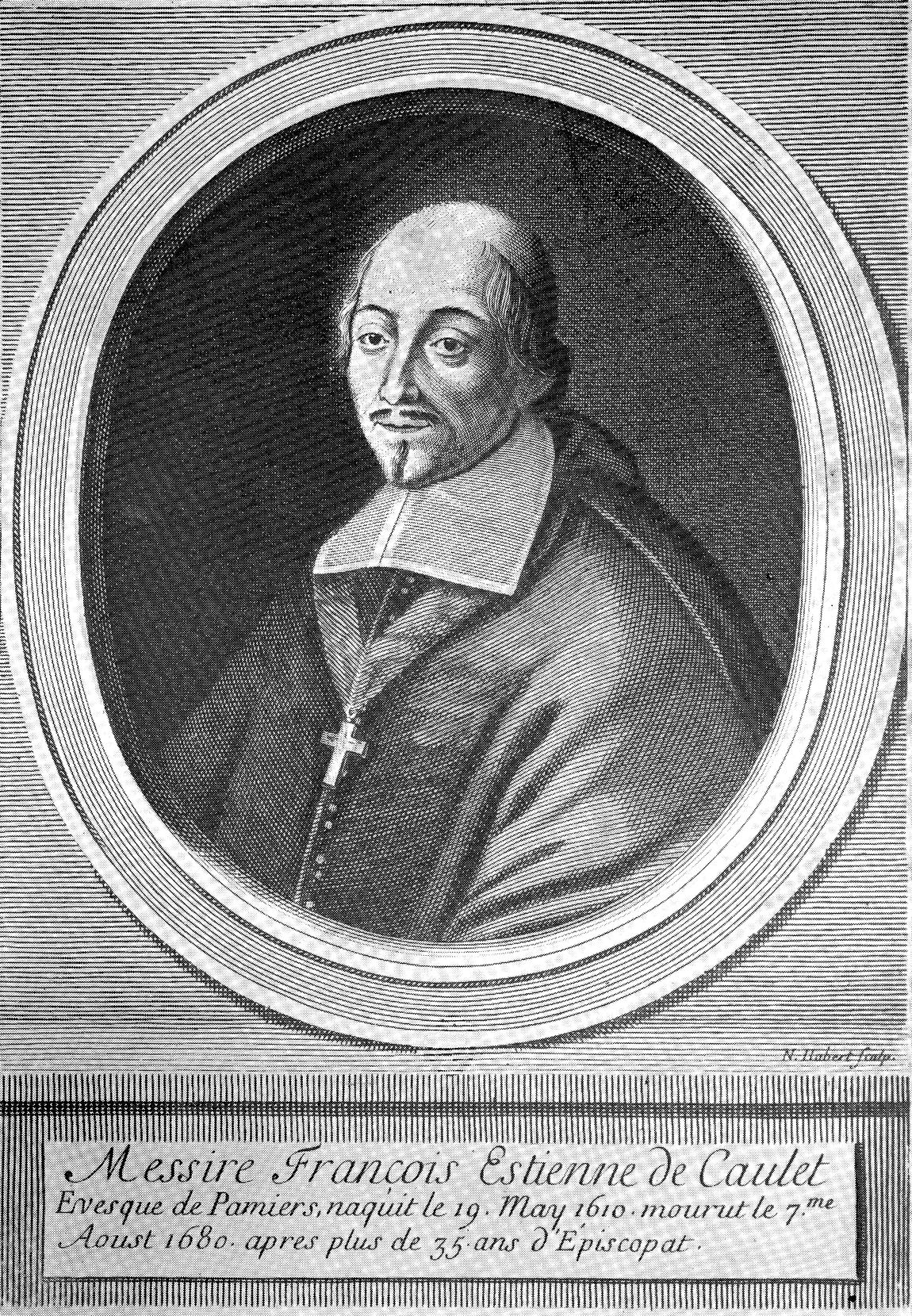
François-Étienne Caulet

== Life ==
After completing his studies at the Collège of La Flèche, Caulet worked for some time under Charles de Condren, Superior of the French Oratory. He then joined Jean-Jacques Olier in founding the Vaugirard Seminary and the Company of Saint-Sulpice. When Olier accepted the parish of Saint-Sulpice (1642), Caulet became practically the head of the seminary.

In 1644 Louis XIV, at the suggestion of Vincent de Paul, made him Bishop of Pamiers. Caulet had not sought episcopal honours, but once a bishop he showed great zeal in the reformation of the clergy, the annual visitation of the diocese, the holding of synods, and the founding of schools, one of which was devoted especially to the training of teachers. The chapters of Foix and Pamiers, which he tried to reform, revolted openly, and had to be coerced into submission by Briefs of Pope Alexander VII and ordinances of Louis XIV.

Two facts stand out prominently in Caulet's episcopal career, his attitude with regard to the formulary of Alexander VII and his conduct in the affaire de la régale, i.e. the royal pretension to the revenues and the administration of vacant sees. On receipt of the formulary of Alexander VII Caulet issued a pastoral letter requesting his clergy to subscribe to it, but with certain qualifications (foi aux dogmes révélés, déférence respectueuse aux faits non révélés). Most people see in that respectful deference the silence respectueux of the Jansenists. However, De la Chambre (Traité du formulaire), Bouix (De Papâ, II, 95), and Bertrand (Histoire littéraire, III, 19) are of the opinion that Caulet really meant an internal adhesion of the mind, albeit this adhesion may not have come up to the "ecclesiastical faith" as proposed by Fénelon, and later admitted commonly by theologians. Pope Clement IX did not urge the point, and accepted Caulet's adhesion such as it was.

In February, 1673, Louis XIV, in need of funds, attempted to extend to all French bishoprics the droits de régale. Caulet was one of the few bishops who resisted this, appealing to Pope Innocent XI. The Pope issued several Briefs, lauding Caulet's courage and his loyalty to the Catholic Church. The last of these Briefs, dated 17 July 1680 (Inn. XI, epistolae, Rome, 1890, I, 357), reached Pamiers just after Caulet's death.

Caulet left a mass of episcopal ordinances, synodal statutes, memoirs, etc., analyzed by Doublet and Bertrand. Two treatises on the régale were published under his name in 1680 and 1681.

== Bibliography ==
- Doublet, Georges (1895). Un prélat janséniste F. de Caulet: réformateur des chapitres de Foix et de Pamiers (in French). Foix: Foix-Gadrat Ainé.
