= Pietro da Lucca =

Canon Regular of the Lateran

Pietro Ritta of Lucca (died 1522) was a Canon Regular of the Lateran noted for his preaching who became "one of the most widely read devotional writers of the early sixteenth century". He was an early promoter of the exemplary status of Elena Duglioli.

== Publications ==
Only first editions are listed; all were much reprinted.

- Regule de la vita spirituale et secreta theologia (Bologna, Giovanni Antonio Benedetti, 1504)
- Fundamento della vita christiana cioe tractato utilissimo della humilta novamente composto (Bologna, Giovanni Antonio Benedetti, 1506)
- Opusculo de trenta documenti. Per le persone desiderano essere spirituale (Bologna, Giovanni Antonio Benedetti and Girolamo Benedetti, 1512)
- Doctrina del ben morire (Venezia, Simone da Lovere, 1515)
  - French translation by Pierre Frizon as La doctrine de bien mourir (Paris, Thomas Brumen, 1584)
  - English translation by Richard Verstegan as A dialogue of dying wel. First written in the Italian tongue, by the reverend father Don Peeter of Luca, a chanon regular, a Doctor of Divinitie and famous preacher. Wherin is also contayned sundry profitable resolutions, upon some doubtful questions in divinitie. Translated first into French, and now into English (Antwerp, Arnout Conincx, 1603)
- Arte nova del ben pensare e contemplare la passione dil nostro signor Giesu Christo benedetto (Bologna, Girolamo Benedetti, 1523)
