= Pierre Frizon =

French clergyman and translator

Pierre Frizon (1534–1596) was a French clergyman and translator who was active on behalf of the Catholic League.

== Life ==
Frizon became a canon of Reims Cathedral in 1572, and dean of the chapter in 1587. In 1589 he was the Duke of Mayenne's envoy to Rome to seek papal support of the Catholic League. He died at Verdun in 1596.

== Publications ==
- Pietro da Lucca, La doctrine de bien mourir, translated by Pierre Frizon (Paris, Thomas Brumen, 1584)
- Gaspar de Loarte, La consolation des affligez ou il est traicté des fruicts et remedes des tribulations, translated by Pierre Frizon (Paris, Thomas Brumen, 1584)
