= Marktrecht =

Marktrecht was the medieval right to hold markets in German Market Towns. is reflected in the prefix Markt of the names of many towns in Austria and Germany, for example, Markt Berolzheim or Marktbergel. Other terms used for market towns were Flecken in northern Germany, or Freiheit and Wigbold in Westphalia.

Market rights were designated as long ago as during the Carolingian Empire. Around 800, Charlemagne granted the title of a market town to Esslingen am Neckar. Conrad created a number of market towns in Saxony throughout the 11th century and did much to develop peaceful markets by granting a special 'peace' to merchants and a special and permanent 'peace' to market-places. With the rise of the territories, the ability to designate market towns was passed to the princes and dukes, as the basis of German town law.

The local ordinance status of a market town (Marktgemeinde or Markt) is perpetuated through the law of Austria, the German state of Bavaria, and the Italian province of South Tyrol. Nevertheless, the title has no further legal significance, as it does not grant any privileges.
