= Ascaric (bishop of Palencia) =

Spanish Catholic bishop

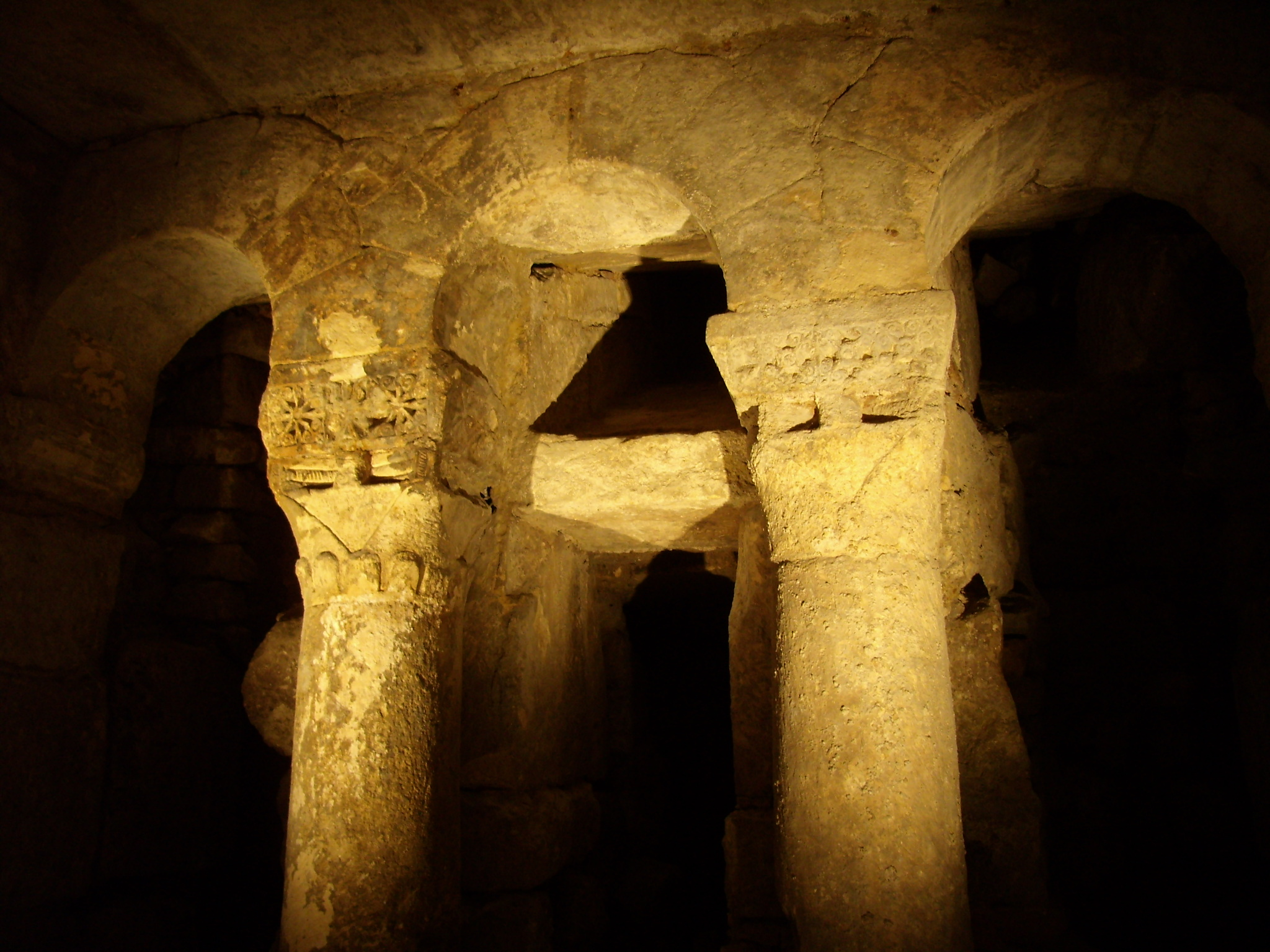
Crypt of San Antolín, sometimes associated with Ascaric

Ascaric (Spanish: Ascario or Ascarico, Latin: Ascaricus), a Visigoth, was the fourth known Bishop of Palencia from about 639 to about 673. He only appears as a signatory of the canons of the Eighth Council of Toledo in 653. A local tradition, however, places him at the side of king Wamba during the Septimanian rebellion of Paul and Hilderic in 672. To Ascaric is sometimes credited the reedification of Palencia and the deposition of the relics of Antoninus of Pamiers in the Crypt of San Antolín.

== Sources ==
- Lambert, A. "Ascaric (évêque de Palencia)." DHGE, 4 (1930), col. 884.
