= Jus spolii =

Claim of succession to property of deceased clerics

The jus spolii (also called jus exuviarum or rapite capite), the Latin for right of spoil, was a claim of succession to the property of deceased clerics, at least such as they had derived from their ecclesiastical benefices.

It was an outcome of ancient canons which forbade clerics to dispose by will of goods accruing from their ecclesiastical office. These canons were gradually relaxed because of the difficulty of distinguishing between ecclesiastical and patrimonial property. Abuses then arose: Churches were despoiled at the death of their incumbents; bishops and archdeacons seized for the cathedral the spoil of abbeys and other benefices, on the pretence that all other churches were but offshoots of the cathedral.

After the fall of the Western Empire, anyone present at the death of a cleric felt at liberty to carry off whatever property of the deceased, ecclesiastical or otherwise, he could seize (rapite capite, seize and take).

As the civil power became more conscious of itself it began to restrain this indiscriminate plunder. The sovereign claimed for himself the "Jus Spolii" in the case of deceased bishops, while the smaller feudal lords laid similar claim to the property of all clerics who died in their domains.

Councils (Tribur, 895; Trosly, 909; Clermont, 1095; II Lateran, 1139) of the Church legislated against these abuses, finally obtaining a renunciation of this so-called right.

In the thirteenth century the Roman Church put forth in a modified way the same claim, and it eventually became a principle of canon law that the goods of beneficed ecclesiastics, dying intestate, belonged of right to the papal treasury. This right however was not allowed in France, Germany, Belgium or Portugal. In the Kingdom of Naples a compromise was made at the close of the sixteenth century, whereby the right was renounced for an annual payment to the papal treasury.

== Sources ==
- Herbermann, Charles, ed. (1913). "Jus Spolii" . Catholic Encyclopedia. New York: Robert Appleton Company.
