= Albert-Marie de Monléon =

French Roman Catholic bishop (1934–2019)

Albert-Marie de Monléon O.P.
- Bishop of Meaux
- Church: Catholic Church
- Diocese: Diocese of Meaux
- In office: 17 August 1999 – 9 August 2012
- Predecessor: Louis Cornet
- Successor: Jean-Yves Nahmias
- Previous post: Bishop of Pamiers (1988-1999)

Orders
- Ordination: 5 July 1964 by Alexandre Renard
- Consecration: 1 October 1988 by André Collini

Personal details
- Born: 20 January 1937 Paris, France
- Died: 29 April 2019 (aged 82) Paris, France

Albert-Marie Joseph Cyrille de Monléon (20 January 1934 - 29 April 2019) was a French Roman Catholic bishop.

De Monléon was born in France and was ordained to the priesthood in 1964. He served as bishop of the Roman Catholic Diocese of Pamiers from 1988 to 1999 and served as bishop of the Roman Catholic Diocese of Meaux from 1999 to 2012.

He took part in the Catholic Charismatic Renewal and became founder of the priestly branch of the Emmanuel Community. Later he was appointed to the Pontifical Council for the Laity, as Spiritual Adviser of the Catholic Fraternity (1990-2007) in the Charismatic Renewal.
