= Bernard Saisset =

French bishop

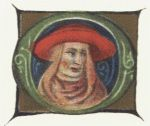
- Born: c. 1232 France
- Died: c. 1314 Pamiers, France
- Occupation: Bishop of Pamiers

Bernard Saisset (c. 1232 – c. December 1314) was an Occitan bishop of Pamiers, in the County of Foix in the south of France, whose outspoken disrespect for Philip IV of France incurred charges of high treason in the overheated atmosphere of tension between the king and his ministry and Pope Boniface VIII, leading up to the papal bull Unam sanctam of 1302.

== Biography ==
Saisset is famous in French history for his opposition to Philip IV. As an ardent Occitan aristocrat of an old noble family, he despised the northern “Frankish” French, and publicly demonstrated it by decrying the Parisian bishop of Toulouse, Pierre de la Chapelle-Taillefer, as “useless to the Church and the country, because he was of a speech that was always an enemy... because the people of the country hate him because of that language.” Further, Saisset was sent in 1301 as a papal legate to Philip IV to protest the king’s anticlerical measures. But on his return to Pamiers he was denounced to the king as having tried to raise a rebellion of Occitan independence, associated with Navarre, under the banner of the Count of Foix (with whom Saisset had until very recently been embroiled in the courts). The king charged two northerners, Richard Leneveu, archdeacon of Auge in the Roman Catholic Diocese of Lisieux, and Jean de Picquigni, vidame of Amiens, to make an investigation, which lasted several months. Philip’s ministry had a well-earned reputation for judicial violence, and Saisset was on the point of escaping to Rome when the vidame of Amiens surprised him by night in his episcopal palace at Pamiers. He was brought to Senlis, and on October 24, 1301 he appeared before Philip and his court. The chancellor Pierre Flotte charged him with high treason, and the old charges of heresy and blasphemy that were always easily levelled against 13th century Occitans, and for saying that Saint Louis was in Hell and should never have been canonized, and other less than credible charges. By a judicial fiction he was placed in the comparative safe keeping of his own metropolitan, the archbishop of Narbonne, Gilles I Aycelin de Montaigu.

Philip IV tried to obtain from the pope the canonical degradation of Saisset that was necessary before proceeding against him. Boniface VIII, instead, ordered the king to free the bishop, in order that he might go to Rome to justify himself, which opened a new stage in the quarrel between the pope and king that had been simmering since the Bull Clericis laicos of 1296. In the heat of the new struggle, Saisset was fortunately forgotten. He had been turned over in February 1302 into the keeping of Jacques des Normands, the papal legate, and was ordered to leave the kingdom at once. He lived at Rome until after the incident at Anagni.

In 1308, with a more tractable new pope (Clement V) in residence at Avignon, the king pardoned Saisset, and restored him to his see. He died in Pamiers, still its bishop, about 1314.

== Bibliography ==
- Jeffrey H. Denton, "Bernard Saisset and the Franco-papal Rift of December 1301", in Revue d’histoire ecclésiastique, 102/2, 2007, p. 399-427.
- Joseph R. Strayer, The Reign of Philip the Fair, Princeton, 1980.
- Julien Théry, "The Pioneer of Royal Theocracy. Guillaume de Nogaret and the conflicts between Philip the Fair and the Papacy", in The Capetian Century, 1214-1314, ed. by William Chester Jordan, Jenna Rebecca Phillips, Turnhout, Brepols, 2017, p. 219-259.
- (in French) Jean-Marie Vidal, "Bernard Saisset, évêque de Pamiers (1232-1311)", Revue des Sciences religieuses 5 (1925), p. 417-438 et 565-590, 6 (1926), p. 50-77, 177-198 et 371-393, réimpr. en volume sous le titre Bernard Saisset (1232-1311), Toulouse, Paris, 1926.
