= Diocese of Pamiers =

Catholic diocese in France

Coordinates: 43.11°N 1.61°E

Diocese of Pamiers-Couserans-Mirepoix Dioecesis Apamiensis-Couseranensis-Mirapicensis Diocèse de Pamiers-Mirepoix-Couserans

Catholic
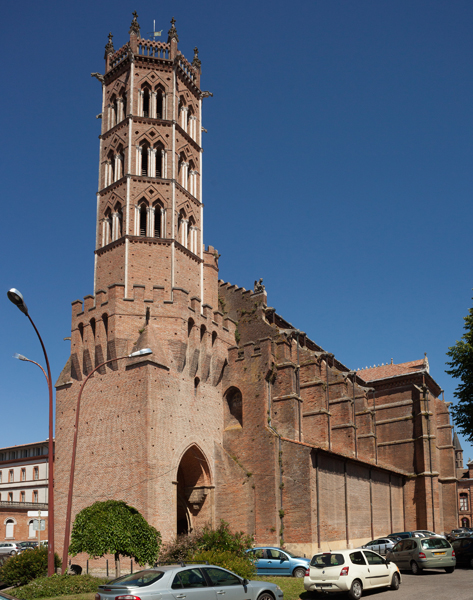
- Pamiers Cathedral

Location
- Country: Foix, France
- Ecclesiastical province: Toulouse
- Metropolitan: Archdiocese of Toulouse

Statistics
- Area: 4,903 km^{2} (1,893 sq mi)
- Population: Total; Catholics: (as of 2021); 153,153▼; 106,735▲ (69.7%)
- Parishes: 304

Information
- Denomination: Roman Catholic
- Sui iuris church: Latin Church
- Rite: Roman Rite
- Established: 16 September 1295 (As Diocese of Pamiers); 11 March 1910 (As Diocese of Pamiers-Couserans-Mirepoix)
- Cathedral: Cathedral of St. Antoninus in Pamiers
- Patron saint: St. Antoninus of Pamiers
- Secular priests: 21; 12 Permanent Deacons

Current leadership
- Pope: Leo XIV
- Bishop: Benoît Gschwind
- Metropolitan Archbishop: Guy de Kerimel

Map

Website
- Website of the Diocese; Diocese de Pamiers, Annuaire 2017 (in French)

The Diocese of Pamiers, Couserans, and Mirepoix (Latin: Dioecesis Apamiensis, Couseranensis, et Mirapicensis; French: Diocèse de Pamiers, Mirepoix, et Couserans) is a Latin Church diocese of the Catholic Church in southern France.

Erected in 1295, it was a historical diocese of county of Foix. The diocese was suppressed in 1801, it was restored in 1822. The diocese comprises the department of Ariège and is suffragan to the Archdiocese of Toulouse. The diocese of Pamiers is divided into five Deaneries: Pamiers, Foix, Haut-Ariège, Couserans, and Pays-d'Olmes-Mirapoix. The episcopal see is the Cathedral of Saint Antoninus in the city of Pamiers.

In 2021, in the Diocese of Pamiers, Couserans, and Mirepoix there was one priest for every 5,082 Catholics.

== History ==
The traditions of the diocese mention as its first apostle of Christianity St. Antoninus, born at Fredelacum (Frédélas) near Pamiers in the Rouergue, and martyred in his native country at a date uncertain. Cardinal Cesare Baronius believed that he was one of the martyrs of the Theban Legion in 286. The Abbey of St. Antonin was founded near Fredelacum about 960; in 1034 it passed under the jurisdiction of the Bishop of Girona and was annexed in 1060 to the Congregation of Cluny. By 1095, however, the monastery followed the Rule of Saint Augustine.

A castle built on the site of the abbey by Roger II Count of Foix (1070–1125) was called Appamia; hence the name of Pamiers which passed to the neighbouring small town. The monastery buildings were located a mile and a half outside the walls of the villa that became the city.

=== Creation of the diocese, 1296 ===
Pope Boniface VIII created a see at Pamiers by the Bull Romanus Pontifex 23 July 1295, and made it a suffragan of the Archdiocese of Narbonne. On 16 September 1295 he named the church of the monastery of Saint Antoninus as the cathedral of the new diocese, and promoted Pamiers from the status of villa to the status of civitas. In that bull, also called Romanus Pontifex, he noted that he had taken action in creating the new diocese based on a plan of Pope Clement IV (1265–1268), who had been Bishop of Puy and Archbishop of Narbonne, which had not been put into effect. He named Bernard Saisset, Abbot of St. Antonin as the first Bishop of Pamiers, and by a decree of 18 April 1296 settled the boundaries of the new diocese which had been created out of territory of the large and wealthy diocese of Toulouse. This greatly angered King Philip IV, who believed that his feudal rights were being contravened. The opposition of Hughes Mascaron, Bishop of Toulouse, and the conflict between Saisset and Roger Bernard III, Count of Foix, who had been excommunicated, prevented Bishop Saisset from taking possession of his diocese until their conflict was settled by King Philip IV of France. Bishop Hugues went to Rome to argue his case with Pope Boniface. He died there on 6 December 1296. Saisset took possession of his see on 19 April 1297.

On 18 December 1295, no doubt as a rebuff to the Bishop of Toulouse, Pope Boniface issued the Bull Dum sollicite considerationis, creating the University of Pamiers. On 21 December 1295, he issued the Bull Ad Extirpandam Pestem, naming an Inquisitor for the diocese of Pamiers.

On 5 February 1295, Pope Boniface launched his famous bull Clericis Laicos against Philip IV. Bishop Bernard sided with Pope Boniface VIII (1301) in his conflict with King Philip the Fair and was imprisoned by order of the King. He was released in 1302.

The conflict between Toulouse and Pamiers nonetheless continued, even after the death of Boniface VIII in 1303. The new Pope's strategy was different. Pope Clement V first appointed his nephew, Gaillard de Preyssac, as the new bishop of Toulouse in 1306. Then, after a careful and no doubt disinterested investigation, Pope Clement, on 3 August 1308, agreed to a number of claims of Toulouse concerning the decree of Boniface VIII; the Diocese of Pamiers remained, but with less territory and poorer resources than those assigned it by Boniface VIII. Clement imposed a perpetual silence on the Archbishop of Toulouse and his successors. However, when Pope John XXII raised Toulouse to metropolitan status on 22 February 1318, he also extended the Diocese of Pamiers which he made suffragan of Toulouse.

==== Cathedral and Chapter ====
Before the creation of the diocese in 1295, the inhabitants of the monastery of Saint-Antonin lived as canons regular according to the Rule of Saint Augustine. Bishop Saisset's brief tenure did not permit him to address the matter of the organization of a cathedral chapter or the apportioning of revenues. This was left to his successor, Bishop Pilfort de Rabastens, who immediately met violent opposition from the canons of Saint-Antonin. Prestige, power, and money were at issue. Arbitration finally settled the issues which included the division of income, the power of appointing to various benefices, the creation of the office of prior of the cloister, and the nomination and admission to office of chapter dignities and of canons. The prior was to be elected by the chapter and instituted by the bishop. The dignities (not dignitaries) were: the archdeacon, the treasurer, the sacristan, the infirmarian, the master of works, and the aumonier.

Bishop-elect Pilfort moved his residence from the monastery buildings of Saint-Antonin into the city of Pamiers. This separated him from his cathedral and from the Canons.

In 1371 Pope Gregory XI reduced the number of Canons in the Cathedral Chapter to 18, and Pope Eugene IV further reduced the number to 12. In 1693 there were only four dignities, and 12 Canons. In 1787 there were six dignities, but only 9 Canons.

=== Inquisition ===
The third bishop of Pamiers was Jacques Fournier (1317–1326), who subsequently was elected pope under the name of Benedict XII. The historian of Pamiers, Jean-Marie Vidal, discovered in the Vatican Library the record of the procedure of the Inquisition tribunal created at Pamiers by Jacques Fournier in 1318, for the extirpation of the remnants of Albigensianism in the Foix region. This document is most important for the history of the Inquisition, representing as it does, and perhaps in this instance only, that particular tribunal in which the inquisitor and the diocesan bishop had almost equal responsibility, as decreed in 1312 by the Council of Vienne. In this new regime the traditional procedure of the Inquisition was made milder by temporizing with the accused who persisted in error, by granting defendants a fair amount of liberty, and by improving the prison regime.

=== Troubles in Foix and Pamiers ===
In 1485, Jean de Foix, Vicomte de Narbonne, the uncle of Countess Catherine de Foix the legitimate heir of François-Phoebus, came to Pamiers to demand homage. He threatened reprisals if he did not get what he wanted. A representative of the city received the Vicomte at the gate, but declared that the city had taken its oath to Countess Catherine; they would nonetheless receive the Vicomte as a member of the House of Foix. Angered, the Vicomte threw his forces at Le Mas, set fire to the gates, used his siege engines against the walls, drove out Bishop Pascal Dufour and established in his place Mathieu d'Artigueloube. He then turned on the Porte de Lolmet of Pamiers, without success, and withdrew to Mazères. Next year, on 14 July, the Vicomte's forces returned and attacked Pamiers. They entered and pillaged the city and imprisoned the leaders who favored the Countess. Her forces arrived on 28 August, entered and rescued the city, killing the leader of the attackers, the Sieur de Lavelanet. In April 1486, the Parlement of Toulouse issued an order declaring that the income of the bishopric of Pamiers should be divided, one-third for Bishop Pascal Dufour, one-third for Mathieu d'Artigueloube, and one-third for the repair of the church of Le Mas; it also ordered that the seat of the bishop should be transferred to Lieurac.

Jean de Foix, Vicomte de Narbonne, died in November 1500, and the one contending bishop for succession to Pierre de Castelbajac, Gerand Jean, died in September 1501, but the conflict over the episcopal seat of Pamiers did not abate. Mathieu d'Artigueloube arrived immediately from Paris and sent a Commissioner from the Parlement of Paris to take possession of the diocese on 4 October 1501. The Commissioner was refused entry on the grounds that a plague was active, but he returned on the 7th, and his demand to place the arms of Mathieu d'Artigueloube above the door of the episcopal palace was agreed to by the Consuls of Pamiers. Mathieu then used his influence with the Vicomtes de Narbonne to have the Parlement of Toulouse to place the Diocese of Pamiers and the Abbey of Lḕzat in the hands of the King of France, Louis XII. Two parliamentary Commissioners arrived in Pamiers on 29 February 1503 to carry out the orders of the Parlement, but they could not obtain the submission of the Abbey of Lḕzat since the Abbot, Cardinal Amanieu d'Albret, was in Rome. The Commissioners ordered the Officers of the diocese to administer the temporal goods of the diocese and to turn over the income to the Consuls of Pamiers to control.

Mathieu d'Artigueloube died on 30 March 1513. The Consuls of Pamiers immediately went to the Canons at Le Mas, and informed them of the fact, begging them to name a bishop to bring peace to the Church of Pamiers. The Canons designated the Protonotary Apostolic Bertrand de Lordat, who immediately began to function as though he were bishop, though he did not canonically become bishop until ten years later. Pope Leo X had named Cardinal Amanieu d'Albret as Administrator of the diocese and given him his bulls on 15 May 1514. The Cardinal resigned on 15 August 1514 on the appointment of Charles de Gramont as the new Bishop of Pamiers, thereby negating the election of Bertrand de Lordat. Gramont was transferred to the diocese of Couserans on 25 June 1515, and Cardinal d'Albret again took charge as Administrator.

=== Huguenots ===
During the episcopate of Robert of Pellevé (1557–79), brother of Bishop Nicolas de Pellevé of Amiens, the French Wars of Religion gave rise to cruel strife: Protestants destroyed every church in Pamiers, among them the magnificent church of Notre-Dame du Camp, and three times they demolished the episcopal palace of the Mas Saint-Antonin. It was Robert de Pellevé, however, who obtained permission from the Papal Legate, Cardinal Trivulzio, on 24 January 1558 to establish the Jesuits in a collège at Pamiers, the second college to be established by the Jesuits in France. The arrangement was ratified by King François II on 11 February 1559. The efforts of three Jesuit priests to carry out the plan was repeatedly obstructed by the Consuls, as well as by the hostility of Huguenot believers in Pamiers. Nonetheless, the Collège opened at Christmas in 1559. In the same year, Huguenot violence against religious images began with repeated outbreaks of destructive violence. In July 1561 the Consuls of Pamiers absolutely refused to publish the edict of King Charles IX which prohibited Huguenots from assembling publicly or raising troops; in 1562, now thoroughly Protestant, they attempted to close the Jesuit college by not renewing its permit to operate. At the time of the Saint Bartholomew's Day Massacre in 1572, however, Pamiers was in the hands of the Catholic party, and there was every attempt to allow both sides the chance to live in peace and exercise their religions. However, following the Protestant assembly at Montauban on 24 August 1573, the towns of Ludiès and Saverdun were seized, and the nuns of Salenques were forced to flee; an attempt was made in April 1574 by the Huguenots to seize Pamiers, which turned out unsuccessfully.

Another bishop of Pamiers Henri de Sponde (1626–42) (Spondanus), as a recent convert, suggested to Cardinal Baronius the project of producing an epitome of Baronius' twelve volume Annales Ecclesiasti (Ecclesiastical Annals). He carried out the project so well that he won the high praise of the Cardinal and the attention of Pope Paul V, who named Sponde rector of the French church in Rome, San Luigi dei Francesi. Paul V also gave Sponde a post in the Roman Curia as Revisor of Petitions in the office of the Major Penitentiary.

Pamiers also had been governed by the Jansenist François Etienne de Caulet (1644–1680).

=== Revolution ===
In 1790 the National Constituent Assembly decided to bring the French church under the control of the State. Civil government of the provinces was to be reorganized into new units called 'départements', originally intended to be 83 or 84 in number. The dioceses of the Roman Catholic Church were to be reduced in number, to coincide as much as possible with the new departments. Since there were more than 130 bishoprics at the time of the Revolution, more than fifty dioceses needed to be suppressed and their territories consolidated. Clergy would need to take an oath of allegiance to the State and its Constitution, specified by the Civil Constitution of the Clergy, and they would become salaried officials of the State. Both bishops and priests would be elected by special 'electors' in each department. This meant schism, since bishops would no longer need to be approved (preconised) by the Papacy; the transfer of bishops, likewise, which had formerly been the exclusive prerogative of the pope in canon law, would be the privilege of the State; the election of bishops no longer lay with the Cathedral Chapters (which were all abolished), or other responsible clergy, or the Pope, but with electors who did not even have to be Catholics or Christians.

A new civil department, called "Ariège", was created by the French Legislative Assembly, as part of a new Metropolitanate called "Métropole du Sud". The old diocese of Pamiers was suppressed and a new "Diocese of Ariège" was created, with its center at Pamiers. When the Estates General had been summoned in 1789, the legitimate bishop of Pamiers, Joseph-Mathieu d'Agoult, behaved in such an authoritarian and aristocratic way when the cahiers (Notes of complaints and recommendations) were being drawn up that his own clergy refused to elect him as their representative for the meeting in Paris, and chose Canon Bernard Font instead. Canon Font's brother was one of the members of the Assembly who drew up the plan for the new departments. Font was elected bishop of Ariège in 1791, and consecrated at Toulouse by Constitutional Bishop Antoine-Pascal-Hyacinthe Sermet on 15 May 1791. The consecration was valid, but canonically irregular, schismatic, and blasphemous (as a parody of genuine Catholic sacraments).

The new Constitutional Bishop had a difficult time with his clergy, a substantial portion of whom refused the Oath. A portion of the people were offended by the execution of King Louis XVI on 21 January 1793, and nearly everyone was shocked by the abolition of Religion and the substitution of Reason, with the Festival of Reason on 10 November 1793. There was no longer a Catholic church, and there was no longer a Constitutional Church. Bishop Font tried to intercede on behalf of the émigrés and protested against the arrest of opponents of the regime, acts which brought him to be arrested himself at the end of 1793. He was not released until 5 February 1795, after which he immediately went into hiding for more than a year. He established himself at Foix, where he assembled some 82 priests who were still loyal to him, and in 1797 he vigorously opposed the notion of a liturgy in the vernacular. He did not have to submit to the Concordat of 1801, for he died on 1 November 1800 without having been reconciled to the Roman Catholic Church.

=== Church of the Concordat ===
After the signing of the Concordat of 1801 with First Consul Napoleon Bonaparte, Pope Pius VII demanded the resignation of all bishops in France, in order to leave no doubt as to who was a legitimate bishop and who was a Constitutional imposter. He then immediately abolished all of the dioceses in France, for the same reason. Then he began to restore the old Ancien Régime dioceses, or most of them, though not with the same boundaries as before the Revolution. The diocese of Pamiers was not one of those revived by Pope Pius VII in his bull Qui Christi Domini of 29 November 1801. Its territory was assigned to the Archdiocese of Toulouse. Under the Concordat, however, Bonaparte exercised the same privileges as had the kings of France, especially that of nominating bishops for vacant dioceses, with the approval of the Pope. The practice continued until the Restoration in 1815, when the privilege of nomination returned to the hands of the King of France.

In accordance with the Concordat between Pope Pius VII and King Louis XVIII, signed on 11 June 1817, the diocese of Pamiers was restored bringing together territory from the ancient Diocese of Pamiers and the Diocese of Couserans, along with the larger portion of the former Diocese of Mirepoix and Diocese of Rieux, and a deanery of the former Diocese of Alet. The Concordat, however, was never ratified by the French National Assembly, which had the reputation of being more royalist than the King, and therefore, ironically, Napoleonic legislation was never removed from the legal code (as agreed in the Concordat of 1817) and the terms of the Concordat of 1817 never became state law. Louis XVIII, however, nominated François de La Tour-Landorthe on 13 January 1823, and he was approved by Pope Pius VII on 16 May 1823.

The 1905 French law on the Separation of the Churches and the State disestablished Catholicism as the religion of France, ended all state subsidies to religious organizations, cancelled all salaries and pensions paid to the French clergy, required the repayment of all loans made to churches and church organizations, and required that all property not subject to a religious foundation created since the Concordat of 1801 was to be turned over to the government. Pope Pius X protested that this was a unilateral abrogation of the Concordat of 1801. Diplomatic relations between the French Government and the Papacy were terminated.

A decree of the Holy See 11 March 1910, revived the titles of the former Sees of Couserans and Mirepoix. and annexed them to the title of the Bishop of Pamiers.

== Bishops ==
=== to 1500 ===
- Bernard Saisset, O.S.A. 1295–1311
- Pilfort de Rabastens, O.S.A. 1312–1317 (Bishop-elect)
- Jacques Fournier, O.Cist. 1317–1326, later Pope Benedict XII
- Dominique Grenier, O.P. 1326–1347
- Arnaud de Villemur, O.S.A. 1348–1350
- Guillaume de Montespan, O.S.B. 1351–1370
- Raymond d'Accone, O.E.S.A. 1371–1379
- Bertrand d’Ornésan 1380–1424 (Avignon Obedience)
- Jean de Forto 1424–1431
- Gérard de La Bricoigne 1431–1434
- Jean Mellini (Merly) 1434–1459
- Barthélemy d'Artiguelouve 1459–1467
- Paschal Dufour 1468–1487
- Pierre de Castelbajac 1487–1497
- Mathieu d’Artiguelouve 1497–1513
- Gérard Jean 1498–1501

=== 1500 to 1800 ===
- Amanieu d'Albret 1514 (Administrator)
- Charles de Gramont, O.S.A. 1514–1515 (Bishop-elect)
- Amanieu d'Albret 1515–1520 (Administrator)
- Jean Dupin (de Pinibus) 1520–1522
- Bertrand (or Bernard) de Lordat 1524?–1544
- Jean de Barbançon 1544–1556
- Robert de Pellevé 1557–1579
- Bertrand du Perron 1579–1605
- Joseph d'Esparbès de Lussan 1608–1625
- Henri de Sponde 1626–1641
- Jean de Sponde 1641–1643

[François Bosquet]
[Jacques de Montrouge]

- François de Caulet 1645–1680

Sede Vacante (1680–1693)

François d’Anglure de Bourlemont 1681
François de Camps 1685–1693

- Jean-Baptiste de Verthamon 1693–1735
- François-Barthélemy de Salignac-Fénelon 1735–1741
- Henri-Gaston de Lévis 1741–1787
- Joseph-Mathieu d'Agoult 1787–1790

Bernard Font 1791–1793 (Constitutional Bishop of Ariège; schismatic)

=== since 1800 ===
- François de La Tour-Landorthe 1823–1835
- Gervais-Marie-Joseph Ortric 1835–1845
- Guy-Louis-Jean-Marie Alouvry 1846–1856
- Jean-François-Augustin Galtier 1856–1858
- Jean-Antoine-Auguste Bélaval 1858–1881
- Pierre-Eugène Rougerie 1881–1907
- Martin-Jérôme Izart 1907–1916
- Pierre Marceillac 1916–1947
- Félix Guiller 1947–1961
- Maurice-Mathieu Louis Rigaud 1961–1968
- Henri-Lugagne Delpon 1968–1970
- Léon-Raymond Soulier 1971–1987
- Albert-Marie de Monléon, O.P. 1988–1999
- Marcel Germain Perrier 2000–2009, resigned
- Philippe Mousset 2009–2014
- Jean-Marc Eychenne 2014 – 2022)
- Benoît Gschwind, A.A. 2023 – Present

== Bibliography ==
=== Reference works ===
- Sainte-Marthe, Denis (1785). Gallia christiana, in provincias ecclesiasticas distributa; (in Latin). Vol. Tomus decimus-tertius (XIII). Paris: Johannes- Baptista Coignard. pp. 150–185.
- Eubel, Conradus, ed. (1913). Hierarchia catholica, Tomus 1 (second ed.). Münster: Libreria Regensbergiana. p. 94. (in Latin)
- Eubel, Conradus, ed. (1914). Hierarchia catholica, Tomus 2 (second ed.). Münster: Libreria Regensbergiana. p. 90.
- Eubel, Conradus, ed. (1923). Hierarchia catholica, Tomus 3 (second ed.). Münster: Libreria Regensbergiana.
- Gauchat, Patritius (Patrice) (1935). Hierarchia catholica IV (1592-1667). Münster: Libraria Regensbergiana.
- Ritzler, Remigius; Sefrin, Pirminus (1952). Hierarchia catholica medii et recentis aevi V (1667-1730). Patavii: Messagero di S. Antonio.
- Ritzler, Remigius; Sefrin, Pirminus (1958). Hierarchia catholica medii et recentis aevi VI (1730-1799). Patavii: Messagero di S. Antonio. p. 90.
- Ritzler, Remigius; Sefrin, Pirminus (1968). Hierarchia Catholica medii et recentioris aevi sive summorum pontificum, S. R. E. cardinalium, ecclesiarum antistitum series... A pontificatu Pii PP. VII (1800) usque ad pontificatum Gregorii PP. XVI (1846) (in Latin). Vol. VII. Monasterii: Libr. Regensburgiana.
- Remigius Ritzler; Pirminus Sefrin (1978). Hierarchia catholica Medii et recentioris aevi... A Pontificatu PII PP. IX (1846) usque ad Pontificatum Leonis PP. XIII (1903) (in Latin). Vol. VIII. Il Messaggero di S. Antonio.
- Pięta, Zenon (2002). Hierarchia catholica medii et recentioris aevi... A pontificatu Pii PP. X (1903) usque ad pontificatum Benedictii PP. XV (1922) (in Latin). Vol. IX. Padua: Messagero di San Antonio. ISBN 978-88-250-1000-8.

=== Studies ===
- Baby, François (1981). Histoire de Pamiers (in French). Syndicat d'Initiatives de Pamiers - Basse-Ariège.
- Doublet, Georges (1895). Un prélat janséniste F. de Caulet: réformateur des chapitres de Foix et de Pamiers (in French). Foix: Foix-Gadrat Ainé.
- Fons, Victor (1873). Evêques de Pamiers (in French). Toulouse: Douladoure.
- Jean, Armand (1891). Les évêques et les archevêques de France depuis 1682 jusqu'à 1801 (in French). Paris: A. Picard. pp. 299–303.
- Lafont de Sentenac, Louis (1902). Armorial des évêques de Pamiers (in French). Foix: typ. Pomiès.
- Lahondès, Jules de (1882). Annales de Pamiers (in French). Vol. Tome premier. Toulouse: E. Privat.
- Lahondès, Jules de (1884). Annales de Pamiers (in French). Vol. Tome second. Toulouse: E. Privat.
- Sainte-Marthe, Denis de (1785). Gallia christiana, in provincias ecclesiasticas distributa (in Latin). Vol. Tomus decimus-tertius (13) (second ed.). Paris: Johannes- Baptista Coignard. pp. 150–185, Instrumenta, pp. 87–148.
- Société bibliographique (France) (1907). L'épiscopat français depuis le Concordat jusqu'à la Séparation (1802-1905). Paris: Librairie des Saints-Pères.
- Vidal, Jean-Marie (1899). "Les comptes de l’Evêché de Pamiers sous l’évêque Raymond Dachon". In: Annales de Saint-Louis des Français (in French). Vol. 4. Rome: St. Louis-des-Français. 1899. pp. 71–121.
- Vidal, Jean-Marie (1926). Histoire des évêques de Pamiers. I. Bernard Saisset (1232-1311). Paris, Picard, 1926.
- Vidal, Jean-Marie (1932). Histoire des évêques de Pamiers. II. Quatorzième et quinzième siècles, 1312-1467. Castillon, 1932. Histoire des évêques de Pamiers. III : Schisme et hérésie au diocèse de Pamiers (1467-1626). Castillon (Ariège): Bureaux du Bulletin historique du diocèse de Pamiers, 1931. Tome V (1939). (in French)

=== For further reading ===
- Barber, Malcolm (2014). The Cathars: Dualist Heretics in Languedoc in the High Middle Ages. New York: Routledge. ISBN 978-1-317-89039-3.
- Bueno, Irene (2015). Defining Heresy: Inquisition, Theology, and Papal Policy in the Time of Jacques Fournier. Boston-Leiden: Brill. ISBN 978-90-04-30426-0.
- Duvernoy, Jean (1965). Le registre d'inquisition de Jacques Fournier, évêque de Pamiers: 1318-1325 (in French). Toulouse: Edouard Privat.
- Vidal, J. M. (1906). Le tribunal d'Inquisition de Pamiers (in French). Toulouse: E. Privat.
