= 1294 conclave =

Election of Catholic Pope Boniface VIII

Papal conclave December 1294

Dates and location
- 23–24 December 1294; Castel Nuovo, Naples

Key officials
- Dean: Gerardo Bianchi
- Camerlengo: Tommaso d'Ocra
- Protopriest: Benedetto Caetani
- Protodeacon: Matteo Rosso Orsini

Election
- Ballots: 1

Elected pope
- Benedetto Caetani; Name taken: Boniface VIII
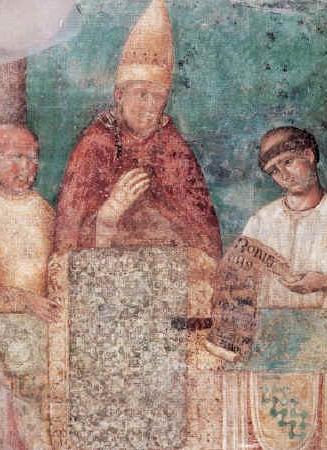

The 1294 papal conclave (23–24 December) was convoked in Naples after the resignation of Pope Celestine V on 13 December 1294. Celestine V had only months earlier restored the election procedures set forth in the papal bull Ubi periculum of Pope Gregory X, which had been suspended by Pope Adrian V in July 1276. Every papal election since then has been a papal conclave. It was the first papal conclave held during the lifetime of the preceding pontiff, an event not repeated until the 2013 papal conclave following the resignation of Pope Benedict XVI.

== Abdication of Celestine V ==
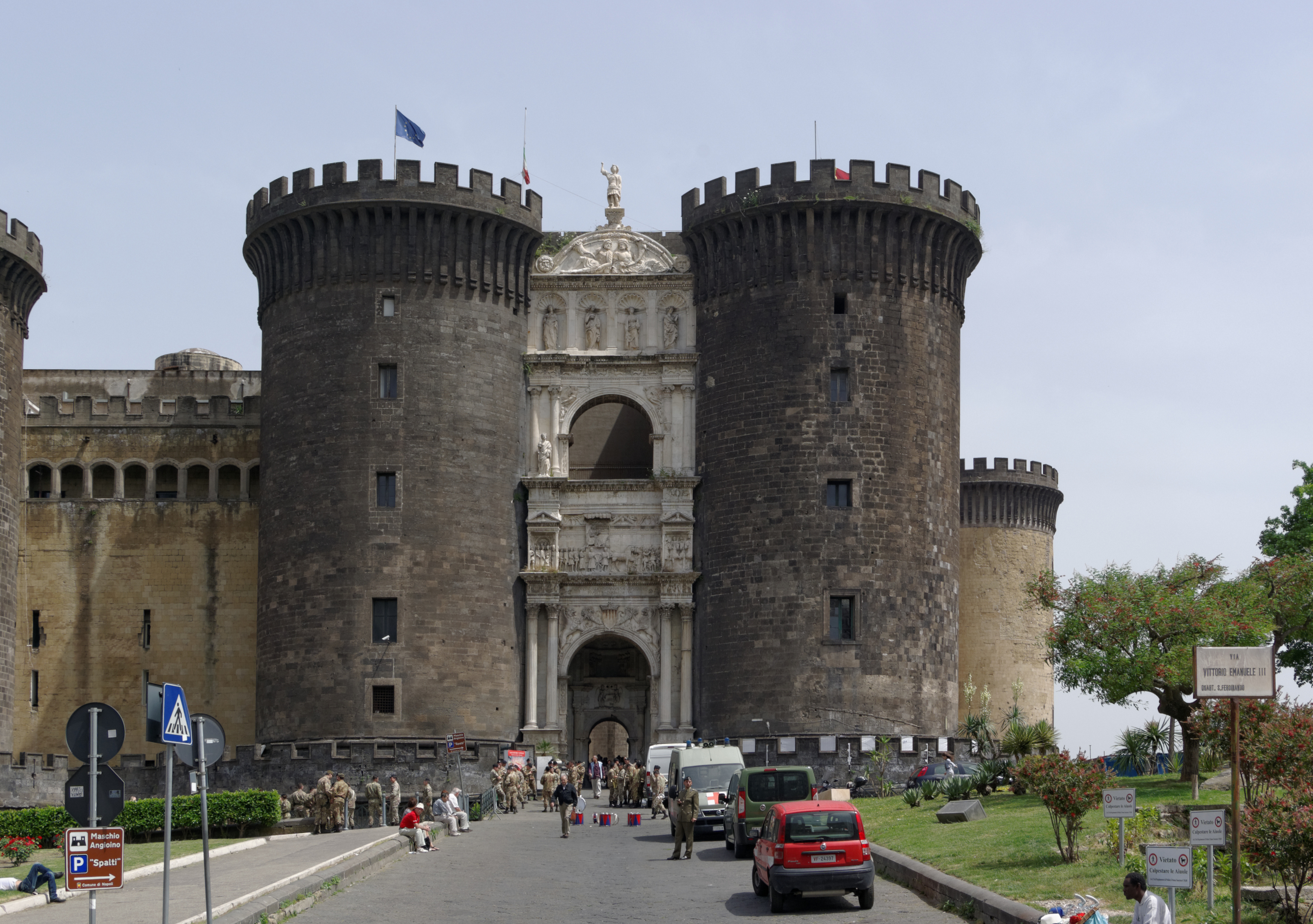
Castel Nuovo, where the conclave was held

Celestine V, founder of the Order of Celestines, widely esteemed and venerated for his holiness, was elected to the papacy on 7 July 1294, as a compromise choice after an over two-years long sede vacante. It quickly became clear that this saintly eremite was wholly incompetent and unsuited for a job as pope. Admitting his own incompetence soon after his election, Celestine expressed the wish to abdicate and return to his solitary cave in the Abruzzi Mountains. However, before doing so he issued two bulls. The first bull established the regulations concerning the abdication of a pope. The second bull (Quia in futurum, 28 September 1294) restored the constitution Ubi periculum, which established the papal conclave; the constitution had been suspended by Pope Adrian V in July 1276. During his short papacy, he also created 13 cardinals. Eventually, on 13 December 1294, Celestine V abdicated the papacy at Naples, three days after confirming the restoration of the institution of the papal conclave.

It has been widely stated that the alleged great influence of the ambitious Cardinal Benedetto Caetani and the pressure he applied on Celestine V were important factors in Celestine's decision to abdicate, but it seems nearly as certain that it was an entirely voluntarily step of the Pope, with the role of Caetani limited to participation in the solution of the legal problems connected with the resignation of a pope. In particular, there were doubts whether a pope could resign at all, and who would be authorized to accept such a resignation.

== List of participants ==
All 22 living cardinals participated in the conclave; 12 of them were created by Celestine V, five by Nicholas IV, two by Nicholas III, one by Urban IV and one by Honorius IV:

Elector	Place of birth	Cardinalatial title	Elevated	Elevator	Other ecclesiastical titles	Notes
Gerardo Bianchi	Parma	Bishop of Sabina	12 March 1278	Nicholas III	Dean of the Sacred College of Cardinals	
Giovanni Boccamazza	Rome	Bishop of Frascati	22 December 1285	Honorius IV		Nephew of Honorius IV; former archbishop of Monreale (1278—1286)
Hugh Aycelin, O.P.	Billom, France	Bishop of Ostia e Velletri	16 May 1288	Nicholas IV		
Matteo d'Acquasparta, O.F.M.	Acquasparta	Bishop of Porto e Santa Rufina	16 May 1288	Nicholas IV	Grand penitentiary	Former minister general of the Order of Franciscans (1287—1289)
Simon de Beaulieu	Château de Beaulieu, France	Bishop of Palestrina	18 September 1294	Celestine V		Former archbishop of Bourges (1281—1294)
Bérard de Got	Villandraut, France	Bishop of Albano	18 September 1294	Celestine V		Former archbishop of Lyon (1289–1294); older brother of Bertrand de Got – future Pope Clement V (1305–1314)
Benedetto Caetani	Anagni	Priest of SS. Silvestro e Martino	12 April 1281	Nicholas III	Protopriest of the Sacred College of Cardinals; Cardinal-protector of the Order of S. Guglielmo	Elected Pope Boniface VIII
Pietro Peregrosso	Milan	Priest of S. Marco	16 May 1288	Nicholas IV	Cardinal-protector of the Order of Humiliati; Camerlengo of the Sacred College of Cardinals	
Tommaso d'Ocra, O.Cel.	Ocre, Abruzzi	Priest of S. Cecilia	18 September 1294	Celestine V	Camerlengo of the Holy Roman Church (1294-1300)	
Jean Lemoine	Crécy, France	Priest of SS. Marcellino e Pietro	18 September 1294	Celestine V		
Pietro d'Aquila, O.S.B.Cas.	L'Aquila	Priest of S. Croce in Gerusalemme	18 September 1294	Celestine V		
Guillaume de Ferrières	Provence	Priest of S. Clemente	18 September 1294	Celestine V		Crown-cardinal of King Charles II of Naples
Nicolas de Nonancourt	Nonancourt, France	Priest of S. Marcello	18 September 1294	Celestine V		
Robert de Pontigny, O.Cist.	France	Priest of S. Pudenziana	18 September 1294	Celestine V		Crown-cardinal of kings Philip IV of France and Charles II of Naples; former Abbot General of his order
Simon d'Armentières, O.S.B.Clun.	France	Priest of S. Balbina	18 September 1294	Celestine V		
Giovanni Castrocoeli, O.S.B.Cas.	Castrocielo	Priest of S. Vitale	18 September 1294 (or October 1294)	Celestine V	Vice-Chancellor of the Holy Roman Church; archbishop of Benevento; administrator of the see of Sant'Agata de' Goti	
Matteo Rosso Orsini	Rome	Deacon of S. Maria in Portico	22 May 1262	Urban IV	Protodeacon of the Sacred College of Cardinals; archpriest of the patriarchal Vatican Basilica; Cardinal-protector of the Order of Franciscans	Relative of Cardinal Napoleone Orsini Frangipani and nephew of Pope Nicholas III (1277–1280); not to be confused with his grandfather, Senator Matteo Rosso Orsini (1178–1246)
Giacomo Colonna	Rome	Deacon of S. Maria in Via Lata	12 March 1278	Nicholas III	Archpriest of the patriarchal Liberian Basilica	Uncle of Cardinal Pietro Colonna
Napoleone Orsini Frangipani	Rome	Deacon of S. Adriano	16 May 1288	Nicholas IV		Relative of Cardinal Matteo Orsini Rosso and nephew of Pope Nicholas III (1277–1280)
Pietro Colonna	Rome	Deacon of S. Eustachio	16 May 1288	Nicholas IV		Nephew of Cardinal Giacomo Colonna
Landolfo Brancaccio	Naples	Deacon of S. Angelo in Pescheria	18 September 1294	Celestine V		
Guglielmo de Longhi	Bergamo	Deacon of S. Nicola in Carcere	18 September 1294	Celestine V		

== Election of Boniface VIII ==
On 23 December 1294, the cardinals assembled in the Castel Nuovo at Naples for the election of the successor of Celestine V. On the next day, Christmas Eve, Cardinal Benedetto Caetani received the required two-thirds majority and took the name of Boniface VIII. Caetani's nephew, who was an eyewitness, says that Caetani was elected after one scrutiny and an accessio: scrutinio accessioneque eligitur. Soon after his election he returned to Rome, where on 23 January 1295 he received his episcopal consecration from Cardinal Hugh Aycelin, Bishop of Ostia. (Note: Also known as Hughes of Billom, of the French province of the Dominican Order, former lector at the studium of Santa Sabina in Rome. He had been Cardinal-Bishop of the suburbicarian see of Ostia since 1294, and one role of that office was the episcopal consecration of a newly elected pope.) He was crowned by Matteo Rosso Orsini, who was prior Diaconorum of the Sacred College.

== Sources ==
- Konrad Eubel, Hierarchia Catholica Medii Aevi, volumen I, 1913
- F. Burkle-Young: notes to the papal election of 1294 (The Cardinals of the Holy Roman Church by S. Miranda)
- The Catholic Encyclopedia: Celestine V
- The Catholic Encyclopedia:Boniface VIII
