= 1292–1294 papal election =

Election of Catholic Pope Celestine V

Papal election 1292–94

Dates and location
- 5 April 1292 – 5 July 1294; Santa Maria Maggiore, Rome; Santa Maria sopra Minerva, Rome; Palazzo delle Canoniche, Perugia

Key officials
- Dean: Latino Malabranca Orsini
- Camerlengo: Pietro Peregrosso
- Protopriest: Jean Cholet; Benedetto Caetani
- Protodeacon: Matteo Rosso Orsini

Elected pope
- Pietro Angelerio; Name taken: Celestine V
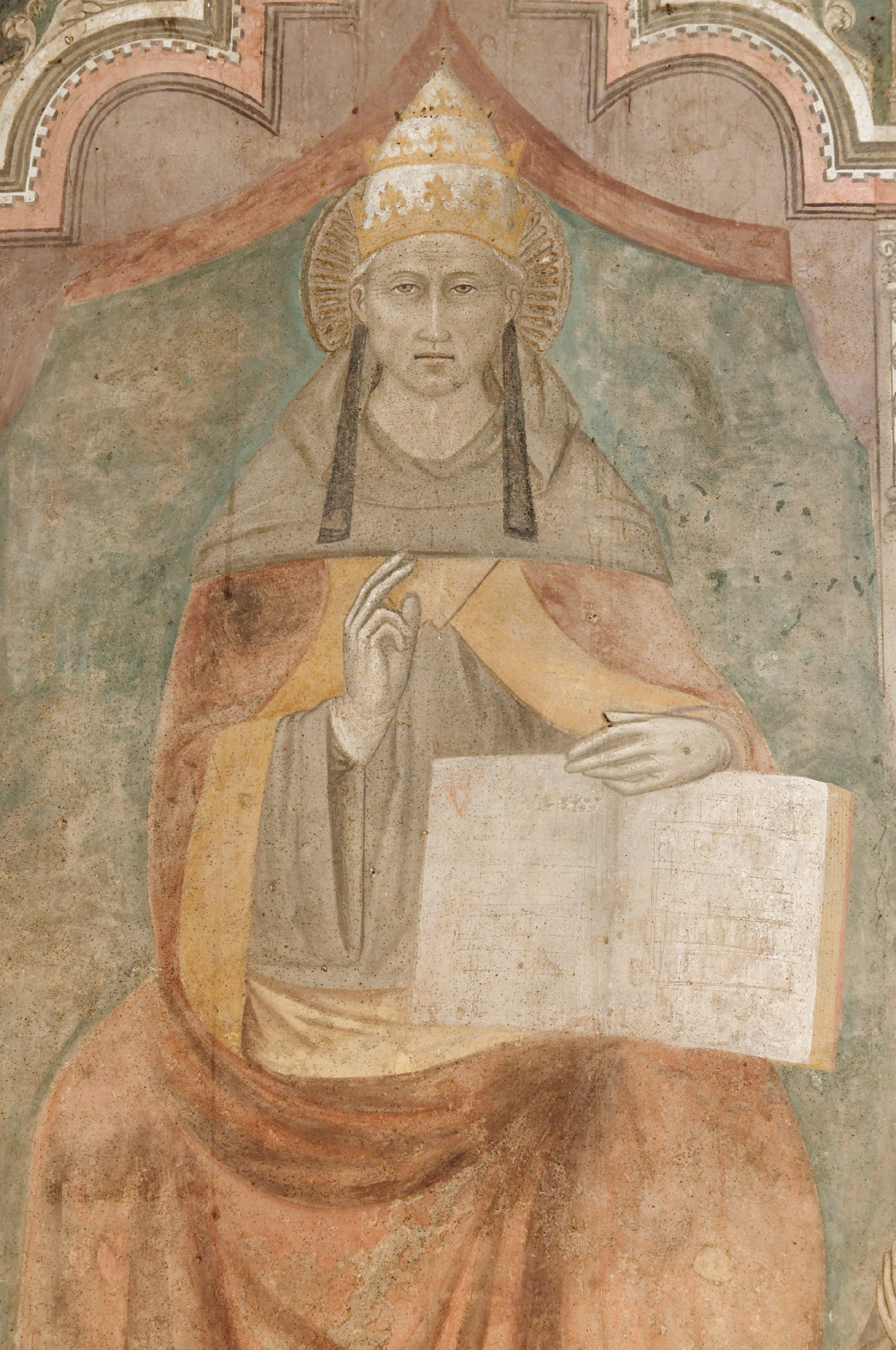

The 1292–94 papal election (from 5 April 1292 to 5 July 1294), was the last papal election which did not take the form of a papal conclave (in which the electors are locked in seclusion cum clave—Latin for "with a key"—and not permitted to leave until a new Bishop of Rome has been elected). After the death of Pope Nicholas IV on 4 April 1292, the eleven surviving cardinals (a twelfth died during the sede vacante) deliberated for more than two years before electing the third of six non-cardinals to be elected pope during the Late Middle Ages: Pietro Angelerio da Morrone, who took the name Pope Celestine V.

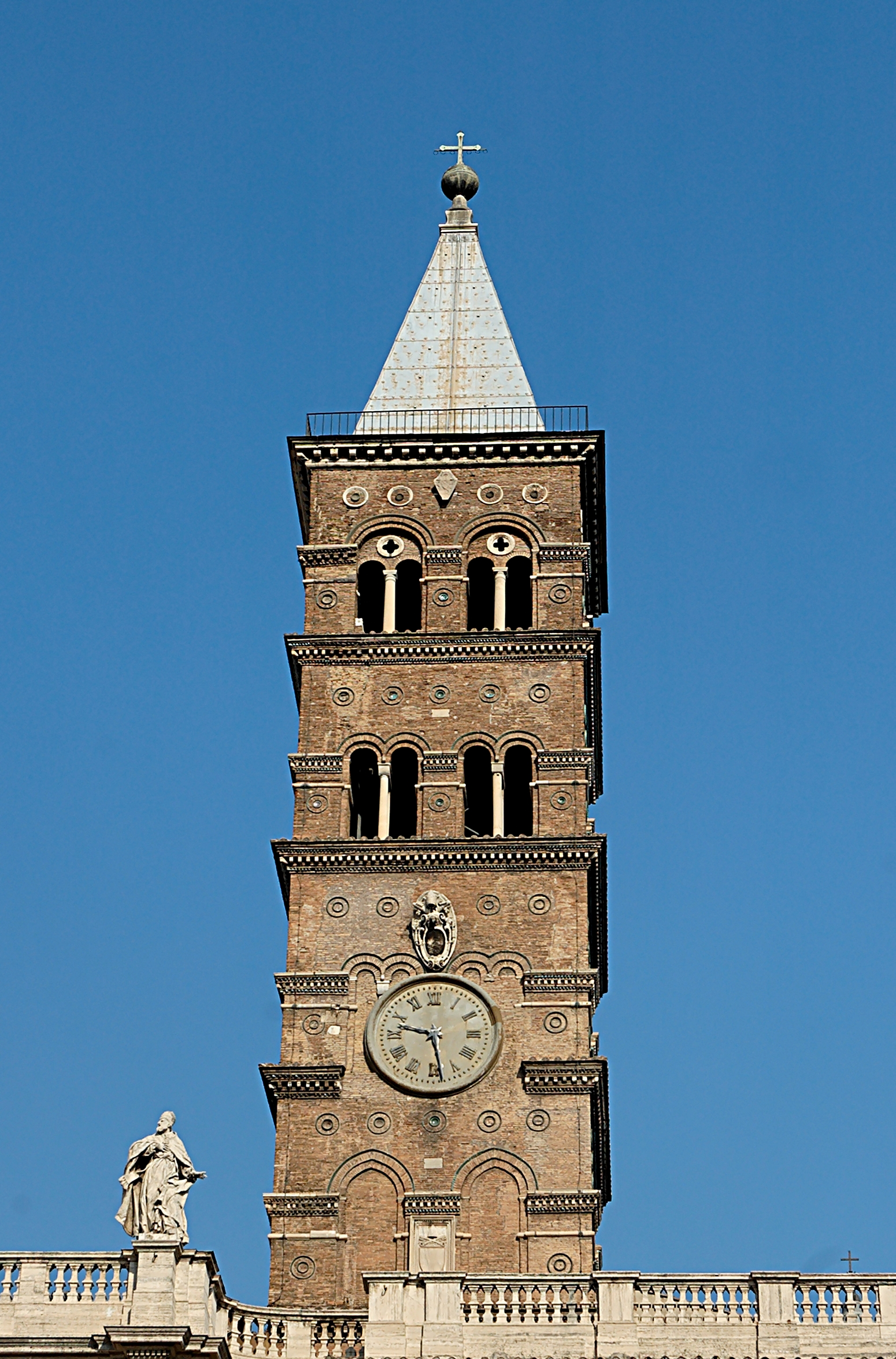
Bell tower of the Basilica di Santa Maria Maggiore, where the election began

Contemporary sources suggest that Morrone was hesitant to accept his election when word of the cardinals' decision reached his mountain-top hermitage. His ascetic life left him largely unprepared for the day-to-day responsibilities of the papacy, and he quickly fell under the influence of the Neapolitan monarchy of Charles of Anjou, to the dissatisfaction of even the pro-Angevin cardinals within the College. Celestine V resigned on 13 December 1294.

== Cardinal electors ==
Twelve cardinal electors began the election, but one—Jean Cholet—died before it was completed.

Elector	Nationality	Order	Title	Elevated	Elevator	Notes
Latino Malabranca Orsini, O.P.	Roman	Cardinal-bishop	Bishop of Ostia e Velletri	1278, March 12	Nicholas III	Dean of the Sacred College of Cardinals; Inquisitor General nephew of Nicholas III
Gerardo Bianchi	Parmesan	Cardinal-bishop	Bishop of Sabina	1278, March 12	Nicholas III	
Giovanni Boccamazza	Roman	Cardinal-bishop	Bishop of Frascati	1285, December 22	Honorius IV	Nephew of Honorius IV
Matteo d'Acquasparta, O.F.M.	Todini	Cardinal-bishop	Bishop of Porto e Santa Rufina	1288, May 16	Nicholas IV	Major Penitentiary
Jean Cholet	French	Cardinal-priest	Titulus S. Cecilia	1281, April 12	Martin IV	Protopriest; Died August 2, 1293
Benedetto Caetani	Anagnini (Catalan family)	Cardinal-priest	Titulus Ss. Silvestro e Martino ai Monti	1281, April 12	Martin IV	Protopriest after August 2, 1293; Future Pope Boniface VIII
Hugues Aycelin de Billom, O.P.	French	Cardinal-priest	Titulus S. Sabina	1288, May 16	Nicholas IV	
Pietro Peregrosso	Milanese	Cardinal-priest	Titulus S. Marco	1288, May 16	Nicholas IV	Camerlengo of the Sacred College of Cardinals
Matteo Rosso Orsini	Roman	Cardinal-deacon	Deacon of S. Maria in Portico	1262, May 22	Urban IV	Protodeacon; archpriest of the patriarchal Vatican Basilica
Giacomo Colonna	Roman	Cardinal-deacon	Deacon of S. Maria in Via Lata	1278, March 12	Nicholas III	Archpriest of the patriarchal Liberian Basilica
Napoleone Orsini	Roman	Cardinal-deacon	Deacon of S. Adriano	1288, May 16	Nicholas IV	
Pietro Colonna	Roman	Cardinal-deacon	Deacon of S. Eustachio	1288, May 16	Nicholas IV	

== Deliberation ==
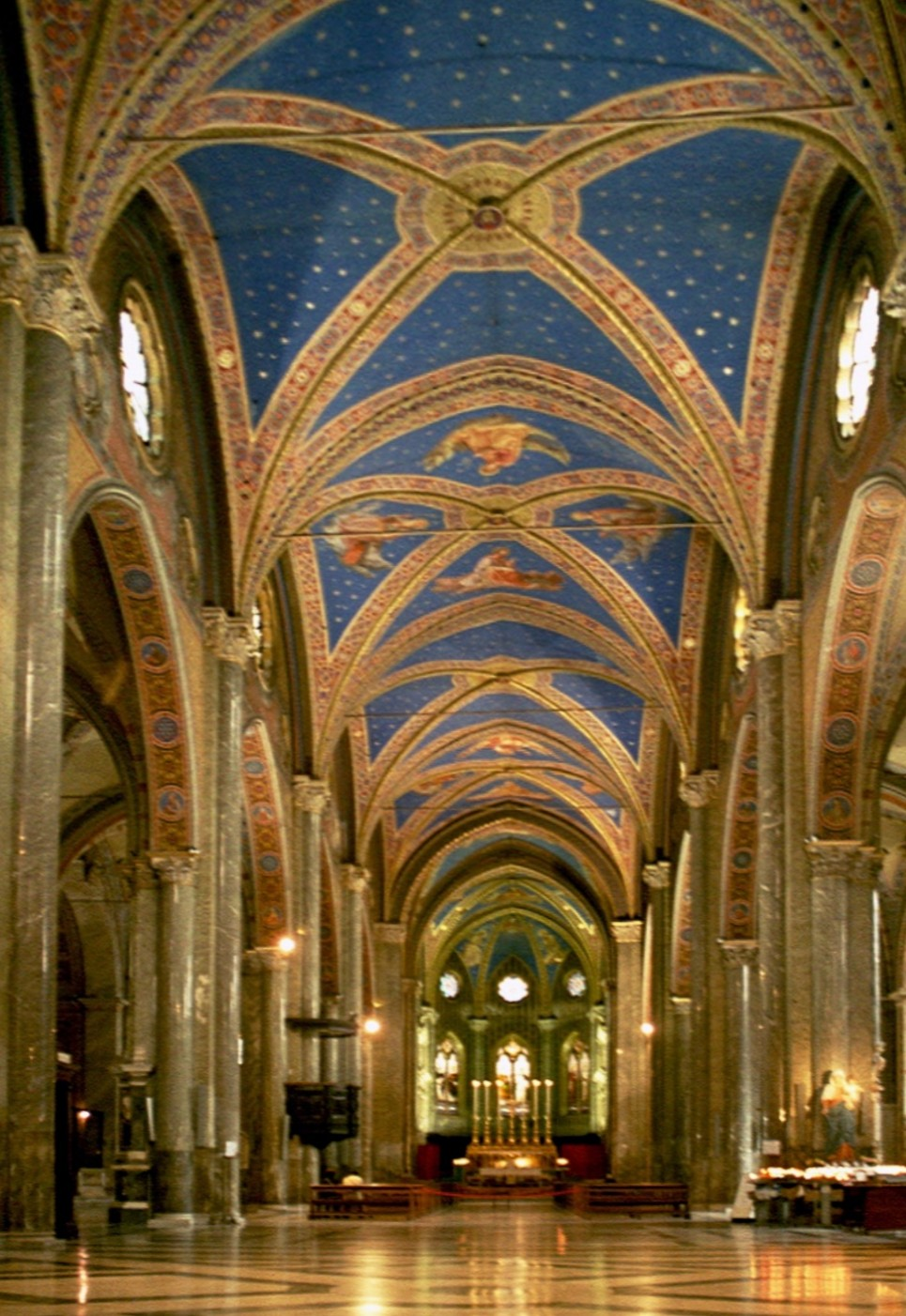
Santa Maria sopra Minerva, where the election moved

The eleven electors were relatively evenly divided between the factions of Colonna and Orsini, two powerful Roman families, led by Giacomo Colonna and Matteo Orsini, respectively. The three Orsini cardinals were pro-French and pro-Angevin, while the two Colonna cardinals supported competing Aragonese claims in Sicily. James II of Aragon had bankrolled the Colonna faction with gold, but it is unknown whether simony actually transpired.

After ten days of balloting in Rome, without any candidate approaching the requisite two-thirds, the cardinals adjourned until June and changed the location of the election from Basilica di Santa Maria Maggiore to Santa Maria sopra Minerva. After a summer epidemic in the city, and the death of Cholet in August, they dispersed until late September. The non-Roman cardinals went to Rieti (except Caetani, who went to his native Anagni) while the Roman cardinals remained in the city. As balloting continued into the next summer, the disorder in Rome increased dramatically (even by the standards of a sede vacante, during which, based on the biblical example of Barabbas, all prisoners were released). The deaths of newly elected Roman Senators Agapitus Colonna and Ursus Orsini around Easter 1293 further exacerbated the anarchy within the city, which had been marked by the destruction of palaces, the slaying of pilgrims, and the sacking of churches. After the summer of 1293, the cardinals dispersed and agreed to reconvene in Perugia on October 18.

The College continued to deliberate fruitlessly in Perugia, where they were addressed by Charles II of Naples in March 1294. By the summer of 1294, cardinals had begun to disperse, leaving only six in Perugia for their final meeting, where a letter was read aloud from a hermit, Pietro da Morrone, stating that God had revealed to him that the cardinals would be punished for any further delay. Latino Malabranca Orsini, the senior cardinal, suddenly nominated Morrone—who would have been well known by the cardinals as a saintly figure—and the other cardinals rapidly agreed and recalled the departed electors to consent.

Consensus was achieved by 5 July 1294, when Morrone was elected. As with the selection of Pope Gregory X by the papal election, 1268–1271, the choice of an outsider, non-cardinal, in this case an "octogenarian hermit," was seen as the only way to break the stalemate between the deadlocked cardinals. That election also could have resulted in the selection of a hermit, had Saint Philip Benizi not fled to avoid his election after he urged the cardinals to speed up their deliberations.

== Coronation ==
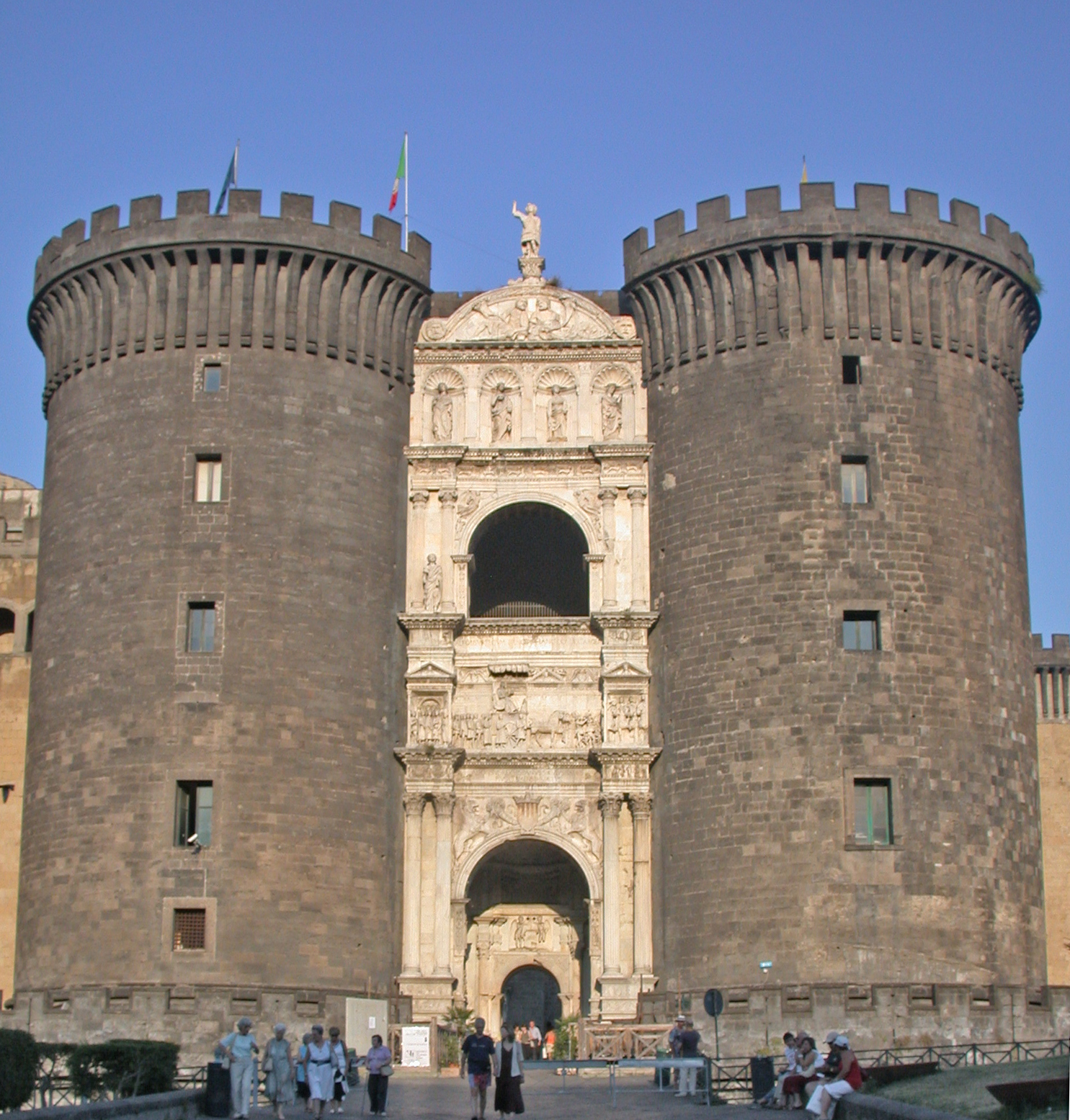
The Castel Nuovo of Naples, where Celestine V took up residence

Pietro Colonna and three bishops brought the news of Morrone's election to his mountain-top hermitage. Contemporary sources are emphatic in noting Morrone's reluctance to accept his election; for example, Petrarch recounts his attempt to flee.

Instead of coming to Perugia (the site of the election), Celestine insisted that the cardinals join him in L'Aquila (in Neapolitan territory) for his coronation, rather than crossing into the bordering Papal States. Imitating the entry of Christ into Jerusalem, Celestine rode a donkey, led by the bridle by Charles II of Naples and his son Charles Martel of Anjou to the L'Aquila basilica, which was the nearest cathedral to his hermitage. Latino Orsini died on August 10 in Perugia, but many of the other cardinals had second thoughts because of the perceived degree of Angevin control of the new pope. Because only three cardinals were present at the ceremony on August 29, it was repeated a few days later when more arrived, making Celestine the only pope to be crowned twice.

The Angevin-Neapolitan influence of Celestine was evident in his first consistory, during which he created twelve cardinals, including seven Frenchmen and three (or five) Neapolitans. This was the first time in history where a single consistory had swung the College of Cardinals so decidedly in one nationalist partisan direction. The cardinals who were not French or Angevin were members of Celestine's former order. Celestine also moved to the Castel Nuovo in Naples, where he continued to live much like a hermit until he resigned, as advocated by many Roman cardinals, including Benedetto Gaetani (who, a former lawyer, suggested that Celestine first published a decree establishing the permissibility of papal abdication). Gaetani, elected Pope Boniface VIII following Celestine's abdication, proceeded to have Celestine imprisoned while the legality of his abdication remained a prominent subject, and Celestine died a prisoner in 1296.

== Legacy ==
Before abdicating, Celestine re-enacted Ubi Periculum, the Apostolic Constitution of Pope Gregory X, which has governed all subsequent papal elections under the laws of the conclave. Two subsequent papal elections may be considered possible exceptions, although they adhered to the laws of the conclave to a great degree: the Council of Constance, which elected Pope Martin V to end the Western Schism, and the papal conclave, 1799-1800, for which Pope Pius VI suspended Ubi Periculum due to the interference of Napoléon Bonaparte.

== See also ==
- Papal election, 1268–1271, during which the procedures of the conclave largely developed (the first two of the seven intervening papal elections were conclaves)
