= Pietro Colonna =

Italian cardinal

Pietro Colonna (c. 1260 – 14 January 1326) was an Italian cardinal.

He came from the Roman aristocratic family of Colonna. Colonna was brother of Sciarra Colonna and Stephen the Older, and nephew of Cardinal Giacomo Colonna. Thanks to his uncle's protection he was appointed to the College of Cardinals on 16 May 1288, receiving from the then Pope Nicholas IV the title of cardinal-deacon S. Eustachio. He signaled the papal bulls between 3 September 1288 and 21 June 1295. Colonna received a number of beneficiaries in the diocese of Rome, among others churches. He participated in the papal election of 1292-1294 and the conclave of 1294.

In 1297, a conflict broke out between Pope Boniface VIII and the family Colonna, that was allied with the French King Philip IV of France. Boniface VIII then demanded from the Colonna the issue of their fortresses, and in the face of his refusal, on 10 May 1297, he excommunicated the leaders of the family and deposed both Colonna representatives in the College of Cardinals, Pietro and his uncle Giacomo. In response, they announced a manifest blaming Boniface VIII for the death of his predecessor Pope Celestine V and the unlawfulness of his election. The Pope then called for the crusade, ended with the destruction of Palestrina, one of the family centers.

After the death of Boniface, VIII Pietro and Giacomo were excluded from participation in the election of a successor due to the excommunications that were imposed on them. The then elected Pope Benedict XI withdrew the imposed on them church penalties, but for full rehabilitation they had to wait until the election of Pope Clement V in 1305. On 15 December 1305 Pietro was re-appointed a cardinal-deacon, though without an assigned titular church. He also assumed the function of archpriest of the Lateran Basilica. He signaled the bull of Clement V of 20 July 1307. Colonna participated in conclave 1314-1316. The then elected Pope John XXII granted him the titular church of S. Angelo in Pescheria (2 March 1317) and appointed him Archpriest of the Basilica of S. Maria Maggiore on 16 August 1318.

Pietro Colonna died in Avignon at around age 65.

== Sources ==
- Konrad Eubel, Hierarchy of Catholica Medii Aevi, vol. I, Münster 1913.
- Etienne Blauze: Vitae paparum avenionensium, I-II, edited by G. Mollat, 1914.
- Daniel Waley, http://www.treccani.it/enciclopedia/pietro-colonna_(Dizionario-Biografico)/, Alberto M. Ghisalberti (ed.): Dizionario Biografico degli Italiani, (DBI). Volume 27: Collenuccio-Confortini. Istituto della Enciclopedia Italiana, Rome 1982, p. 399-402.
- Fiorella Simoni Balis-Crema (1986). "Colonna, Pietro". Lexikon des Mittelalters, III: Codex Wintoniensis bis Erziehungs- und Bildungswesen (in German). Stuttgart and Weimar: J. B. Metzler. col. 57–58. ISBN 3-7608-8903-4.
