= Emerita Quito =

Filipino philosopher and academic (1929–2017)

- Born: September 11, 1929; San Fernando, Pampanga, Philippine Islands
- Died: September 17, 2017 (aged 88); Manila, Philippines
- Other name: Ama ng Kontemporanyong Pamimilosopiya sa Filipinas
- Education: University of Santo Tomas; University of Fribourg; University of Sorbonne
- Occupations: Philosopher, university professor

Emerita S. Quito (September 11, 1929 – September 17, 2017) was a Filipino philosopher and academic. She was the first Filipino woman to earn a PhD in philosophy. She was also the first philosopher to write a book in the Filipino language with her 1972 work Ang Pilosopiya sa Diwang Pilipinas.

She was a major leader in the effort to create a distinctly Filipino philosophy.

She was also an influential leader during the First Quarter Storm Protests.

She was named a Chevalier of the Ordre des Palmes académiques in 1984. She primarily worked at De La Salle University, where she was Distinguished Professorial Chair of Humanities from 1980 until her retirement.

== Biography ==
Quito was born on September 11, 1929, in San Fernando, Pampanga. She was the youngest of five children. She originally intended to go into law, so decided to take philosophy as her undergraduate degree at the University of Santo Tomas. However, she soon began to love philosophy, and pursued a master's degree in the same field at Santo Tomas, graduating in 1956. She left to pursue her PhD in the field in 1961, attending the University of Fribourg in Switzerland, and graduated with her PhD in 1965. Her dissertation, written in French, was on Louis Lavelle and the idea of "participatory freedom". She subsequently worked as a postdoctoral fellow at the Universitat Wien and at the Universidad de Zaragoza.

She returned to the Philippines in 1967, where she became a professor at the University of Santo Tomas. At the same time, she became less interested in the dominant philosophical tradition in the Philippines, a Scholastic philosophy rooted largely in Greco-Roman and Judeo-Christian history in Europe, with an emphasis on figures such as Saint Thomas Aquinas. She set out to create a distinctly Filipino philosophy.

She also served as an adjunct at De La Salle University, Ateneo de Manila University, and Assumption College San Lorenzo. During the First Quarter Storm, she "shook the halls of academe" with a speech on Herbert Marcuse and the Great refusal. She soon became influential among the activists, and news outlets called her "the darling of student philosophers, rebels, intellectuals, and even demonstrators". Even as class boycotts became more and more influential, the demonstrators would attend only her lessons.

She wrote articles calling for more demonstrations and even asking whether "communism should be taught in the universities?" She also helped found the National Association of College and University Professors, and in this capacity led the faculty involvement in the First Quarter Storm, where she participated in teach-ins.

She began working at De La Salle University full-time in 1971. In 1972, she wrote Ang Pilosopiya sa Diwang Pilipinas (transl. Philosophy in the Filipino Spirit), which was the first philosophy book in Filipino. She also wrote the second ever philosophy book in Filipino, Ang Kasaysaysan ng Pilosopiya (transl. The History of Philosophy), in 1974.

In 1974, she attended the University of Paris-Sorbonne, where she studied Oriental and Sanskrit philosophy. She also entered the Sisters of the Assumption convent, taking the name Mary John, but soon decided that was not her path.

She was a polyglot, and in addition to Filipino and English was fluent in French, German, Tagalog, Urdu, and Malay and proficient in Spanish.

She died of respiratory failure in Manila in the very early morning of September 17, 2017.

== Honors and legacy ==
She was named a Chevalier of the Ordre des Palmes académiques in 1984, and in 1985 she was named the most impressive educator in the Philippines.

She has been cited as the Philippines' most influential philosopher of the 20th century. She was known as the Grande Dame of Filipino philosophy.
