= Cardinals created by Celestine V =

Catholic appointments in 1294

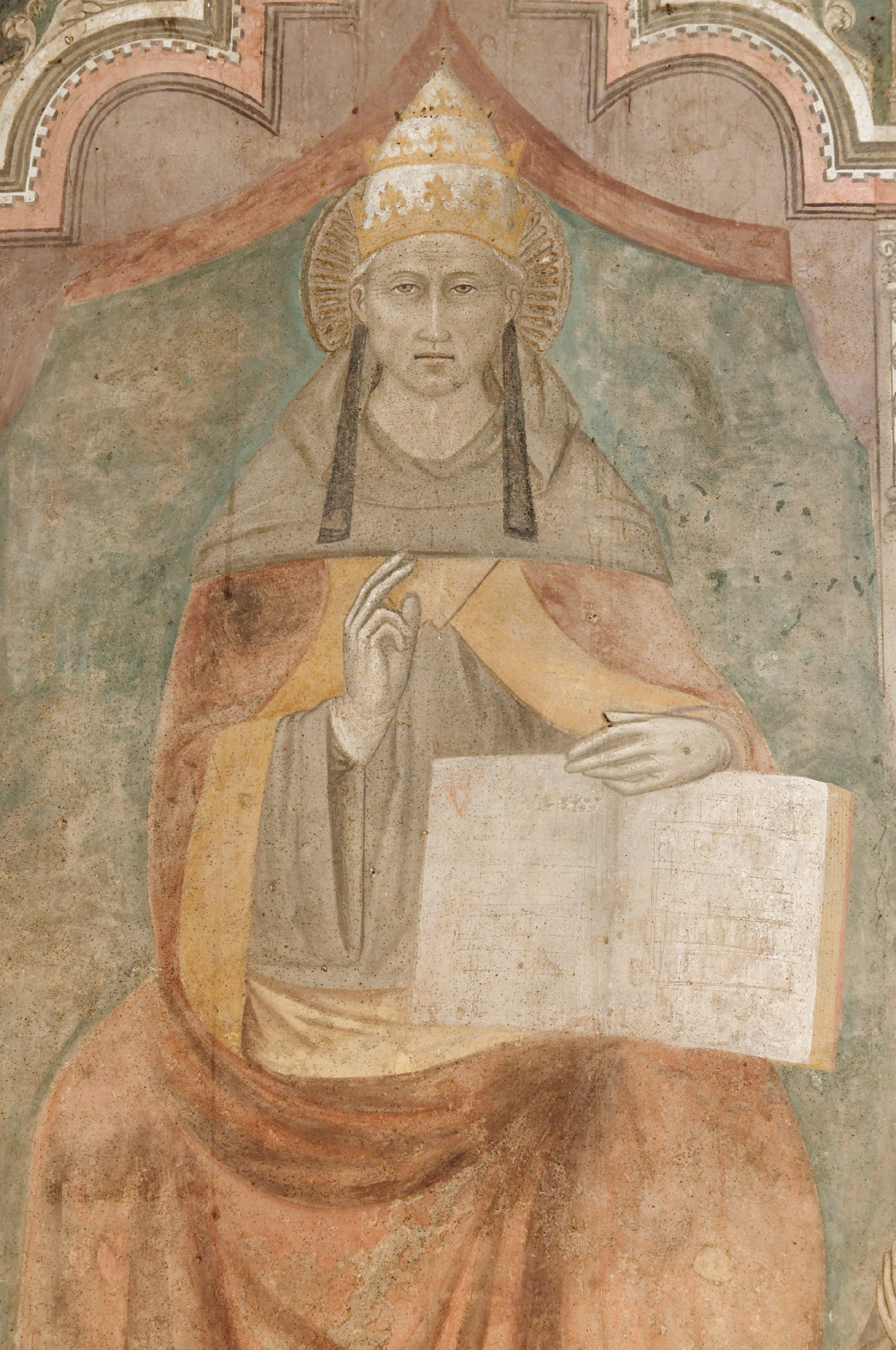
Pope Celestine V (r. 1294)

Pope Celestine V (r. 1294) created thirteen new cardinals in two consistories:

== Consistory of September 18, 1294 ==
- Simon de Beaulieu, archbishop of Bourges – Cardinal-bishop of Palestrina, † August 18, 1297
- Bérard de Got, archbishop of Lyon – Cardinal-bishop of Albano, † June 27, 1297
- Tommaso d'Ocra, O.Cel., Camerlengo of the Holy Roman Church – Cardinal-priest of S. Cecilia, † May 29, 1300
- Jean Le Moine, bishop-elect of Arras – Cardinal-priest of SS. Marcellino e Pietro, † August 22, 1313
- Pietro d'Aquila, O.S.B.Cas., bishop-elect of Valva-Sulmona – Cardinal-priest of S. Croce in Gerusalemme, † June 3, 1298
- Guillaume de Ferrières – Cardinal-priest of S. Clemente, † September 7, 1295
- Nicolas l'Aide de Nonancourt – Cardinal-priest of S. Marcello, then Cardinal-priest of S. Lorenzo in Damaso (ca. October 1294), † September 23, 1299
- Robert de Pontigny, O.Cist., abbot of Citeaux – Cardinal-priest of S. Pudenziana, † October 9, 1305
- Simon d'Armentières, O.S.B.Cluny – Cardinal-priest of S. Balbina, † 1296
- Francesco Ronci, O.Cel., abbot general of the Order of Celestines –Cardinal-priest of S. Lorenzo in Damaso, † October 13, 1294
- Landolfo Brancaccio – Cardinal-deacon of S. Angelo in Pescheria, † October 29, 1312
- Guglielmo de Longhi – Cardinal-deacon of S. Nicola in Carcere Tulliano, † April 9, 1319

== Consistory of October 1294 ==
- Giovanni Castrocoeli, O.S.B.Cas., archbishop of Benevento and Vice-Chancellor of the Holy Roman Church – Cardinal-priest of S. Vitale, † February 22, 1295

== Sources ==
- Konrad Eubel, Hierarchia Catholica Medii Aevi, vol. I, Münster 1913, pp. 11–12
- Miranda, Salvador. "Consistories for the creation of Cardinals 13th Century (1198-1303): Celestine V (1294)". The Cardinals of the Holy Roman Church. Florida International University. OCLC 53276621.
