= Guillaume de Ferrières (cardinal) =

Provençal French bureaucrat and Cardinal

Cardinal Guillaume de Ferrières
- Cardinal-Priest
- Church: San Clemente, Rome
- Predecessor: vacant
- Successor: Jacopo (Giacomo) Tomassi Caetani, O.Min.

Orders
- Created cardinal: 18 September 1294 by Pope Celestine V

Personal details
- Born: Province
- Died: 7 September 1295 Perpignan

Guillaume de Ferrières (Latin: Guilelmus de Ferrariis, de Fornariis) (born in Provence, at a date unknown; died 7 September 1295 in Perpignan) was a Provençal French bureaucrat in the service of King Charles II of Naples, and a Roman Catholic Cardinal.

Guillaume held the academic rank of Magister. He was Professor of Law at the University of Toulouse, ca. 1284.

He was Provost of the Church of Marseille, 1289-1295, and papal Chaplain. He also held the titles of Consiliarius and Familiaris of King Charles.

He was Vice-Chancellor of King Charles II of Naples, 1290-1295, in Provence. In a letter written at Aix-en-Provence on 24 November 1290, the Provost Guillaume states that he was operating with the authority of the King by virtue of a special commission.

On the request of King Charles II, Guillaume de Ferrières was created cardinal-priest by Pope Celestine V at a Consistory held at L'Aquila on 18 September 1294; Guillaume was assigned the titular Church of San Clemente in Rome.

He participated in the Conclave of 1294, following the resignation of Pope Celestine V on 13 December 1294. On 24 December, the cardinals elected Benedetto Caetani, Cardinal Priest of SS. Silvestro e Martino, who took the name Boniface VIII.

Cardinal Guillaume was appointed Legate of Boniface VIII on 30 June 1295, and sent to France to de-fuse a quarrel which was beginning between Philip IV of France, Charles II of Sicily, and Charles of Alençon and Valois. He was then sent on to Spain to confirm the peace between Charles II of Sicily and King James II of Aragon, and to carry out the investiture for the Kingdom of Valencia and the Kingdom of Aragon. Useful details of the mission are provided by the Register of Guillaume de Mandagot, Archbishop of Embrun. Mandagot had just been consecrated a bishop by Boniface VIII himself on Easter Day, 1295, and he headed north very soon thereafter. He was in Embrun in the third week of June, where he was received, installed, and offered homage. He then immediately held a synod. But he received a special order from the Pope to proceed to Catalonia, with Cardinal Guillaume de Ferrieres and King Charles II of Naples. He wound up his affairs and on 30 July set off to meet the party travelling north from Rome. The party proceeded to Catalonia, joined by the Archbishop of Arles, Rostagne de Capre. The party met with King James, and the negotiations were concluded. The agreement was later sealed by the marriage of King James II with the daughter of King Charles II, Blanche of Anjou, on 29 October or 1 November 1295, in the Catalan town of Vilabertran.

Business concluded, the party began its return journey. Cardinal Guillaume only got as far as Perpignan where he fell ill, and died on 7 September 1295. He was buried in the Franciscan church in that city. Unaware as yet of his death, Pope Boniface wrote a letter to Cardinal Guillaume on 19 September, in which he remarks on Guillaume's illness and his frustration that the negotiations with King James of Aragon were being delayed.

On 25 November 1295, the Treasury of the College of Cardinals paid out to the estate of Cardinal Guilelmus de Fornariis his share of a donation made by the Abbot of the Monastery of S. Giorgio in Venice. The estate did not, however, share in the distribution of money from the Rector of the Comtat Venaissin because Cardinal Guillaume had died before Michaelmas. The estate was still receiving distributions from money owed during Cardinal Guillaume's lifetime but not paid until well after his death; on 12 March 1296, he received money given by the Abbot of Cluny, and at Eastertide money given by the Archbishop of Tours.

== Bibliography ==
- Jean-Pierre Moret de Bourchenu, Histoire du Dauphiné et princes qui ont porté le nom de dauphins, particulièrement de ceux de la troisième race descendus des barons de la Tour du Pin Tome Second (Genève, Fabri et Barrillot, 1722), pp. 75–76.
- Antoine Albert, Histoire ecclesiastique du diocese d' Embrun Tome second (n.p, 1786), pp. 153–157.
- Jean Roy, Nouvelle histoire des cardinaux françois, ornée de leurs portraits Tome cinquième (Paris: Chez Poinçot 1788).
- Paul Maria Baumgarten, "Die Cardinalsernennungen Cälastins V. im September und Oktober 1294," (Stephan Ehses, editor) Festschrift zum elfhundertjährigen Jubiläum des deutschen Campo Santo in Rom (Freiburg im Breisgau: Herder 1897) 161-169.
- Ferdinand Gregorovius, History of the City of Rome in the Middle Ages, Volume V, second edition, revised (London: George Bell, 1906).
- J. H. Albanes and U. Chevalier (editors), Gallia christiana novissima: Marseille (Valence 1899), 771-779.
- A. Trinci, "Il collegio cardinalizio di Celestino V," Celestino V e i suoi tempi: realta spirituale e realta politica. Atti del 4° Convegno storico internazionale L'Aquila, 26-27 agosto 1989 (ed. W. Capezzali) (L'Aquila 1990), pp. 19–34.
