= Tommaso d'Ocra =

Italian monk and Roman Catholic Cardinal

Cardinal Tommaso d'Ocra
- Cardinal-Priest
- Church: Santa Cecilia in Trastevere
- Predecessor: Jean Cholet (1281-1293)
- Successor: Vacant, to 1312

Orders
- Created cardinal: 18 September 1294 by Pope Celestine V

Personal details
- Died: 29 May 1300 Naples, Kingdom of Naples
- Buried: Duomo of Naples
- Occupation: Benedictine monk and abbot

Tommaso d'Ocra, O.Celest., or Tommaso de Apruntio (born at a date unknown, in a place unknown; died 29 May 1300 in Naples) was an Italian monk and Roman Catholic Cardinal.

== Family ==
His name, d'Ocra, does not refer to his birthplace ('from Ocra') but rather to his family, members of the family of the Counts of Ocra in the Abruzzi. Ocra was also the name of the fief. The modern Italian spelling is Ocre. Tommaso had brothers named Rainaldo and Pietro, and nephews Luca, Matteo, Berardo, Bartolomeo Jacobo, (Domino) Tadeo de Barilibus and Giovanni de Rocca; he had a niece named Joannuccia, a daughter of Rainaldo; he had a sister named Gemma, and a sister named Margarita de Fossa who had several daughters, for whom the Cardinal provided money for their marriages.

== Monk and Abbot ==
Tommaso became a monk in the little congregation founded by Peter del Murrone. When Peter received papal approval from Pope Urban IV in 1264, he was required to associate his congregation with the Benedictine Order. After his death, however, the congregation was called the Celestine Order (O.Celest.). Tommaso d'Ocra became the Abbot of S. Giovanni in Piano — a community belonging to Peter del Murrone's congregation — just north-west of the city of Apricena, shortly after 1280. Abbot Tommaso is attested in a document of 1290 when his monastery received a gift from Joannes Bishop of Bojano, and he continued to hold the abbey in commendam ('as administrator') while he was Cardinal.

== Cardinal ==
Tommaso d'Ocra was created cardinal by Pope Celestine V in the Consistory of 18 September 1294, and assigned the title of the church of Santa Cecilia in Trastevere. He was named Chamberlain of the Holy Roman Church (Camerlengo) by Celestine V, and held the post until his death (1294-1300). He immediately received an annual retainer from the King of England for each of the six years that he was a cardinal.

He participated in the Conclave which met in Naples after the resignation of Pope Celestine V on 13 December 1294. The ceremonies of the Conclave began with the Mass of the Holy Spirit on 23 December. Balloting began on Christmas Eve, 24 December. There was one scrutiny, in which Cardinal Benedetto Caetani received a majority of the votes, the rest going to another candidate (possibly Cardinal Matteo Rosso Orsini; later the same day, at the Accessio, Caetani received the required two-thirds. There was, thus, only one scrutiny. Caetani took the throne name Boniface VIII. After ex-Pope Celestine V died on 19 May 1296, Pope Boniface appointed Cardinal Tommaso to oversee his burial.

His income was considerable. For the year 1295, as his share from the census alone, he received 1,000 florins, and for the year 1296 9,009 florins and 13 denarii. For the year 1297, he received 9.033 florins, 4 solidi and 4 denarii; and, for the year 1298, 3033 florins 4 solidi and 4 denarii. The income from 1299 was 2050 florins. He was not included in the distribution for 1300.

From the Comtat Venaissin his share of the income for 1295 was 83 pounds Tournois (silver), 6 solidi (sols) and 8 denarii. In 1296, he received as his share of the income from the Abbot of Cluny a total of 95 pounds Tournois, 4 sols, 9 denarii. In May 1297, when Boniface VIII deposed the two Colonna cardinals, he redistributed their income, half to himself and half to the Cardinals. Cardinal Tommaso received a payment of 8 florins, 23 solidi, and 3 denarii. On 5 September 1298, when the Papal Curia was resident at Reate, Cardinal Tommaso received 11 livres Tournois as his share of the offering sent by the Abbot of Majoris Monasterii (Marmoutiers) in Tours.

== Death ==
The Cardinal died in Naples on 29 May 1300, probably in the hospitium (guest-house) of the Monastery of S. Demetrio where he had signed his Testament on 23 May. He was buried in the Cathedral of Naples, according to his testamentary wishes.

In 1318, the successors of the late King Charles of Sicily finally paid assessments owed for many years from the census of the Kingdom of Cilicia. Cardinal Tommaso de Aquila tituli Sanctae Ceciliae presbiter, Ordinis Domini Celestinae pape, was credited with 165 gold ducats (reckoned at five ducats per ounce of gold), 156 florins, 11 solidi and 3 denarii of Tours.

== Bibliography ==
- Niccola Palma, Storia ecclesiastica e civili della regione piu settentrionale del Regno di Napoli Volume V (Teramo: Ubaldo Angeletti 1836), pp. 12–14.
- Johann Peter Kirsch, Die FInanzverwaltung des Kardinalkollegiums im XIII. und XIV. Jahrhundert (Münster 1895)
- Francesco Savini, "Il cardinal Tommaso "de Ocra o de Aprutio" e il suo testamento del 1300, Archivio storico Italiano, series V, 22 (Firenze 1898), pp. 87–92.
- Francesco Savini, La contea di Apruzio e i suoi conti (Roma: Forzani 1905), pp. 169–170.
- Paul Maria Baumgarten (1897), "Die Cardinalsernennungen Cälastins V. im September und Oktober 1294," (Stephan Ehses, editor) Festschrift zum elfhundertjährigen Jubiläum des deutschen Campo Santo in Rom (Freiburg im Breisgau: Herder 1897) 161-169.
- Paul Maria Baumgarten (1898), Untersuchungen und Urkunden über die Camera Collegii Cardinalium für die Zeit von 1295 bis 1437 (Leipzig 1898).
- Georges Digard, Les registres de Boniface VIII Tome I (Paris 1890).
- Ferdinand Gregorovius, History of the City of Rome in the Middle Ages, Volume V, second edition, revised (London: George Bell, 1906).
