= Great refusal =

Phrase from Dante's Inferno

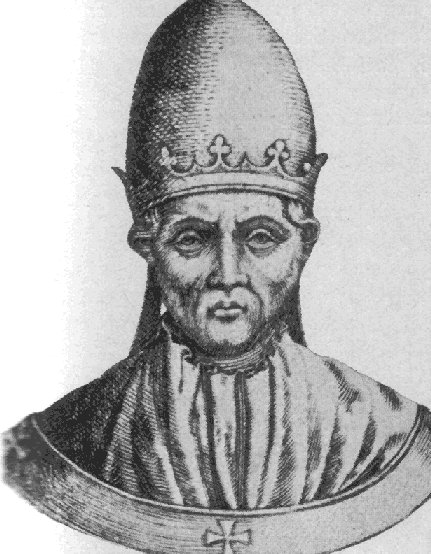
Pope Celestine V is often identified as the one to whom the "great refusal" refers.

The great refusal (Italian: il gran rifiuto) is the error attributed in Dante's Inferno to one of the souls found trapped aimlessly at the Vestibule of Hell. The phrase is usually believed to refer to Pope Celestine V and his laying down of the papacy on the grounds of age, though it is occasionally taken as referring to Esau, Diocletian, or Pontius Pilate, with some arguing that Dante would not have condemned a canonized saint. (Note: Pope Celestine V was canonized in 1313. Dante finished the Divine Comedy in 1320.) Dante may have deliberately conflated some or all of these figures in the unnamed shade.

Poscia ch'io v'ebbi alcun riconosciuto,
vidi e conobbi l'ombra di colui
che fece per viltade il gran rifiuto.

— Dante Alighieri
Translation:

After I had identified a few,
I saw and recognized the shade of him
who made, through cowardice, the great refusal.

== Theology ==
Dante's view that one could be unworthy of redemption, yet insufficiently evil for Hell, has been described by some scholars as "theologically dubious". However, behind Dante's adverse judgement of Celestine was the Thomist concept of recusatio tensionis, the unvirtuous refusal of a task that is within one's natural powers.

Petrarch disagreed with Dante's appraisal. He believed that Celestine's adoption of the contemplative life was a virtuous act. It was an early modern instance of the tension between lives of action and contemplation: the vita activa and the vita contemplativa.

== Later elaborations ==
- Critic Northrop Frye considered that "the 'gran refiuto', the voluntary surrender of one's appointed function, is a frequent source of tragedy in Shakespeare." He suggests that Lear's Division of the Kingdoms is an example of this.
- Alfred North Whitehead used the phrase great refusal for the determination not to succumb to the facticity of things as they are—to favour instead the imagination of the ideal.
- Herbert Marcuse took up Whitehead's concept to call for a refusal of the consumer society in the name of the liberating powers of art.
- Jacques Le Goff considered that "the 'hippie' movement is indicative of the permanent character—re-emerging at precise historical conjunctures—of the adepts of the gran rifiuto".
- C. P. Cavafy wrote a poem titled "Che fece .... il gran rifiuto" where he supports those who make the great refusal at personal cost because they are doing the right thing.
