= Giacomo Colonna (cardinal) =

Italian cardinal (1250–1318)

Giacomo or Jacopo Colonna (1250 – 14 August 1318) was a member of a powerful noble family in Rome, and an Italian cardinal.

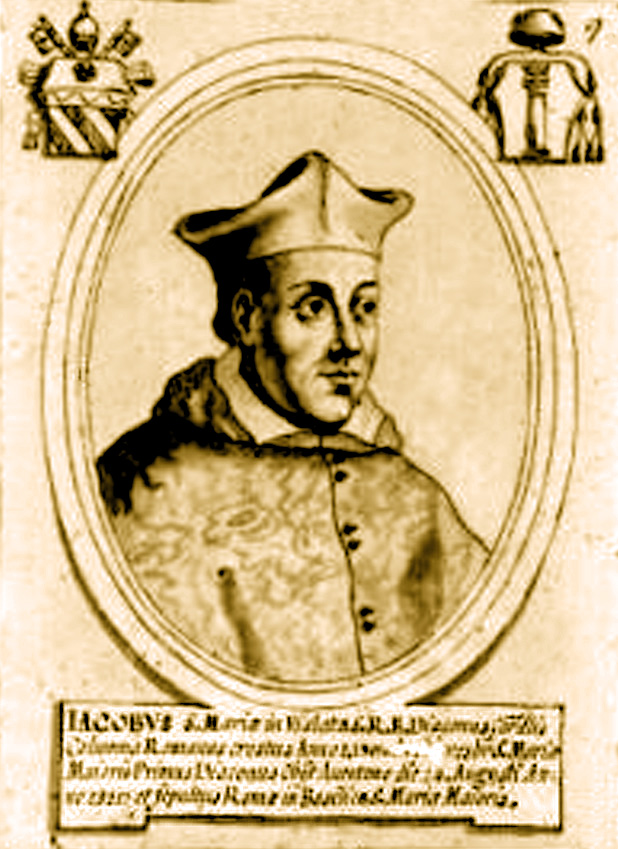
Giacomo Colonna

== Life ==
Giacomo Colonna was the second son of Oddone and Margherita Orsini Colonna, and as such, a member of two of the most powerful and influential families in Rome. He was an older brother of Blessed Margherita Colonna. His father died when he was still a boy. His mother, a pious woman, was sister to Matteo Rosso Orsini. When she died, about 1265, Giacomo and his older brother, Giovanni, looked after their younger sister.

Colonna studied law at the University of Bologna. When Margherita reached her late teens there was talk of arranging an appropriate marriage for her. However, she preferred to retire to religious life. She was initially opposed by her brother Giovanni, but supported by Giacomo.

At the consistory of 12 March 1278, his first cousin, Pope Nicholas III created him a cardinal, naming him cardinal deacon of Santa Maria in Via Lata. In 1288, Pope Nicholas IV named Giovanni's son, Pietro Colonna, a cardinal. Giacomo and Pietro opposed the election of Benedetto Caetani as Pope Boniface VIII on the grounds that they disputed the legality of Pope Celestine V's resignation.

== Conflict with Boniface ==
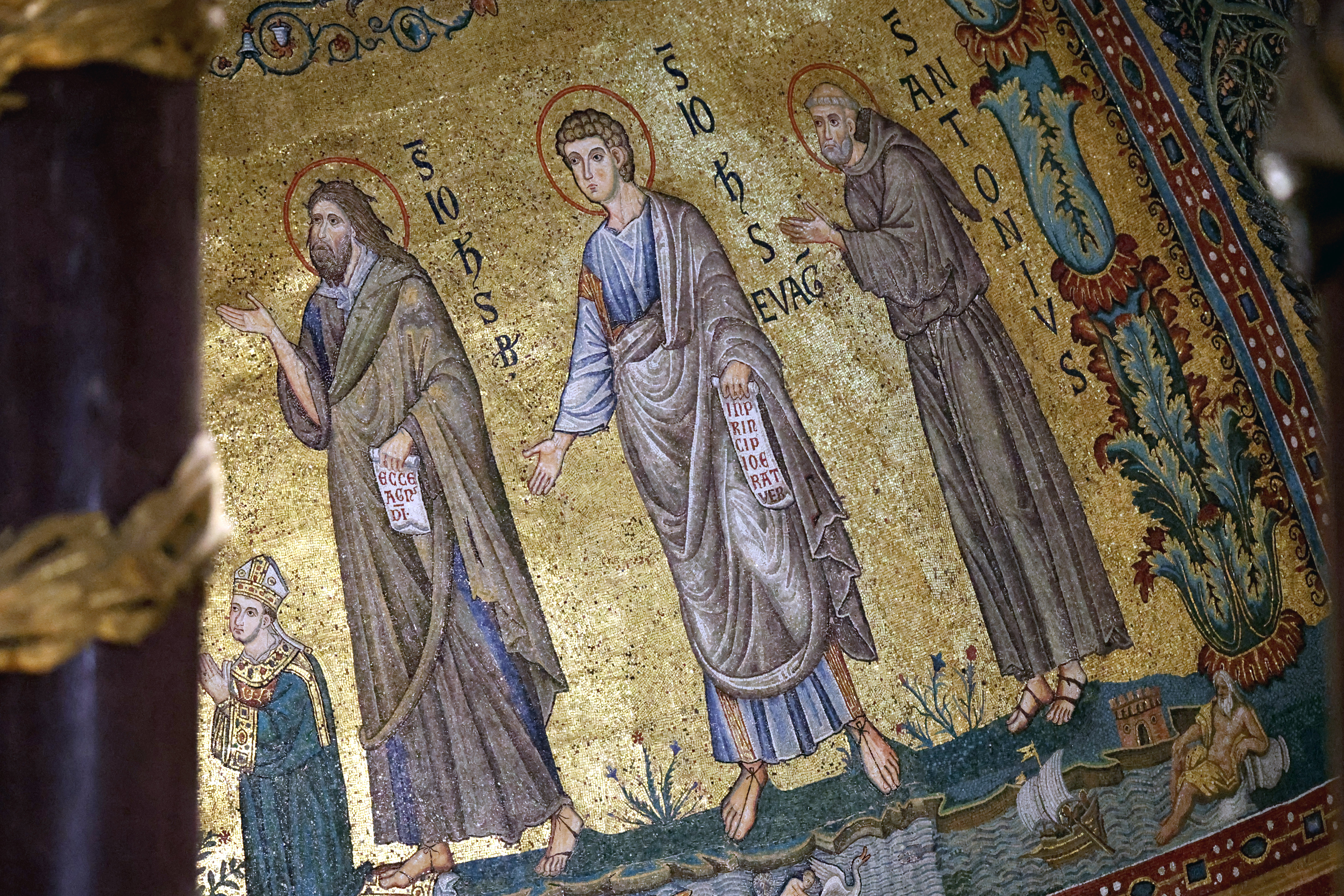
Cardinal's figure is the smallest (Santa Maria Maggiore)

In 1297 a conflict broke out between Pope Boniface VIII and the Colonna family. Cardinal Giacomo disinherited his brothers Ottone, Matteo, and Landolfo of their lands. They appealed to Pope Boniface, who ordered Giacomo to return the land, and furthermore hand over the family's strongholds of Colonna, Palestrina, and other towns to the Papacy. Giacomo refused; in May, Boniface removed him from the College of Cardinals and excommunicated him and his supporters.

The Colonna family (aside from the three brothers allied with the Pope) declared that Boniface had been elected illegally following the unprecedented abdication of Pope Celestine V. The dispute led to open warfare, and in September, Boniface appointed Landolfo to the command of his army, to put down the revolt of Landolfo's own Colonna relatives. By the end of 1298, Landolfo had captured Colonna, Palestrina and other towns, and razed them to the ground. The family's lands were distributed among Landolfo and his loyal brothers; the rest of the family fled to France.

== Reinstatement ==
After the death of Boniface VIII, Pietro and Giacomo were excluded from participation in the election of a successor due to the excommunications that were imposed on them. The then elected Pope Benedict XI withdrew the imposed church penalties, but for full rehabilitation they had to wait until the election of Pope Clement V in 1305. Giacomo set about repairing the family's reputation and fortunes. He died 14 August 1318 at Avignon.

San Giacomo degli Incurabili was established in 1349 by the Colonna family according to the terms of the will of Cardinal Pietro Colonna in honor of his uncle Giacomo.
