= Hugh Aycelin =

French Cardinal

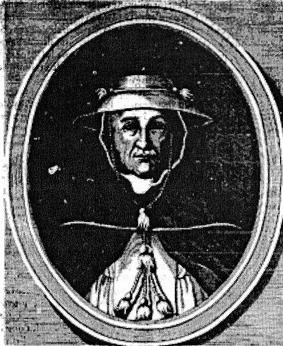
Hugh Aycelin

Hugh Aycelin (1230, Billom – 28 December 1297, Rome) was a French Cardinal. He was also known as Hughes of Billom (also Billo or Billay), Ugo Billomo, Hughes Séguin, Ugo Seguin de Billon, Hughes Aycelin de Montaigut and Hugues Séguin de Billon.

== Early life ==
Hugh was born ca. 1230 at Billom, a fiefdom of his family in the diocese of Clermont, France. His father was Pierre Aycelin seigneur of Bressolie.

== Formation ==
Hugh entered the Order of Dominicans in his youth and was ordained a priest.

== Career ==
Hugh served as a lector at the studium conventuale at Santa Sabina. He served as Master of Sacred Palace from 1281 to 1288. Pope Nicholas IV created him Cardinal-Priest of S. Sabina in the consistory of 16 May 1288. He was a signatory on papal bulls issued between 3 September 1288 and 23 August 1291.

Hugh participated in the conclave of 1292–1294, which elected Pope Celestine V.

In August 1294 he was promoted to the rank of Cardinal-Bishop of the suburbicarian see of Ostia, proper of the Dean of the Sacred College of Cardinals. He presided over the papal conclave of 1294 and consecrated bishop of Rome the new Pope Boniface VIII on 23 January 1295.

Following the instructions of his will he was buried in front of the main altar of the basilica Santa Sabina in Rome.

== Works ==
Hugh was the author of numerous works in theology and commentaries on the Book of Proverbs and the Lamentations of Jeremiah.

Catholic Church titles
Preceded by Latino Malabranca Orsini	Cardinal-bishop of Ostia; 1294–1297	Succeeded by Leonardo Patrasso
