= Pope Boniface VIII =

Head of the Catholic Church from 1294 to 1303

- Bishop of Rome
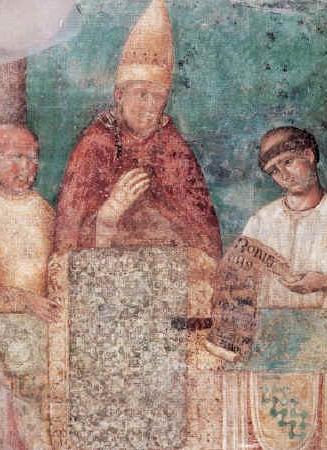
- Fresco of Boniface VIII declaring the Jubilee Year by Giotto, 1300
- Church: Catholic Church
- Papacy began: 24 December 1294
- Papacy ended: 11 October 1303
- Predecessor: Celestine V
- Successor: Benedict XI
- Previous posts: Cardinal-Deacon of San Nicola in Carcere (1281–1291); Cardinal-Priest of Santi Silvestro e Martino ai Monti (1291–1294)

Orders
- Consecration: 23 January 1295 by Hugh Aycelin
- Created cardinal: 12 April 1281 by Martin IV

Personal details
- Born: Benedetto Caetani c. 1230 Anagni, Papal States
- Died: 11 October 1303 (aged 72–73) Rome, Papal States
- Coat of arms

Pope Boniface VIII (Latin: Bonifacius PP. VIII, Italian: Bonifacio VIII; born Benedetto Caetani; c. 1230 – 11 October 1303) was head of the Catholic Church and leader of the Papal States from 24 December 1294 until his death in 1303. The Caetani family was of baronial origin with connections to the papacy. He succeeded Pope Celestine V, who had abdicated from the papal throne. Boniface spent his early pontificate abroad in diplomatic roles.

Boniface VIII put forward some of the strongest claims of any pope to temporal as well as spiritual power. He involved himself often with foreign affairs, including in France, Sicily, Italy, and the First War of Scottish Independence. These views, and his chronic intervention in temporal affairs, led to many bitter quarrels with Albert I of Germany, Philip IV of France, and later Dante Alighieri, who expected the pope to soon arrive at the eighth circle of Hell in his Divine Comedy, among the simoniacs.

Boniface systematized canon law by collecting it in a new volume, the Liber Sextus (1298), which continues to be important source material for canon lawyers. He established the first Catholic jubilee year to take place in Rome. Boniface had first entered into conflict with King Philip IV in 1296 when the latter sought to reinforce the nascent nation state by imposing taxes on the clergy and barring them from administration of the law. Boniface excommunicated Philip and all others who prevented French clergy from traveling to the Holy See, after which the king sent his troops to attack the pope's residence in Anagni on 7 September 1303 and capture him. Boniface was held for three days. He died a month afterwards.

King Philip IV pressured Pope Clement V of the Avignon Papacy into staging a posthumous trial of Boniface. He was accused of heresy, but no verdict against him was delivered.

== Life and career ==
=== Family ===
Benedetto Caetani was born in Anagni, some 50 kilometres (31 mi) southeast of Rome. He was a younger son of Roffredo Caetani (Podestà of Todi in 1274–1275), a member of a baronial family of the Papal States, the Caetani or Gaetani dell'Aquila. Through his mother, Emilia Patrasso di Guarcino, a niece of Pope Alexander IV (Rinaldo dei Conti di Segni—who was himself a nephew of Pope Gregory IX), he was not far distant from the seat of ecclesiastical power and patronage. His father's younger brother, Atenolfo, was Podestà di Orvieto.

=== Early career ===
Benedetto took his first steps into religious life when he was sent to the monastery of the Friars Minor in Velletri, where he was put under the care of his maternal uncle Fra Leonardo Patrasso. He was granted a canonry at the cathedral in the family's stronghold of Anagni, with the permission of Pope Alexander IV. The earliest record of him is as a witness to an act of Bishop Pandulf of Anagni on 16 October 1250. In 1252, when his paternal uncle Pietro Caetani became Bishop of Todi, in Umbria, Benedetto followed him to Todi and began his legal studies there.

His uncle Pietro granted him a canonry in the Cathedral of Todi in 1260. He also came into possession of the small nearby castello of Sismano, a place with twenty-one fires (hearths, families). In later years Father Vitalis, the Prior of S. Egidio de S. Gemino in Narni testified that he knew him and conversed with him in Todi and that Benedetto was in a school run by Rouchetus, a Doctor of Laws, from that city.

Benedetto never forgot his roots in Todi, later describing the city as "the dwelling place of his early youth", the city which "nourished him while still of tender years", and as a place where he "held lasting memories." Later in life he repeatedly expressed his gratitude to Anagni, Todi, and his family.

In 1264, Benedetto entered the Roman Curia, perhaps with the office of Advocatus. He served as secretary to Cardinal Simon de Brion, the future Pope Martin IV, on a mission to France. Cardinal Simon had been appointed by Pope Urban IV (Jacques Pantaléon), between 25 and 27 April 1264, to engage in negotiations with Charles of Anjou, Comte de Provence, over the Crown of Naples and Sicily. On 1 May 1264 he was given permission to appoint two or three tabelliones (secretaries) for his mission, one of whom was Benedetto.

On 26 February 1265, only eleven days after his coronation, the new pope, Pope Clement IV wrote to Cardinal Simon, telling him to break off negotiations and travel immediately to Provence, where he would receive further instructions. On the same day, Clement wrote to Charles of Anjou, informing him that the pope had 35 conditions that Charles must agree to in accepting the crown; he also wrote to Henry III of England and his son Edmund Crouchback that they had never been possessors of the Kingdom of Sicily. He also commended to the Cardinal the Sienese bankers who had been working for Urban IV to raise funds for Charles of Anjou, and that he should transfer to them some 7,000 pounds Tournois from the decima (ten percent tax) of France. On 20 March 1265, in order to expedite the business with Charles of Anjou, Cardinal Simon was authorized to provide benefices from cathedrals or otherwise within his province to five of his clerics. This may have been the occasion on which Benedetto Caetani acquired at least some of his French benefices. On 9 April 1265, on the petition of Cardinal Simon de Brion, the legation which had been assigned him by Pope Urban was declared not to have expired on the death of Urban IV. There would have been no point in making such a ruling if Cardinal Simon had already ceased to be Legate.

On 4 May 1265, Cardinal Ottobono Fieschi was appointed Apostolic Legate to England, Scotland, Wales, and Ireland by the new Pope Clement IV. In fact, he was sent as the successor of Cardinal Guy Folques, who had been elected Clement IV on 5 February 1265. On 29 August 1265, the Cardinal was received at the French Court by King Louis IX. There he learned that Simon de Montfort and his son Henry had been killed at the Battle of Evesham earlier that month. Cardinal Ottobono did not reach Boulogne until October 1265. He was accompanied by Benedetto Caetani. He was in England until July 1268, working to suppress the remnants of Simon de Montfort's barons who were still in arms against King Henry III of England. To finance their rebellion, the barons had imposed a 10% tax on church property, which the Pope wanted back because the tithe was uncanonical. This drawback was a major concern of Cardinal Ottobono and his entourage. While in England, Benedetto Caetani became rector of St. Lawrence's church in Towcester, Northamptonshire.

Upon Benedetto's return from England, there is an eight-year period in which nothing is known about his life. This period, however, included the long vacancy of the papal throne from 29 November 1268 to February 1272, when Pope Gregory X accepted the papal throne. It also includes the time span when Pope Gregory and his cardinals went to France in 1273 for the second Council of Lyon, as well as the Eighth Crusade, led by Louis IX, in 1270. The Pope and some of the cardinals began their return to Italy at the end of November 1275. Pope Gregory celebrated Christmas in Arezzo and died there on 10 January 1276. In 1276, however, Benedetto was sent to France to supervise the collection of a tithe, which is perhaps when he held the office of Advocatus in the Roman Curia, and then was appointed a papal notary in the late 1270s. During this time, Benedetto accumulated seventeen benefices, which he was permitted to keep when he was promoted. Some of these are enumerated in a bull by Pope Martin IV, in which he bestowed the deaconry of S. Nicolas in Carcere on Cardinal Benedetto Caetani.

At Orvieto, on 12 April 1281, Pope Martin IV created Benedetto Caetani cardinal deacon of Saint Nicholas in Carcere. In 1288 he was sent as Legate to Umbria to attempt to calm the strife between Guelphs and Ghibellines, which was taking the form of a war between the cities of Perugia and Foligno. In the winter of 1289, he was one of Pope Nicholas IV's advisors as he decided on a settlement of the disputes over the election or appointment of Portuguese bishops, in which King Denis played a major role. To give greater authority to the final mandate of the Pope, Cardinal Latino Orsini of Ostia, Cardinal Pietro Peregrosso of S. Marco, and Cardinal Benedetto of S. Nicola in Carcere appended their signatures and seals. Three years later, on 22 September 1291, Pope Nicholas IV (Girolamo Maschi d'Ascoli, O.Min.) promoted him to the Order of Cardinal Priests, with the title of SS. Silvester and Martin. Given the fact that there were only a dozen cardinals, Cardinal Benedetto was assigned the care (commenda) of the deaconry of S. Agata, and his old deaconry of S. Nicola in Carcere. As cardinal, he served as papal legate in diplomatic negotiations to France, Naples, Sicily, and Aragon.

=== Papal election ===
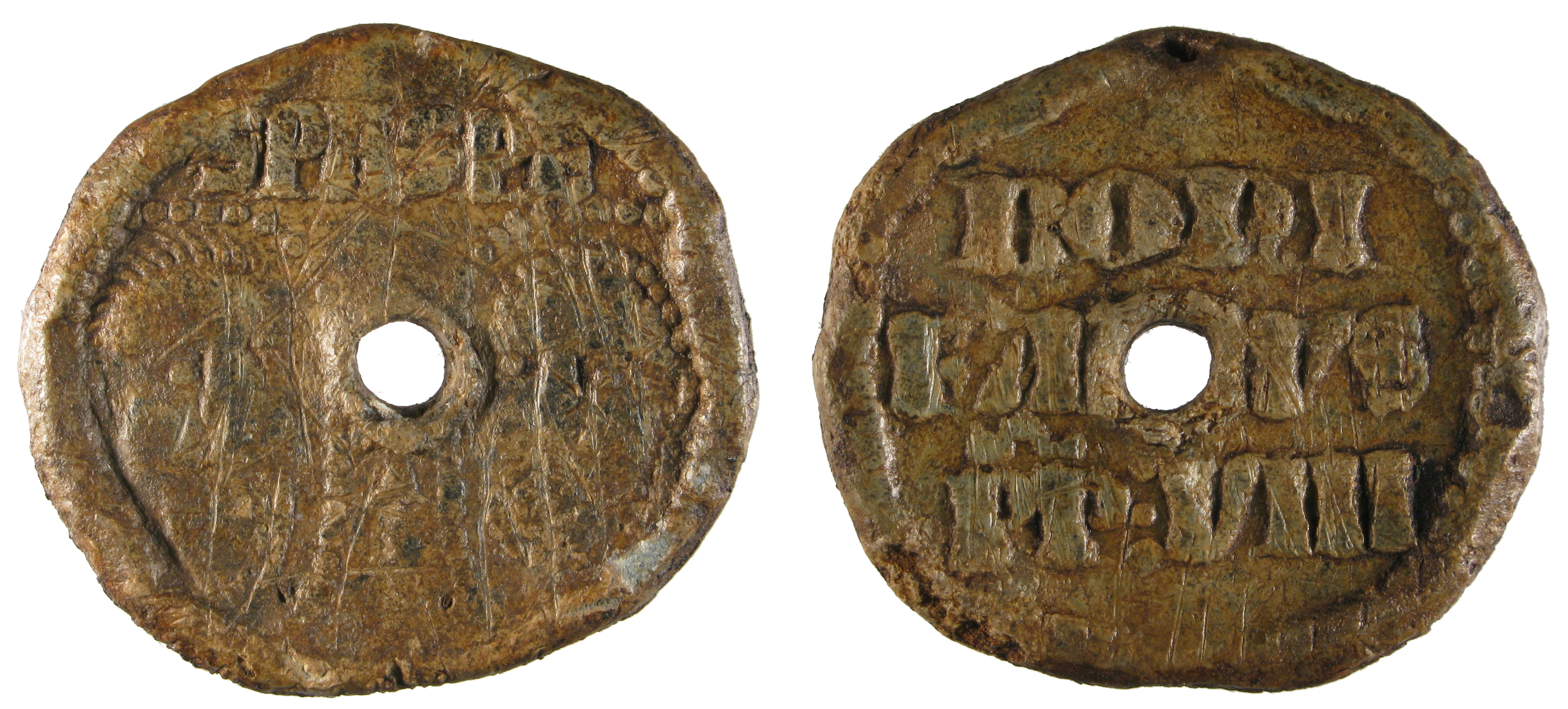
Papal bulla of Boniface VIII (pierced subsequent to original use)

Pope Celestine V (who had been Brother Peter, the hermit of Mount Murrone near Sulmone) abdicated on 13 December 1294 at Naples, where, much to the discomfort of a number of cardinals, he had established the papal court under the patronage of Charles II of Naples. He had continued to live like a monk there, even turning a room in the papal apartment into the semblance of a monastic cell. A contemporary, Bartholomew of Lucca, who was present in Naples in December 1294 and witnessed many of the events of the abdication and election, said that Benedetto Caetani was only one of several cardinals who pressured Celestine to abdicate. However, it is also on record that Celestine V abdicated by his own design after consultation with experts, and that Benedetto merely showed that it was allowed by Church law. Either way, Celestine V vacated the throne and Benedetto Caetani was elected in his place as pope, taking the name Boniface VIII.

The regulations promulgated in the 1274 papal bull Ubi periculum had not envisioned an abdication, but declared that election proceedings should begin ten days after the death of the incumbent. The 1294 papal conclave accordingly began on 23 December, ten days after Celestine's abdication. This gave all twenty-two cardinals the chance to assemble at the Castel Nuovo in Naples, the site of the abdication. Hugh Aycelin presided over the papal conclave as the senior cardinal bishop. Benedetto Caetani was elected by ballot and accession on Christmas Eve, 24 December 1294, taking the name Boniface VIII. On the first (secret) ballot, he had a majority of the votes, and at the accessio a sufficient number joined his majority to form the required two-thirds. He was consecrated bishop of Rome in Rome by Cardinal Hugh Aycelin on 23 January 1295. He immediately returned the Papal Curia to Rome, where he was crowned at the Vatican Basilica on Sunday, 23 January 1295. One of his first acts as pontiff was to imprison his predecessor in the Castle of Fumone in Ferentino, where he died on 19 May 1296 at the age of 81. In 1300, Boniface VIII formalized the custom of the Roman Jubilee, which afterwards became a source of both profit and scandal to the church. Boniface VIII founded Sapienza University of Rome in 1303.

=== Canon law ===
In the field of canon law, Boniface VIII had considerable influence. Earlier collections of canon law had been codified in the Decretales Gregorii IX, published under the authority of Pope Gregory IX in 1234, but in the succeeding sixty years, numerous legal decisions were made by one pope after another. By Boniface's time a new and expanded edition was needed. In 1298, Boniface ordered published as a sixth part (or Book) these various papal decisions, including some 88 of his own legal decisions, as well as a collection of legal principles known as the Regulæ Juris. His contribution came to be known as the Liber Sextus. This material is still of importance to canon lawyers or canonists today, to interpret and analyze the canons and other forms of ecclesiastical law properly. The "Regulae Iuris" appear at the end of the Liber Sextus (in VI°), and now published as part of the five Decretales in the Corpus Juris Canonici. They appear as simple aphorisms, such as "Regula VI: Nemo potest ad impossibile obligari." ("No one can be obliged to do the impossible.") Other systems of law also have their own Regulæ Juris, whether by the same name or something serving a similar function.

=== Cardinals ===
Boniface receiving some medical writings from Galvano da Levanto in the presence of his cardinals. Miniature from the actual presentation copy.

In 1297, Cardinal Jacopo Colonna disinherited his brothers Ottone, Matteo, and Landolfo of their lands. The latter three appealed to Pope Boniface VIII, who ordered Jacopo to return the land and furthermore to hand over the family's strongholds of Colonna, Palestrina, and other towns to the Papacy. Jacopo refused. Jacopo Colonna and his nephew, Pietro Colonna, had also seriously compromised themselves by maintaining highly questionable relations with the political enemies of the pope, James II of Aragon and Frederick III of Sicily. In May, Boniface removed them from the College of Cardinals and excommunicated them and their followers.

The Colonna family (aside from the three brothers allied with the Pope) declared that Boniface had been elected illegally following the unprecedented abdication of Pope Celestine V. The dispute led to open warfare, and in September Boniface appointed Landolfo to the command of his army to put down the revolt of Landolfo's relatives. By the end of 1298 Landolfo had captured Colonna, Palestrina and other towns and razed them to the ground after they had surrendered peacefully under Boniface's assurances that they would have been spared. Dante says it was got by treachery by "long promises and short performances" as Guido of Montefeltro counselled, but this account by the implacable Ghibelline has long since been discredited. Palestrina was razed to the ground, the plough driven through and salt strewn over its ruins. A new city—the Città Papale—later replaced it. Only the city's cathedral was spared.

To deal with the problem of the cardinals left to him by his predecessors, Boniface created new cardinals on five occasions during his reign. In the first creation, in 1295, only one cardinal was appointed, the Pope's nephew Benedetto Caetano. This was no surprise. Nor was the second creation, on 17 December 1295. Two more relatives were appointed, Francesco Caetano, the son of Boniface VIII's brother Peter; and Jacopo (Giacomo) Tomassi Caetani, OFM, a son of the Pope's sister, was made Cardinal Priest of S. Clemente. Giacomo Caetani Stefaneschi, a grand-nephew of Pope Nicholas III, was also appointed, along with Francesco Napoleone Orsini, a nephew of Pope Nicholas III. Three years later, on 4 December 1298, four new cardinals were named: Gonzalo Gudiel (Gundisalvus Rodericus Innojosa), Archbishop of Toledo, was appointed Bishop of Albano; Teodorico Ranieri, Archbishop-elect of Pisa and papal Chamberlain, became Cardinal Priest of Santa Croce in Gerusalemme; Niccolò Boccasini, OP, of Treviso, Master General of the Dominicans, became Cardinal Priest of Santa Sabina; and Riccardo Petroni of Siena, Vice-Chancellor of the Holy Roman Church, was named a Cardinal Deacon. A pattern begins to emerge, though one sees the pattern only in terms of negatives: of the ten new cardinals, only two are monks, and neither of them Benedictine (Celestine V had been excessively partial to Benedictines); and there are no Frenchmen (Celestine had named seven Frenchmen, under the influence of Charles II of Naples). Pope Boniface was distinctly changing the complexion of the membership of the Sacred College. Without the Colonnas, the influence of the King of France was greatly diminished.

On 2 March 1300, during the Great Jubilee, Boniface VIII created three more cardinals. The first was Leonardo Patrasso, Archbishop of Capua, who was Boniface VIII's uncle; he replaced the archbishop of Toledo, who had died in 1299, as Cardinal Bishop of Albano. The second was Gentile Partino, OFM, Doctor of Theology and Lector of Theology in the Roman Curia, who was made Cardinal Priest of S. Martin in montibus. The third was Luca Fieschi, of the Counts of Lavagna, of Genoa, named Cardinal Deacon of S. Maria in Via Lata (the deaconry which had once belonged to Jacopo Colonna). A relative, a Franciscan; all three Italians.

In his last Consistory for the promotion of Cardinals, on 15 December 1302, Boniface VIII named two more cardinals: Pedro Rodríguez, bishop of Burgos, Spain, became Suburbicarian Bishop of Sabina; and Giovanni Minio da Morrovalle (or da Muro), OFM, Minister General of the Franciscans, was appointed Suburbicarian Bishop of Porto. A Franciscan, a Spaniard, no Benedictines, no French. In fact, there were only two French in the Sacred College at Boniface's death, only five regular clergy (only one Benedictine).

=== Conflicts in Sicily and Italy ===
Boniface VIII put forward some of the strongest claims of any pope to temporal as well as spiritual power. He involved himself often with foreign affairs. In his Papal bull of 1302, Unam sanctam, Boniface VIII stated that since the Church is one, since the Church is necessary for salvation, and since Christ appointed Peter to lead it, it is "absolutely necessary for salvation that every human creature be subject to the Roman pontiff". These views, and his chronic intervention in "temporal" affairs, led to many bitter quarrels with Albert I of Germany, Philip IV of France, and Dante Alighieri, who wrote his treatise Monarchia to dispute Boniface's claims of papal supremacy.

When Frederick III of Sicily attained his throne after the death of his father Peter III of Aragon, Boniface tried to dissuade him from accepting the throne of Sicily. When Frederick persisted, Boniface excommunicated him in 1296, and placed the island under interdict. Neither the king nor the people were moved. The conflict continued until the Peace of Caltabellotta in 1302, which saw Pedro's son Frederick III recognized as king of Sicily while Charles II was recognized as the king of Naples. To prepare for a Crusade, Boniface ordered Venice and Genoa to sign a truce; they fought each other for three more years, and turned down his offer to mediate peace.

Boniface also placed the city of Florence under an interdict and invited the ambitious Charles, Count of Valois to enter Italy in 1300 to end the feud of the Black and White Guelphs, the poet Dante Alighieri being in the party of the Whites. Boniface's political ambitions directly affected Dante when the pope invited Count Charles to intervene in the affairs of Florence. Charles's intervention allowed the Black Guelphs to overthrow the ruling White Guelphs, whose leaders, including the poet Dante, allegedly in Rome at the time to argue Florence's case before Boniface, were sentenced to exile. Dante settled his score with Boniface in the first canticle of the Divine Comedy, the Inferno, by damning the pope, placing him within the circles of Fraud, in the bolgia (ditch) of the simoniacs. In the Inferno, Pope Nicholas III, mistaking the Poet for Boniface, is surprised to see the latter, supposing him to be ahead of his time.

=== Conflicts with Philip IV ===
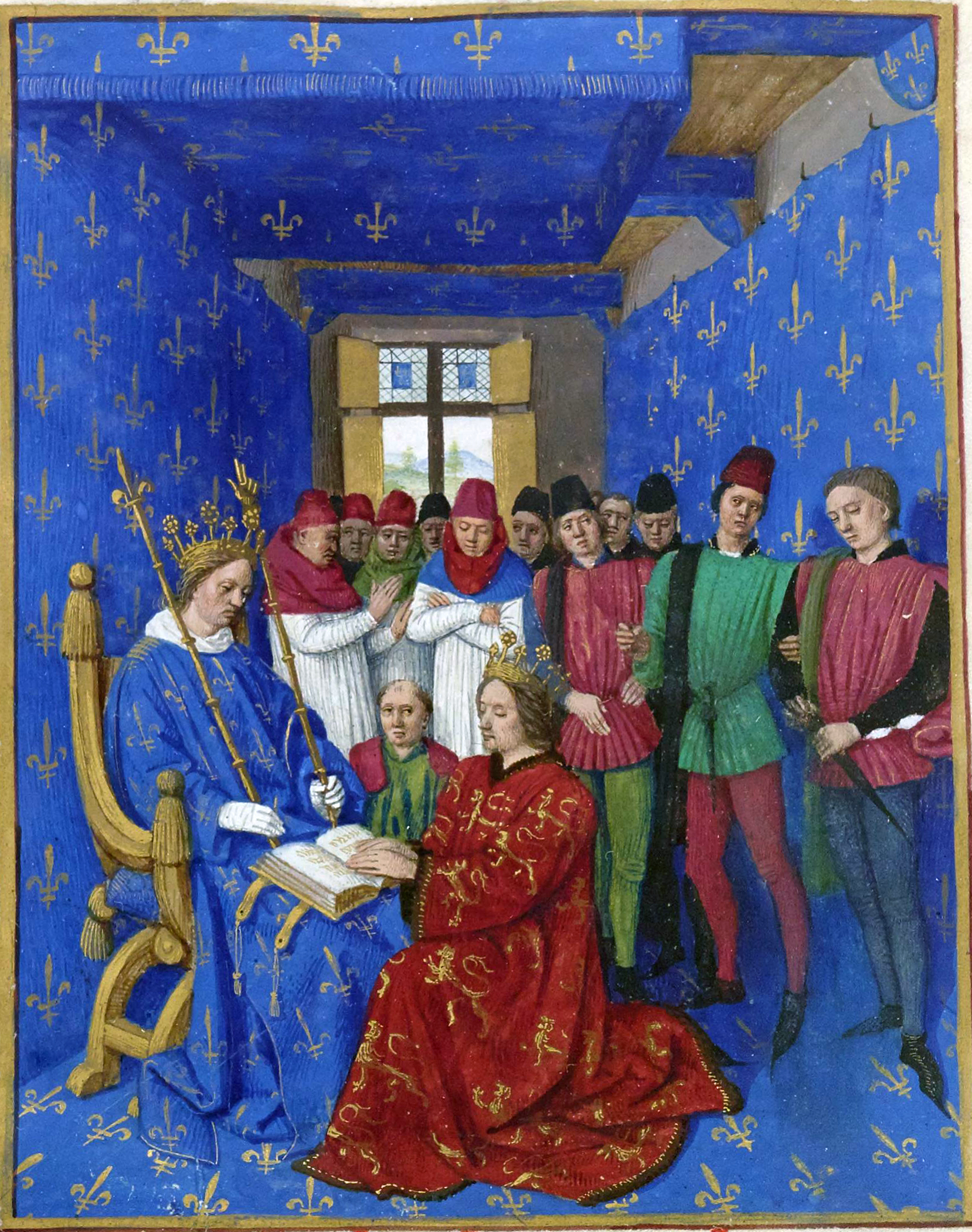
Philip IV receiving the homage of Edward I for Aquitaine

The conflict between Boniface VIII and King Philip IV of France (1268–1314) came at a time of expanding nation states and the desire for the consolidation of power by the increasingly powerful monarchs. The increase in monarchical power and its conflicts with the Church of Rome were only exacerbated by the rise to power of Philip IV in 1285. In France, the process of centralizing royal power and developing a genuine national state began with the Capetian kings. During his reign, Philip surrounded himself with the best civil lawyers and decidedly expelled the clergy from all participation in the administration of the law. With the clergy beginning to be taxed in France and England to finance their ongoing wars against each other, Boniface took a hard stand against it. He saw the taxation as an assault on traditional clerical rights and ordered the bull Clericis laicos in February 1296, forbidding lay taxation of the clergy without prior papal approval. In the bull, Boniface states "they exact and demand from the same the half, tithe, or twentieth, or any other portion or proportion of their revenues or goods; and in many ways they try to bring them into slavery, and subject them to their authority. And also whatsoever emperors, kings, or princes, dukes, earls or barons...presume to take possession of things anywhere deposited in holy buildings... should incur sentence of excommunication." It was during the issuing of Clericis laicos that hostilities between Boniface and Philip began.

At war with both his English and his Flemish vassals, Philip was convinced that the wealth of the Catholic Church in France should be used in part to support the state. He countered the papal bull by decreeing laws prohibiting the export of gold, silver, precious stones, horses, arms, or food from France to the Papal States. These measures had the effect of blocking a main source of papal revenue. Philip also banished from France the papal agents who were raising funds for a new crusade in the Middle East. In the bull Ineffabilis amor of September 1296, Boniface pledged approval of reasonable taxation for genuine emergencies but contested Philip's demands, asking him rhetorically: "What would happen to you—God forbid!—if you gravely offended the Apostolic See, and caused an alliance between Her and your enemies?." In the face of the support of French clergy such as Pierre de Mornay for Philip's general position and the need for French revenue to combat unrest in Rome from the Colonna family, Boniface retreated still further. In February 1297, the bull Romana mater ecclesia permitted voluntary clerical donations without papal approval in times of emergency as determined by the king. On 3 April 1297, seven French archbishops and forty bishops, provided this authorisation, agreed to concede to the King the fifth part of their ecclesiastical revenues under the form of two tithes, the first of which to be paid by Pentecost, the second at the end of September. This subsidy could be collected just in case the war with England should go on, with Church authority and not by means of the secular arm. By July 1297, Boniface yielded completely in the bull Etsi de statu, conceding that kings could raise taxes on church property and incomes during emergencies without prior papal approval. Philip rescinded his embargoes and even accepted Boniface's nuncios as arbitrators to delay and conclude his war with the English, with the 1303 Treaty of Paris restoring the status quo but obliging Edward to come to France in person to do homage for the return of Aquitaine.

=== First jubilee year ===
Boniface proclaimed 1300 a "jubilee" year, the first of many such jubilees to take place in Rome. He probably wanted to gather money from pilgrims to Rome as a substitute for the missing money from France, or it may be that he was seeking moral and political support against the hostile behaviour of the French king. The event was a success; Rome had never received such crowds before. It is said that on one particular day some 30,000 people were counted. Giovanni Villani estimated that some 200,000 pilgrims came to Rome. Boniface and his aides managed the affair well, food was plentiful, and it was sold at moderate prices.

=== First Scottish War of Independence ===
After King Edward I of England invaded Scotland and forced the abdication of the Scottish King John Balliol, the deposed king was released into the custody of Pope Boniface on condition that he remain at a papal residence. The hard-pressed Scottish Parliament, then in the early stages of what came to be known as First Scottish War of Independence, condemned Edward I's invasion and occupation of Scotland and appealed to the Pope to assert a feudal overlordship over the country. The Pope assented, condemning Edward's invasions and occupation of Scotland in the papal bull Scimus, Fili (Latin for "We know, my son") of 27 June 1299. The bull ordered Edward to desist from his attacks and start negotiations with the Scots. However, Edward ignored the bull; in 1301, a letter was composed in which the English rejected its authority, but it was never sent.

=== Continued feud with Philip IV ===
The feud between Boniface and Philip IV reached its peak in the early 14th century, when Philip began to launch a strong anti-papal campaign against Boniface. A quarrel arose between Philip's aides and a papal legate, Bernard Saisset. The legate was arrested on a charge of inciting an insurrection, was tried and convicted by the royal court, and committed to the custody of the archbishop of Narbonne, Giles Aycelin – one of his key ministers and allies, in 1301. In the bull Ausculta Fili ("Listen, [My] Son", December 1301) Boniface VIII appealed to Philip IV to listen modestly to the Vicar of Christ as the spiritual monarch over all earthly kings. He protested against the trial of churchmen before Philip's royal courts and the continued use of church funds for state purposes and he announced that he would summon the bishops and abbots of France to take measures "for the preservation of the liberties of the Church". When the bull was presented to Philip IV, Robert II, Count of Artois, reportedly snatched it from the hands of Boniface's emissary and flung it into the fire.

On 10 February 1302 the bull Ausculta Fili was officially burned at Paris before Philip IV and a large crowd. Nonetheless, on 4 March 1302, Pope Boniface sent cardinal Jean Lemoine as his legate to reassert papal control over the French clergy. To forestall the ecclesiastical council proposed by Boniface, Philip summoned the three estates of his realm to meet at Paris in April. At this first French Estates-General in history, all three classes – nobles, clergy, and commons – wrote separately to Rome in defence of the king and his temporal power. Some forty-five French prelates, despite Philip's prohibition, and the confiscation of their property, attended the council at Rome in October 1302.

Following that council, on 18 November 1302, Boniface issued the bull Unam sanctam ("One holy [catholic and apostolic Church]"). It declared that both spiritual and temporal power were under the pope's jurisdiction, and that kings were subordinate to the power of the Roman pontiff. The Pope also appointed Cardinal Jean le Moine as Apostolic Legate to King Philip, to attempt to find some resolution of the impasse that had developed; he was granted the specific power of absolving King Philip from excommunication.

=== Abduction and death ===
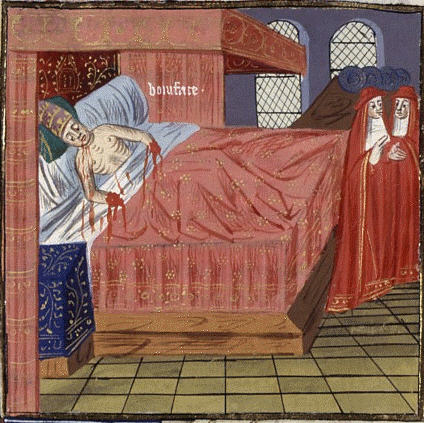
Depiction of the death of Boniface in a 15th-century manuscript of Boccaccio's De Casibus

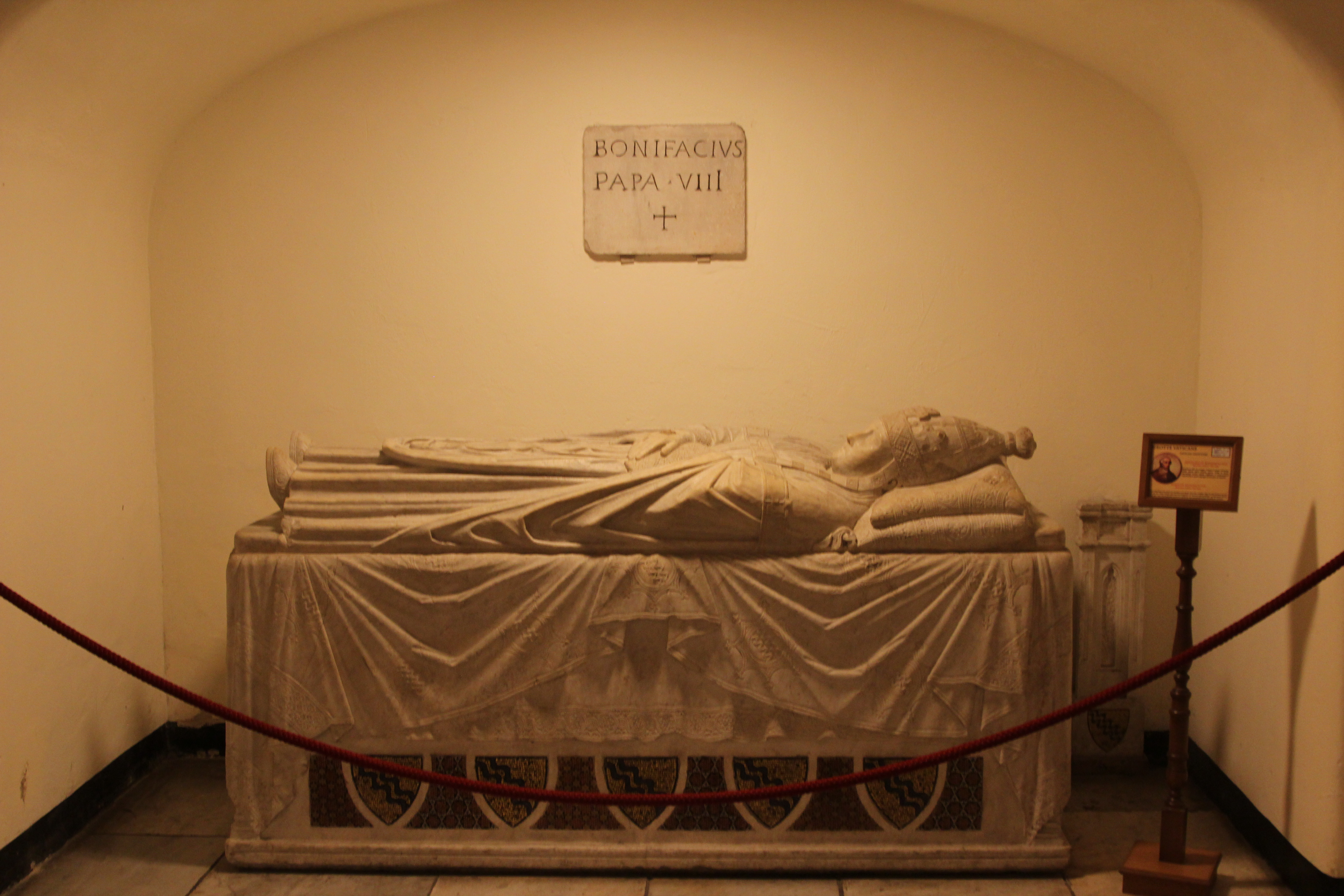
The tomb of Boniface VIII in the Vatican grotto

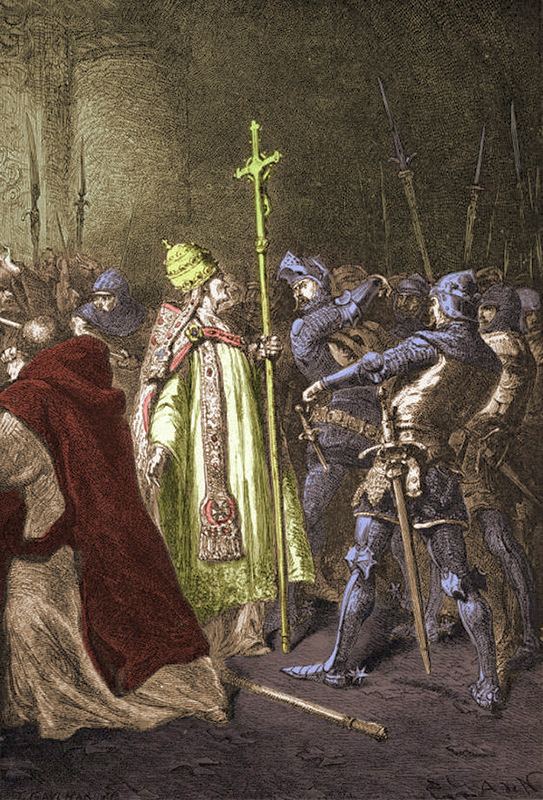
Sciarra Colonna slapping Boniface VIII, illustration by Alphonse-Marie-Adolphe de Neuville, from François Guizot's The History of France from the Earliest Times to the Year 1789 (1883).

On Maundy Thursday, 4 April 1303, the Pope again excommunicated all persons who were impeding French clerics from coming to the Holy See, "etiam si imperiali aut regali fulgeant dignitati" ("even if they shone with imperial or royal dignity"). This included King Philip IV, though not by name. In response, Guillaume de Nogaret, Philip's chief minister, denounced Boniface as a heretical criminal to the French clergy. On 15 August 1303, the Pope suspended the right of all persons in the Kingdom of France to name anyone as Regent or Doctor, including the King. And in another document of the same day, he reserved to the Holy See the provision of all present and future vacancies in cathedral churches and monasteries, until King Philip should come to the Papal Court and make explanations of his behavior. On 7 September 1303, an army led by King Philip's minister Nogaret and Sciarra Colonna attacked Boniface at his palace in Anagni next to the cathedral. The Pope responded with a bull dated 8 September 1303, in which Philip and Nogaret were excommunicated. The French Chancellor and the Colonnas demanded the Pope's abdication; Boniface VIII responded that he would "sooner die". In response, Colonna allegedly slapped Boniface, a "slap" historically remembered as the schiaffo di Anagni ("Anagni slap").

According to a modern interpreter, the 73-year-old Boniface was probably beaten and nearly executed, but was released from captivity after three days. He died a month later. The famous Florentine chronicler Giovanni Villani, wrote:

And when Sciarra and the others, his enemies, came to him, they mocked at him with vile words and arrested him and his household which had remained with him. Among others, William of Nogaret, who had conducted the negotiations for the king of France, scorned him and threatened him, saying that he would take him bound to Lyons on the Rhone, and there in a general council would cause him to be deposed and condemned.... no man dared to touch [Boniface], nor were they pleased to lay hands on him, but they left him robed under light arrest and were minded to rob the treasure of the Pope and the Church. In this pain, shame and torment, the great Pope Boniface abode prisoner among his enemies for three days.... the People of Anagni beholding their error and issuing from their blind ingratitude, suddenly rose in arms... and drove out Sciarra della Colonna and his followers, with loss to them of prisoners and slain, and freed the Pope and his household. Pope Boniface... departed immediately from Anagni with his court and came to Rome and St. Peter's to hold a council... but... the grief which had hardened in the heart of Pope Boniface, by reason of the injury which he had received, produced in him, once he had come to Rome, a strange malady so that he gnawed at himself as if he were mad, and in this state he passed from this life on the twelfth day of October in the year of Christ 1303, and in the Church of St. Peter near the entrance of the doors, in a rich chapel which was built in his lifetime, he was honorably buried.

He died of a violent fever on 11 October, in full possession of his senses and in the presence of eight cardinals and the chief members of the papal household, after receiving the sacraments and making the usual profession of faith.

=== Burial and exhumation ===
The body of Boniface VIII was buried in 1303 in a special chapel that also housed the remains of Pope Boniface IV (A.D. 608–615), which had been moved by Boniface VIII from a tomb outside the Vatican Basilica in the portico.

The body was accidentally exhumed in 1605, and the results of the excavation recorded by Giacomo Grimaldi (1568–1623), Apostolic Notary and Archivist of the Vatican Basilica, and others. The body lay within three coffins, the outermost of wood, the middle of lead, and the innermost of pine. The corporal remains were described as being "unusually tall" measuring seven palms when examined by doctors. The body was found quite intact, especially the shapely hands, thus disproving the myth that he had died in a frenzy, gnawing his hands, beating his brains out against the wall. The body wore ecclesiastical vestments common for Boniface's lifetime: long stockings covered legs and thighs, and it was garbed also with the maniple, cassock, and pontifical habit made of black silk, as well as stole, chasuble, rings, and bejeweled gloves.

After this exhumation and examination, Boniface's body was moved to the Chapel of Pope Gregory and Andrew. His body now lies in the crypt (grotte) of St. Peter's in a large marble sarcophagus, inscribed BONIFACIVS PAPA VIII.

== Posthumous trial ==
After the papacy had been removed to Avignon in 1309, Pope Clement V, under extreme pressure from King Philip IV, consented to a posthumous trial. He said, "[I]t was permissible for any persons who wanted to proceed against the memory of Boniface VIII to proceed." He gave a mandate to the Bishop of Paris, Guillaume de Baufet d'Aurillac, and to Guillaume Pierre Godin, OP, that the complainants should choose prosecutors and determine a day on which the Inquiry would begin in the presence of the Pope (coram nobis Avinione). The Pope signed his mandate at his current place of residence, the Priory of Grauselle near Malusan (Malausène) in the diocese of Vasio (Vaison), on 18 October 1309. Both the King of Aragon and the King of Castile immediately sent ambassadors to Pope Clement, complaining that scandal was being poured into the ears of the Faithful, when they heard that a Roman pontiff was being charged with a crime of heresy. Complaints also came from Italy, Germany, and the Netherlands.

On 27 April 1310, in what was certainly a peace gesture toward the French, Clement V pardoned Guillaume Nogaret for his offences committed at Anagni against Boniface VIII and the Church, for which he had been excommunicated, with the condition that Nogaret personally go to the Holy Land in the next wave of soldiers and serve there in the military. By the end of Spring 1310, Clement was feeling the embarrassment and the pressure over the material being produced by Boniface's accusers. His patience was wearing thin. He issued a mandate on 28 June 1310, in which he complained about the quality of the testimony and the corruption of the various accusers and witnesses. Then he ordered the Quaesitores that future examinations should proceed under threat of excommunication for perjury. A process (judicial investigation) against the memory of Boniface was held by an ecclesiastical consistory at Priory Groseau, near Malaucène, which held preliminary examinations in August and September 1310. and collected testimonies that alleged many heretical opinions of Boniface VIII. This included the offence of sodomy, although there is no substantive evidence for this, and it is likely that this was the standard accusation Philip made against enemies. The same charge was brought against the Templars.

Before the actual trial could be held, Clement persuaded Philip to leave the question of Boniface's guilt to the Council of Vienne, which met in 1311. On 27 April 1311, in a public Consistory, with King Philip's agents present, the Pope formally excused the King for everything that he had said against the memory of Pope Boniface, on the grounds that he was speaking with good intentions. This statement was written down and published as a bull, and the bull contained the statement that the matter would be referred by the Pope to the forthcoming Council. The Pope then announced that he was reserving the whole matter to his own judgment.

The XV Ecumenical Council, the Council of Vienne, opened on 16 October 1311, with more than 300 bishops in attendance. When the Council met (so it is said), three cardinals appeared before it and testified to the orthodoxy and morality of the dead pope. Two Catalan knights, as challengers, threw down their gauntlets to maintain his innocence by trial by combat. No one accepted the challenge, and the Council declared the matter closed. Clement's order disbanding the Order of the Knights Templar was signed at the Council of Vienne on 2 May 1312.

== Character ==
The pope is said to have been short-tempered, kicking an envoy in the face on one occasion, and on another, throwing ashes in the eyes of an archbishop who was kneeling to receive them as a blessing atop his head.

== In culture ==
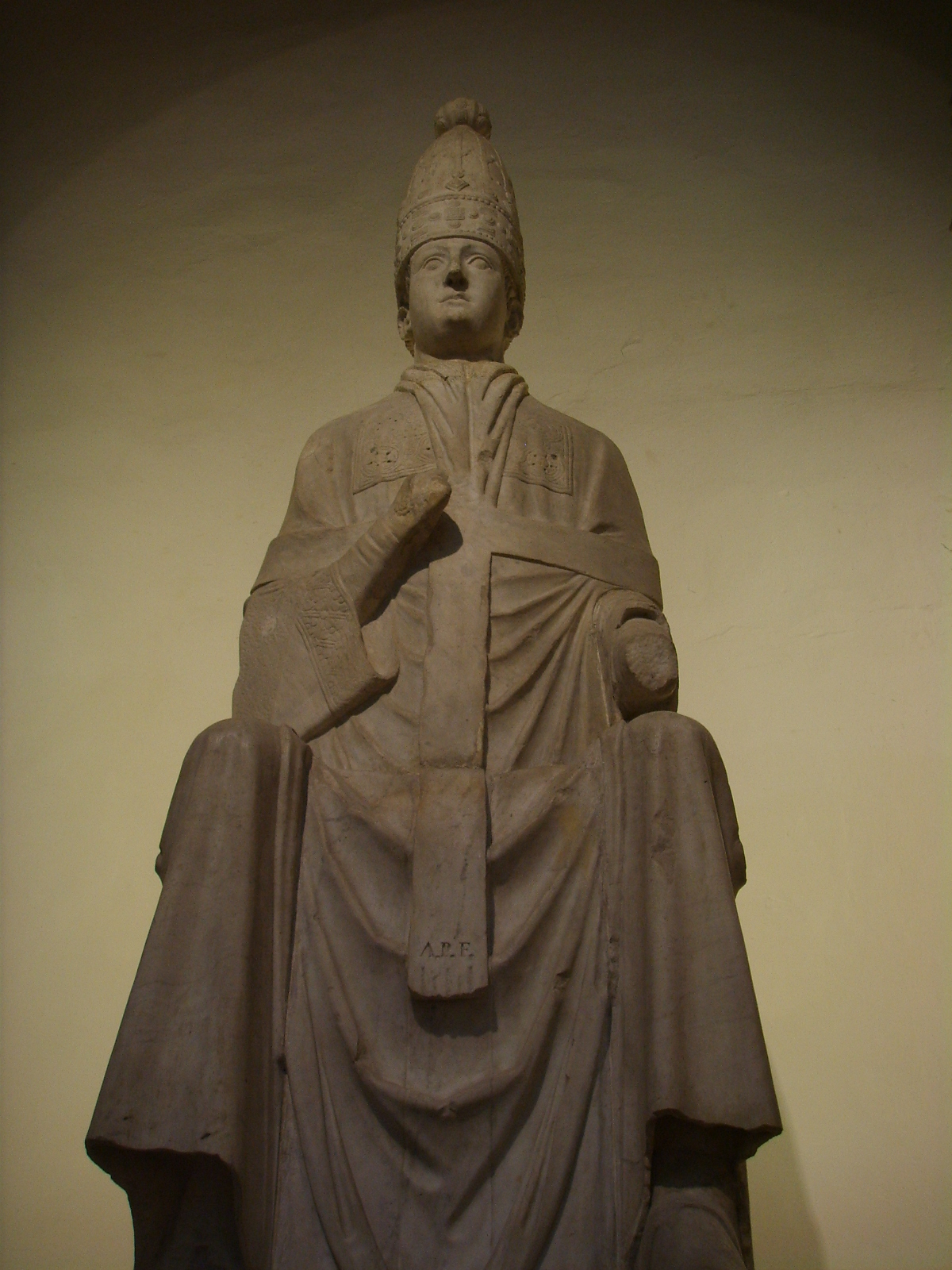
Statue of Pope Boniface VIII at the Museo dell'Opera del Duomo in Florence

- In his Inferno, Dante portrayed Boniface VIII being punished in hell for simony, even though Boniface was still alive at the date of the poem's story. Boniface's eventual destiny is revealed to Dante by Pope Nicholas III, whom he meets in the eighth circle of hell. A bit later in the Inferno, Dante recalls the pontiff's feud with the Colonna family, which led him to demolish the city of Palestrina, killing 6,000 citizens and destroying both the home of Julius Caesar and a shrine to Mary. Boniface's ultimate fate is confirmed by Beatrice when Dante visits Heaven. It is notable that he does not adopt Guillaume de Nogaret's aspersion that Boniface VIII was a 'sodomite', however, and does not assign him to that circle of hell (although simony was placed in the eighth circle of fraud, below sodomy, in the seventh circle of violence, designating it as a worse offense and taking precedence above activities of sodomy).
- He is also mentioned in François Rabelais's Gargantua and Pantagruel. In the chapter that Epistemos lists the inhabitants of hell and their occupations, he says that Boniface was (in one translation) "skimming the scum off soup pots".
- Boniface's title in the Prophecy of the Popes is "From the Blessing of the Waves".
- The mathematician and astronomer Campanus of Novara served as personal physician or perhaps only as a chaplain to Pope Boniface VIII. Campano died at Viterbo in 1296.
- In Giovanni Boccaccio's Decameron, Boniface VIII is satirically depicted granting a highwayman (Ghino di Tacco) a priorate (Day 10, second tale). Earlier (I.i), Boniface VIII is also mentioned for his role in sending Charles, Count of Valois to Florence in 1300 to end the feud between the Black and White Guelphs.
- The Tale of Pope Boniface is told in Book 2 of John Gower's Confessio Amantis as an exemplum of the sin of fraudulently supplanting others. Gower claims that Boniface tricked Pope Celestine V into abdicating by having a young cleric, pretending to be the voice of God, speak to him while he was sleeping and convince him to abdicate (ll. 2861–2900). Gower also repeats the rumour that Boniface died by gnawing off his own hands, but attributes it to hunger rather than a deliberate suicide attempt (ll. 3027–28).
- Boniface was a patron of Giotto.
- Boniface had the churches of Rome restored for the Great Jubilee of 1300, particularly St. Peter's Basilica, the Lateran Basilica, and the Basilica of Santa Maria Maggiore.
- Pope Boniface VIII is a main character played by Jim Carter in the History Channel television show Knightfall. Boniface is portrayed as a warm and avuncular man and a seasoned politician, who acts as a stabilizing, incorruptible force within a corrupt medieval world. The Knights Templar value him as their Holy leader, and they are willing to execute his orders without question. Boniface personally appoints Landry the new Master and Commander of the Paris Temple after Godfrey's assassination, and entrusts him with the mission of finding the Holy Grail, hoping to use it to launch a new Crusade to claim the Holy Land.

== See also ==
- Cardinals created by Boniface VIII
- Giovanni Villani (Florentine chronicler who made an account of Boniface and his jubilee)
- Unam sanctam
- Barons' Letter of 1301

Catholic Church titles
Preceded by Celestine V	Pope; 24 December 1294 – 11 October 1303	Succeeded by Benedict XI
