= Pope Celestine V =

Head of the Catholic Church in 1294

Pope Saint Celestine V
- Bishop of Rome
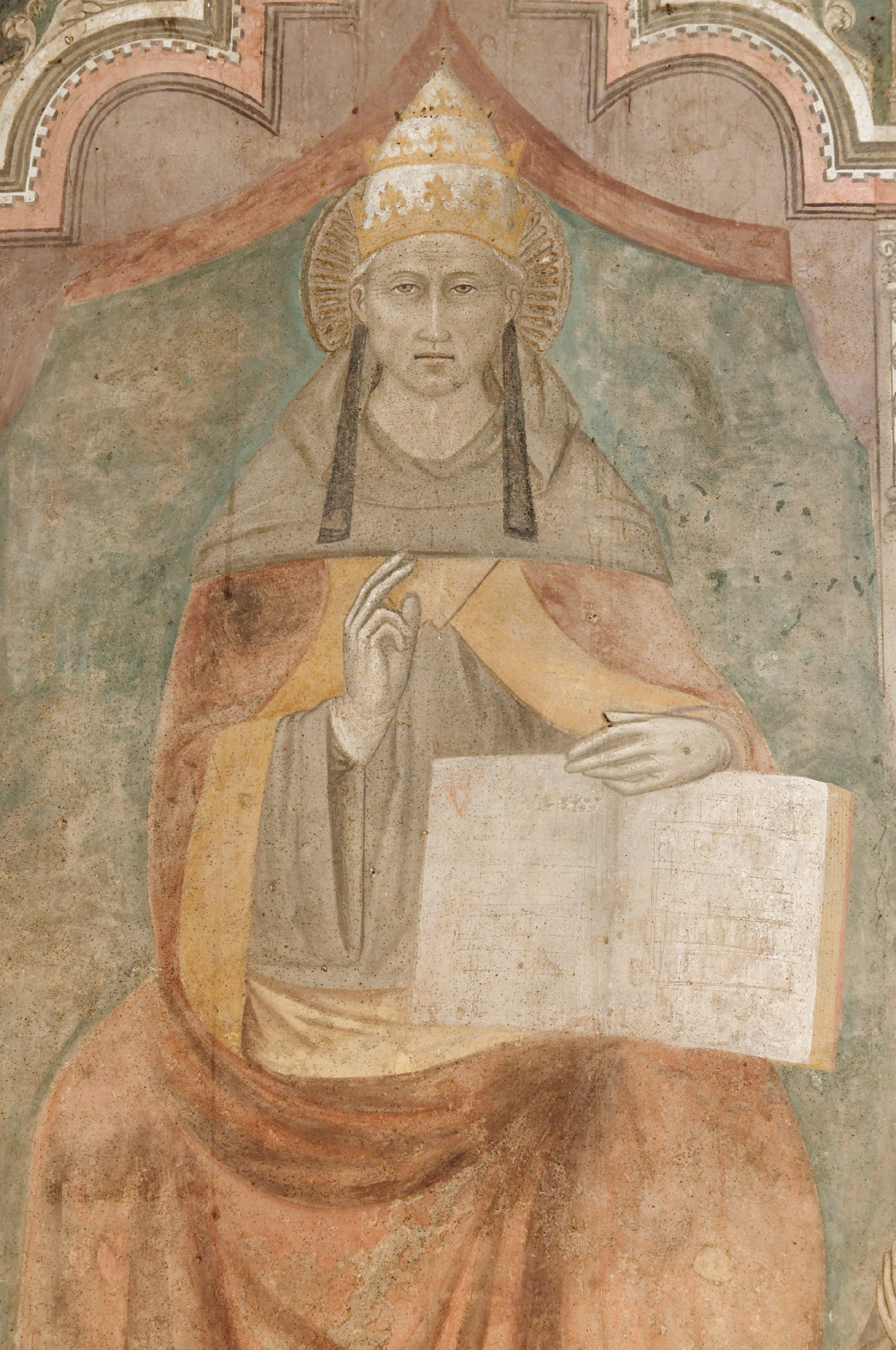
- 14th century portrait by Niccolò di Tommaso at Castel Nuovo, Naples
- Church: Catholic Church
- Papacy began: 5 July 1294
- Papacy ended: 13 December 1294
- Predecessor: Nicholas IV
- Successor: Boniface VIII
- Previous post: Superior-General of the Celestines (1274–1294)

Orders
- Consecration: 19 August 1294 by Hugh Aycelin

Personal details
- Born: Pietro Angelerio; 1209/1210 or 1215 Sant'Angelo Limosano, near Campobasso, Kingdom of Sicily
- Died: 19 May 1296 (aged 80–87) Ferentino, Papal States
- Coat of arms

Sainthood
- Feast day: 19 May
- Venerated in: Catholic Church
- Title as Saint: Confessor
- Canonized: 5 May 1313; Avignon, Papal States by Pope Clement V
- Attributes: Papal vestments, Papal tiara, Benedictine habit
- Patronage: Bookbinders, papal resignations, Aquila, Urbino, Molise, Sant'Angelo Limosano, Celestines

Pope Celestine V (Latin: Caelestinus V; 1209/1210 or 1215 – 19 May 1296), born Pietro Angelerio (according to some sources Angelario, Angelieri, Angelliero, or Angeleri), also known as Pietro da Morrone, Peter of Morrone, and Peter Celestine, was head of the Catholic Church and ruler of the Papal States for five months from 5 July to 13 December 1294, when he abdicated. He was also a monk and hermit who founded the order of the Celestines as a branch of the Benedictine order.

He was elected pope in the Catholic Church's last non-conclave papal election, ending a two-year impasse. Among the few edicts of his to remain in force is the confirmation of the right of the pope to abdicate; nearly all of his other official acts were annulled by his successor, Boniface VIII. On 13 December 1294, a week after issuing the decree, Celestine resigned, stating his desire to return to his humble, pre-papal life. He was subsequently imprisoned by Boniface in the castle of Fumone in the Lazio region, in order to prevent his potential installation as antipope. He died in prison on 19 May 1296.

Celestine was canonized on 5 May 1313 by Pope Clement V. No subsequent pope has taken the name Celestine.

== Early life ==
Pietro Angelerio was born to Angelo Angelerio and Maria Leone in the rural region of Molise, in the Kingdom of Sicily. The exact village is believed to be Sant'Angelo Limosano, now part of the province of Campobasso in Italy. His father died when Pietro was five or six, leaving him the second-youngest of seven sons to have survived infancy, of twelve total born to Maria.

Maria was particularly fond of Pietro and encouraged his spiritual development, imagining a different future for her son than becoming just a farmer or shepherd as were the local occupations. She sold some family property to hire a tutor for him, which engendered resentment and hostility from his brothers. Despite this, Pietro took to education well and quickly learned to read the psalter.

He became a Benedictine monk at the Abbey of Santa Maria di Faifoli in the Diocese of Benevento when he was 17. He showed an extraordinary disposition toward asceticism and solitude, and in the early 1230s retired to a solitary cavern on the Montagne del Morrone (thus his sobriquet "da Morrone"). He began attracting followers of his eremitic lifestyle, and gained a reputation as a miracle worker. In 1244, after a brief visit to Rome for his ordination, he left this retreat, and went with two companions to a similar cave on the even more remote Maiella mountain in the Abruzzi region of central Italy, where he continued to live as a strict ascetic according to the example of John the Baptist.

== Founding of the Celestines ==
While following an ascetic path in 1244, he founded the order subsequently named after him, the Celestines. A new religious community was formed, and in 1254 Pietro formally issued a rule formulated in accordance with his own practices, influenced by the writings of Peter Damian, a renowned reformist monk. While fundamentally Benedictine, the order also had ties to radical Franciscans, who were dismayed by the Church's increasing worldliness and political entanglements. A church was built at the foot of Morrone in 1259, and in June 1263 the new institution was formally approved by Pope Urban IV.

Having heard that it was probable that Pope Gregory X, then holding a council at Lyon, would suppress all such new orders as had been founded since the Lateran Council had commanded that such institutions should not be further multiplied, Pietro went to Lyon. There, in 1274, he succeeded in persuading Gregory to approve his new order, making it a branch of the Benedictines and following the Rule of Saint Benedict, but adding to it additional severities and privations. Gregory took it under papal protection, assured to it the possession of all property it might acquire, and endowed it with exemption from the authority of the ordinary. Nothing more was needed to ensure the rapid spread of the new association and Pietro lived to see himself as "superior-general" to thirty-six monasteries and more than six hundred monks.

In a chapter of the order held in 1293, the original monastery at Maiella being judged to be too desolate and exposed to too rigorous a climate, it was decided that the Abbey of the Holy Spirit in the plains near Sulmona should be the headquarters of the order and the residence of the general-superior, as it continued to be until the order was extinguished in the 18th century. Pietro took up residence in a cliffside hermitage overlooking the new monastery, but he would not remain undisturbed there for long.

== Election as pope ==
The cardinals assembled at Perugia after the death of Pope Nicholas IV in April 1292. After more than two years, a consensus had still not been reached. Pietro, well known to the cardinals as a Benedictine hermit, sent the cardinals a letter warning them that divine vengeance would fall upon them if they did not quickly elect a pope. Latino Malabranca, the aged and ill Dean of the College of Cardinals cried out, "In the name of the Father, the Son, and the Holy Spirit, I elect brother Pietro da Morrone!" The cardinals promptly ratified Malabranca's desperate decision. When sent for, Pietro obstinately refused to accept the papacy, and even, as Petrarch says, tried to flee, until he was finally persuaded by a deputation of cardinals accompanied by the king of Naples and the pretender to the throne of Hungary. Elected on 5 July 1294, he was crowned at Santa Maria di Collemaggio in the city of Aquila in the Abruzzo on 29 August, taking the name Celestine V.

== Papacy ==
Shortly after assuming office, Celestine issued a papal bull granting a rare plenary indulgence to all pilgrims visiting Santa Maria di Collemaggio through its holy door on the anniversary of his papal coronation. The Celestinian forgiveness (Perdonanza Celestiniana) festival is celebrated in L'Aquila every 28–29 August in commemoration of this event.

With no political experience, Celestine proved to be an especially weak and ineffectual pope. He held his office in the Kingdom of Naples, out of contact with the Roman Curia and under the complete power of King Charles II. He appointed the king's favorites to Church offices, sometimes several to the same office. One of these was Louis of Toulouse, whom Celestine ordered given clerical tonsure and minor orders, although this was not carried out. He renewed a decree of Pope Gregory X that had established stringent rules for papal conclaves after a similarly prolonged election. In one decree, he appointed three cardinals to govern the Church during Advent while he fasted, which was again refused.

Realizing his lack of authority and personal incompatibility with papal duties, he consulted with Cardinal Benedetto Caetani (his eventual successor) about the possibility of resignation. This resulted in one final decree declaring the right of resignation. He promptly exercised this right, resigning on 13 December 1294, after five months and eight days as pope. In the formal instrument of renunciation, he cited his reasons for resigning as "The desire for humility, for a purer life, for a stainless conscience, the deficiencies of his own physical strength, his ignorance, the perverseness of the people, his longing for the tranquility of his former life". Having divested himself of every outward symbol of papal dignity, he slipped away from Naples and attempted to retire to his old life of solitude.

The next pope to resign of his own accord was Gregory XII in 1415 (to help end the Western Schism), followed by Benedict XVI in 2013, 719 years later.

== Retirement, death, and canonization ==
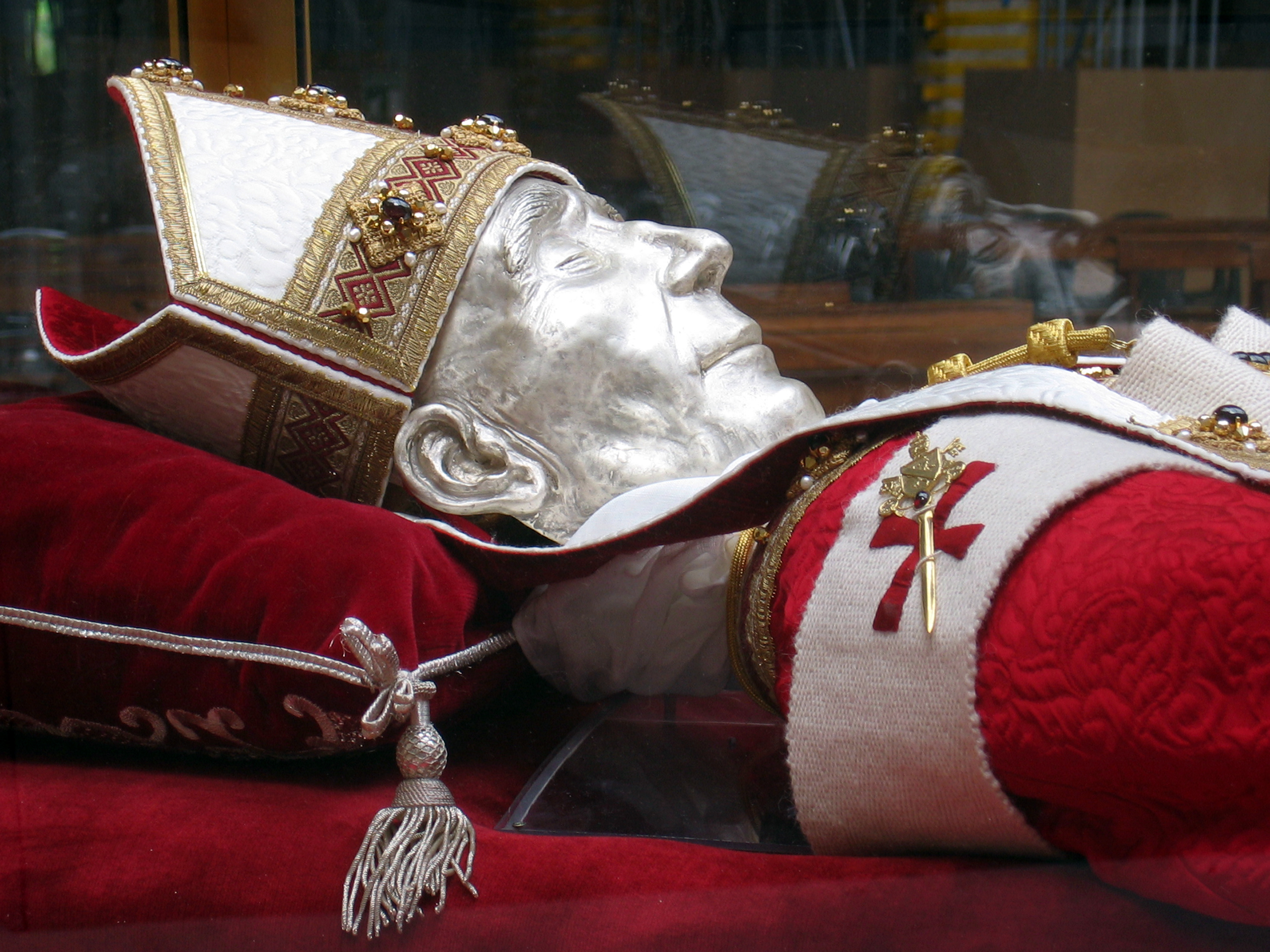
Tomb of Celestine V

The former Celestine, now reverted to Pietro Angelerio, was not allowed to become a hermit once again. Various parties had opposed his resignation and the new Pope Boniface VIII had reason to worry that one of them might install him as an antipope. To prevent this, he ordered Pietro to accompany him to Rome. Pietro escaped and hid in the woods before attempting to return to Sulmona to resume monastic life. This proved impossible, and Pietro was captured after an attempt to flee to Dalmatia was thwarted when a tempest forced his ship to return to port. Boniface imprisoned him in the castle of Fumone near Ferentino in Lazio, attended by two monks of his order, where Pietro died after 10 months at about the age of 81. His supporters spread the allegation that Boniface had treated him harshly and ultimately executed Pietro, but there is no clear historical evidence of this. Pietro was buried at Ferentino, but his body was subsequently moved to the Basilica of Santa Maria di Collemaggio in L'Aquila.

Philip IV of France, who had supported Celestine and bitterly opposed Boniface, nominated Celestine for sainthood following the election of Pope Clement V. The latter signed a decree of dispensation on 13 May 1306 to investigate the nomination. He was canonized on 5 May 1313 after a consistory in which Boniface's Caetani family was outvoted by members of the rival Colonna family.

== Legacy ==
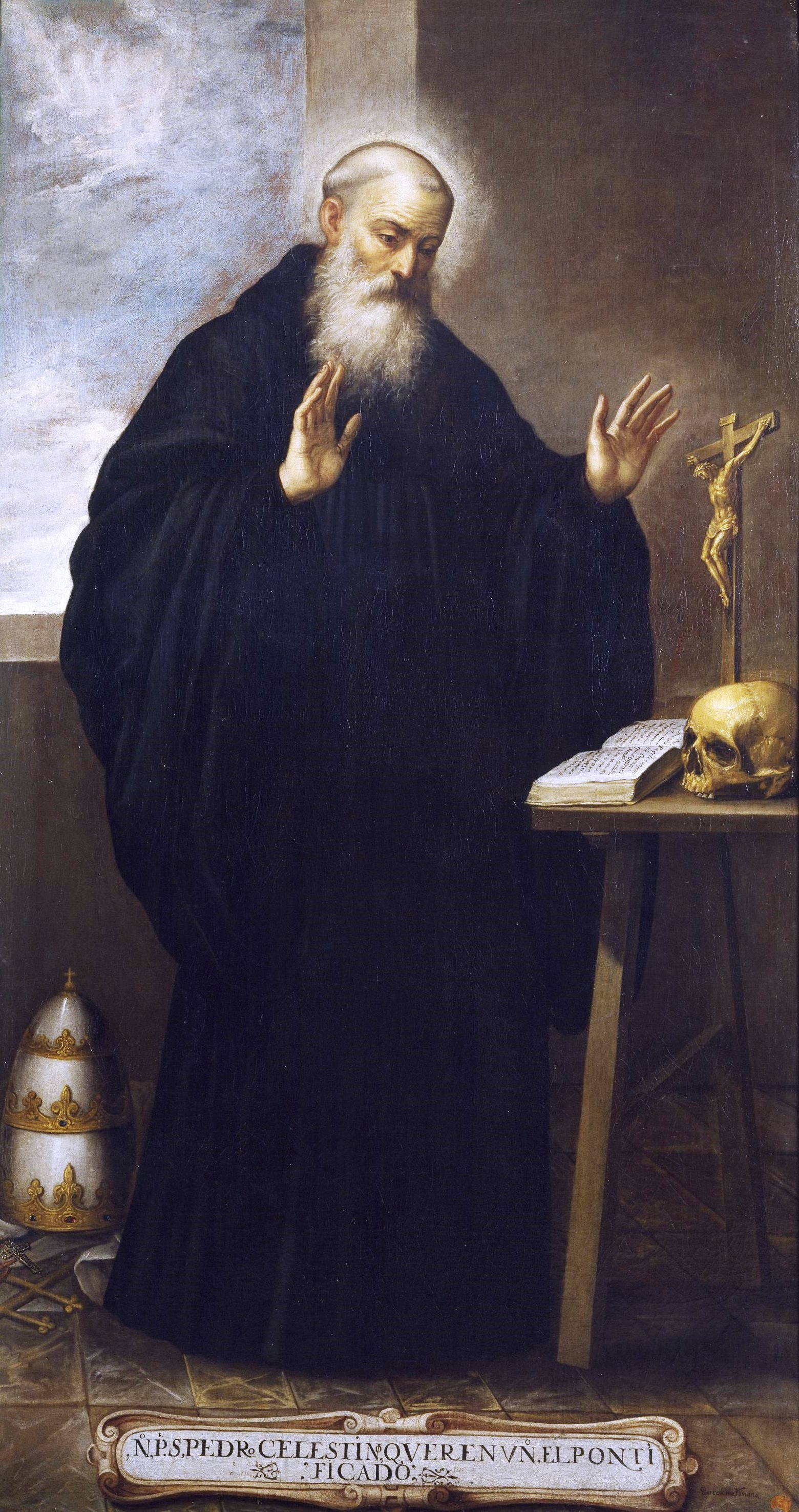
Portrait of Celestine by Bartolomé Román

Most modern interest in Celestine V has focused on his resignation. He was the first pope to formalize the resignation process and is often said to have been the first to resign; in fact he was preceded in this by Pontian (235), John XVIII (1009), Benedict IX (1045), and Gregory VI (1046). As noted above, Celestine's own decision was brought about by mild pressure from the Church establishment. His reinstitution of Gregory X's conclave system established by the papal bull Ubi periculum has been respected ever since.

A 1966 visit by Pope Paul VI to Celestine's place of death in Ferentino along with his speech in homage of Celestine prompted speculation that the Pontiff was considering retirement.

Celestine's remains survived the 2009 L'Aquila earthquake with one Italian spokesman saying it was "another great miracle by the pope". They were then recovered from the basilica shortly after the earthquake. While inspecting the earthquake damage during a 28 April 2009 visit to the L'Aquila, Pope Benedict XVI visited Celestine's remains in the badly damaged Santa Maria di Collemaggio and left the woolen pallium he wore during his papal inauguration in April 2005 on his glass casket as a gift.

To mark the 800th anniversary of Celestine's birth, Pope Benedict XVI proclaimed the Celestine year from 28 August 2009 through 29 August 2010. Benedict XVI visited the Sulmona Cathedral, near Aquila, on 4 July 2010 as part of his observance of the Celestine year and prayed before the altar consecrated by Celestine containing his relics on 10 October 1294.

His entry in the Martyrologium Romanum for 19 May reads as follows:

Ad Castrum Fumorense prope Alatrium in Latio, natalis sancti Petri Caelestini, qui, cum vitam eremeticam in Aprutio ageret, fama sanctitatis et miraculorum clarus, octogenarius Romanus Pontifex electus est, assumpto nomine Caelestini Quinti, sed eodem anno munere se abdicavit et solitudinem recedere maluit.

At Castrum Fumorense near Alatri in Lazio, the birth of Saint Peter Celestine, who, when leading the life of a hermit in Abruzzo, being famous for his sanctity and miracles, was elected Roman Pontiff as an octogenarian, assumed the name Celestine V, but abandoned his office that same year and preferred to return to solitude.

== In literature ==
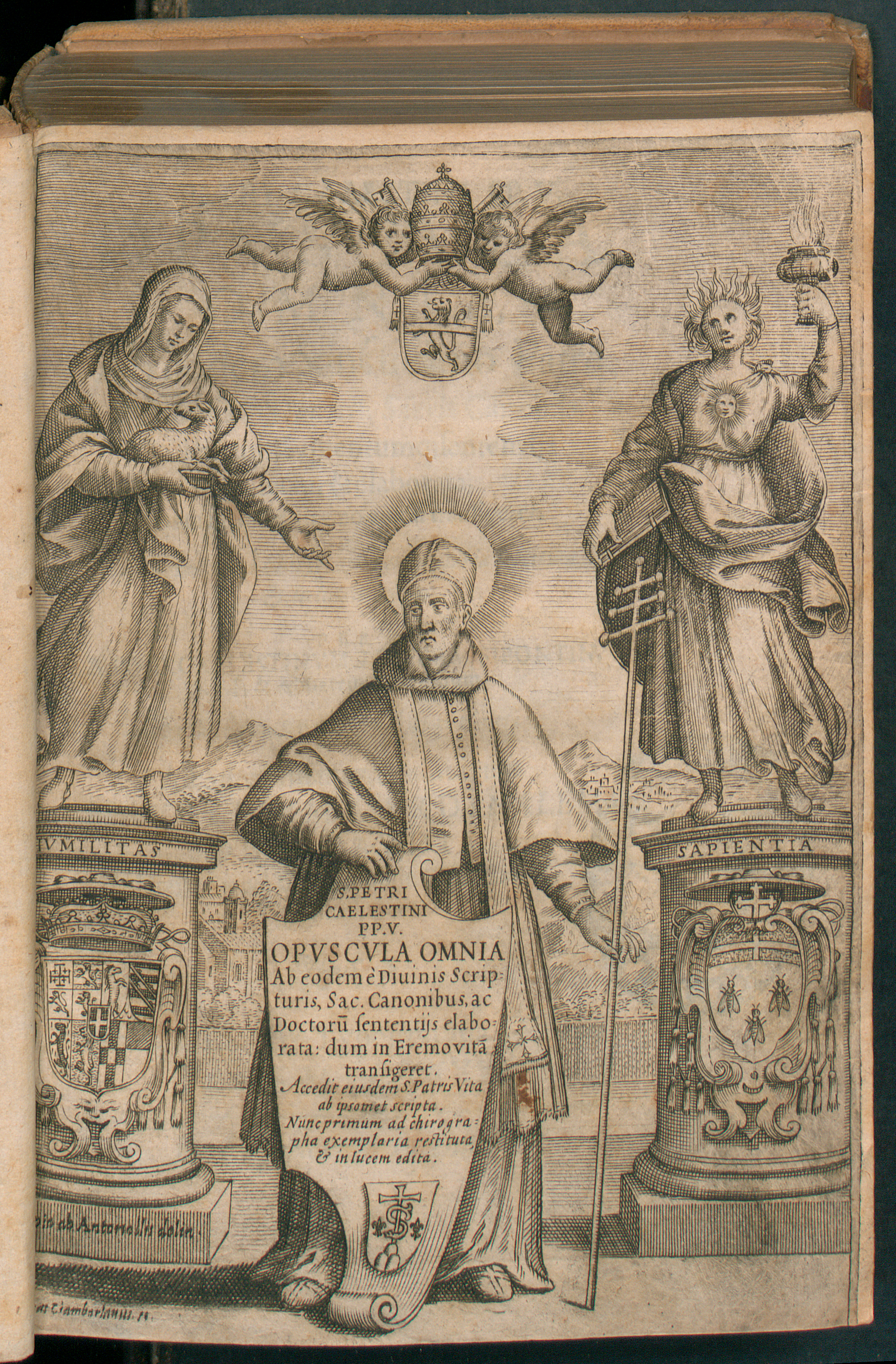
Opuscula omnia, 1640

A persistent tradition identifies Celestine V as the nameless figure Dante Alighieri sees among those in the antechamber of Hell, in the enigmatic verses:

vidi e conobbi l'ombra di colui
che fece per viltade il gran rifiuto.
("I saw and recognized the shade of him
who due to cowardice made the great refusal.")

— Inferno III, 59–60

The first commentators to make this identification included Dante's son Jacopo Alighieri, followed by Graziolo Bambaglioli in 1324. The identification is also considered probable by recent scholars (e.g., Hollander, Barbara Reynolds, Simonelli, Padoan). Petrarch was moved to defend Celestine vigorously against the accusation of cowardice and some modern scholars (e.g., Mark Musa) have suggested Dante may have meant someone else (Esau, Diocletian and Pontius Pilate have been variously suggested).

In 1346, Petrarch declared in his De vita solitaria that Celestine's refusal was a virtuous example of solitary life.

Pope Celestine V is referenced in Chapter 88 of Dan Brown's Angels & Demons, where he is controversially referenced as an example of a murdered pope. Brown writes that an X-ray of his tomb "revealed a ten-inch nail driven into the Pope's skull." While the reference to the X-ray is fictitious (no X-ray has ever been conducted on Celestine's tomb), it has been indeed alleged that Celestine was murdered, possibly by order of his successor, Pope Boniface VIII; however, there is no historical evidence of this. A 2013 examination of the half-inch hole in Celestine's skull found it to have occurred post-mortem, when the remains were already skeletonized, likely during a reburial.

The life of Pope Celestine V is dramatised in the plays L'avventura di un povero cristiano (Story of a Humble Christian) by Ignazio Silone in 1968 and Sunsets and Glories by Peter Barnes in 1990.

His life is the subject of the short story "Brother of the Holy Ghost" in Brendan Connell's short story collection The Life of Polycrates and Other Stories for Antiquated Children.

He is the subject of a popular history by author Jon M. Sweeney, The Pope Who Quit: A True Medieval Tale of Mystery, Death, and Salvation, published by Image Books/Random House in 2012. In 2013, HBO optioned the film rights.

Celestine V is the subject of the poem Che Fece...Il Gran Rifiuto by the modern Greek poet Constantine P. Cavafy.

== See also ==
- Cardinals created by Celestine V
- List of Catholic saints
- List of popes

Catholic Church titles
Preceded by Nicholas IV	Pope; 5 July – 13 December 1294	Succeeded by Boniface VIII
