= Cardinals created by Clement V =

Catholic appointments from 1305 to 1312

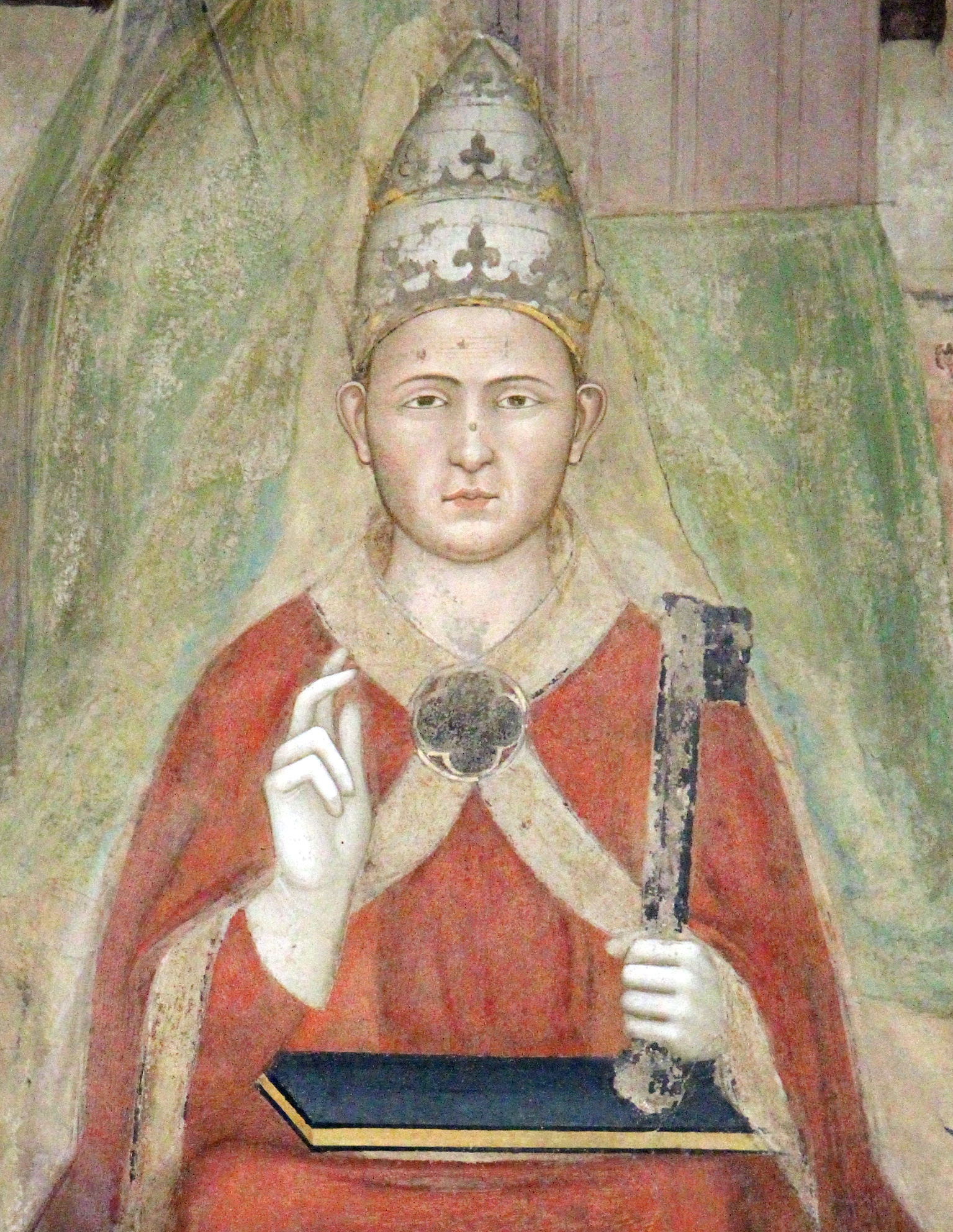
Pope Clement V (r. 1305–1314)

Pope Clement V (r. 1305–1314) created 24 cardinals in three consistories held during his pontificate. He also named his future successor Pope John XXII as a cardinal in 1312.

== 15 December 1305 ==
1. Pierre de la Chapelle Taillefert
2. Bérenger Frédol seniore
3. Arnaud de Canteloup
4. Pierre Arnaud de Puyanne O.S.B.
5. Thomas of Jorz O.P.
6. Nicolas de Fréauville O.P.
7. Etienne de Suisy
8. Arnaud de Pellegrue
9. Raymond de Got
10. Guillaume Arrufat des Forges

== 19 December 1310 ==
1. Arnaud de Faugères
2. Bertrand des Bordes
3. Arnaud Nouvel O.Cist.
4. Raymond Guillaume des Forges
5. Bernard de Garves

== 23 December 1312 ==
King Philippe IV asked the pope to offer the cardinalate to Bishop of Utrecht Guy d'Avesnes the in 1312 though the bishop declined the elevation when the pope extended the offer to him.

1. Guillaume de Mandagout Can. Reg. O.S.A.
2. Arnaud d'Aux
3. Jacques d'Euse
4. Bérenguer de Frédol iuniore
5. Michel du Bec-Crespin
6. Guillaume Teste
7. Guillaume Pierre Godin O.P.
8. Vital du Four O.F.M.
9. Raymond de Saint-Sever O.S.B.

== Sources ==
- Miranda, Salvador. "Consistories for the creation of Cardinals 14th Century (1303-1404): Clement V (1305-1314)". The Cardinals of the Holy Roman Church. Florida International University. OCLC 53276621.
