= 1314–1316 conclave =

Election of Catholic Pope John XXII

Papal conclave 1314–16

Dates and location
- 1 May 1314 – 7 August 1316: Carpentras Cathedral, Provence; Dominican house in Lyon

Key officials
- Dean: Nicolò Albertini
- Camerlengo: Arnaud d'Aux
- Protopriest: Nicolas de Fréauville
- Protodeacon: Giacomo Colonna

Election
- Vetoed: Arnaud Fournier

Elected pope
- Jacques Duèze; Name taken: John XXII
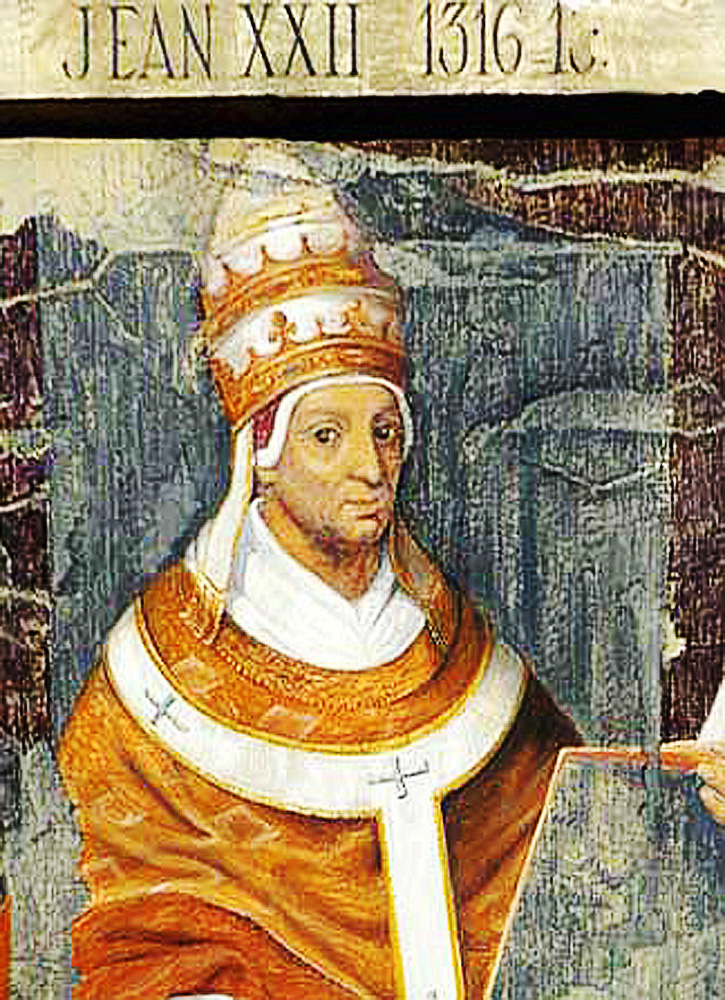

The papal conclave held from 1 May 1314 to 7 August 1316 in the apostolic palace of Carpentras and then the Dominican house in Lyon was one of the longest conclaves in the history of the Roman Catholic Church and the first conclave of the Avignon Papacy. The length of the conclave was due to the division of the cardinals into three factions: Italian (Orsini, Alberti, Stefaneschi, Caetani, Longhi, Fieschi, and both Colonna), Gascon (de Pellegrue, de Fougères, Nouvel, Teste, de Farges, de Garve, Daux, du Four, Raymond, and Godin), and French/Provençal (both Fredol, de Bec, Caignet de Fréauville, de Mandagot, and Duèze).

The Italian faction wished to return the papacy to Rome, the Gascon faction—mostly composed of the relatives of the previous pope, Clement V, wished to retain the privileges and powers they had enjoyed during his rule, and the French/Provençal opposed these aims of the Italian and Gascon factions.

== Cardinal electors ==
Among the cardinal electors there were an unusually high number of cardinal-nephews for two reasons: the previous pontiff, Clement V, had just set a record for the number of cardinal-nephews elevated by a single pontiff—soon to be surpassed by Pope Clement VI—and Clement V had reigned long enough that the only surviving Italian cardinals were those who were elevated at a younger age, who tended to be relatives of their elevator.

Elector	Nationality	Faction	Cardinal's order and title	Elevated	Elevator	Other ecclesiastical titles	Notes
Nicolò Albertini, O.P.	Prato	Italian	Cardinal-bishop of Ostia e Velletri	1303, December 18	Benedict XI	Dean of the Sacred College of Cardinals	
Bérenger Frédol, seniore	French	"French"	Cardinal-bishop of Frascati	1305, December 15	Clement V	Grand penitentiary	Cardinal-nephew
Arnaud de Falguières	French	Gascon	Cardinal-bishop of Sabina	1310, December 19	Clement V		
Guillaume de Mandagot, C.R.S.A.	French	"French"	Cardinal-bishop of Palestrina	1312, December 23	Clement V		
Arnaud d'Aux	French	Gascon	Cardinal-bishop of Albano	1312, December 23	Clement V	Camerlengo of the Holy Roman Church	Cardinal-nephew
Jacques Duèze	French	"French"	Cardinal-bishop of Porto e Santa Rufina	1312, December 23	Clement V		Elected Pope John XXII
Nicolas de Fréauville, O.P.	French	"French"	Cardinal-priest of the title of S. Eusebio	1305, December 15	Clement V	Protopriest	
Arnaud Nouvel, O.Cist.	French	Gascon	Cardinal-priest of the title of S. Prisca	1310, December 19	Clement V	Vice-Chancellor of the Holy Roman Church	
Bérenguer Frédol, iuniore	French	"French"	Cardinal-priest of the title of Ss. Nereo ed Achilleo	1312, December 23	Clement V	Camerlengo of the Sacred College of Cardinals	Cardinal-nephew
Michel du Bec-Crespin	French	"French"	Cardinal-priest of the title of S. Stefano al Monte Celio	1312, December 23	Clement V		
Guillaume Teste	French	Gascon	Cardinal-priest of the title of S. Ciriaco alle Terme	1312, December 23	Clement V		
Guillaume Pierre Godin, O.P.	French	Gascon	Cardinal-priest of the title of S. Cecilia	1312, December 23	Clement V		
Vital du Four, O.F.M.	French	Gascon	Cardinal-priest of the title of Ss. Silvestro e Martino ai Monti	1312, December 23	Clement V		
Raymond-Pierre de Moneins, O.S.B.	French	Gascon	Cardinal-priest of the title of S. Pudenziana	1312, December 23	Clement V		
Giacomo Colonna	Roman	Italian	Cardinal-deacon of S. Maria in Via Lata	1278, March 12	Nicholas III	Protodeacon; archpriest of the Liberian Basilica	Uncle of Cardinal Pietro Colonna
Napoleone Orsini	Roman	Italian	Cardinal-deacon of S. Adriano	1288, May 16	Nicholas IV	Archpriest of the Vatican Basilica	
Pietro Colonna	Roman	Italian	Cardinal-deacon of S. Angelo in Pescheria	1288, May 16	Nicholas IV	Archpriest of the Lateran Basilica; abbot of Subiaco	Nephew of Cardinal Giacomo Colonna
Guglielmo de Longhi	Bergamo	Italian	Cardinal-deacon of S. Nicola in Carcere Tulliano	1294, September 18	Celestine V		
Giacomo Gaetani Stefaneschi	Rome	Italian	Cardinal-deacon of S. Giorgio in Velabro	1295, December 17	Boniface VIII		Nephew of Boniface VIII
Francesco Caetani	Rome	Italian	Cardinal-deacon of S. Maria in Cosmedin	1295, December 17	Boniface VIII		Nephew of Boniface VIII
Luca Fieschi	Genoese	Italian	Cardinal-deacon of Ss. Cosma e Damiano	1300, March 2	Boniface VIII		Nephew of Pope Adrian V
Arnaud de Pellegrue	French	Gascon	Cardinal-deacon of S. Maria in Portico	1305, December 15	Clement V	Protector of the Order of Franciscans	Cardinal-nephew
Raymond Guillaume des Forges	French	Gascon	Cardinal-deacon of S. Maria Nuova	1310, December 19	Clement V		Cardinal-nephew
Bernard de Garves de Sainte-Livrade	French	Gascon	Cardinal-deacon of S. Eusebio	1310, December 19	Clement V		Cardinal-nephew

== Procedure ==
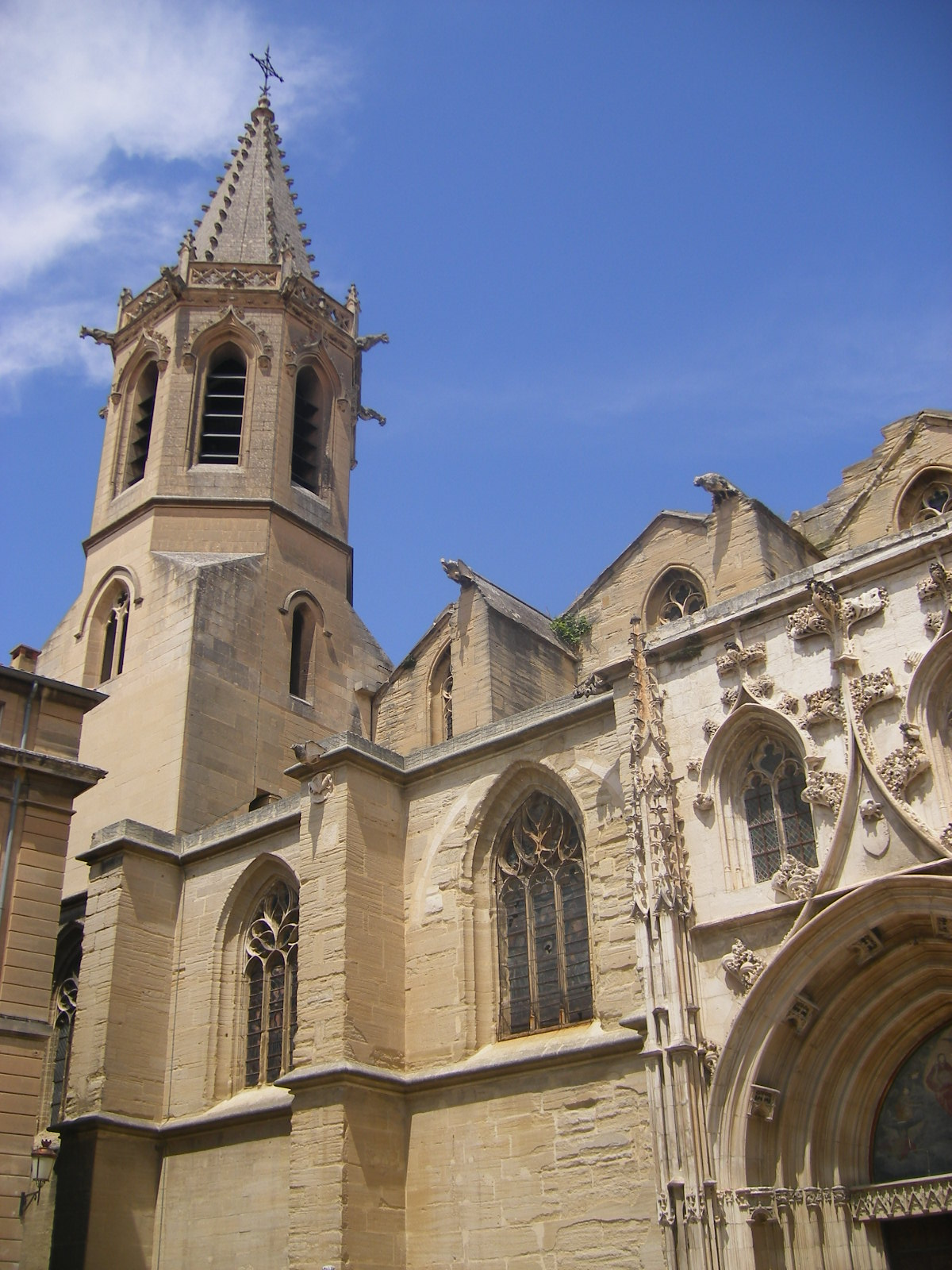
Carpentras Cathedral, where the conclave began. This building is a 15th-century replacement for the original cathedral, which collapsed in 1399.

Had the conclave taken place according to the rules prescribed by Clement V in Ne Romani (1312) and Pope Gregory X in Ubi periculum (1274), the cardinal electors would have had to meet in the diocese where the Curia was in residence (the place where letters and apostolic causes were heard), and the local magistrates would have had the authority to compel the departing cardinals to stay. Indeed, the election did begin in that location, the episcopal palace of Carpentras (north-east of Avignon), with 23 of the 24 eligible cardinals present (Fieschi was still in Italy).

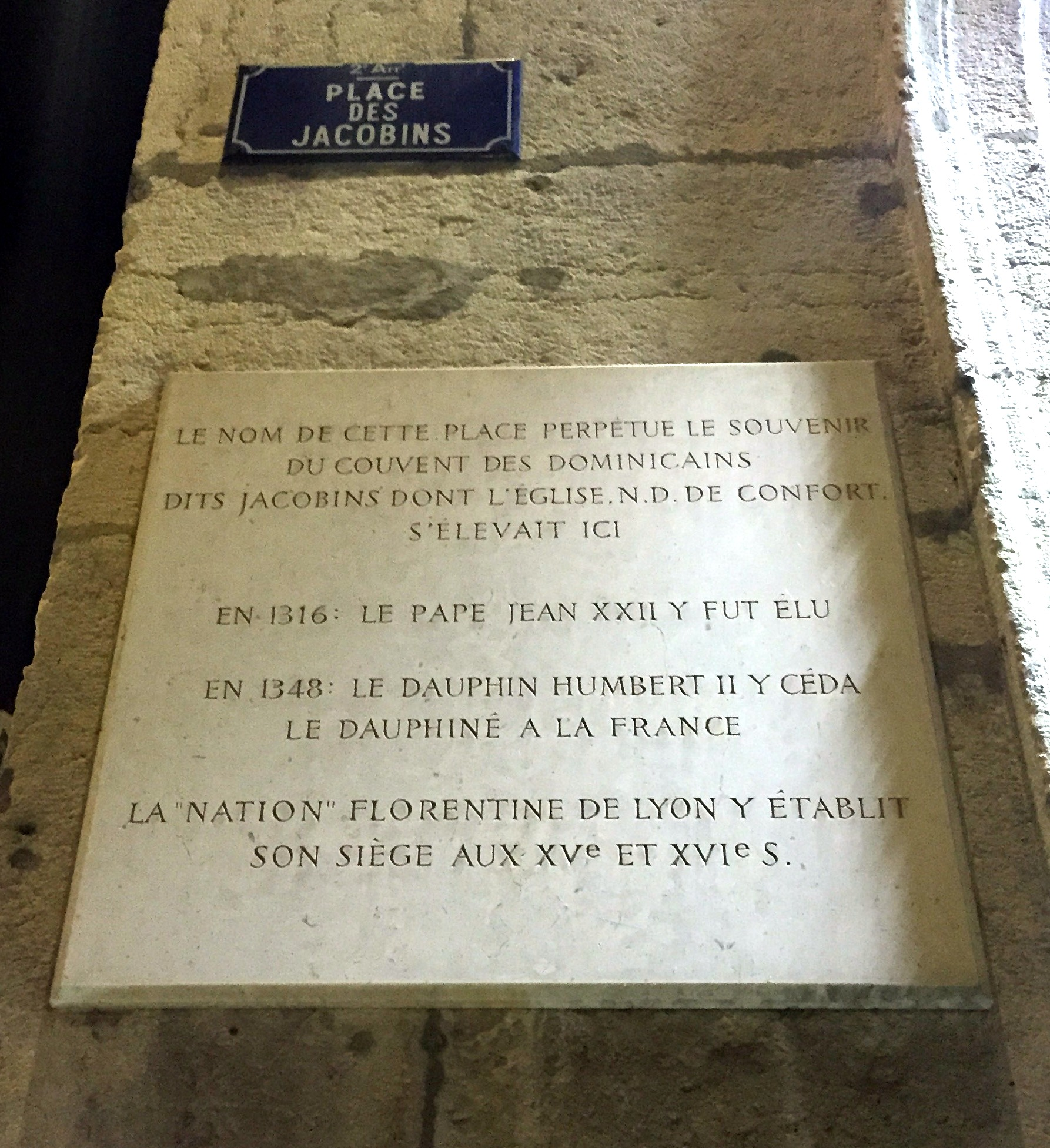
Plaque in Lyon on the site of the old Dominican convent, noting that it was there that Pope John XXII was elected in 1316.

The Italian cardinals opened the conclave by attempting to gain the support of the Provençal cardinals, proposing the candidacy of Languedocian jurist and fellow cardinal Guillaume de Mandagot (who had promised to restore the papacy to Rome and end the Gascon domination), whom the Gascons were able to defeat because of the personal opposition of Languedocian cardinal Berenguer Fredol, seniore. An impasse thereafter formed quickly and disputes between the servants of the Italian and Gascon cardinals broke out in the streets, aggravated by mercenary bands hired by the Gascon cardinal-nephews of Clement V and by the body of Clement V, still lying in the town square. Once the mercenaries openly besieged the conclave and the home in which the Italian cardinals were living, the Italian cardinals fled on July 24, 1314, and the rest of the College of Cardinals dispersed to Avignon, Orange, and Valence.

With both the Gascon and Italian cardinals threatening to hold their own elections (and thus begin another schism), Philip IV of France ("the Fair") convened a group of jurists to decide the matter, only to die on November 29, 1314. His son, Louis X of France sent a mission to disperse the Gascon cardinals and arranged for the cardinals to meet again in Lyon, through the emissary of his brother, Philip, Count of Poitiers (future Philip V of France), in March 1316. However, Louis X died, and Philip—forced to return to Paris to pursue his own interests—locked the cardinals in the Dominican convent of Lyon, leaving the Count of Forez to guard the conclave, on June 28, 1316 (previously, to get the cardinals to assemble, Philip had promised the cardinals that he would not lock them in, but he declared that the threat of schism annulled this promise).

At this point, the Gascon faction put forward the candidacy of a moderate member of their ranks, Arnaud Fournier, whose candidacy was rejected by the Count on Philip's instructions. The conclave proceeded to deadlock around the candidacies of Pellegrue, Mondagout, and Fredol. After a falling out between Napoleone Orsini and Pietro Colonna, the latter threw his support behind the Gascons, breaking the deadlock. This conclave was the last in which a compromise committee was tasked with selecting a candidate to present to the assembled cardinals. They proposed Jacques Duèze as a compromise candidate with the votes of some of the Italian faction (who had begun to fear the influence of the Colonna), some of the Gascons, the Count, and Robert of Naples. The vote was made unanimous after an accessus, that is, allowing electors to change their votes. A final point in Duèze's favor with all factions was that he was 72. When Duèze was elected on 7 August, he took the name John XXII.

== Aftermath ==
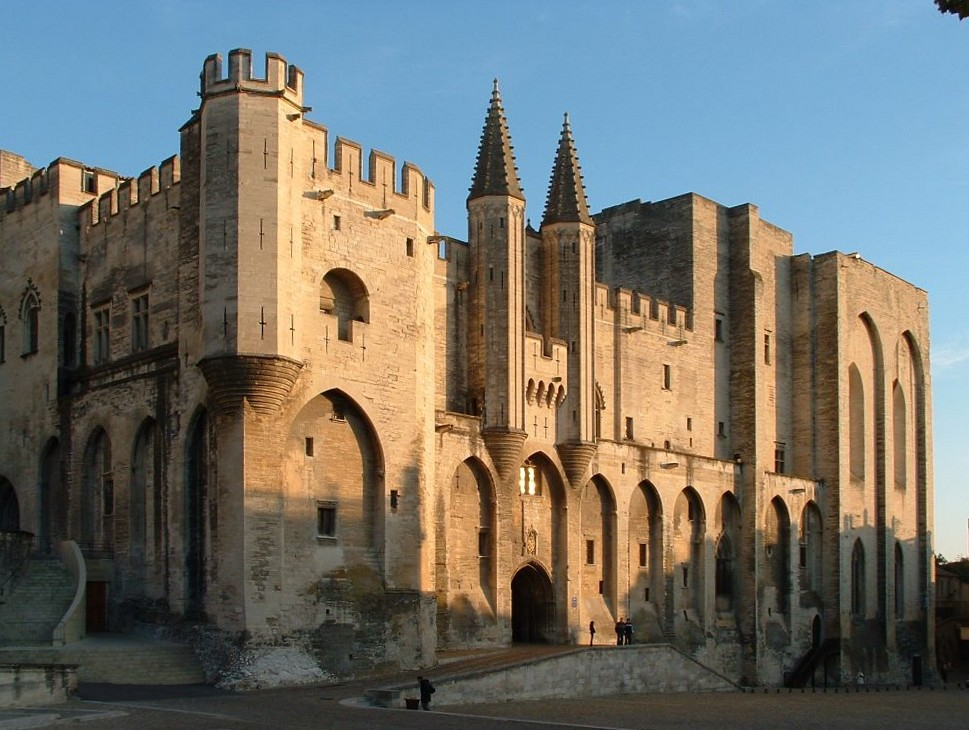
The Palais des Papes in Avignon

With Pope John XXII reopening the disputed cases before the curia on October 1 in Avignon, the location of the papacy within France appeared to be secured permanently, as the percentage of Italians within the College was only expected to decline further. Although John XXII had been expected to die quickly, he lived until 1334, reaching the age of 90. John XXII's early disputes with the Franciscans, whom he persecuted due to their views on poverty, and Louis IV of Bavaria, whose claim to the Holy Roman Empire he disputed, merged when Louis proclaimed John XXII deposed in Rome and, with the assistance of an electorate of thirteen Roman clergy, chose a Franciscan Pietro da Corbara as Antipope Nicholas V on April 18, 1328. John XXII's standing in the Curia further diminished late in his papacy when he promoted the unpopular theological view that saints would not meet God until the Last Judgment.

While Clement V had lived as a guest in the Dominican monastery of Avignon, John XXII began the construction of the Palais des Papes on the bank of the Rhone in the Comtat Venaissin. Five more French popes were elected in succession—Benedict XII (1334–1342), Clement VI (1342–1352), Innocent VI (1352–1362), Urban V (1362–1370), and Gregory XI (1370–1378)—remaining in Avignon and growing the French super-majority within the College. When the papacy did revert to Rome after the return of Gregory XI to Italy to pursue his property claims in the Papal States during the War of the Eight Saints, the result was the Western Schism.

== See also ==
- Bernard Jarre
