= Arnaud d'Aux =

14th-century French cleric

- Cardinal-Bishop of Albano
- Church: Catholic Church
- See: Albano
- In office: 23 December 1312 – 14 August 1320
- Predecessor: Leonardo Patrasso
- Successor: Vital du Four
- Previous post: Bishop of Poitiers (1306-1312)

Orders
- Consecration: 14 November 1306 by Leonardo Patrasso
- Created cardinal: 23 December 1312 by Pope Clement V

Personal details
- Born: Arnaud d'Aux de Lescout; 1260/1270 La Romieu, Duchy of Aquitaine, Kingdom of France
- Died: August 1320 (aged 49–50/59–60) Avignon, Comtat Venaissin, Papal States

Arnaud d'Aux (1260/70–August 1320) was a relative of Pope Clement V, who named him Bishop of Poitiers in November 1306 and then Cardinal-Bishop of Albano on 23 December 1312. He accompanied cardinal Arnaud Nouvel in England in 1312. He acted also as Camerlengo of the Holy Roman Church from 1311 until 1319. He participated in the papal conclave of 1314–1316 and died at Avignon.
