= Simon de Beaulieu =

French bishop and Roman Catholic Cardinal

Cardinal Simon de Beaulieu
- Cardinal-Bishop
- Archdiocese: Bourges. (1281-1294)
- Diocese: Palestrina (1294-1297)
- Predecessor: Ber(n)ardus Calliensis
- Successor: Teodorico Ranieri

Orders
- Created cardinal: 18 September 1294 by Pope Celestine V

Personal details
- Born: Beaulieu, Brie, France
- Died: 18 August 1297 Orvieto
- Education: University of Paris

Simon de Beaulieu (born at the Chateau de Beaulieu in Brie, at a date unknown; died in Orvieto, 18 August 1297) was a French bishop and Roman Catholic Cardinal. He was the son of Guy, Sieur de Beaulieu and of Agnes. Simon's brother, Jean, was Abbot of the Cistercian monastery of Notre Dame-de-Jouy in the diocese of Sens. Simon had another brother, Raoul, who was also buried (1286) at Jouy along with their mother.

== Early career ==
Simon studied at the University of Paris. He enjoyed the title of Magister.

Simon de Beaulieu became Archdeacon of Chartres and of Poitiers. He was a Canon of the Cathedral Chapter of Bourges and of S. Martin de Tours. He was Administrator of the abbey of Notre-Dame de la Charité à Besançon.

On 17 August 1276, Master Simon was commissioned (subdelegatus) by Cardinal Simon de Brion, the Papal Legate in France, to handle the case of the Masters of the Sorbonne, which had already begun, but which had been interrupted by the death of Master Nicholas, Treasurer of the Church of Châlons. Simon renewed the citations addressed to the Bishop of Paris and the Bailly, warning them either to produce their arguments by 16 November, or their charges would be dismissed. He was also given the case of the Sorbonne and the monastery of S. Geneviève, which had similarly been interrupted. His report to the Cardinal survives in a document dated 6 March 1277. In another report of 10 March 1277, he reports progress in the case against the Canons of S. Benoît for molesting the Masters of the Sorbonne. Despite Master Simon's work, however, these cases dragged on, and in September, 1279, Cardinal Simon was recalled by the Pope.

== Archbishop (1281-1294) ==
In 1281 Simon de Beaulieu was appointed Archbishop of Bourges by Pope Martin IV (Simon de Brion). After the death of Archbishop Guy on 5 March 1281, the Chapter of the Cathedral decided to proceed to an election of a successor by means of a compromise. The committee chose Jean de Soliaco, a fellow canon, but when his case came before Pope Martin IV for confirmation, he resigned the election. Pope Martin thereupon 'preferred' Magister Simon de Beaulieu. His election was confirmed by Pope Martin IV (Simon de Brion) on 23 December 1281, in a letter to the Canons of the Cathedral of Bourges. The post of Archbishop of Bourges made Archbishop Simon the Primate of Aquitaine, with supervisory powers over all the bishops of (modern) southwestern France.

Archbishop Simon was eager and active in carrying out visitations in his own diocese as well as in those of the other bishops of his ecclesiastical province. Between September and November, 1284, the Archbishop conducted a visitation of the diocese of Bordeaux. In 1285-1286, he visited the diocese of Cahors.

In September, 1286, Archbishop Simon held an ecclesiastical Council at Bourges with his suffragan bishops, Guy of Clermont, Gilbert of Limoges, Rainaldus of Cahors, Bernard of Albi, and Raimundus of Rodez. The Council produced thirty-seven statutes, many derived from papal documents and those of the onetime Papal Legate, Cardinal Simon de Brion.

In 1290-1291, Archbishop Simon again visited the diocese of Cahors.

== Cardinal ==
Archbishop Simon was created cardinal by Pope Celestine V in the Consistory of 18 September 1294, and appointed Cardinal Bishop of the Suburbicarian See of Palestrina.

Cardinal Simon participated in the very brief Conclave of 23–24 December 1294, which was held at Naples after the resignation of Celestine V on 13 December. Cardinal Benedetto Caetani was elected on the first scrutiny, and took the throne name Boniface VIII.

== Embassy to France and England (1295-1297) ==
On 18 February 1295, Pope Celestine's successor, Boniface VIII (Benedetto Caetani), appointed Cardinal Bérard de Got and Cardinal Simon de Beaulieu as Nuncios to King Edward I of England and King Philip IV of France to do everything possible to arrange a peace in the conflict that had broken out in the previous year. Next day the Pope sent a letter to King Edward, advising him of the appointment, and apologizing that he had not done it sooner, due to the dangerous roads between Naples, where he had been elected, and Rome, where he was crowned on January 23, 1295.

The two ambassadors, Bérard de Got and Simon de Beaulieu, arrived in London around the time of Pentecost, where they awaited the King's return from Wales, which came around August 1. The Cardinals presented the King with a request for a truce of two years. The King replied that treaty obligations to the King of the Romans forbade him to make a truce or peace without his consent. The Cardinals asked the King to obtain it, and he agreed to do so. On 14 August, the King wrote directly to Pope Boniface, rehearsing the same difficulties as well as his immense willingness. On the same day he signed a document authorizing the two Cardinals to treat for a truce with King Philip. The Cardinals returned to France around September 8, 1295. On 22 June 1295, Pope Boniface mentioned in a letter to his ambassadors to King Adolf that he had ratified a truce (treuga, not a peace) among Edward I, Philip IV, and Adolf, King of the Romans.

On 13 April 1296, the Pope approved another truce among the three Kings, to begin on 24 June 1296. On 21 April 1296, Boniface ordered the two cardinals to publish in France and England his Constitution on Ecclesiastical Liberties, Clericis laicos, which he had signed in February. In the Spring of 1296, Cardinal Bérard de Got returned to England alone, but was unable to extract any promise of peace from King Edward, who was eagerly pursuing his Scottish war. He left Cardinal Simon de Beaulieu in France to deal with King Philip on his own, as the conflict between King and Pope intensified. On 18 August, Pope Boniface repeated his order to the two cardinals to publish Clericis Laicos in England and France. On 25 September, he wrote directly to King Philip, complaining about Philip's ingratitude in the face of the Pope's efforts to restrain King Adolf from invading his kingdom, and notifying him that he was sending an ambassador, Guillaume de Falgariis, O.Min., Bishop of Viviers, to compose their differences. On 30 September Pope Boniface renewed the Bull Clericis Laicos and warned King Philip that, unless he did what the Pope wanted, the Pope was prepared to suffer not only persecutions but even death itself for the sake of the liberty of the Church. Philip retaliated by forbidding the exportation of money, horses or arms from France without a royal licence. On 7 February 1297, Pope Boniface complained about Philip's general edict. Two days later the Pope wrote to the two cardinals, that, if Philip or any of his agents should attempt to impede the flow of money or supplies for the Crusade, they should be publicly denounced and made subject to canonical penalties. On 20 April 1297, Cardinal Bérard and Cardinal Simon issued a joint declaration that they had attempted to treat with King Philip face to face about the truce which had expired on 24 June, and that they wanted to acquaint the King with Pope Boniface's proposals for its extension. Before the letter of the Pope could be read out, King Philip made a formal protest that no one could dictate to him about the temporal affairs of his realm. The cardinals at that point could only publish the truce, its prorogation, and the letters of Pope Boniface.

On 11 August 1297, Louis IX of France, grandfather of Philip IV, became Saint Louis in a ceremony held at Orvieto by Pope Boniface VIII.

== Death ==
Cardinal Simon de Beaulieu died at Orvieto on 18 August 1297, and was buried in the Franciscan church, before the High Altar.

Even after his death, Cardinal Simon continued to play a part in the struggle between Philip the Fair and Boniface VIII. It was alleged by the persecutors of Boniface VIII in the famous posthumous trial of 1310-1311 that Cardinal Simon had warned Philip IV that Boniface had been accused of heresy and that Boniface had tricked Pope Celestine out of the papacy. Cardinal Simon, however, was a supporter and defender of Pope Boniface during his lifetime, and such charges are completely unconvincing. The same imputations could not be placed on the other Nuncio, Cardinal Bérard de Got, since he had been the brother of Pope Clement V (Bertrand de Got). Cardinal Simon, therefore, was made to bear the burden of being a posthumous false witness.

== Bibliography ==
- Pierre Dupuy, Histoire du différend d'entre le pape Boniface VIII. et Philippes le Bel Roy de France (Paris: Sebastien Cramoisy, 1655). (in French and Latin)
- Jean-Aimar Piganiol de la Force, Nouvelle description de la France Tome troisième (Paris 1753).
- Jean Roy, Nouvelle histoire des cardinaux françois, ornée de leurs portraits Tome cinquième (Paris: Chez Poinçot 1788), "Simon de Beaulieu".
- Paul Maria Baumgarten, "Die Cardinalsernennungen Cälastins V. im September und Oktober 1294," (Stephan Ehses, editor) Festschrift zum elfhundertjährigen Jubiläum des deutschen Campo Santo in Rom (Freiburg im Breisgau: Herder 1897) 161-169.
- A. Theiner (ed.), Caesaris Baronii Annales Ecclesiastici Tomus 23 (Bar-le-Duc 1871). [Baronius-Theiner] (in Latin)
- E. Depeyre, Visites du diocèse de Cahors par Simon de Beaulieu, archevêque de Bourges, 1285-1286, 1290-1291 (Cahors: F. Delpérier, 1901).
- Georges Digard, Les registres de Boniface VIII Tome I (Paris 1890). (in Latin)
- Ernest Langlois, Les registres de Nicolas IV (Paris 1905). (in Latin)
- Ferdinand Gregorovius, History of the City of Rome in the Middle Ages, Volume V, second edition, revised (London: George Bell, 1906).
- L. de Lacger, "La primauté d'Aquitaine du viiie au xive siècle," Revue d'histoire de l'Eglise de France 23 (1937), 29-50.
- P. Glorieux, Aux origins de la Sorbonne. II. Le cartulaire (Paris: J. Vrin 1965). (in French and Latin)
- J. de Bascher, "La chronologie des visites pastorals de Simon de Beaulieu," Revue d'histoire de l'Eglise de France 58 (1972), 73-89.
- John Marrone and Charles Zuckerman, "Cardinal Simon of Beaulieu and relations between Philip the Fair and Boniface VIII", Traditio 21 (1975), 195–222.
- A. Trinci, "Il collegio cardinalizio di Celestino V," Celestino V e i suoi tempi: realta spirituale e realta politica. Atti del 4° Convegno storico internazionale L'Aquila, 26-27 agosto 1989 (ed. W. Capezzali) (L'Aquila 1990), pp. 19–34.
- F. Delivré, "La visite du primat d'Aquitaine Simon de Beaulieu archevêque de Bourges, dans la province ecclésiastique de Bordeaux (septembre-novembre 1284)," RM 74 (2002) 133-160.
- Jean-Loup Lemaître, "La visite des monastères limousins par Simon de Beaulieu en 1285," Revue benedictine 114 (2004), pp. 158–178.
- Jean Dunbabin, The French in the Kingdom of Sicily, 1266-1305 (Cambridge: Cambridge University Press 2011), pp. 206–207.
