= Cardinals created by Boniface VIII =

Catholic appointments from 1295 to 1302

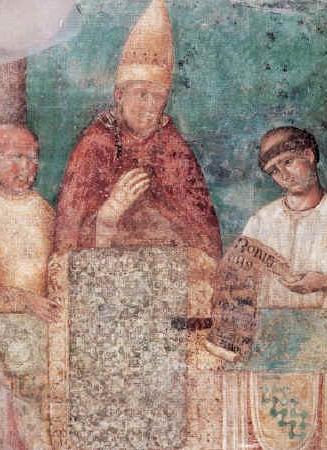
Pope Boniface VIII (r. 1294–1303)

Pope Boniface VIII (r. 1294–1303) created 15 new cardinals in five consistories:

== Consistory at the beginning of 1295 ==
1. Benedetto Caetani, nephew of the Pope – cardinal-deacon of SS. Cosma e Damiano, † 14 December 1296

== Consistory of 17 December 1295 ==
1. Giacomo Tomasi Caetani, O.F.M., nephew of the Pope – cardinal-priest of S. Clemente, † 1 January 1300
2. Francesco Napoleone Orsini – cardinal-deacon of S. Lucia in Orthea. † 1312.
3. Giacomo Gaetani Stefaneschi – cardinal-deacon of S. Giorgio in Velabro, † 23 June 1341
4. Francesco Caetani, nephew of the Pope – cardinal-deacon of S. Maria in Cosmedin, † 16 May 1317
5. Pietro Valeriano Duraguerra, vice-chancellor of the Holy Roman Church – cardinal-deacon of S. Maria Nuova, † 17 December 1302.

== Consistory of 4 December 1298 ==
1. Gonzalo Pérez Gudiel, archbishop of Toledo – cardinal-bishop of Albano, † in December 1299.
2. Teodorico Ranieri, elect of Pisa, camerlengo of the Holy Roman Church – cardinal-priest of S. Croce in Gerusalemme, then (13 June 1299) cardinal-bishop of Città Papale, † 7 December 1306.
3. Niccolò Boccasini, O.P., master general of the Order of Preachers – cardinal-priest of S. Sabina (received the title on 25 March 1299), then cardinal-bishop of Ostia e Velletri (2 March 1300); became Pope Benedict XI on 22 October 1303, † 7 July 1304
4. Riccardo Petroni, vice-chancellor of the Holy Roman Church – cardinal-deacon of S. Eustachio, † 10 February 1314.

== Consistory of 2 March 1300 ==
1. Leonardo Patrasso, relative of the Pope, archbishop of Capua – cardinal-bishop of Albano, † 7 December 1311.
2. Gentile Partino, O.F.M. – cardinal-priest of SS. Silvestro e Martino, † 27 October 1312.
3. Luca Fieschi – cardinal-deacon of S. Maria in Via Lata, † 31 January 1336.

== Consistory of 15 December 1302 ==
1. Pedro Ispano, bishop of Burgos – cardinal-bishop of Sabina, † 20 December 1310.
2. Giovanni Mincio da Morrovalle, O.F.M., master general of the Order of Friars Minor – cardinal-bishop of Porto e S. Rufina, † in August 1312

== Sources ==
- Miranda, Salvador. "Consistories for the creation of Cardinals 13th Century (1198-1303): Boniface VIII". The Cardinals of the Holy Roman Church. Florida International University. OCLC 53276621.
- Konrad Eubel, Hierarchia Catholica, vol. I, 1913
