= Gonzalo Pérez Gudiel =

Cardinal-Bishop of Albano

Gonzalo Pérez 'Gudiel' (1238/9–1299), simply Gonzalo Pérez during his life (Gonzalbo Petrez, غنصالبه نيطرص, in his native mozarab Arabic), and wrongly Gonzalo García Gudiel in later church tradition, was a Castilian prelate and statesman in the service of kings Alfonso X and Sancho IV and of Pope Boniface VIII. He was Bishop of Cuenca (1272) and Burgos (1275) and then Archbishop of Toledo (1280), the first official Primate of Spain (1285) and finally Cardinal-Bishop of Albano (1298) in the Roman Curia. His early career was that of an international scholar, before he settled into royal service.

The future cardinal was born at Toledo in 1238 or 1239 into the city's mozarab gentry, to alguacil alcalde Pedro Juanes and his wife Teresa Juanes, daughter of alguacil alcalde Juan Ponce. The surname under which he is known, Gudiel, was attached to him by later church historians under the mistaken belief that he derived from a family of that name; his Toledo birth family had yet to adopt a surname. The historians also assigned to him an erroneous patronymic, calling him Gonzalo García instead of his true name, Gonzalo Pérez.

Gonzalo went to study at the University of Paris. In 1260 he became the rector of the University of Padua. After a sojourn in Rome, he returned to Castile to become a first a canon of the Cathedral of Burgos and then the dean of the chapter at the Cathedral of Toledo.

In 1272, Gonzalo was elected Bishop of Cuenca. During this period he served the king at times as a royal notary. In 1274 he received a gift from the king, and the charter was written up by Ferrand Martínez. On 27 September 1275 he was translated to the see of Burgos (vacant since 1269), and in May 1280 to the archdiocese of Toledo, the most important bishopric in Castile. In 1285 he was recognised as the primate of Spain (primas Hispaniae).

Under Sancho IV, Gonzalo was "great chancellor in all our realms" (chanceller mayor en todos nuestros regnos) and Ferrand Martínez his scribe, but with the king's death in 1295 the archbishop's influence decreased. In the cortes held at Valladolid in the summer of that year, it was declared that ecclesiastical control of the chancery should cease. Chancery notaries should be laymen (legos). Gonzalo was one of those who opposed the assumption of the tutorship of the young king, Ferdinand IV, by his uncle, Henry the Senator, regarding the latter as "a great disturber" (un gran bolliciador). In the consistory of 4 December 1298 Pope Boniface VIII appointed him to the cardinal-bishopric of Albano. He died not long after in Rome, where he was buried in a "very nobly worked" (muy noblemente obrada) sarcophagus in the church of Santa Maria Maggiore, “near the chapel of presepe domini, where Saint Jerome lies buried.”

In the year 1300, in keeping with a promise he had made to the cardinal some years earlier, Ferrand Martínez went to Rome to fetch his body for burial in the cathedral of Toledo, in the front of the chapel of Santa María la Blanca. The return trip with the cardinal's body was extremely leisurely, making its way through Logroño to Burgos, where the corpse was received by King Ferdinand IV and his court, including Henry the Senator, Diego López V de Haro and Bishop Pedro Rodríguez of Burgos. This was probably between March and May 1301. At Peñafiel outside of Toledo it was received by Gonzalo's nephew, Gonzalo Díaz Palomeque, the new archbishop and by the local lord, Juan Manuel. It was reportedly greeted in the streets of Toledo by a delighted crowd of Christians, Jews and Muslims. The story of Gonzalo's relics is told in the prologue of the near-contemporary chivalric novel Libro del caballero Zifar, possibly written by Ferrand Martínez.

== Notes ==
Catholic Church titles
Preceded by Pedro Laurencio	Bishop of Cuenca; 1272–1275	Succeeded by Diego
Preceded by Juan de Villahoz	Bishop of Burgos; 1275–1280	Succeeded by Fernando
Preceded by Fernando Rodríguez de Covarrubia	Archbishop of Toledo; 1280–1298	Succeeded by Gonzalo Díaz Palomeque
Preceded by Bérard de Got	Cardinal-bishop of Albano; 1298–1299	Succeeded by Leonardo Patrasso
