= Sainte-Livrade =

- Commune
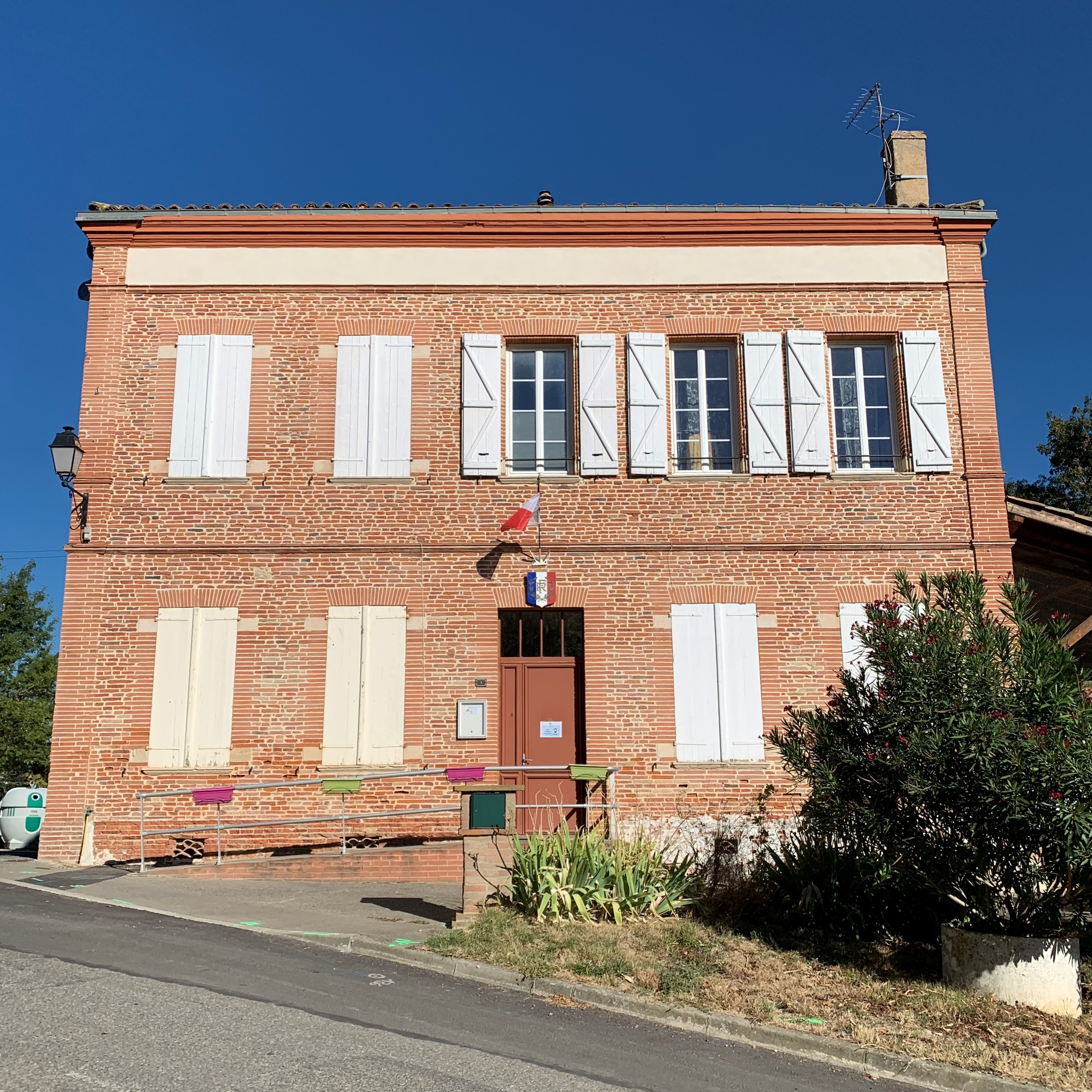
- Town hall
- Location of Sainte-Livrade
- Location within France Location within Occitanie
- Coordinates: 43°39′03″N 1°06′18″E
- Country: France
- Region: Occitania
- Department: Haute-Garonne
- Arrondissement: Toulouse
- Canton: Léguevin
- Intercommunality: CC Le Grand Ouest Toulousain

Government
  - Mayor (2023–2026): Marie-Madeleine Léa Barrere
- Area^{1}: 6.16 km^{2} (2.38 sq mi)
- Elevation: 220 m (720 ft)
- Highest elevation: 200 m (660 ft)
- Lowest elevation: 132 m (433 ft)
- Population (2023): 255
  - Density: 41.4/km^{2} (107/sq mi)
- Time zone: UTC+01:00 (CET)
  - Summer (DST): UTC+02:00 (CEST)
- INSEE/Postal code: 31496 /31530
- ^{1} French Land Register data, which excludes lakes, ponds, glaciers > 1 km^{2} (0.386 sq mi or 247 acres) and river estuaries.

Sainte-Livrade (French pronunciation: [sɛ̃t livʁad]; Occitan: Senta Liurada) is a commune in the Haute-Garonne department in southwestern France.

== Population ==
Historical population
Year	Pop.	±% p.a.
1968	151	—
1975	147	−0.38%
1982	189	+3.66%
1990	224	+2.15%
1999	246	+1.05%
2007	279	+1.59%
2012	288	+0.64%
2017	271	−1.21%
2023	255	−1.01%
Source: INSEE

== See also ==
- Bernard Jarre
- Communes of the Haute-Garonne department
