= Leonardo Patrasso =

Italian Franciscan and Cardinal

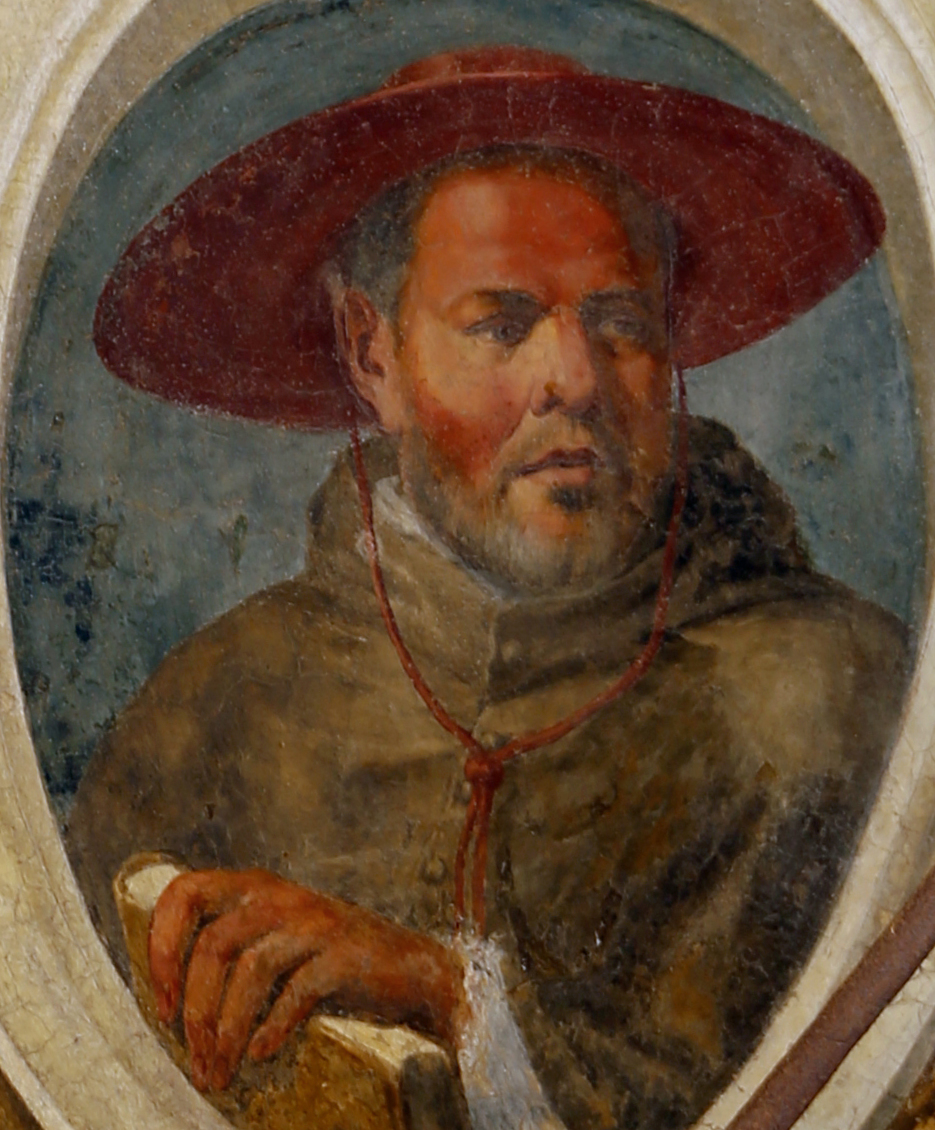
Leonardo Patrasso

Leonardo Patrasso (Alatri, 1230 – Lucca, 7 December 1311) was an Italian Franciscan and Cardinal.

He was a canon at Alatri, and from 1290 its bishop. He was bishop of Aversa from 1297 to 1299. His nephew, Pope Boniface VIII, made him a cardinal in the Consistory of 2 March 1300. Dean of the Sacred College of Cardinals, August 1309 until his death.

== Notes ==
Catholic Church titles
Preceded by Giacomo Tomasi Caetani	Bishop of Alatri; 1290–1295	Succeeded by ?
Preceded by Landolfo Brancaccio	Bishop of Aversa; 1297–1299	Succeeded by Pietro Turrite
Preceded by Gonzalo Pérez Gudiel	Cardinal-bishop of Albano; 1300–1311	Succeeded by Arnaud d'Aux
