= Bentivenga dei Bentivenghi =

Italian Franciscan and cardinal

His Eminence Bentivenga de Bentivengis
- Cardinal-Bishop
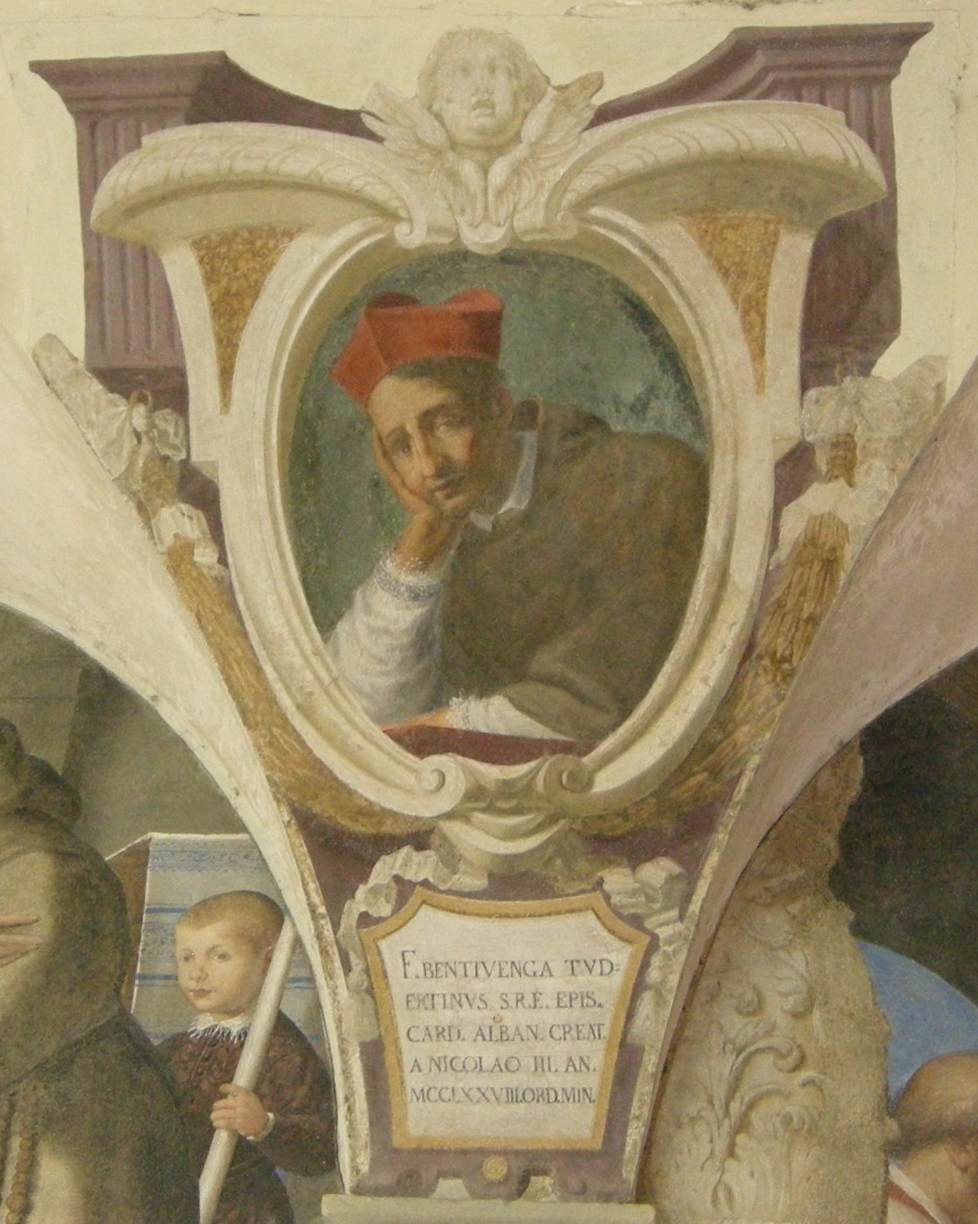
- Diocese: Albano
- Predecessor: Bonaventure
- Successor: Bérard de Got

Orders
- Created cardinal: 12 March 1278 by Pope Nicholas III

Personal details
- Born: c. 1230 Aquasparta, Umbria, Italy
- Died: last week of March 1289 (aged 58–59) Todi

Bentivenga dei Bentivenghi (c. 1230 – 25 or 26 March 1289), also written Bentivenga de Bentivengis or Bentivegna de' Bentivegni, was an Italian Franciscan and cardinal.

== Early life ==
Bentivenga de Bentivengis was born in Aquasparta, in Umbria. He had at least two siblings, a brother named Angelerius and a sister named Clara. He entered the Order of Franciscans at a young age, and took a degree in theology; he held the title Magister. He became famous as a theologian and preacher.

In 1264, he was personal chaplain of Cardinal Stephen Báncsa, Bishop of Palestrina. Cardinal Báncsa died in 1270, during the Conclave of 1268–1271. He had also been chaplain and confessor of Cardinal Giovanni Caetano Orsini, probably between 1271 and 1276. Cardinal Orsini became Pope Nicholas III on 25 November 1277. One may assume, therefore, that Bentivenga was present for the three conclaves that took place in 1276. He may even have accompanied Cardinal Orsini to the Second Ecumenical Council at Lyons in 1273–1275; it is certain that Cardinal Orsini was there along with all of the other cardinals. In 1276 Fr. Bentivenga was elected bishop of Todi (1276–1278) and confirmed by Pope John XXI. He held the bishopric until he was named a cardinal, a matter of some fifteen months; his successor was Angelerius de Bentevengis, his own brother.

In the consistory of 12 March 1278, Pope Nicholas III created him Cardinal-Bishop of Albano. In a papal bull of 12 September 1278, Cardinal Bentivenga is mentioned as having been an examiner into the election of a new abbot for the Monastery of Nonantola. In January 1279 he sat on a cardinalatial committee that examined and approved the election of John Peckham as Archbishop of Canterbury. On 25 September 1279 Pope Nicholas named him to assist in the office of the Penitentiaries up to the next Easter Sunday. Cardinal Bentivenga is claimed as an Auditor of the Rota under Nicholas III. He was involved in the redaction of the Constitution Exiit qui seminat, of Nicholas III, which was issued on 14 August 1279. In the Spring of 1280, Cardinal Bentivenga advised Pope Nicholas on the appointment of a new bishop for the diocese of Troia, and the Pope was pleased to follow his recommendation. Pope Nicholas died of an apoplectic stroke on 22 August 1280, at Castro Soriano in the diocese of Viterbo. The election of his successor would therefore take place in Viterbo, which had seen two other conclaves in the previous five years—both of them violent.

== Papal election, 1280–81 ==
Cardinal Bentivenga participated in the Conclave which followed the Pope's death. It had been clear for some time that it would be a difficult business. Nicholas III had created a total of nine cardinals, and had taken care to diminish greatly the number of adherents of the Angevin King Charles I of Sicily, who had had a strong hand in the previous four conclaves. Charles nonetheless intended to have a pope to suit his needs. At the time of the Pope's death there were thirteen cardinals, three of whom were Orsini who would never vote to accommodate King Charles. Two or three more opponents could (and did) produce a deadlock. The city of Viterbo was in the hands of enemies of the Orsini, who had led the people of Viterbo in expelling the late Pope's nephew, Orso Orsini, replacing him with a regime favorable to King Charles. Charles himself was in Viterbo. Worried about the functioning of necessary organs of the Church in the spiritual realm, the Cardinals on 28 August 1280 elected Bentivenga to the office of penitentiary and put him in charge of the other penitentiaries and their staff. With these powers, on 25 September, Cardinal Bentivenga dispensed a priest who, against the rules of his diocesan synod, had taken longer than a year to be ordained after obtaining a parish, and thereby occurred the penalty of excommunication.

The worries of the cardinals about a deadlocked Conclave were justified, for the Conclave continued through the rest of 1280 with no resolution. January 1281 passed, and still there was no pope. Then Riccardo Annibaldi, the hereditary enemy of the Orsini intervened. Stirring up the people of Viterbo, he led an attack on the Conclave which resulted in the kidnapping of two of the Orsini cardinals, Matteo Rosso Orsini and Giordano Orsini (the late pope's brother). Cardinal Giordano was released after three days, apparently having given some guarantees, while Cardinal Matteo was held until after the new pope was chosen. On 22 February the Cardinals, thoroughly intimidated, elected the man who had negotiated King Charles' entry into Italy and coronation as King of Sicily, Cardinal Simon de Brion, who became Pope Martin IV.

Nine days after his election and twenty days before his Coronation, on Monday 3 March, Pope Martin IV granted Cardinal Bentivenga a number of penitential powers, individually denominated, which belonged to the Pope, including the right of absolving from ecclesiastical censures and excommunications, including those imposed by diocesan bishops and by the University of Paris; this extended to persons travelling to the Holy Land on penitential pilgrimages. On 12 August the Cardinal was granted the power of absolving the Romans who had participated in the forbidden election of King Charles to the office of Senator of Rome. He sometimes notes that his decisions are given after oral instructions from the Pope.

== Papal election, 1285 ==
Cardinal Bentivenga participated in the Papal election, 1285—a one-day Conclave that produced a pope on the first ballot, the Roman aristocrat, Giacomo Savelli, who took the name Honorius IV; and the Papal election, 1287-1288—a long drawn out affair, due to illnesses and the plague, that caused all the cardinals but one to leave the Conclave to convalesce or die in their own homes. Five cardinals died. Cardinal Bentivenga continued to function as penitentiary during the Sede Vacante of 1287–1288. He was still at the papal residence at Santa Sabina on 14 May 1287. He is sometimes said to have been Dean of the Sacred College of Cardinals from December 1285, though there is no positive evidence of the fact or the title. On 4 May 1288 he was assigned the commenda of the title Church of SS. Giovanni e Paolo on the Caelian Hill. He is mentioned as the author of a sermon collection and a Veritatis Theologicae Volumen, both disappeared.

== Later life ==
Far in anticipation of the need, Cardinal Bentivenga obtained from Pope Martin IV the right to make his own Last Will and Testament. The date on the grant is 5 August 1281. The Annales Minorum state that Cardinal Bentivenga died at Todi on 16 March (xvii kal. Apr.) 1289, and that he was buried in the Franciscan church of S. Fortunato. Ferdinando Ughelli agrees as to the place, but puts Bentivenga's death on March 26 (vii kal. Apr.). An alternative scenario places his death in Rome and his burial in S. Maria in Aracoeli. It has been pointed out that one of the codicils of his Last Will and Testament was signed at Rome on 25 March 1289, making it unlikely that he died in Todi on the 16th.

== Bibliography ==
- Annibale Tenneroni, "Inventario di sacri arredi appartenuti ai Cardinali Bentivenga e Matteo Bentivegna di Acquasparta," Archivio storico italiano 2 (1888), 260–266.
- C. Eubel, "Der Registerband des Cardinalgrossponitentiars Bentevenga," Archiv für katholischen Kirchenrecht 64 (1890), 3–69.
