= Bernard Jarre =

French Cardinal (died 1328)

Coat of arms of Bernard de Garves

Bernard Jarre (or Garves) (died 1328) was a French Cardinal in the period of the Avignon papacy.

== Biography ==
He was born at Sainte-Livrade in the diocese of Agen and was a relative of Pope Clement V. From 1307, he is attested as archdeacon of Coutances. On 19 December 1310, Clement V appointed him cardinal-deacon of S. Agata; he was one of at least seven relatives of this pope promoted by him to the cardinalate. He participated in the 1314–1316 papal conclave. New Pope John XXII promoted him to the rank of cardinal-priest of S. Clemente on 18 December 1316. He died at Avignon.
