= Suburbicarian Diocese of Albano =

Roman Catholic diocese in Rome, Italy

Coordinates: 41°43′48″N 12°39′36″E

Suburbicarian Diocese of Albano Albanensis

Catholic
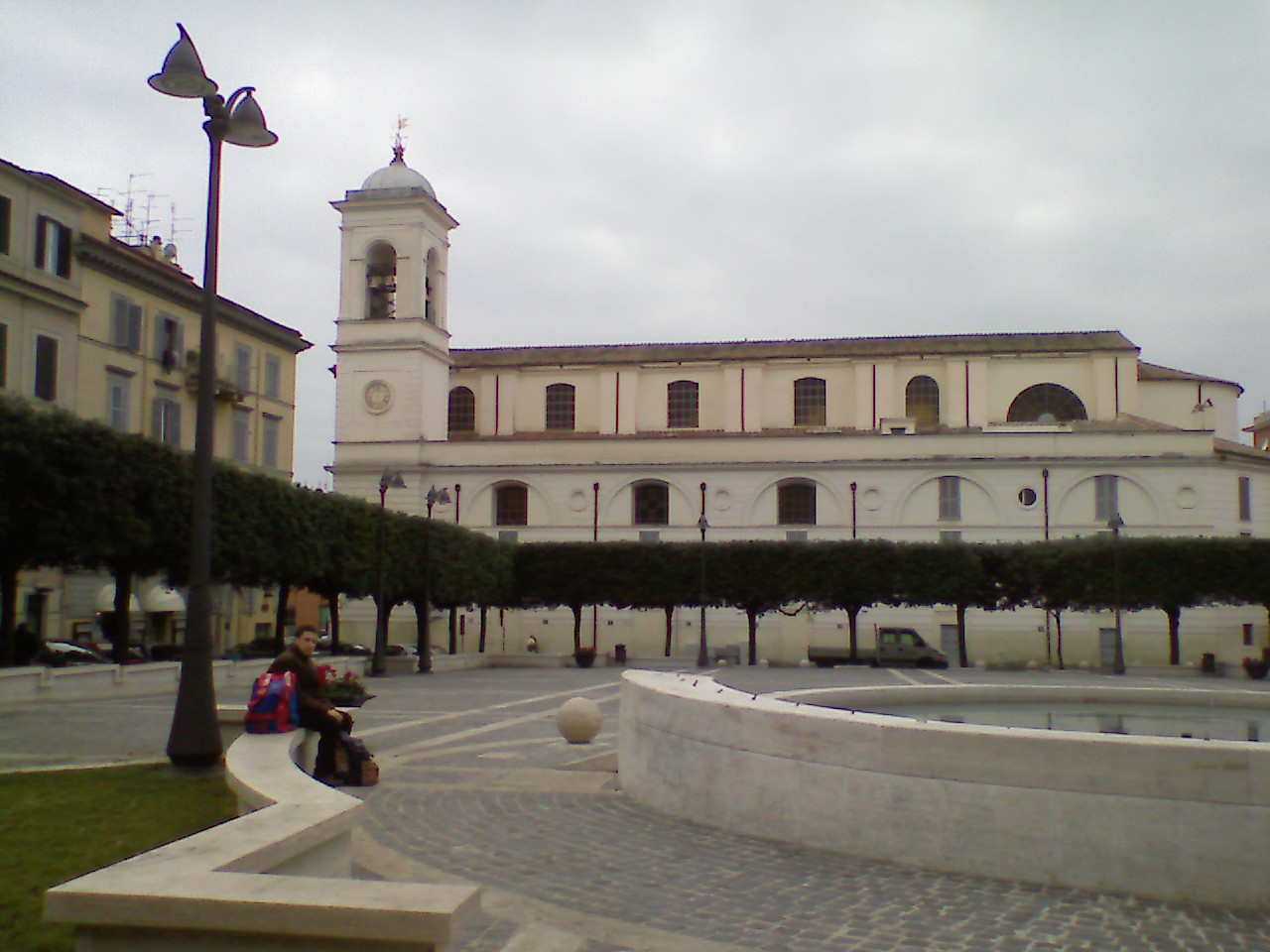
- Albano Laziale Cathedral

Location
- Country: Italy
- Ecclesiastical province: Rome

Statistics
- Area: 661 km^{2} (255 sq mi)
- Population: Total; Catholics: (as of 2018); 510,950 (est.); 493,870 (est.) (96%)
- Parishes: 77

Information
- Denomination: Catholic Church
- Rite: Roman Rite
- Established: 4th century
- Cathedral: Basilica Cattedrale di S. Pancrazio Martire
- Secular priests: 104 (diocesan); 80 (Religious Orders)

Current leadership
- Pope: Leo XIV
- Bishop: Luis Antonio Tagle (Cardinal-bishop); Vincenzo Viva (Diocesan bishop)
- Bishops emeritus: Marcello Semeraro

Map
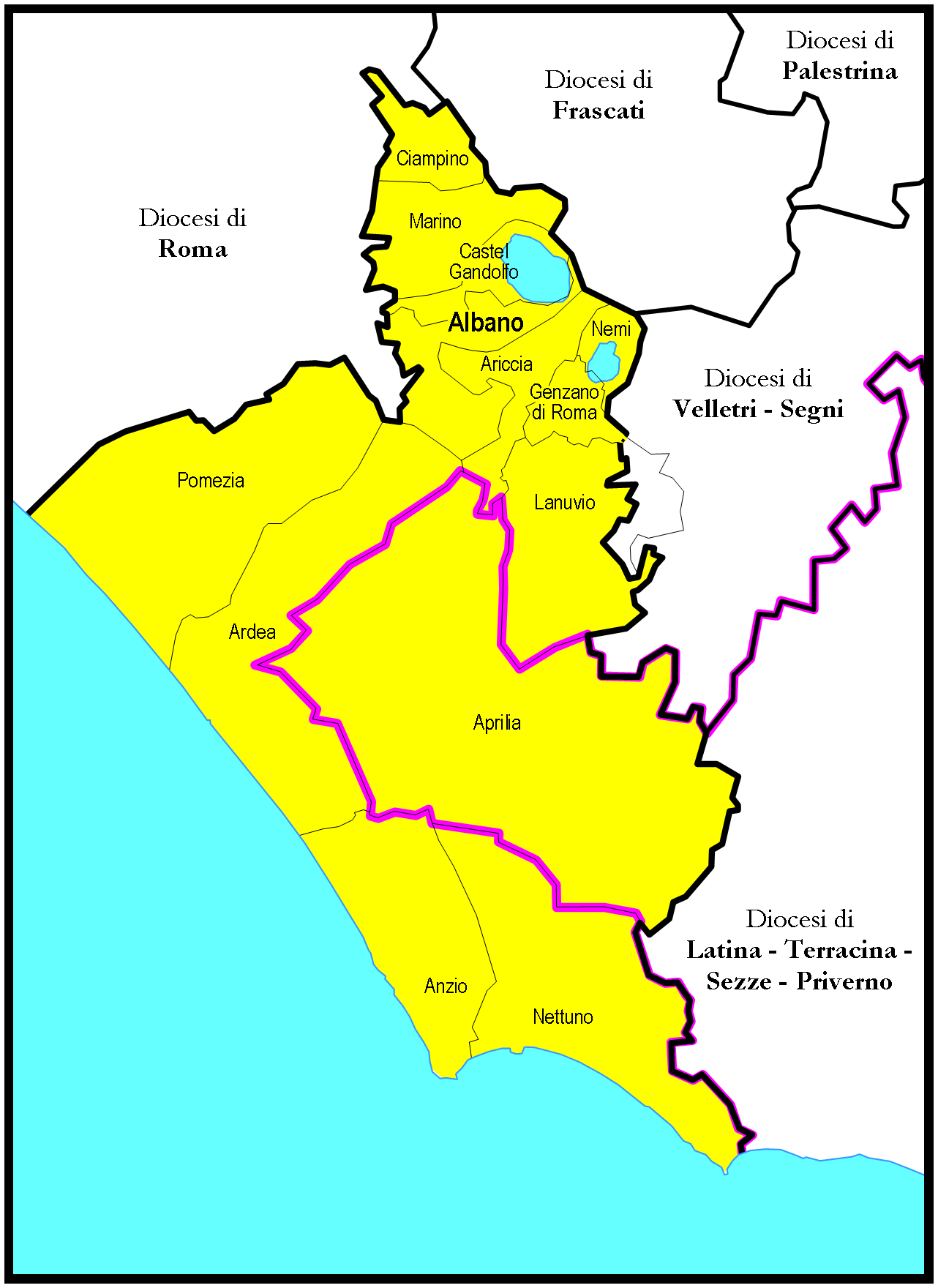

Website
- www.webdiocesi.chiesacattolica.it

The Diocese of Albano (Latin: Albanensis) is a Latin suburbicarian see of the Diocese of Rome in Italy, comprising seven towns in the Province of Rome. Albano Laziale is situated on the Appian Way some 15 kilometres (9 mi) from Rome.

Since 1966, it has both a titular bishop and a diocesan bishop.

== Early history ==
The city of Albano is located at the fifteenth milestone from Rome on the Via Appia Antiqua, and two miles from the ancient Alba Longa. A villa of Pompey the Great and a villa of the Emperor Domitian were located in the area. It had an amphitheater by the second half of the first century A.D. In 197, the Emperor Septimius Severus created the Legio II Parthica, whose headquarters was at the Castra Albana, until they were disbanded by the Emperor Constantine (306–337).

According to the Liber Pontificalis the Emperor Constantine I provided the city with a new basilica, that of Saint John the Baptist:

fecit basilicam Augustus Constantinus in civitate Albanensis, videlicet S. Joannis Baptistae.

He also presented the church with various vessels of silver and silver gilt, and endowed the church with a number of local properties, including the farm of Mola (a mile west of the town), possession of the lake of Albano, the Massa Mucii, all the abandoned houses in Albano, possession of gardens, and other properties.

This Constantinian basilica was destroyed by fire toward the end of the 8th century, or at the beginning of the 9th, along with the bishop's residence. Ferdinando Franconi has established the identity of this basilica with the present Albano Cathedral, which still contains some remains of the edifice dedicated by Pope Leo III to Saint Pancras. The cathedral was restored in 1563, and again at the beginning of the 19th century. Under the basilica there was a crypt, or confessio, from which bodies were transferred to the cemetery nearby. The cathedral is administered by a Chapter consisting of two dignities, the Archpriest and the Archdeacon, and eight Canons.

The foundation of the episcopal see of Albano may be contemporaneous with the erection of the Constantinian basilica. It is alleged that the first known bishop of the see is Dionysius (d. 355). Bishop Ursinus is found on an inscription in the Catacomb of Domitilla; the consular date is either 345 or 395. In 463, sources attest to a bishop of Albano named Romanus.

=== Catacombs ===
The importance of this early Christian community is apparent from its cemetery, discovered in 1720 by Giovanni Marangoni. It differs but little from the Christian cemeteries found in Rome. Its plan, clearly mapped out in the Epitome de locis ss. martyrum quae sunt foris civitatis Romae, is considered by Giovanni Battista de Rossi as the synopsis of an ancient description of the cemeteries, written before the end of the 6th century:

per eandem vere viam (Appiam) pervenitur ad Albanam civitatem et per eandem civitatem ad ecclesiam S. Senatoris ubi et Perpetua jacet corpore et innumeri sancti et magna mirabilia ibidem geruntur.

Saint Senator of Albano is inserted in the martyrology for 26 September (et in Albano Senatoris), without further specification. From this he passed to the Roman martyrology, where he is commemorated on the same day. But the first account of the martyrs of Albano is found in the Almanac of Philocalus (4th century) on 8 August:

VI Idus aug. Carpophori, Victorini et Severiani, Albano, et Ostense septimo ballistaria, Cyriaci, Largi, Crescentiani, Memmiae, Julianae, et Smaragdi.

The cemetery has frescoes, painted at various times by unknown artists, which show the various expressions of Christian funerary art from the fourth to the 9th century.

Pope Innocent I was a native of Albano.

== Later history ==
In the mid-19th century, the diocese of Albano contained only about 8,000 persons. It included ten castelli: Sabello, Riccia, Genzano, Cività-Lavinia, Nemi, Marino, Castelgandolfo, Pratica, Ardea, and Nettuno. At the end of the century, it contained about 44,000 inhabitants, served by 60 secular priests and 124 priests of religious orders, and there were twelve parishes. The diocese had 67 churches, chapels, or oratories. There were three collegiate churches, with colleges of Canons, at Ariccia, Civita-Lavinia, and Nemi.

By the beginning of the 20th century, it had become apparent to the papacy that the suburbicarian bishops had become overburdened with the responsibilities of their curial and diocesan duties. The increase in commerce, in roads and travel, and the migration of people to the city, as well as the increased burden of duties in the papal administration because of the mass and complexity of problems affecting the Church, made some sort of relief necessary. On his own initiative, therefore, Pope Pius X issued a decree, Apostolicae Romanorum Pontificium, granting the bishops of Ostia, Porto, Albano, Palestrina, and Frascati each a suffragan bishop to carry the burden of their pastoral duties in their dioceses. The pope appointed the suffragans, who had full powers inside the diocese, subject to the cardinal's approval, but not the power to ordain or consecrate, or the right to have a throne or display their coat-of-arms. Further details were added by Pope John XXIII in his apostolic letter, Suburbicariis sedibus, defining the suffragan bishop as "Episcopus Ordinarius", with the same powers as other residential bishops, and enumerating the privileges of the cardinal bishop.

In 1914, Pius X took steps to regulate the irregularities in the incomes of the six cardinal suburbicarian bishops. On his own initiative, after consulting with the curial cardinals and with their agreement, he issued the decree Edita a Nobis, in which he ordered that in the future the incomes of the cardinal bishops should be placed in a single fund, administered by the Office of Economic Affairs, to which each cardinal must render an annual account. Each year, after 6,000 Lire was to be given to each suffragan bishop, the remaining money collected was to be divided into equal portions, the bishop of Ostia to receive two portions, and each of the other bishops one portion. The decree also ordered that the bishop of Ostia, when promoted to that position, should also retain his previous bishopric; the diocese of Velitrae was to be removed from his jurisdiction, and from that point the suburbicarian sees would be: Ostiensis, Portuensis et Sanctae Rufinae, Albanensis, Praenestina, Sabinensis, Tusculana, Veliterna.

== List of bishops ==
=== to 1000 ===
- Ursinus (395)
- Romanus (attested 465)
- Athanasius (attested 487)
- Chrysogonus (attested 495–502)
- Homobonus (attested 592–601)
- Epiphanius (attested 649)
- Juvenalis (649–682)
- Andreas (721 – before 743)
- Tiberius (743–761)
- Leo (I) (761 – before 767)
- Eustratius (Eustathius) (761–769)
- Constantius (772 – before 826)
- Benedictus (826 – before 844)
- Petronacio (853 – ca. 867)
- Paul (869 – before 898)
- Petrus (I) (898–?)
- Gregorius (963–985)
- Teobaldo (995–996)
- Joannes (996–1001)

=== 1000–1200 ===
- Pietro Martino Boccapecora, (1004–1009), afterwards Pope Sergius IV (1009–12)
- Teobaldus (attested 1044)
- Bonifatius (1049–1068)

[Basilios]

- Peter Igneus, (1072–1089)
- Gualterius (1091–1100)
- Theodoricus (before 1098 – 1100), later Antipope Theodoric

[ Anastasius ]

- Richardus (1101–1115)
- Vitalis of Albano (c.1117–1126)
- Matthew of Albano (1126–1135)

[Hugo (1135–1136)]

- Alberto (1136–1141)
- Hugo d'Homblieres (1143)
- Pietro (1142–1146)
- Nicholas Breakspear (1146–1154), afterwards Pope Adrian IV (1154–59)
- Gualterus (1158–1178)

Joannes de Struma (1163–1168), appointed by Antipope Paschal III

- Henri de Marsiac, (1179–1189)
- Albinus, canon regular of S. Frediano, (1189–1196)

=== 1200–1400 ===
- Giovanni da Viterbo (1199 – 1210/11)
- Gerardo Sessa, O.Cist. (1211)
- Pelagio Galvani (1213–1230)
- Pietro da Collemezzo (1244–1253)
- Rodolphe de Chevrières (1261–1270)
- Bonaventura, (1273–1274)
- Bentivenga de Bentivengis, OFM (1278–1289)
- Bérard de Got (1294–1297)
- García Gudiel (1298–1299)
- Leonardo Patrasso (1300–1311)
- Arnaud d'Aux (1312–1320)
- Vital du Four, (1321–1327)
- Gauscelin de Jean (1327–1348)
- Hélie de Talleyrand-Périgord (1348–1364)
- Pierre Itier (1364–1367)
- Angelique de Grimoard de Grisac (1367–1388)
- Niccolò Brancaccio (1388–1412)

=== 1400–1600 ===
- Giordano Orsini (1412–1431)
- Pierre de Foix, OFM (1431–1464)
- Ludovico Trevisan (1465)
- Latino Orsini (1465–1468)
- Filippo Calandrini (1468–1471)
- Rodrigo Lanzol-Borja y Borja (1471–1476), later Pope Alexander VI
- Oliviero Carafa (1476–1483)
- Jean la Balu (1483–1491)
- Giovanni Michiel (1491)
- Jorge da Costa (1491–1501)
- Lorenzo Cybo de Mari (1501–1503)
- Raffaele Sansoni Galeotti Riario (1503–1507)
- Bernardino López de Carvajal (1507)
- Guillaume Briçonnet (1507–1508)
- Domenico Grimani (1508–1509)
- Philippe de Luxembourg (1509–1511)
- Jaime Serra y Cau (1511–1516)
- Francesco Soderini (1516–1517)
- Francisco de Remolins (1517–1518)
- Niccolò Fieschi (1518–1521)
- Antonio Maria Ciocchi del Monte (1521–1523)
- Pietro Accolti (1523–1524)
- Lorenzo Pucci (1524)
- Giovanni Piccolomini (1524–1531)
- Giovanni Domenico de Cupis (1531–1533)
- Andrea della Valle (1533)
- Bonifacio Ferrero (1533–1534)
- Lorenzo Campeggio (1534–1535)
- Matthäus Lang von Wellenburg (1535–1540)
- Alessandro Cesarini (1540–1541)
- Francesco Cornaro (seniore) (1541–1542)
- Antonio Pucci (1542–1543)
- Giovanni Salviati (1543–1544)
- Gian Pietro Carafa (1544–1546)
- Ennio Filonardi (1546–1549)
- Jean du Bellay (1550–1553)
- Rodolfo Pio (1553)
- Juan Álvarez de Toledo (1553–1555)
- Francesco Pisani (1555–1557)
- Pedro Pacheco de Villena (1557–1560)
- Giovanni Girolamo Morone (1560–1561)
- Cristoforo Madruzzo (1561–1562)
- Otto von Truchsess von Waldburg (1562–1570)
- Giulio della Rovere (1570)
- Giovanni Ricci (1570–1573)
- Scipione Rebiba (1573–1574)
- Fulvio Giulio della Corgna, Ordine di San Giovanni di Gerusalemme (1574–1580)
- Gianfrancesco Gambara (1580–1583)
- Alfonso Gesualdo (1583–1587)
- Tolomeo Gallio (1587–1589)
- Prospero Santacroce (1589)
- Gabriele Paleotti (1589–1591)
- Michele Bonelli, (1591–1598)
- Girolamo Rusticucci (1598–1600)
- Girolamo Simoncelli (1600)
- Pedro de Deza (1600)
- Alessandro Ottaviano de' Medici (1600–1602), later Pope Leo XI

=== 1600–1800 ===
- Simeone Tagliavia d'Aragonia (1602–1603)
- Domenico Pinelli (seniore) (1603)
- Girolamo Bernerio, Dominican (1603–1607)
- Antonmaria Sauli (1607–1611)
- Paolo Emilio Sfondrati (1611–1618)
- Francesco Sforza di Santa Fiora (1618–1620)
- Alessandro Damasceni Peretti (1620–1623)
- Giovanni Battista Deti (1623–1626)
- Andrea Baroni Peretti Montalto (1626–1627)
- Carlo Emanuele Pio di Savoia (1627–1630)
- Gaspar Borja y Velasco (1630–1645)
- Bernardino Spada (1646–1652)
- Federico Baldissera Bartolomeo Cornaro (1652–1653)
- Marzio Ginetti (1653–1663)
- Giovanni Battista Maria Pallotta (1663–1666)
- Ulderico Carpegna (1666–1671)
- Virginio Orsini (1671–1675)
- Girolamo Grimaldi-Cavalleroni (1675–1685)
- Flavio Chigi seniore (1686–1689)
- Emmanuel Théodose de la Tour d'Auvergne de Bouillon (1689–1698)
- César d'Estrées (1698–1714)
- Ferdinando d'Adda (1715–1719)
- Fabrizio Paolucci (1719–1724)
- Giacomo Boncompagni (1724–1731)
- Lodovico Pico della Mirandola (1731–1740)
- Pierluigi Carafa (1740–1751)
- Giovanni Battista Spinola (1751–1752)
- Francesco Scipione Maria Borghese (1752–1759)
- Carlo Alberto Guidobono Cavalchini (1759–1763)
- Fabrizio II Serbelloni (1763–1774)
- François-Joaquim de Pierre de Bernis (1774–1794)
- Luigi II Valenti Gonzaga (1795–1807)

=== 1800–1966 ===
- Antonio Dugnani (1807–1816)
- Michele di Pietro (1816–1820)
- Pierfrancesco Galleffi (1820–1830)
- Gianfrancesco Falzacappa (1830–1839)
- Giacomo Giustiniani (1839–1843)
- Pietro Ostini (1843–1849)
- Costantino Patrizi Naro (1849–1860)
- Lodovico Altieri (1860–1867)
- Camillo di Pietro (1867–1877)
- Carlo Luigi Morichini (1877–1879)
- Gustav Adolf von Hohenlohe-Schillingsfürst (1879–1884)
- Raffaele Monaco La Valletta (1884–1889)
- Lucido Maria Parocchi (1889–1896)
- Isidoro Verga (1896–1899)
- Antonio Agliardi (1899–1915)
- Gennaro Granito Pignatelli di Belmonte (1915–1948)
- Giuseppe Pizzardo (1948–1970)

=== Since 1966 ===
Since 1966 functions are divided between the titular bishop and the diocesan bishop.

Diocesan bishops

- Raffaele Macario (1966–1977)
- Gaetano Bonicelli (1977–1982)
- Dante Bernini (1982–1999)
- Agostino Vallini (1999–2004)
- Marcello Semeraro (2004–2020)
- Vincenzo Viva (2021–present)

Titular bishops

- Giuseppe Pizzardo (1948–1970)
- Gregorio Pietro Agagianian (1970–1971)
- Luigi Traglia (1972–1977)
- Francesco Carpino (1978–1993)
- Angelo Sodano (1994–2022)
- Robert Francis Prevost (6 February 2025 – 8 May 2025), elected Pope Leo XIV
- Luis Antonio Tagle (24 May 2025 – present)

== Books and articles ==
- Bräuer, Martin (2014). Handbuch der Kardinäle: 1846-2012 (in German). Berlin: De Gruyter. ISBN 978-3-11-026947-5.
- Brixius, Johannes M. Die Mitglieder des Kardinalskollegiums von 1130-1181, Berlin 1912.
- De Rossi, Le catacombe di Albano, in Bull. di arch. Crist. (1869).
- Cappelletti, Giuseppe (1844). Le chiese d'Italia della loro origine sino ai nostri giorni (in Italian). Vol. primo. Venezia: Giuseppe Antonelli. pp. 655–682.
- Fraikin, J. "Albano," (in French) Dictionnaire d'histoire et de géographie ecclésiastiques fascicule I (Paris: Letouzey 1909), pp. 1373-1379.
- Gams, Pius Bonifatius (1873). Series episcoporum Ecclesiae catholicae: quotquot innotuerunt a beato Petro apostolo (in Latin). Ratisbon: Typis et Sumptibus Georgii Josephi Manz. pp. xxii–xxiv.
- Gauchat, Patritius (1935). Hierarchia catholica Volumen quartum (IV) Münster.
- Giorni, Francesco (1842). Storia di Albano (in Italian). Roma: Puccinelli.
- Hüls, Rudolf. Kardinäle, Klerus und Kirchen Roms: 1049–1130, Bibliothek des Deutschen Historischen Instituts in Rom 1977.
- Jozzi, Oliverio (1901). Series pontificum Albanorum. (in Latin) Roma 1901.
- Kehr, Paul Fridolin (1907). Italia pontificia (in Latin). Vol. II: Lativm. Berlin: Weidmann. pp. 30–36. ISBN 978-5-88390-446-1.
- Klewitz, Hans-Walter. Reformpapsttum und Kardinalkolleg (in German), Darmstadt 1957.
- Leclercq, "Albano (catacombe d')," in Dictionnaire d'archeologie Chretienne et de littterature (Paris, 1904).
- Lentz, Harris M. (2009). Popes and Cardinals of the 20th Century: A Biographical Dictionary. Jefferson NC USA: McFarland. ISBN 978-1-4766-2155-5.
- Maleczek, Werner. Papst und Kardinalskolleg von 1191 bis 1216, Vienna 1984.
- Marucchi, Orazio "Di alcune inscrizioni recentement trovate e ricomposte nel cimitero di Domitilla," in Nuovo bull. di arch. crist. (1899), p. 24.
- Marucchi, Orazio (1903). Guida delle Catacombe di Albano (in Italian). Roma: Desclee, Lefebvre.
- Riccy, Giovanni Antonio (1787). Memorie storiche dell' antichissima citta di Alba-Longa e dell' Albano moderno ...: divise in tre libri (in Italian). Roma: Giovanni Zempel.
- Ritzler, Remigius; Sefrin, Pirminus (1952). Hierarchia catholica medii et recentis aevi V (1667-1730). Patavii: Messagero di S. Antonio. (in Latin)
- Ritzler, Remigius; Sefrin, Pirminus (1958). Hierarchia catholica medii et recentis aevi VI (1730-1799). Patavii: Messagero di S. Antonio. (in Latin)
- Ughelli, Ferdinando; Coleti, Niccolò (1717). Italia sacra sive De Episcopis Italiae, et insularum adjacentium (in Latin). Vol. Tomus primus (1) (editio secunda, aucta et emendata ed.). Venice: apud Sebastianum Coleti. pp. 247–278.
- Volpi, Latium Vetus, Profanum et Sacrum (Rome, 1726).
- Zenker, Barbara. Die Mitglieder des Kardinalkollegiums von 1130 bis 1159, Würzburg 1964.
