= Bérard de Got =

French bishop and Roman Catholic Cardinal

Cardinal Bérard de Got
- Cardinal-Bishop
- Diocese: Albano
- Predecessor: Bentivenga de Bentivengis
- Successor: Gundisalvus de Hinojosa

Orders
- Created cardinal: 18 September 1294 by Pope Celestine V

Personal details
- Born: Villandraut, Guienne
- Died: 27 June 1297 France ?

Bérard de Got (Latin: Berardus de Goth, de Gouth) (born Villandraut in the Gironde, in the diocese of Bordeaux, ca. 1250; died 27 June 1297) was a French bishop and Roman Catholic Cardinal. He was the son of Bérard, Lord of Villandraut, and a brother of Bertrand de Got, who became Pope Clement V.

Bérard was Archdeacon of Auch at the time of his appointment as Archbishop of Lyon in 1289. Auch had three archdeacons, the archdeacon-major and the archdeacons-minor of Montalda (Montaldensis) and Bezaume (Bezalensis). Bérard was Archdeacon of Montalda.

== Archbishop of Lyon ==
Archdeacon Bérard de Got had been elected Archbishop of Bordeaux in a double election, which had to be referred to the Pope for judgment; on 23 July 1289, to resolve the impasse, the Pope appointed neither Archbishop-elect, but instead named a third person to the See of Bordeaux, Henri de Genies. When Archbishop Henri died in 1297, his successor was Bertrand de Got, the brother of Berard de Got. It would perhaps seem that Bérard had been passed over, but this was far from the case. Instead, Pope Nicholas IV in Consistory on 23 July 1289 (the same day on which his candidacy for Archbishop of Bordeaux was rejected), named him Archbishop of Lyon. Thus, Bérard became Primate of All Gaul, Duke of Lyon, and Peer of France.

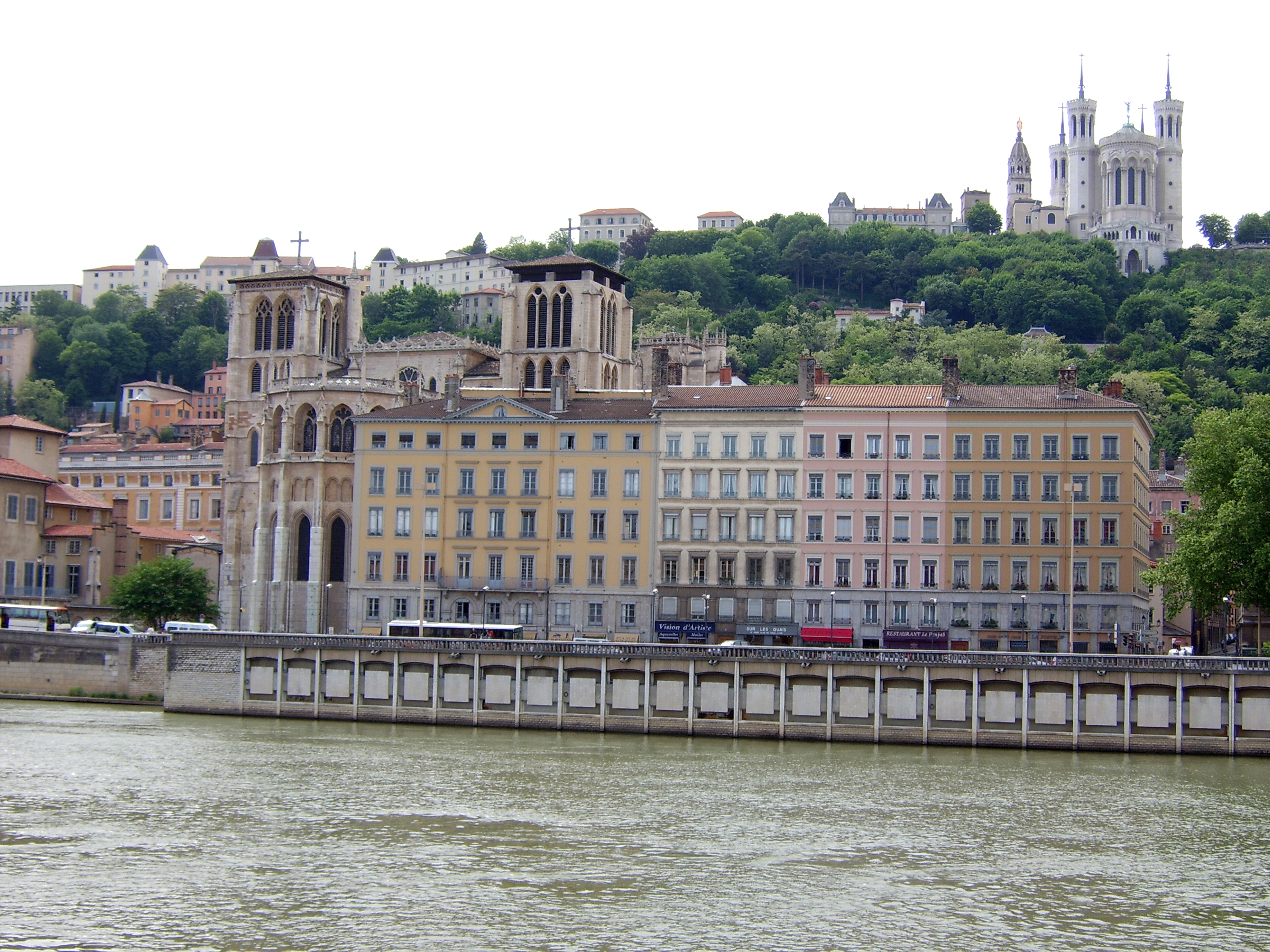
Cathedral of S. Jean de Lyon (at left)

Lyon was a serious problem for Archbishop Bérard. The diocese was saddled with considerable debt, due to the imprudent fiscal habits of several of his predecessors. Pope Nicholas was aware of the problem when he appointed Bérard, and he granted Bérard special license to appropriate the income of the first year of each of the benefices of his diocese for a period of five years in order to apply the money received to settle the debts. The Pope also wanted Archbishop Bérard to attack the abuse of a single person holding several benefices, out of greed and without papal dispensation. The Pope also demanded that those persons who held benefices should take up residence and be properly ordained. He granted the Archbishop the privilege of removing any person who had received benefices since the Council of Lyon (1274) who had not proceeded to the priesthood within a year of the Archbishop's arrival. Pope Nicholas also granted Archbishop Bérard the right to make his own Testament. Later in the same year, when the Pope was sending as Legates to France Cardinals Gerard Bianchi and Benedetto Caetani, he instructed them to settle the longstanding differences that existed at Lyon between the Archbishop and the Cathedral Chapter. But, having heard that royal officials were molesting ecclesiastical persons in the diocese of Lyon, and that some members of the Cathedral Chapter were threatening canonical censures against the Archbishop, the Pope granted the Archbishop immunity from such interferences. Two years later, the debts of the diocese of Lyon were such that Pope Nicholas allowed him to keep 3,000 livres tournois out of the annual collection of some 7,000 livres tournois which were earmarked to be sent to Rome, provided that the money be used to extinguish the debts. Politically, the situation in Lyon was improving. In March 1292 the Archbishop finally came to an agreement with the Chapter and Provost over the exercise of judicial powers in the city of Lyon.

== Cardinal Bérard ==
Archbishop Bérard de Got was created cardinal by Pope Celestine V in the Consistory of 18 September 1294, and named to the post of Bishop of Albano.

Cardinal Bérard de Got participated in the Conclave of 23–24 December 1294, which elected Cardinal Benedetto Caetani. He took the name Boniface VIII.

== Peace Mission to France and England ==
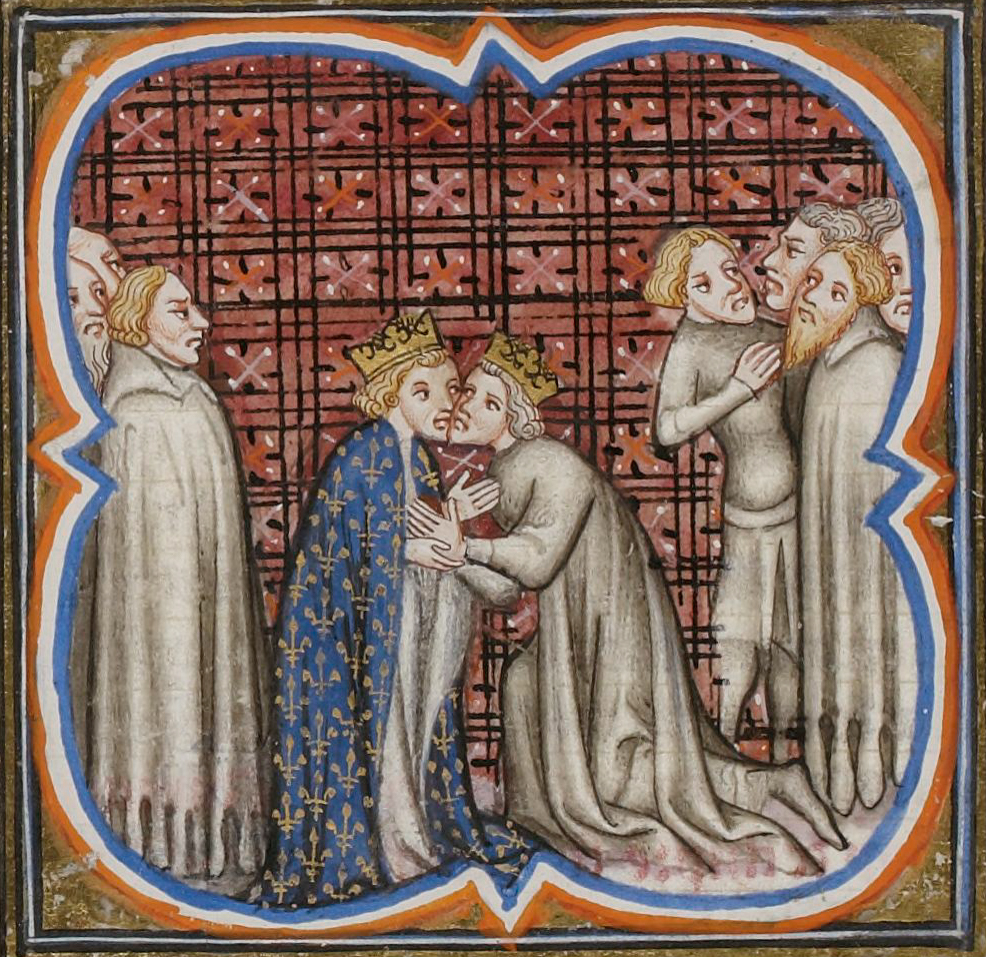
Philip IV and Edward I (1286)

On 18 February 1295, Pope Celestine's successor, Boniface VIII (Benedetto Caetani), appointed Cardinal Bérard de Got and Cardinal Simon de Beaulieu as Nuncios to King Edward I of England and King Philip IV of France to do everything possible to arrange a peace in the conflict that had broken out in the previous year. Next day the Pope sent a letter to King Edward, advising him of the appointment, and apologizing that he had not done it sooner, due to the dangerous roads between Naples, where he had been elected, and Rome, where he was crowned on 23 January 1295. King Edward lost no time in securing a friendly hearing at the Papal Court; on 6 April 1295, he wrote a letter to Cardinal Matthew of Aquasparta, replying to a letter to him from the Cardinal about a peace between England and France. The King's letter requested the Cardinal to use his influence on the King's behalf, since the King had always had peace, concord, and good will in his intentions. The Cardinal was advised to seek detailed information about the King's affairs from his Cleric, Bertrandus de Got, Papal Chaplain.

The two ambassadors, Bérard de Got and Simon de Beaulieu, arrived in London around the time of Pentecost, where they awaited the King's return from Wales, which came around August 1. The Cardinals presented the King with a request for a truce of two years. The King replied that treaty obligations to the King of the Romans forbade him to make a truce or peace without his consent. The Cardinals asked the King to obtain it, and he agreed to do so. On 14 August, the King wrote directly to Pope Boniface, rehearsing the same difficulties as well as his immense willingness. On the same day he signed a document authorizing the two Cardinals to treat for a truce with King Philip. The Cardinals returned to France around 8 September 1295. On 22 June 1295, Pope Boniface mentioned in a letter to his ambassadors to King Adolf that he had ratified a truce (treuga, not a peace) among Edward I, Philip IV, and Adolf, King of the Romans.

On 13 April 1296, the Pope approved another truce among the three Kings, to begin on 24 June 1296. On 21 April 1296, Boniface ordered the two cardinals to publish in France and England his Constitution on Ecclesiastical Liberties, Clericis laicos, which he had signed in February. In the Spring of 1296, while King Edward was still at Berwick, Cardinal Bérard returned to England to receive the King's reply as to a truce; the King, without getting the consent of the King of the Romans, could only refuse the Cardinal, who immediately returned to France. On 18 August 1296, the Pope, who had received a suggestion from King Philip IV that negotiations for peace with King Edward might better be conducted at the Papal Court, eagerly accepted the suggestion that the King send his brother the Comte d'Alençon to him so that they could deal conveniently with confidential matters. On the same day Boniface warned King Adolf not to be so hostile to Philip IV or his kingdom, and that he should direct his efforts toward peace. But on 17 September 1296, Pope Boniface seems to have given up on long-distance diplomacy; he advised King Philip and King Edward to send ambassadors (nuntii) to the Papal Court, since his ambassadors had been able to achieve nothing. In February 1297 the two cardinals, Bérard and Simon, were still in France, where they were advised that, if King Philip or his officials should obstruct the transfer of funds for the Holy Land, they were to be publicly denounced and notified that they had fallen under the appropriate ecclesiastical censures. And on 12 February 1297, King Edward was still sending representatives to discuss a truce or peace with the Cardinals. At the same time, the King was sending out summonses to his vassals, lay and ecclesiastic, to join in a war against the King of France.

== Death ==
Bérard de Got died on 27 June 1297, at a place unknown. His friend and fellow Nuncio, Simon de Beaulieu was back at the Roman Curia, and died at Orvieto on 18 August 1297, less than eight weeks after Bérard.

== Bibliography ==
- Claude François Menestrier, Histoire civile ou consulaire de la cité de Lyon (Lyon 1696).
- Jean Roy, Nouvelle histoire des cardinaux françois, ornée de leurs portraits Tome quatrième (Paris: Chez Poinçot 1788).
- H. T. Riley (editor), Thomae Walsingham, quondam monachi S. Albani, Historia Anglicana Vol. I A.D. 1272-1381 (London 1863).
- Honoré Fisquet, La France Pontificale: Metropole de Lyon: Lyon (Paris 1864).
- Paul Maria Baumgarten, "Die Cardinalsernennungen Cälastins V. im September und Oktober 1294," (Stephan Ehses, editor) Festschrift zum elfhundertjährigen Jubiläum des deutschen Campo Santo in Rom (Freiburg im Breisgau: Herder 1897) 161-169.
- Georges Digard, Les registres de Boniface VIII Tome I (Paris 1890).
- Ernest Langlois, Les registres de Nicolas IV (Paris 1905).
- Ferdinand Gregorovius, History of the City of Rome in the Middle Ages, Volume V, second edition, revised (London: George Bell, 1906).
- A. Trinci, "Il collegio cardinalizio di Celestino V," Celestino V e i suoi tempi: realta spirituale e realta politica. Atti del 4° Convegno storico internazionale L'Aquila, 26-27 agosto 1989 (ed. W. Capezzali) (L'Aquila 1990), pp. 19–34.
