= Pope Clement V =

Head of the Catholic Church from 1305 to 1314

- Bishop of Rome
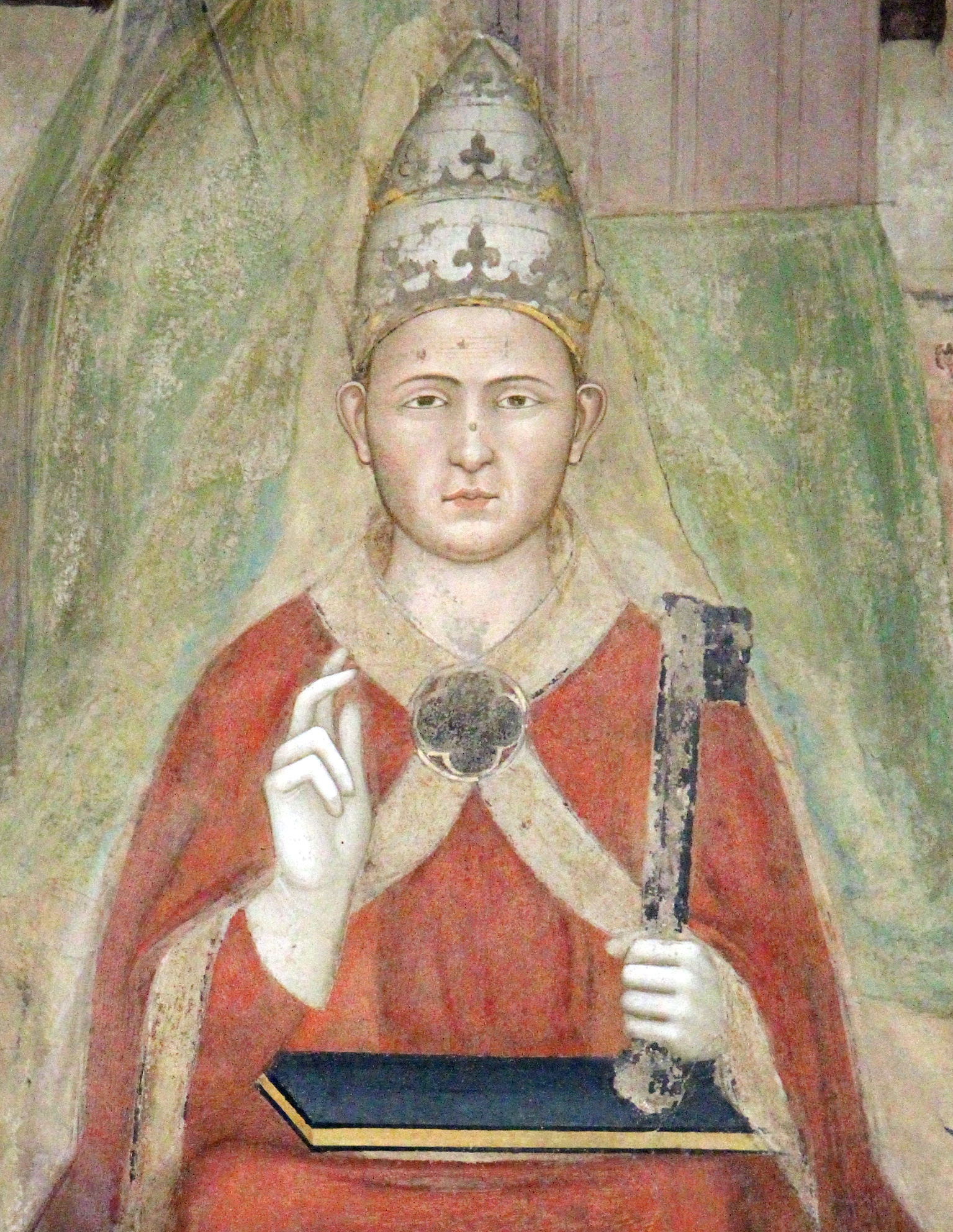
- Portrait by Andrea di Bonaiuto, c. 1366; Santa Maria Novella, Florence
- Church: Catholic Church
- Papacy began: 5 June 1305
- Papacy ended: 20 April 1314
- Predecessor: Benedict XI
- Successor: John XXII
- Previous post: Archbishop of Bordeaux

Orders
- Consecration: 14 November 1305

Personal details
- Born: Bertrand de Got c. 1264 Villandraut, Guyenne, France
- Died: 20 April 1314 (aged 49–50) Roquemaure, France
- Coat of arms: Clement V's coat of arms

Papal styles of Pope Clement V
- Reference style: His Holiness
- Spoken style: Your Holiness
- Religious style: Holy Father
- Posthumous style: None

Pope Clement V (Latin: Clemens V; born Bertrand de Got, died 20 April 1314) was head of the Catholic Church and ruler of the Papal States from 1305 until his death. He is remembered for suppressing the order of the Knights Templar and allowing the execution of many of its members. A Frenchman by birth, Clement moved the Papacy from Rome to Avignon, ushering in the period known as the Avignon Papacy.

== Early career ==
Bertrand de Got was born at Villandraut, then part of the province of Guyenne, in the mid-thirteenth century (Note: The exact date of Bertrand's birth is unknown.) to an influential Gascon family. He was the third son of Béraud de Got, lord of Villandraut, and Ida de Blanquefort. Bertrand studied the arts at Toulouse and canon and civil law at Orléans and Bologna. He became canon and sacristan of the Cathedral of Saint-André in Bordeaux, then vicar-general to his brother Bérard de Got, the Archbishop of Lyon, who in 1294 was created Cardinal-Bishop of Albano and papal legate to France. He was then made Bishop of St-Bertrand-de-Comminges, the cathedral church of which he was responsible for greatly enlarging and embellishing, and chaplain to Pope Boniface VIII, who made him Archbishop of Bordeaux in 1297.

As Archbishop of Bordeaux, Bertrand de Got was a subject of the King of England, but from early youth he had been a personal friend of Philip the Fair.

== Election ==
Following the death of Pope Benedict XI in July 1304, there was an interregnum occasioned by disputes between the French and Italian cardinals. They were equally balanced in the papal conclave, which was held at Perugia. Bertrand was elected Pope Clement V in June 1305 and crowned on 14 November. The election of moderate Bertrand, who was neither Italian nor a cardinal, was likely an act of compromise. The contemporary chronicler Giovanni Villani reports gossip that he had bound himself to King Philip IV of France by a formal agreement before his elevation, made at Saint-Jean-d'Angély in Saintonge. Whether this was true or not, it is likely that the future pope had conditions laid down for him by the conclave of cardinals.

Two weeks later at Vienne, Bertrand was informally notified of his election and returned to Bordeaux. At Bordeaux he was formally recognized as pope, with John of Havering offering him gifts from Edward I of England. Bertrand initially selected Vienne as the site for his coronation, but after Philip IV's objections selected Lyon. On 14 November 1305, Bertrand was installed as pope which was celebrated with magnificence and attended by Philip IV. Among his first acts was the creation of nine French cardinals.

Duke John II of Brittany led Clement's horse through the crowd during the coronation celebrations. So many spectators had piled atop the walls that one of the walls crumbled and collapsed on top of the duke, who died four days later.

== Pontificate ==
=== Clement V and the Knights Templar ===
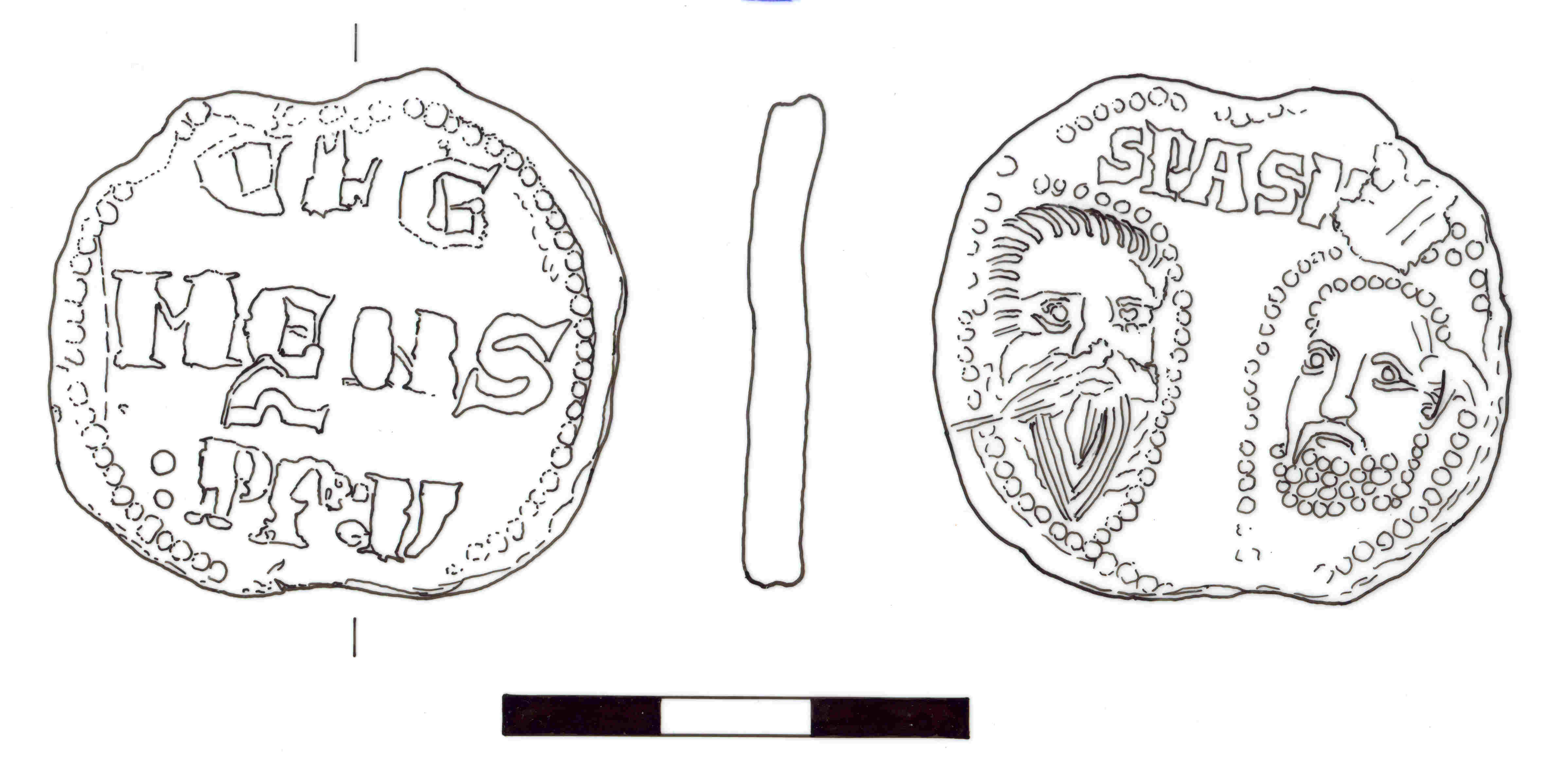
Bulla of Clement V

Early in 1306, Clement V explained away those features of the Papal bull Clericis Laicos that might seem to apply to the king of France and essentially withdrew Unam Sanctam, the bull of Boniface VIII that asserted papal supremacy over secular rulers and threatened Philip's political plans, a radical change in papal policy. Clement spent most of the year 1306 at Bordeaux because of ill-health. Subsequently, he resided at Poitiers and elsewhere.

On Friday, 13 October 1307, hundreds of the Knights Templar were arrested in France, an action apparently motivated financially and undertaken by the efficient royal bureaucracy to increase the prestige of the crown. Philip IV was the force behind this move, but it has also embellished the historical reputation of Clement V. From the very day of Clement V's coronation, the king charged the Templars with usury, credit inflation, fraud, heresy, sodomy, immorality, and abuses, and the scruples of the Pope were heightened by a growing sense that the burgeoning French State might not wait for the Church but would proceed independently.

Meanwhile, Philip IV's lawyers pressed to reopen Guillaume de Nogaret's charges of heresy against the late Boniface VIII that had circulated in the pamphlet war around the bull Unam sanctam. Clement V had to yield to pressures for this extraordinary trial, begun on 2 February 1309 at Avignon, which dragged on for two years. In the document that called for witnesses, Clement V expressed both his personal conviction of the innocence of Boniface VIII and his resolution to satisfy the king. Finally, in February 1311, Philip IV wrote to Clement V abandoning the process to the future Council of Vienne. For his part, Clement V absolved all the participants in the abduction of Boniface at Anagni.

In pursuance of the king's wishes, Clement V in 1311 summoned the Council of Vienne, which refused to convict the Templars of heresy. Nevertheless, Clement abolished the order with the bull Vox in excelso as the Templars seemed to be in bad repute and had outlived their usefulness as papal bankers and protectors of pilgrims in the East.

False charges of heresy and sodomy set aside, the guilt or innocence of the Templars is one of the more difficult historical problems, partly because of the atmosphere of hysteria that had built up in the preceding generation (marked by habitually intemperate language and extravagant denunciations exchanged between temporal rulers and churchmen), partly because the subject has been embraced by conspiracy theorists and quasi-historians.

=== Crusades and relations with the Mongols ===
Clement sent John of Montecorvino to Beijing to preach in China.

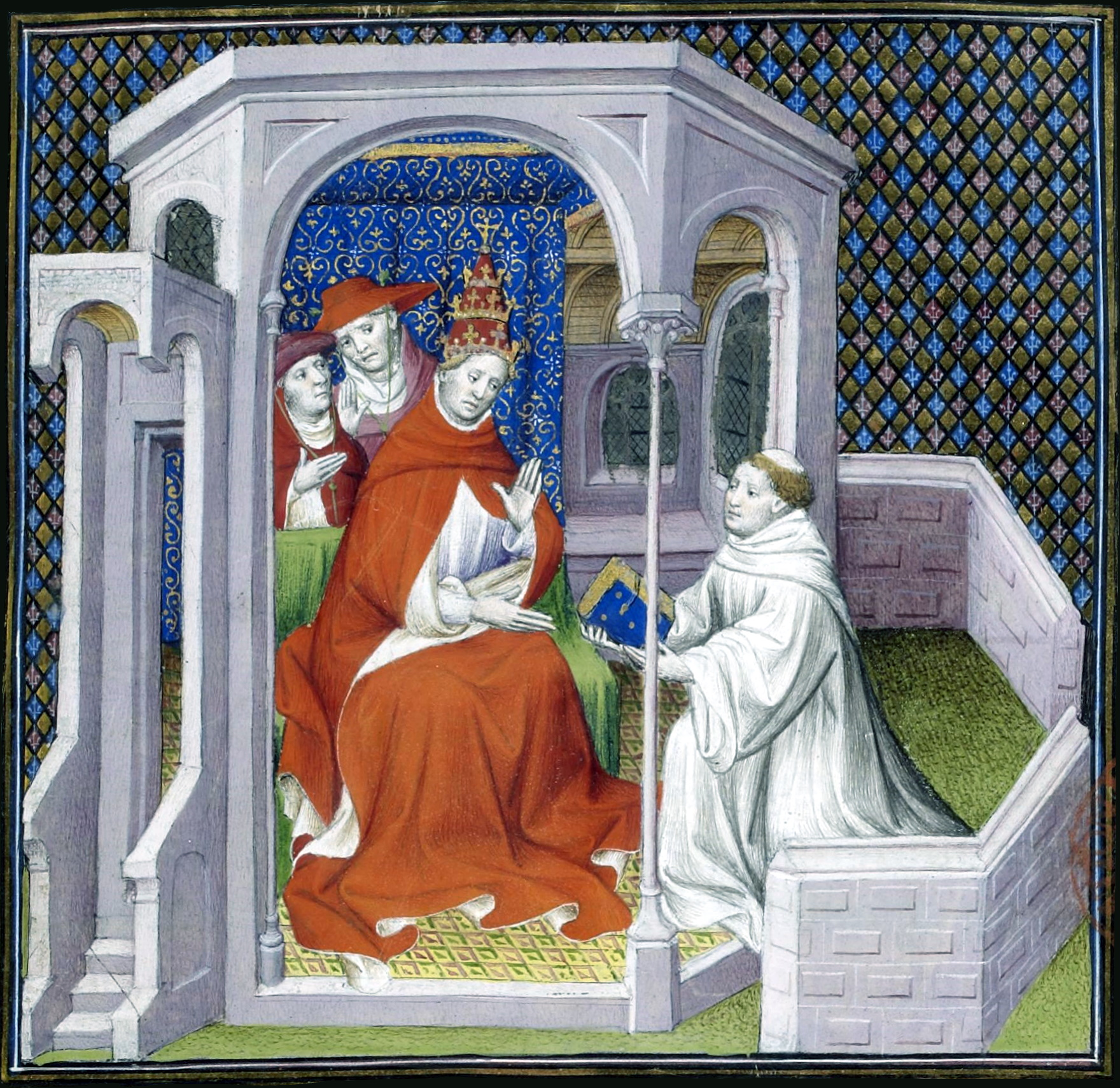
Hayton of Corycus remitting his report on the Mongols La Flor des Estoires d'Orient, to Pope Clement V in 1307.

Clement engaged intermittently in communications with the Mongol Empire towards the possibility of creating a Franco-Mongol alliance against the Muslims. In April 1305, the Mongol Ilkhan ruler Öljaitü sent an embassy led by Buscarello de Ghizolfi to Clement, Philip IV of France, and Edward I of England. In 1307, another Mongol embassy led by Tommaso Ugi di Siena reached European monarchs. However, no coordinated military action was forthcoming and hopes of alliance petered out within a few years.

In 1308, Clement ordered the preaching of a crusade to be launched against the Mamluk Sultanate in the Holy Land in the spring of 1309. This resulted in the unwanted Crusade of the Poor appearing before Avignon in July 1309. Clement granted the poor crusaders an indulgence but refused to let them participate in the professional expedition led by the Hospitallers. That expedition set off in early 1310, but instead of sailing for the Holy Land, the Hospitallers conquered the city of Rhodes from the Byzantines.

On 4 April 1312, a Crusade was promulgated by Pope Clement V at the Council of Vienne. Another embassy was sent by Oljeitu to the West and to Edward II of England in 1313. The same year, Philip IV "took the cross", making the vow to go on a Crusade in the Levant.

=== Relations with Rome ===
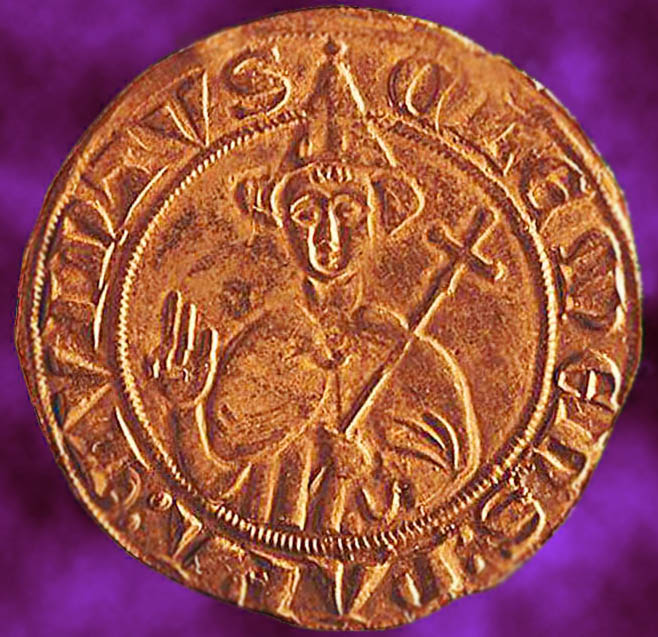
Sou coin depicting Clement V, 1310

On 9 March 1309, after several years wandering Provence and Gascony, Clement settled the curia at the Dominican priory in Avignon. The city, ruled by Charles II, count of Provence and a papal vassal, neighbored the Comtat Venaissin. This move, actually to Carpentras, the capital of the territory, was justified at the time by French apologists on grounds of security, since Rome, where the dissensions of the Roman aristocrats and their armed militia had reached a nadir and the Basilica di San Giovanni in Laterano had been destroyed in a fire, was unstable and dangerous. But the decision proved the precursor of the long Avignon Papacy, the "Babylonian captivity of the papacy", in Petrarch's phrase.

Clement V's pontificate was also a disastrous time for Italy. The Papal States were entrusted to a team of three cardinals, but Rome, the battleground of the Colonna and Orsini factions, was ungovernable. In 1310, the Holy Roman Emperor Henry VII entered Italy, established the Visconti as vicars in Milan, and was crowned by Clement V's legates in Rome in 1312 before he died near Siena in 1313.

In Ferrara, which was taken into the Papal States to the exclusion of the Este family, papal armies clashed with the Republic of Venice and its populace. When excommunication and interdict failed to have their intended effect, Clement V preached a crusade against the Venetians in May 1309, declaring that Venetians captured abroad might be sold into slavery, like non-Christians.

=== Later career and death ===
In his relations with the Holy Roman Empire, Clement was an opportunist. He refused to use his full influence to support the candidacy of Charles of Valois, brother of Philip IV, lest France became too powerful; and recognized Henry of Luxemburg, whom his representatives crowned emperor at the Lateran in 1312. When Henry, however, came into conflict with Robert of Naples, Clement supported Robert and threatened the emperor with excommunication and interdict. However, the crisis passed with Henry's unexpected death.

Other remarkable incidents of Clement V's reign include his violent repression of the Dulcinians in Lombardy, which he considered a heresy, and his promulgation of the Clementine Constitutions in 1313.

Clement died on 20 April 1314. According to one account, while his body was lying in state, a thunderstorm arose during the night and lightning struck the church where his body lay, setting it on fire. (Note: Menache states a fire started and does not mention lightning) The fire was so intense that by the time it was extinguished, the pope's body had been all but destroyed. He was buried at the collegiate church in Uzeste close to his birthplace in Villandraut, as laid down in his will.

== In popular culture ==
Stephen Fewell portrays Pope Clement V in the second season of Knightfall.

== See also ==
- Bernard Jarre
- Cardinals created by Clement V
- Châteauneuf-du-Pape
- Château Pape Clément
- Château de Roquetaillade

Catholic Church titles
Preceded by Benedict XI	Pope; 5 June 1305 – 20 April 1314	Succeeded by John XXII
