= Vital du Four =

French theologian and scholastic philosopher

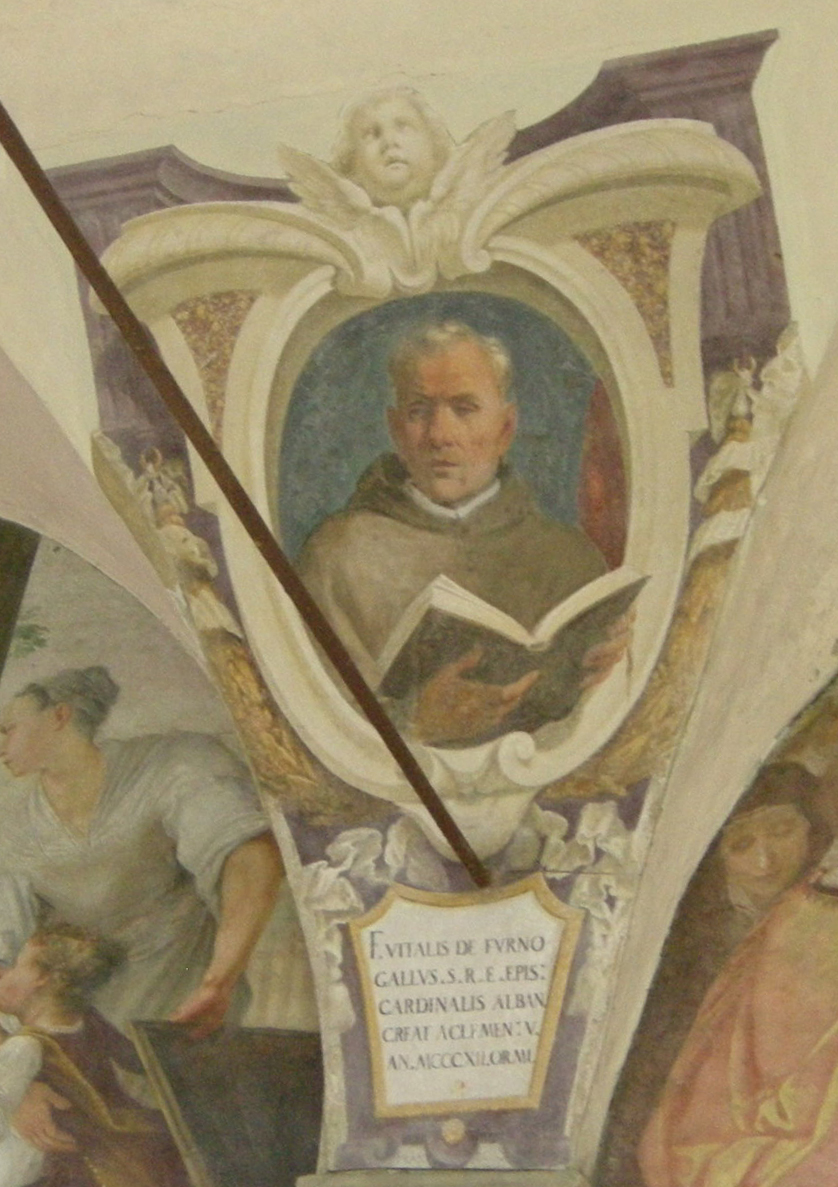
Vital du Four

Vital du Four (Bazas, 1260 – Avignon, 1327) was a French Franciscan theologian and scholastic philosopher, and prior of Eauze.

He became Cardinal in 1312 and bishop of Albano in 1321.

== Works ==
- Quaestiones disputate de rerum principio, wrongly attributed to Duns Scotus in: Quaestiones disputatae De rerum principio, tractatus De primo rerum omnium principio, novis curis edidit Marianus Fernandez Garcia, Quaracchi, 1910, pp. 1–624.

== Studies ==
- John F. Lynch, The Theory of Knowledge of Vital du Four, St. Bonaventure, Franciscan Institute Publications, 1972. ISBN 978-1-57659-103-1

== Notes ==
Catholic Church titles
Preceded by Gentile Portino da Montefiore	Cardinal-Priest of Santi Silvestro e Martino ai Monti; 1312–1321	Succeeded by Pierre des Chappes
