= Diocese of Évreux =

Diocese of the Catholic Church

Coordinates: 49°01′28″N 1°09′03″E

Diocese of Évreux Dioecesis Ebroicensis Diocèse d'Evreux

Catholic
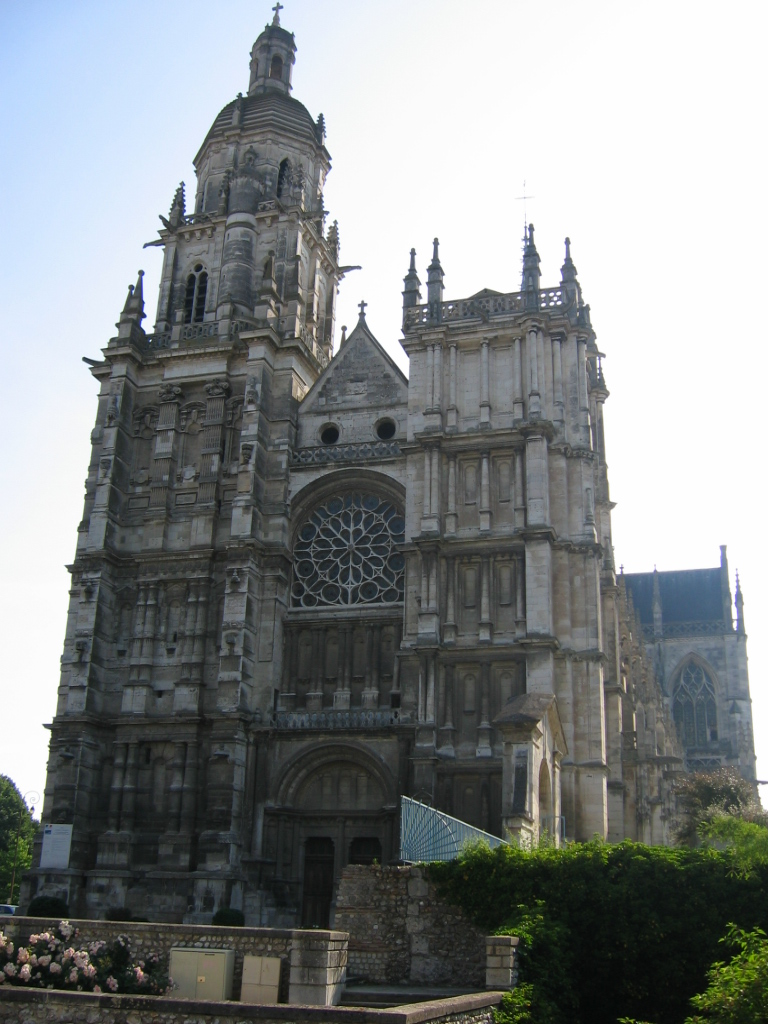
- Évreux Cathedral

Location
- Country: Rome
- Ecclesiastical province: Rouen
- Metropolitan: Archdiocese of Rouen

Statistics
- Area: 6,040 km^{2} (2,330 sq mi)
- Population: Total; Catholics: (as of 2011); 601,743; 345,300 (57.4%)
- Parishes: 33

Information
- Denomination: Roman Catholic
- Sui iuris church: Latin Church
- Rite: Roman Rite
- Established: 3rd Century
- Cathedral: Cathedral of Notre Dame in Evreux
- Patron saint: Assumption of Mary
- Secular priests: 50 (Diocesan); 7 (Religious Orders); 24 Permanent Deacons

Current leadership
- Pope: Leo XIV
- Bishop: Olivier de Cagny
- Metropolitan Archbishop: Dominique Lebrun
- Bishops emeritus: Christian Nourrichard

Map

Website
- Website of the Diocese

The Diocese of Évreux (Latin: Dioecesis Ebroicensis; French: Diocèse d'Evreux) is a Latin Church diocese of the Catholic Church in Rome. The diocese comprises the department of Eure within the Region of Normandy. The diocese is a suffragan of the Archdiocese of Rouen, and belongs to the ecclesiastical province of the same name.

In 2011, in the Diocese of Évreux there was one priest for every 6,056 Catholics.

== History ==
Tradition has it that the diocese of Évreux was founded by Saint Taurinus. That tradition claims that he was born during the reign of the Roman Emperor Domitian (81-96), and was baptized by Pope Clement I (ca, 91-101). He set out for Gaul in the company of Saint Denis, who founded the Church of Paris. He went on an embassy to Rome, where he received the blessing of Pope Sixtus (ca. 116-125), after which he returned to Gaul. Shortly after the death of Sixtus, the barbarians overran the province. The last remark, on top of the unlikeliness of the other statements, makes it clear that the story is fiction. An attempt to fix the chronology places Taurinus in the time of Sixtus II (257-258), not Sixtus I. There were indeed barbarian incursions under the Emperor Gallienus (253-268) in those years, and Saint Denis is usually put in the third century; but then the part of the story involving Taurinus' first-century origins must be jettisoned, leaving practically nothing; and one must admit that the third-century date depends on a scholarly conjecture.

Other writers suggest other dates. Chassant and Sauvage opt for dates of ca. 380–410. Le Brasseur indicates a preference for the time of the Vandals in the fifth century, but neither presents any evidence. Gams assigns a date of 412 in his list of Bishops of Évreux, and provides a day of death, 11 August. Fisquet provides a rationale for the date of 412, but it too is composed of suppositions and conjectures, not facts. In reality there are no facts at all.

There is, however, a body. The remains were discovered by an inhabitant of Évreux named Laudulphus, who had retired to a nearby cave for prayer and meditation. In a dream he heard a heavenly choir chanting that the day was the Feast of Saint Taurinus. Laudulphus set off to inform his bishop, Bishop Viator, but amazingly the bishop died before Laudulphus could tell him the tale. Laudulphus was elected Viator's successor, and he immediately had a second vision, of a column extending from heaven to a certain spot on earth, where, upon investigation, they found a tomb, conveniently supplied with the inscription: HIC REQUIESCIT BEATUS TAURINUS, PRIMUS EPISCOPUS EBROICAE CIVITATIS ('Here lies Blessed Taurinus, first Bishop of Évreux). A little wooden chapel was built on the spot, out of which grew the Abbey of Saint-Taurin. During the invasions of the Northmen under Rollo (ca. 875 ff.), the body was moved twice, first to the Auvergne and then to Castrum Laudosum (Lezoux). When the remains were taken up, the translators found the inscription just quoted, which may have given rise to an element in the traditional story. The sack of Évreux by Rollo was witnessed by Bishop Seibardus.

In the eighteenth century the Chapter of the Cathedral had a Dean, three archdeacons (Évreux, Neubourg and Ouche), a Treasurer, a Cantor, and a Penitentiary; there were thirty-one Canons, of whom the Abbot of Bec was the first. Eight of the senior canons were considered barons, and the most senior was the Baron of Angerville. There was also a Succentor and forty-five chaplains. There were some 550 parish churches in the diocese, of which eight were in Évreux itself.

== Cathedral ==
Part of the lower portion of the nave of Évreux Cathedral dates from the 11th century; the west facade with its two ungainly towers is, for the most part, the work of the late Renaissance, and various styles of the intervening period are represented in the rest of the church. A thorough restoration was completed in 1896. The elaborate north transept and portal are in the flamboyant Gothic. The choir, the finest part of the interior, is in an earlier Gothic style. Cardinal de la Balue, bishop of Évreux in the latter half of the 15th century, constructed the octagonal central tower, with its elegant spire; to him is also due the Lady chapel, which is remarkable for its finely preserved stained glass. Two rose windows in the transepts and the carved wooden screens of the side chapels are masterpieces of 16th-century workmanship.

The episcopal palace, a building of the 15th century, adjoins the south side of the cathedral. An interesting belfry, facing the handsome modern town hall, also dates from the 15th century. The church of St Taurin, in part Romanesque, has a choir of the 14th century and other portions of later date; it contains the shrine of St Taurin, a work of the 13th century.

From 1982 to 1995 the bishop of Évreux was the dissident cleric Jacques Gaillot who was subsequently demoted to the titular see of Partenia.

== Bishops ==
=== To 1000 ===
- ? Saint Taurinus (Taurin)
- ? Maximus (Mauxe)
- ? Etherius
- Gaud d'Évreux 440–480
- Maurusius 511 (Council of Orléans)
- Licinius (Councils of Orleans of 538, 541 and 549)
- Ferrocinctus attested in 557 (Council of Paris of 557)
- Viator
- Laudulfus 585
- Erminulfus 615 (attendee Council of Paris, 10 October 615)
- Waldus (Gaud) ca. 648
- Ragnericus 650
- Concessus ca. 667
- Aeternus (Ethernus, Detherus, Eterne) around 670
- Aquilinus (Aquilin) 673–695
- Desiderius (Didier) after 684, and before 692.
- Stephan c. 752
- Maurinus (attested in 762)
- Gervold 775–787 (resigned to become Abbot of Fontanelle)
- Ouen
- Joseph 833–846
- Guntbertus 847–863
- Hilduinus 864–870
- Sebardus (Sébar) 870–893
- Cerdegarius attested ca. 893 ?
- Hugo (Hugues) attested in 933
- Guichard (Guiscard, called Gunhard by Mabillon) ca. 954 – ca. 970
- Gérard (Géraud) ca. 970 – ca. 1011

=== 1000–1300 ===
- Gilbert around 1012–1014
- Hugo (Hugues) 1014–1046
- Guillaume Flertel 1046–1066
- Bauduin (Baldwin) 1066–1070
- Gilbert (d'Arques) 1071–1112 (Giffard)
- Audin de Bayeux or Ouen 1113–1139
- Rotrou de Warwick 1139–1165
- Gilles du Perche 1170–1179
- Jean (John Fitz Luke) 1180–1192
- Garin de Cierrey 1193–1201
- Robert de Roye 1201–1203
- Lucas 16 February 1203 – 30 January 1220
- Raoul de Cierrey 2 June 1220 – 18 March 1223
- Richard de Bellevue 17 July 1223 – 4 April 1236
- Raoul de Cierrey 2 June 1236 – 1 January 1243
- Jean de La Cour d'Aubergenville 1244–1256
- [Sede Vacante 1256 – 1259]
- Raoul de Grosparmi 1259–1263 (named Cardinal Bishop of Albano)
- Raoul de Chevry (Chevriers) 1263–1269
- Philippe de Chaourse 1270–1281
- Nicolas d'Auteuil 1281 – 17 May 1298
- Gaufredus (Geoffrey) de Bar 1298 – 18 April 1299
- Mathieu des Essarts 1299 – 1 October 1310

=== 1300–1500 ===
- Geoffroy du Plessis 1310 – 13 November 1327
- Adam de L'Île † 1328 (never consecrated)
- Jean du Prat 1329–1333
- Guillaume des Essarts 1333–1334
- Vincent des Essarts 1334–1335
- Geoffroy de Faé 1335–1340
- Robert de Brucourt 1340–1374
- Guillaume D`Estouteville 1374–1376
- Bernard de Caritis 1376–1383
- Philippe de Moulins 1384–1388
- Guillaume de Vallau 1388–1400
- Guillaume de Cantiers 1400–1418
- Paolo Capranica 1420–1427 (never visited Normandy)
- Martial Formier 1427–1439
- Pasquier de Vaux 1439–1443
- Pierre I. de Treignac de Comborn 1443–1463
- Guillaume de Flocques 7 January 1425 – November 1464
- Jean IV de La Balue 1464–1467
- Pierre Turpin de Crissé 1470–1473
- Jean Héberge 1473–1479
- Raoul du Faon 1479–1511

=== 1500–1700 ===
- Ambroise Le Veneur de Tillières 1511–1531
- Gabriel Le Veneur de Tillières 1531–1574
- Claude de Sainctes 1575–1591
- Jacques Davy Duperron 1591–1606 (Cardinal, 1603–1618)
- Guillaume de Péricard 1608–1613
- François de Péricard 1613–1646
- Jacques Le Noël du Perron 30 August 1646 – 17 February 1649
- Gilles Boutaut 15 November 1649 – 1661
  - Joseph Zongo Ondedei, Bishop of Fréjus (refused the royal appointment to Évreux in March 1661)
- Henri Cauchon de Maupas du Tour 1664–1680
- Louis-Joseph de Grignan 1681
- Jacques Potier de Novion 1682–1709 (before Bishop of Sisteron)

=== 1700–1800 ===
- M. de Heudicourt 1709
- Jean Le Normand 10 November 1710 – 7 May 1733
- Pierre-Jules-César de Rochechouard-Montigny (15 February 1734 – 1753) (transferred to Bayeux)
- Arthur-Richard Dillon (26 September 1753 – 18 July 1758) (transferred to Toulouse)
- Léopold-Charles Choiseul de Stainville (1758–1759)
- Louis-Albert de Lézay-Marnésia (1759–1773)
- François de Narbonne-Lara (1774–1792)
  - Robert Thomas Lindet (1791–1793) (Constitutional Bishop of l'Eure)
  - Charles Robert Lamy (1799–1801) (Constitutional Bishop of l'Eure)

=== 1802–1900 ===
- Jean-Baptiste Boulier (1802 – 30 October 1821)
- Charles-Louis Salmon du Châtelier (1821–1841)
- Nicolas-Théodore Olivier (1841–1854)
- Henri-Marie-Gaston Boisnormand de Bonnechose (1854–1858) (also Archbishop of Rouen)
- Jean-Sébastien-Adolphe Devoucoux (1858–1870)
- François Grolleau (1870–1890)
- François Hautin (1890–1893) (also Archbishop of Chambéry)
- Louis-François Sueur (1894–1896) (also Archbishop of Avignon)
- Marie-Simon-Henri Colomb (1896–1898)
- Philippe Meunier (1898–1913)

=== From 1900 ===
- Louis-Jean Dechelette (1913–1920)
- Constantin-Marie-Joseph Chauvin (1920–1930)
- Alphonse-Paul-Désiré Gaudron (1930–1964)
- Antoine Caillot (1964–1972)
- Jean Marcel Honoré (1972–1981), appointed Archbishop of Tours; future Cardinal
- Jacques Jean Edmond Georges Gaillot (1982–1995), removed and was appointed titular bishop of Partenia instead of becoming bishop emeritus of this diocese
- Jacques Louis Antoine Marie David (1996–2006)
- Christian Nourrichard (2006–2023), retired
- Olivier de Cagny (2023–Present)

== See also ==
- Catholic Church in France

== Bibliography ==
=== Reference works ===
- Gams, Pius Bonifatius (1873). Series episcoporum Ecclesiae catholicae: quotquot innotuerunt a beato Petro apostolo. Ratisbon: Typis et Sumptibus Georgii Josephi Manz. pp. 549–551. (Use with caution; obsolete)
- Eubel, Conradus, ed. (1913). Hierarchia catholica, Tomus 1 (second ed.). Münster: Libreria Regensbergiana. (in Latin) p. 234.
- Eubel, Conradus, ed. (1914). Hierarchia catholica, Tomus 2 (second ed.). Münster: Libreria Regensbergiana. (in Latin) p. 148.
- Gulik, Guilelmus (1923). Eubel, Conradus (ed.). Hierarchia catholica, Tomus 3 (second ed.). Münster: Libreria Regensbergiana. p. 190.
- Gauchat, Patritius (Patrice) (1935). Hierarchia catholica IV (1592-1667). Münster: Libraria Regensbergiana. pp. 179–180.
- Ritzler, Remigius; Sefrin, Pirminus (1952). Hierarchia catholica medii et recentis aevi V (1667-1730). Patavii: Messagero di S. Antonio. pp. 191.
- Ritzler, Remigius; Sefrin, Pirminus (1958). Hierarchia catholica medii et recentis aevi VI (1730-1799). Patavii: Messagero di S. Antonio. p. 204.

=== Studies ===
- Bonnin, Théodose (1845). Opuscules et melanges historiques sur la ville d'Evreux et le département de l'Eure (in French). Evreux: J. Ancelle.
- Burey, Vicomte de (1890). Les archives héraldiqes d'Évreux (in French). Evreux: Hérissey.
- Chassant, Alphonse; Sauvage, G. Ern (1846). Histoire des évêques d'Évreux: avec des notes et des armoiries (in French). Evreux: Tavernier.
- Debidour, Louis (1908). Essai sur l'histoire de l'abbaye bénédictine de Saint-Taurin d'Évreux jusqu'au XIVe siècle (in French). Evreux: Imp. Ch. Hérissey.
- Duchesne, Louis (1910). Fastes épiscopaux de l'ancienne Gaule: II. L'Aquitaine et les Lyonnaises. Paris: Fontemoing. pp. 225–230.
- Dudo (Dean of St. Quentin); Eric Christiansen, ed., tr., notes (1998). History of the Normans. Woodbridge Suffolk UK: Boydell & Brewer Ltd. ISBN 978-0-85115-552-4.
- Fisquet, Honoré (1864). La France pontificale (Gallia Christiana): Métropole de Rouen: Évreux (in French). Paris: Etienne Repos.
- Fossey, Jules (1898). Monographie de la cathédrale d'Évreux (in French). Evreux: l'Eure.
- Gallia Christiana: In Provincias Ecclesiasticas Distributa (in Latin). Vol. Tomus XI. de provincia Rotomagensi. Paris: Typographia Regia. 1759. pp. 564–673. Instrumenta, pp. 123–152.
- P.-F. I, ed. (1861). Almanach historique et liturgique du Diocèse d'Evreux (in French). Vol. 3. Evreux: Cornemillot.
- Le Brasseur, Pierre (1722). Histoire civile et ecclesiastique du Comte d'Evreux (in French). Paris: François Barois.
- Société bibliographique (France) (1907). L'épiscopat français depuis le Concordat jusqu'à la Séparation (1802-1905). Paris: Librairie des Saints-Pères.
- Winkles, Benjamin; Garland, Robert (1837). French cathedrals. From drawings by R. Garland, with an historical and descriptive account. London: Charles Tilt. pp. 125–137.

=== External links ===
- (in French) Centre national des Archives de l'Église de France, L’Épiscopat francais depuis 1919, retrieved: 2016-12-24.
