= Raoul de Grosparmy =

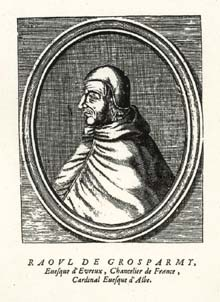
Portrait of Raoul de Grosparmy

Raoul de Grosparmy, (Grosparmi) (? in Périers – 10 August 1270 outside Tunis), was a Roman Catholic Bishop and Cardinal in the 13th century. He is sometimes confused with his successor in Évreux, and called Raoul de Chevriêres.

== Biography ==
Grosparmy was a canon in the chapter of Bayeux Cathedral and served as Keeper of the Seal to King Louis IX of France between 1253 and 1260. In 1259, he was elected Bishop of Évreux and consecrated the abbey church of Saint-Taurin in the presence of the King on 19 October 1259.

Grosparmy traveled to Rome on a diplomatic mission for the King in 1260. On 17 December 1261, he was consecrated Cardinal-Bishop of Albano by Pope Urban IV. In the following years, he served in Papal service, for which he gave up his ecclesiastical office in France. In 1264/1265, he participated in the Conclave that elected Pope Clement IV. After the defeat and death of the Hohenstaufen King Manfred of Sicily, Raoul was entrusted with the reorganization of ecclesiastical affairs in the Kingdom of Sicily, as Papal legate from 1266 to 1268.

Pope Clement IV (died 1268) appointed Grosparmy legate for the Eighth Crusade, led by King Louis IX of France. Grosparmy died of dysentery in August 1270 during the Siege of Tunis, a few days before the King.

== Sources ==
- Salvador Miranda: The Cardinals of the Holy Roman Church
- Catholic Hierarchy
- Persée: Raoul Grosparmi, l'intime normand de saint Louis (années 1254-1262) by Pascal Montaubin
