= Saint Victorinus =

Saint Victorinus may refer to:

- Victorinus of Pettau, bishop and third century Christian writer
- Victorinus of Camerino, bishop and saint
- Victorinus, bishop of Assisi and martyr
- Victorinus, martyr and saint who was a companion of Placidus
- Victorinus, martyr and saint who was a companion of Maximus of Evreux
