= Theuville =

Theuville may refer to the following places in France:

- Theuville, Eure-et-Loir, a commune in the Eure-et-Loir department
- Theuville, Val-d'Oise, a commune in the Val-d'Oise department
