= Geoffroy Faé =

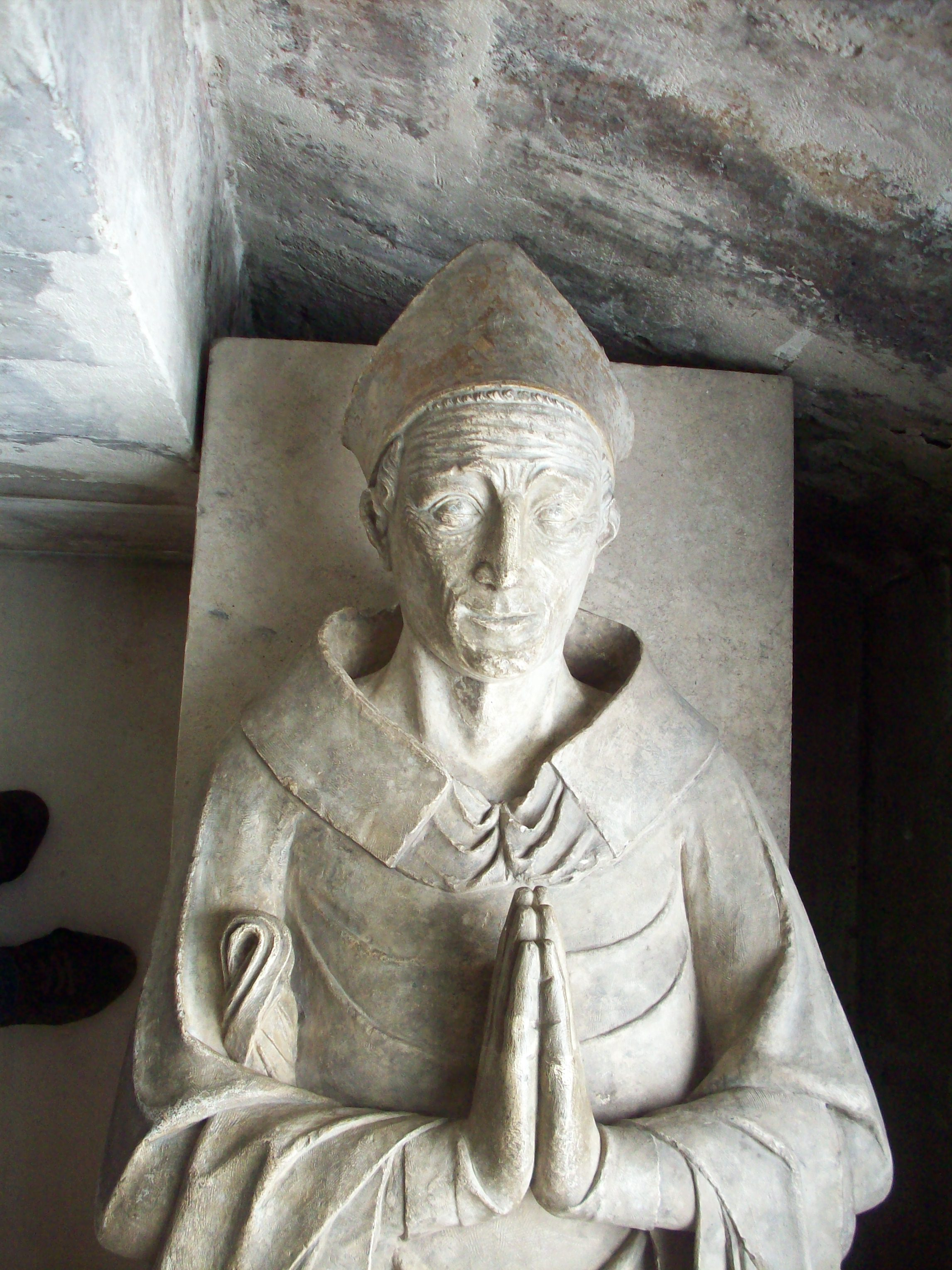
Tomb featuring Geoffroy Faé

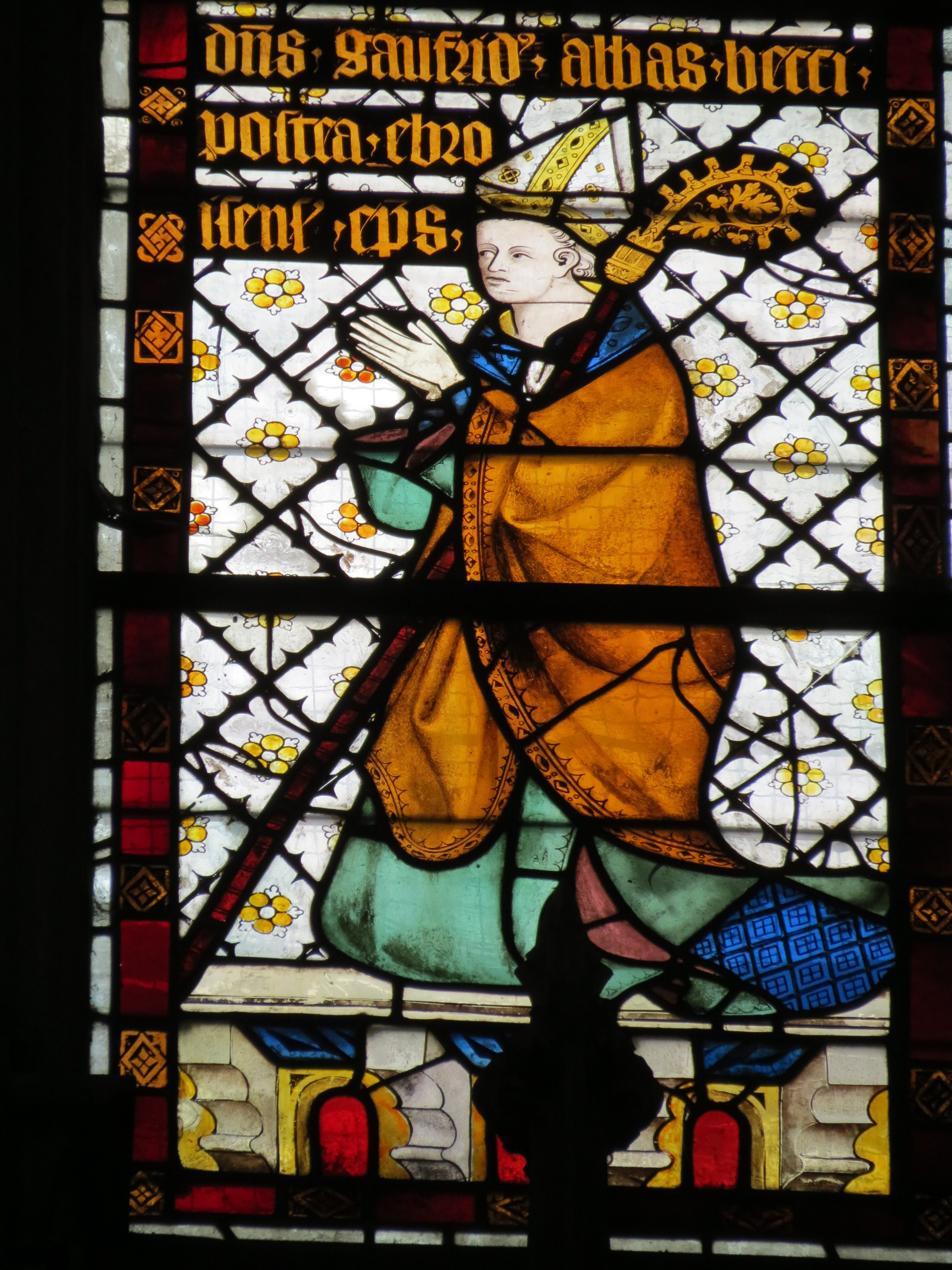
Memorial Window of Geoffroy Faé

Geoffroy Faé or de Faé (Latin: Gaufridus; died 1341) was a French Catholic abbot and bishop. Faé was elected on April 1, 1335, as bishop of Évreux, and was formerly a monk of Beaumont-le-Roger and prior of Notre-Dame-de-Bonne-Nouvelle.

== Biography ==
A former monk of Beaumont-le-Roger (priory of the Holy Trinity) and prior of Bonne-Nouvelle, he was elected on August 29, 1327, the 20th abbot of Bec. He retained this function until June 23, 1335.

On April 1, 1335, he was elected bishop of Évreux. During his episcopate, he enlarged the cathedral of Évreux, in particular the choir.

He died on April 15, 1341, and was buried to the left of the choir of the abbey church of Le Bec. Today, his recumbent figure is kept in the new abbey.
