= Audoen =

Bishop of Evreux

- Bishop of Évreux
- Elected: 1113
- Term ended: 1139

Personal details
- Born: Condé-sur-Seulles, France
- Died: 2 July 1139 Merton Priory, England
- Parents: Anger

Audoen (sometimes Audin or Ouen) was a medieval Bishop of Évreux in Normandy. He was the son of Anger, a canon of London, and brother of Thurstan, the Archbishop of York. Audoen served as bishop from 1113 to 1139.
