= Licinius of Évreux =

Licinius of Évreux was a sixth-century bishop of Évreux in the Frankish kingdom and is traditionally counted as the fifth bishop of the diocese. Very little is known about his life or episcopate beyond his participation in several important ecclesiastical councils.

Licinius is recorded as a signatory of the Third Council of Orléans in 538, the Fourth Council of Orléans in 541, and the Fifth Council of Orléans in 549. His repeated appearance among the bishops attending these assemblies provides evidence that he remained bishop of Évreux throughout at least the period from 538 to 549. The Diocese of Évreux's own chronological list places Licinius between Maurusius, who attended the Council of Orléans in 511, and Ferrocinctus, who is recorded later in the sixth century.
