= 1264–1265 papal election =

Election of Catholic Pope Clement IV

Papal election 1264–65

Dates and location
- 12 October 1264 – 5 February 1265; Perugia

Key officials
- Protopriest: Simone Paltanieri

Elected pope
- Gui Foucois; Name taken: Clement IV
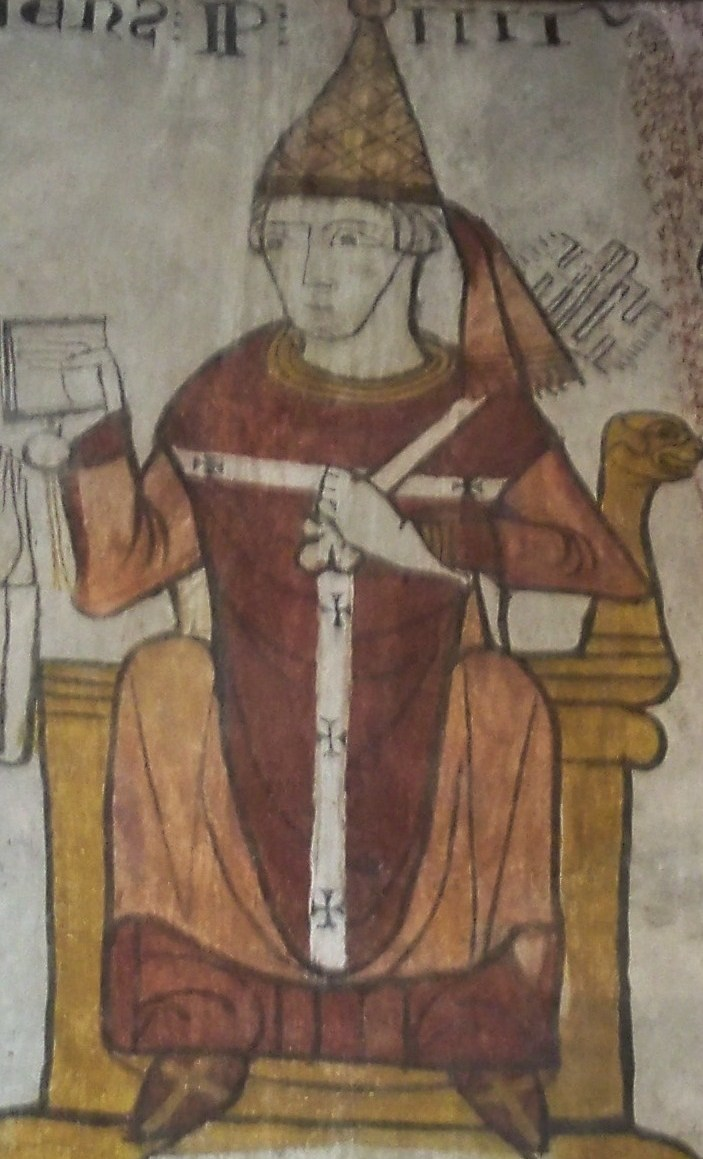

The 1264–65 papal election (12 October 1264 – 5 February 1265) was convened after the death of Pope Urban IV and ended by electing his successor Pope Clement IV. It met in Perugia, where Urban IV had taken refuge after being driven out of Orvieto. He had never been in Rome as Pope, but spent his entire reign in exile. It was the second election in a row where a pope was elected in absentia; the phenomenon would be repeated in the Conclave of 1268–1271, and again in the Conclave of 1292–1294. In the last two cases, the person elected was not even a Cardinal.

According to Salimbene di Adam, the archbishop of Ravenna, Filippo da Pistoia, had hopes of being elected.

== Cardinals ==
At the time of Pope Urban's death there were twenty-one cardinals. At least two did not attend the Election, Cardinal Simon de Brion, Legate to King Philip III of France, and Cardinal Guido Grosso Fulcodi, Legate to King Henry III. Cardinal Simon Paltineri, governor of Campania for Urban IV and later for Clement IV, might or might not have attended.

Elector	Origins	Order	Title	Date of creation	by Pope	Notes
Odo of Chateauroux, O.Cist.	Castro Radulfi, Diocese of Bourges	Cardinal-Bishop	Bishop of Tusculum (Frascati)	28 May 1244	Innocent IV	on 8 July 1255 he was appointed to the committee to judge Joachim de Fiore.
John of Toledo (John Tolet)	English	Cardinal-Bishop	Bishop of Porto	28 May 1244	Innocent IV	A supporter of Henry III of England; served sixty years in the Roman Curia
Stephanus de Vancsa (Istvan Bancsa)	Hungary	Cardinal-Bishop	Bishop of Palestrina	December 1251	Innocent IV	Archbishop of Strigonia (Esztergom) (1243–1254)
Raoul Grosparmi† (Rodolphe de Chevriêres)	French	Cardinal-Bishop	Albano	17 December 1261	Urban IV	He accompanied king Louis IX of France in his crusade in Tunisia and died there on 11 August 1270
Henry of Segusio	Piedmontese (from Susa)	Cardinal-Bishop	Bishop of Ostia and Velletri	May 1262	Urban IV	
Hughes de Saint-Cher, OP	Vienne, Dauphiné	Cardinal-priest	Title of Santa Sabina on the Aventine	28 May 1244	Innocent IV	Legate in Germany, 1253
Simone Paltanieri (or Paltinieri, or Paltineri)	Paduan	Cardinal-priest	Ss. Silvestro e Martino ai Monti	17 December 1261	Urban IV	Cardinal Protopriest, Prior Presbyterorum
Simon Monpitie de Brie	French	Cardinal-priest	S. Cecilia	17 December 1261	Urban IV	Future Pope Martin IV
Annibale Annibaldi, O.P.	Roman	Cardinal-priest	Ss. XII Apostoli	May 1262	Urban IV	Treated with Philip III of France and Charles I of Naples
Anchero Pantaleone	French	Cardinal-priest	S. Prassede	May 1262	Urban IV	Nephew of Urban IV
Guillaume de Bray	French	Cardinal-priest	S. Marco	May 1262	Urban IV	
Guy de Bourgogne, O.Cist.	Burgundian or Castilian	Cardinal-priest	S. Lorenzo in Lucina	May 1262	Urban IV	
Riccardo Annibaldi	Roman	Cardinal-deacon	S. Angelo in Pescheria	1237	Gregory IX	Archpriest of the Vatican Basilica.
Ottaviano degli Ubaldini	Florence	Cardinal-deacon	Santa Maria in Via Lata	28 May 1244	Innocent IV	Apostolic Legate in the Kingdom of Sicily, from January 1255.
Giovanni Gaetano Orsini	Rome	Cardinal-deacon	S. Niccolo in Carcere	28 May 1244	Innocent IV	Alexander IV assigned him the tituli of S. Crisogono and S. Maria in Trastevere in commendam on 22 June 1259 future Pope Nicholas III (1277–1280)
Ottobono Fieschi	Genoa	Cardinal-deacon	S. Adriano	December 1251	Innocent IV	Archpriest of S. Maria Maggiore. Archdeacon of Reims.
Uberto Coconati	Piedmontese (from Asti)	Cardinal-deacon	S. Eustachio	17 December 1261	Urban IV	
Giacomo Savelli	Roman	Cardinal-deacon	S. Maria in Cosmedin	17 December 1261	Urban IV	
Goffredo da Alatri	Alatri	Cardinal-Deacon	S. Giorgio in Velabro	17 December 1261	Urban IV	
Giordano dei Conti Pironti da Terracina†	Terracina	Cardinal-Deacon	Ss. Cosma e Damiano	May 1262	Urban IV	Died in October 1269, Vice-chancellor
Matteo Rosso Orsini	Roman	Cardinal-Deacon	S. Maria in Portico	May 1262	Urban IV	Nephew of Pope Nicholas III

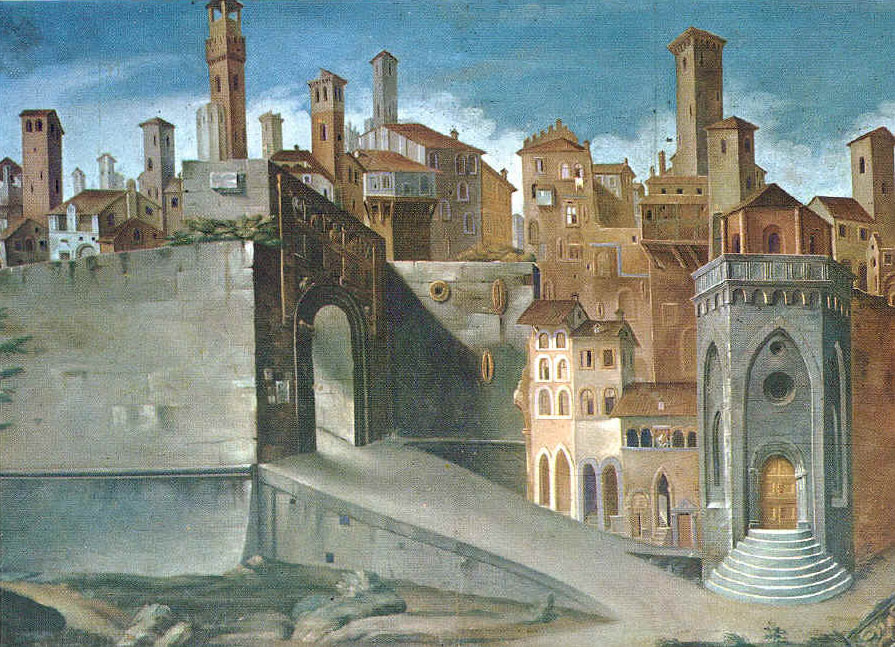
Perugia cityscape (15th century)

== Bibliography ==
- Jean Roy, Nouvelle histoire des cardinaux françois Tome quatrième (Paris: Poincot 1787).
- Lorenzo Cardella, Memorie storiche de' cardinali della Santa Romana Chiesa Tomo primo, Parte secondo (Roma: Pagliarini 1792).
- Joseph Maubach, Die Kardinäle und ihre Politik um die Mitte des XIII. Jahrhunderts (Bonn: Carl Georgi, 1902).
- Joseph Heidemann, Papst Clemens IV. (Münster 1903).
- Augustin Demski, Papst Nikolaus III, Eine Monographie (Münster 1903).
- Richard Sternfeld, Der Kardinal Johann Gaetan Orsini (Papst Nikolaus III.) 1244-1277 (Berlin: E. Ebering 1905).
- E. Jordan, "Promotion de cardinaux sous Urbain IV," Revue d'histoire et de littérature religieuses 5 (1900) 322–334.
- K. Hampe, Urban IV. und Manfred (1261–1264) (Heidelberg, 1905),
- Ferdinand Gregorovius, History of Rome in the Middle Ages Volume V. 2, second edition, revised (London: George Bell, 1906), Book X, Chapter 1, pp. 335–358.
- Francis Roth, OESA, "Il Cardinale Riccardo Annibaldi, Primo Prottetore dell' Ordine Agostiniano," Augustiniana 2 (1952) 26–60.
