= Aquilinus of Évreux =

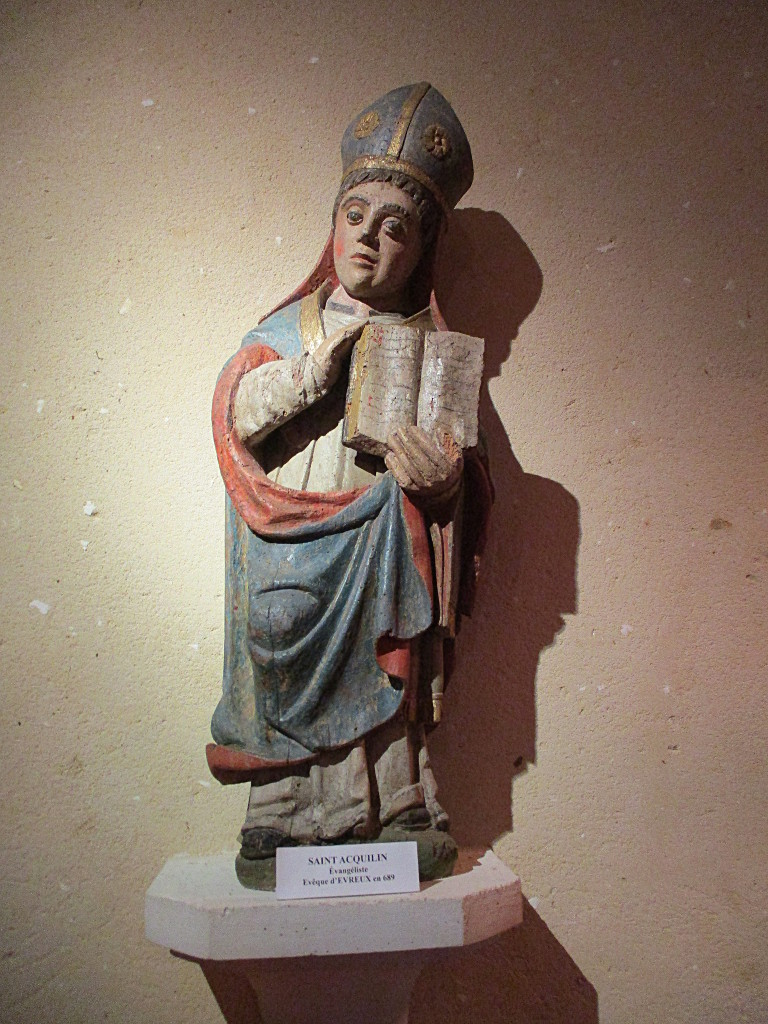
Statue of Saint Aquilin (Aquilin d'Evreux)

Saint Aquilinus (French: Aquilin) (ca. 620–695) was a Frankish bishop and hermit. Born in Bayeux, he had been a warrior in the service of Clovis II and married in 660 at Chartres. He moved to Évreux with his wife, and both cared for the poor and sick in this town. In 670, he was named bishop of the city, but Aquilinus preferred to live as a hermit. His feast day is 19 October.

== See also ==
- Conrad of Piacenza, beatified married hermit
- Gummarus, married hermit saint
- Poustinia
