= Gaud d'Évreux =

Bishop of Evreux from 440 to 480

Saint Gaud d'Évreux

Bishop
- Born: circa 400; Evreux
- Died: 491
- Feast: 30 January - Normandy; 31 January - Evreux

Saint Gaud (or Waldus) (died 491) was Bishop of Evreux from 440 to 480. His feast is 30 January.

== Biography ==
Saint Gaud was born to a wealthy Breton family around the year 400. Touched by the profanations perpetrated by the inhabitants after the death of Saint Taurin, he undertook to restore the Christian religion in his region. He immediately preached the gospel in the towns and countryside, and built churches.

Germanus of Rouen appointed him Bishop of Evreux, a position he held for about 40 years before retiring in 480 to live as a hermit. At first he built a hermitage near Guichainville, but as the faithful continued to seek him out, he moved to Scissy where the forest then covered part of Mont-Saint-Michel Bay. He died in 491.

In the year 1131, while digging the foundations of the current bell tower of the church of Saint-Pair-sur-Mer, a sarcophagus was discovered, containing human bones, and a stone bearing the inscription: "Here rests the Blessed Gaud." There is an altar is dedicated to him there. Saint-Pair-sur-Mer celebrates his feast day on the last Sunday in January when the shrine with his relics is carried in procession.

According to legend, the miracles that occurred near his relics were innumerable; the people paid tribute to him by the following adage: "Blessed Saint Gaud heals all evils". Parents came there to have their children's swaddles blessed and thus protect them from disease.

Saint Gaud is a patron invoked against nervous diseases of small children, and depression.

A church is also dedicated to him in Normanville, Normandy.

== Source ==
- Laurent Rouault: Abrégé de la vie de saint Gaud, evesque d'Evreux... (originally published 1734).
- Hippolyte Gancel: Les saints qui guérissent en Normandie, 2006.
