= Laudulfus =

Laudulfus was a Pre-congregational saint and 5th century bishop of Normandy, France.

== Biography ==
His legend relates that Laudulfus was travelling from the countryside to Mette, when he heard heavenly voices, which cheering and telling him "Today is the feast day of St. Taurinus, whose tongue shines in the church." He reported this to his Bishop Viator, and he joined the monastery founded by Taurinus. Viator soon died and the chapter selected Laudulfus to be Viators successor.

At that time the grave of St. Taurinus, was still unknown, so Laudulfus implored God day and night for one year, for the revelation of the relics of St. Taurinus. One day while travelling near Évreux, Laudulfus heard the heavenly voices again. He then noticed a column of fire, reaching from the earth to the sky. When they dug at that spot they discovered the grave of Taurinus.

Soon a church basilica was built in honor of St. Taurinus and a monastery was founded on that spot.

Laudulfus was succeeded by Erminulfus. His feast day is August 13.
