= Évreux Cathedral =

Catholic cathedral in Normandy, France

Coordinates: 49°1′27″N 1°9′3″E

Évreux Cathedral Cathédrale Notre-Dame d'Évreux
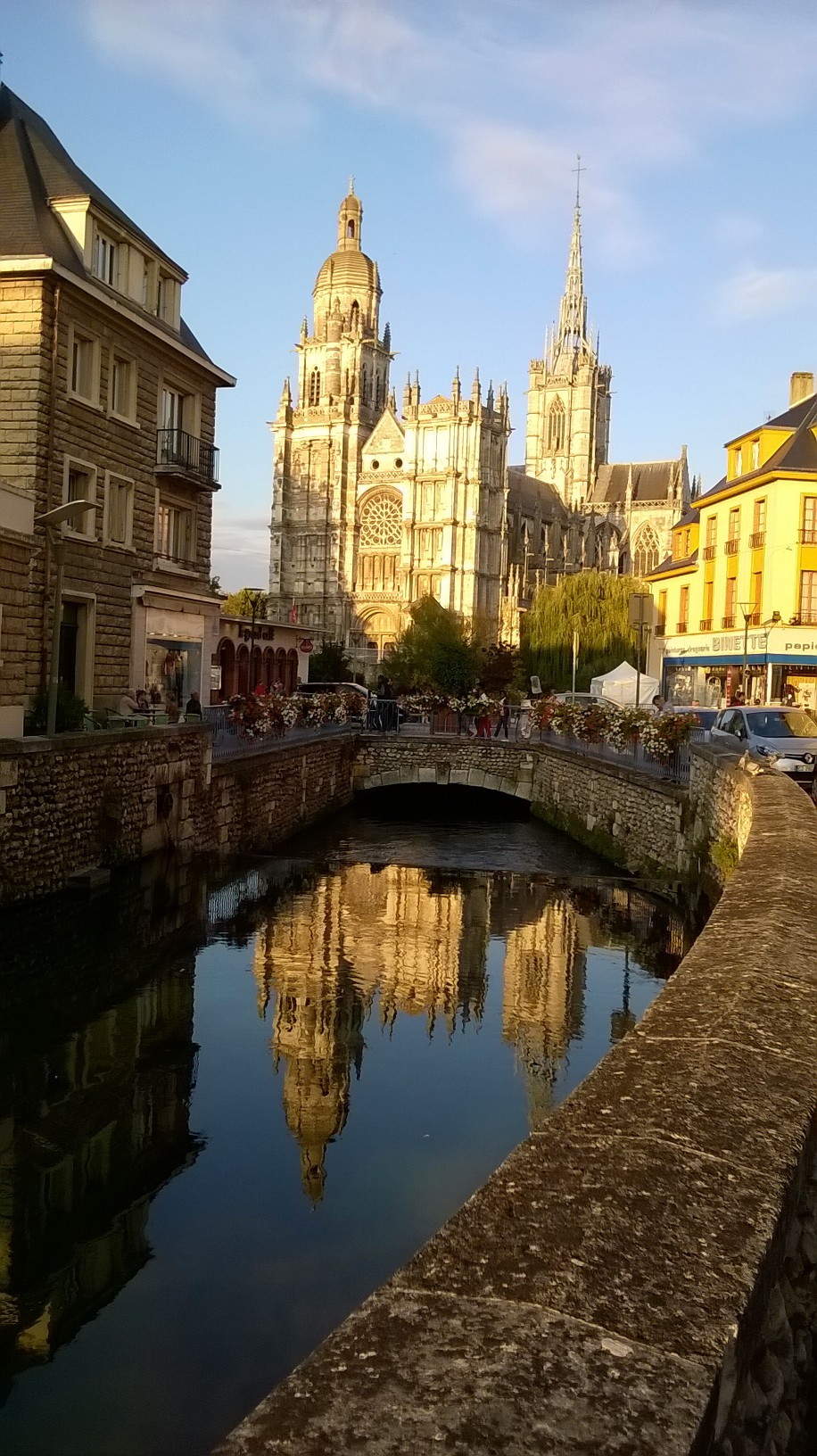
- Évreux Cathedral

Religion
- Affiliation: Catholic Church
- Province: Diocese of Évreux
- Region: Normandy
- Ecclesiastical or organisational status: Cathedral
- Status: Active

Location
- Location: Évreux, France
- Interactive map of Évreux Cathedral; Cathédrale Notre-Dame d'Évreux

Architecture
- Type: church
- Style: Renaissance, Gothic, late Gothic (Flamboyant)
- Groundbreaking: 11th century
- Completed: 19th century

Évreux Cathedral, otherwise the Cathedral of Our Lady of Évreux (French: Cathédrale Notre-Dame d'Évreux), is a Catholic church located in Évreux, Normandy, France. The cathedral is a national monument and is the seat of the Bishop of Évreux.

== Building description ==
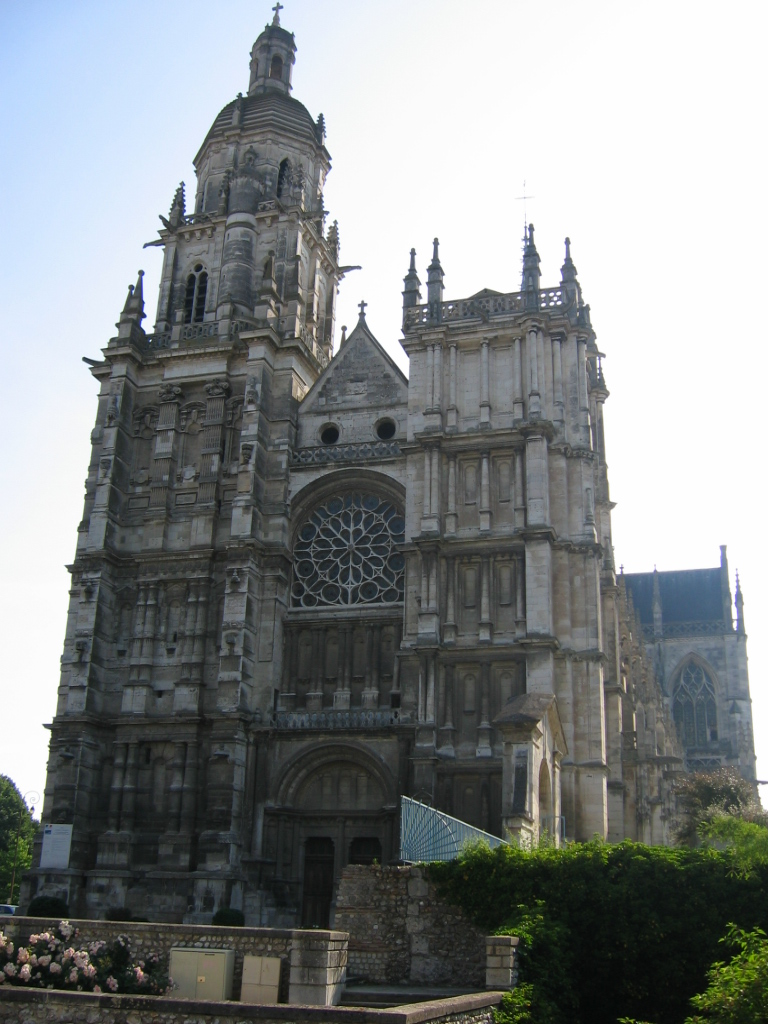
Évreux Cathedral, west front

The cathedral is devoted to Notre-Dame at Evreux, which is 80 km west of Paris. Built in the 10th century, the nave retains the semi-circular arcades from the Romanesque period. Part of the lower portion of the nave dates from the 11th century. A fire in 1119 destroyed much of the earlier building. Master of the work in 1253 was Gautier de Varinfroy, who also worked on Saint-Étienne de Meaux. Varinfroy worked on the upper levels of the nave.

The west façade, with its two towers, is mostly from the late 16th century. The north tower is the bell tower. Its foundation is said to have been laid in 1392, and to have been finished in 1417. Various styles of the intervening period are represented in the rest of the church.

The elaborate north transept and portal are in the late Gothic flamboyant style; the choir, the finest part of the interior, is in an earlier Gothic architectural style. Jean Balue, bishop of Évreux in the second half of the 15th century, constructed the octagonal central tower, with its elegant spire. In August 1465, King Louis XI granted Bishop Balue a subsidy from the gabelle to allow him to resume work on the restoration of the cathedral, which had begun under the patronage of Charles VII but which had ceased from lack of funds. To Balue is also due the Lady chapel, which is remarkable for its finely preserved stained glass. Two rose windows in the transepts and the carved wooden screens of the side chapels are masterpieces of 16th-century workmanship. The windows also picture important figures of the time. For example, the Virgin Mary, patron saints, powerful Norman figures, and influential royal figures. Two styles of these windows incorporate different meanings that are very influential. The stained windows that are more elegant and perfectly modeled embody the contemporary paintings that are showcased in Paris. While the more flat, decorative, and detailed windows embody the monuments of the 14th-century Norman glass paintings.

The bishop's palace, a building of the 15th century, adjoins the south side of the cathedral.

A thorough restoration was completed in 1896.

The stained glass windows were destroyed during World War II but were restored by Jean-Jacques Grüber in 1953. The spire, called "Clocher d’Argent", rises to a height of 78m after its reconstruction after being bombed during the Second World War. A wooden octagonal belfry and spire surmounting the south-west tower was not restored and is missing.

== The organ ==
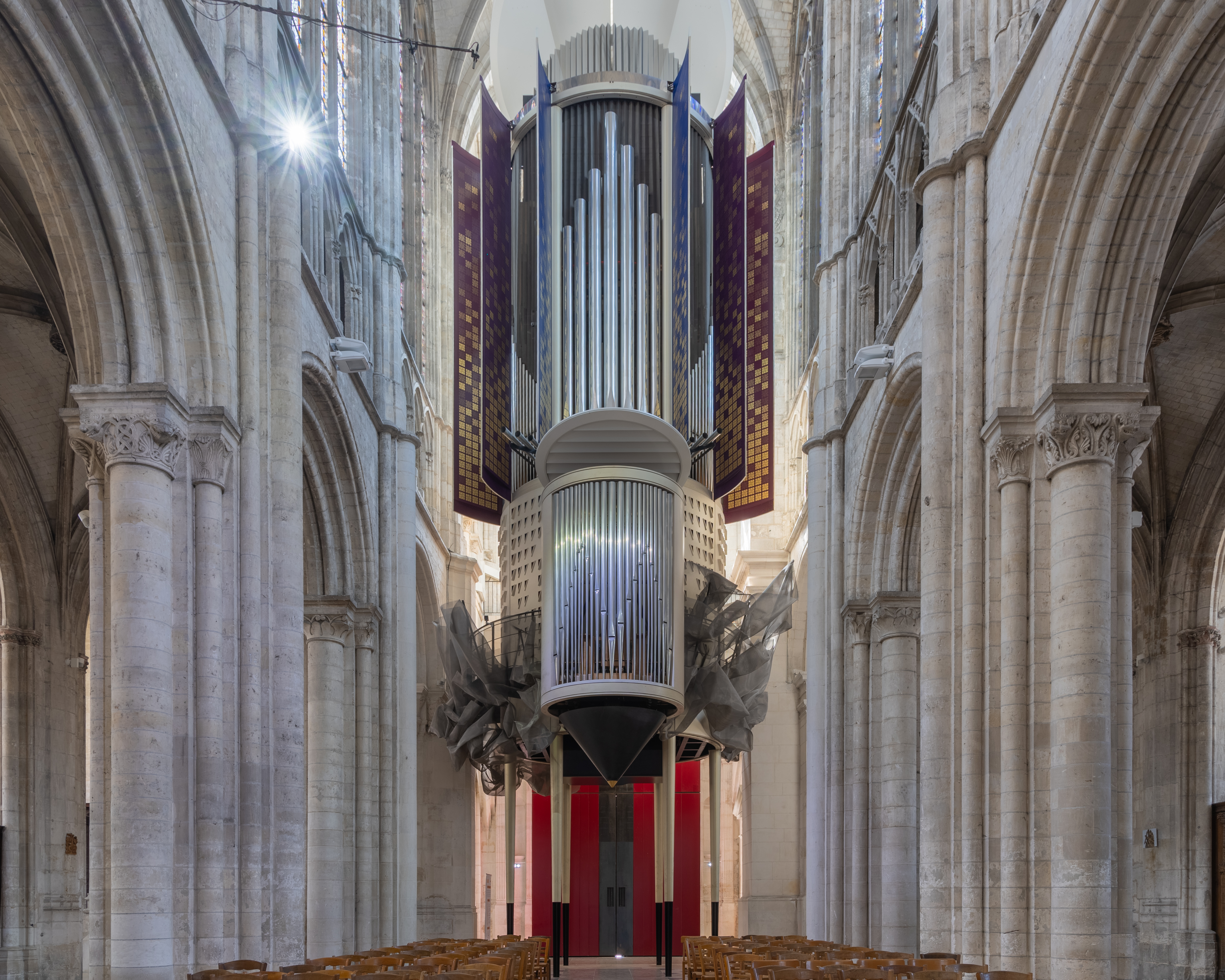
Pipe organ from 2006 at the western end of the nave

The new organ was built in 2006 by the Atelier Quoirin of Saint-Didier, organ builders, and contains around 4000 pipes. The inaugural concerts have been given by famous organists, such as Thierry Escaich, Pierre Pincemaille or André Isoir. It occupies the west end of the nave, rising from the triforium to the vault.

== Design ==
This building is a 7-bay aisled nave that faces the west with twin towers in a post-medieval style. The plan is in a cross-style layout with a northern transept arm in a Gothic style with vaulted spaces at each end, one to the west and one to the south. Next to the transept arm, is a trapezoidal shape followed by three bays that protrude out that include aisles and chapels. When it comes to the interior, there is only one entrance to the building. Looking inside, there are semicircular arches in the Norman style, except for the moldings. There are oak screens that section off the chapels located in the cathedral. The Virgin Chapel is the biggest one of the other chapels in the cathedral, with its dimensions equaling the size of other chapels in France at the time. The nave in the cathedral has three stories, which each has specific design elements. The main level has columns that separate the bays, and the level has a rib-vaulted ceiling. The second level is a triforium with interlaced arches. Some of the bays on this floor have cusped arches, which were designed by Gauthier de Varinfroy. Clerestory windows can be seen on this level with "Parisian" tracery and above, rib vaults. Later, the rib vaults were causing problems which Louis XI rebuilt under his supervision.

== Gallery ==
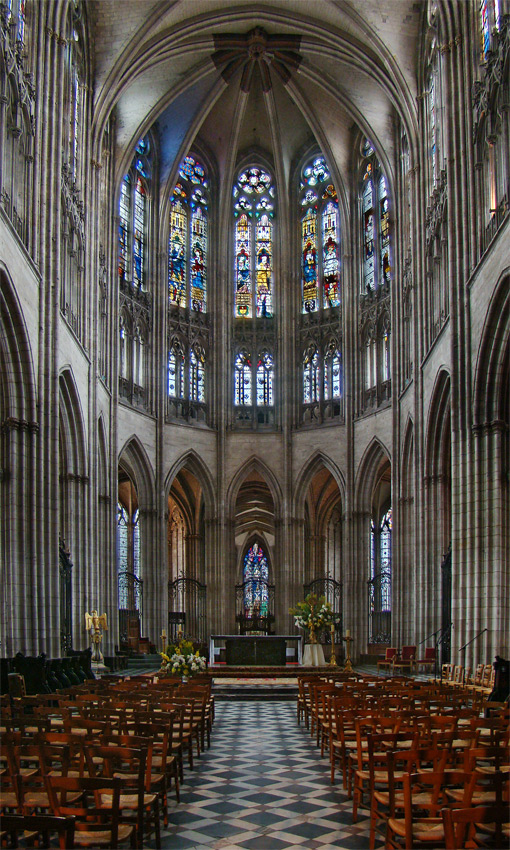
The Gothic choir

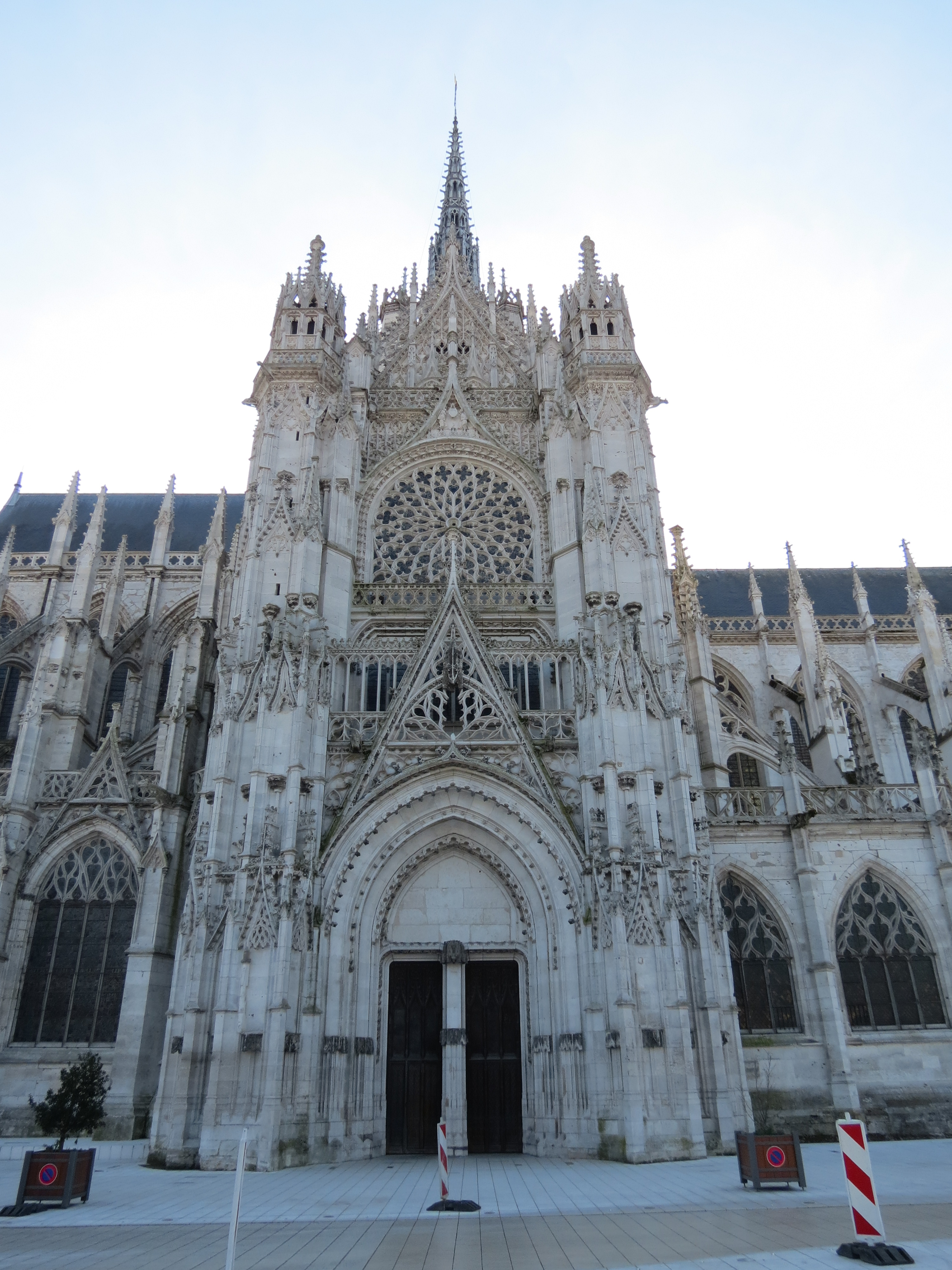
North transept façade

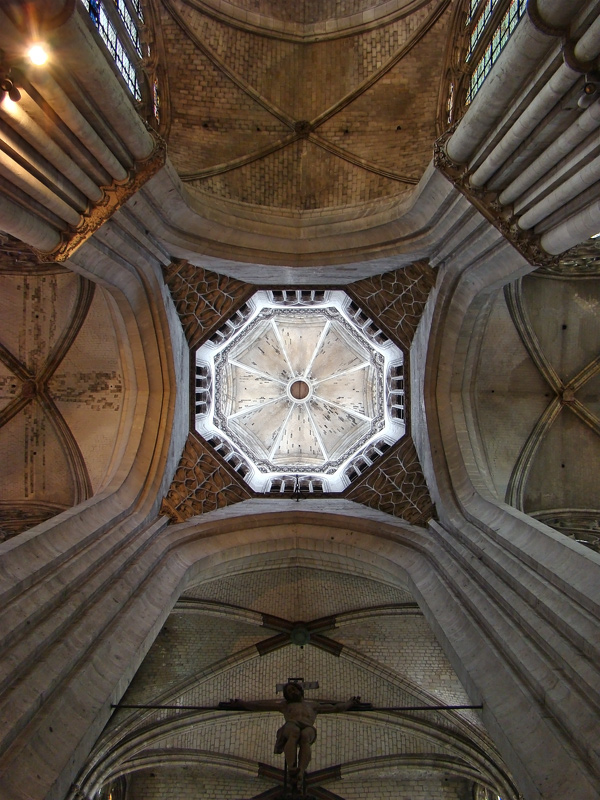
The octagonal central tower

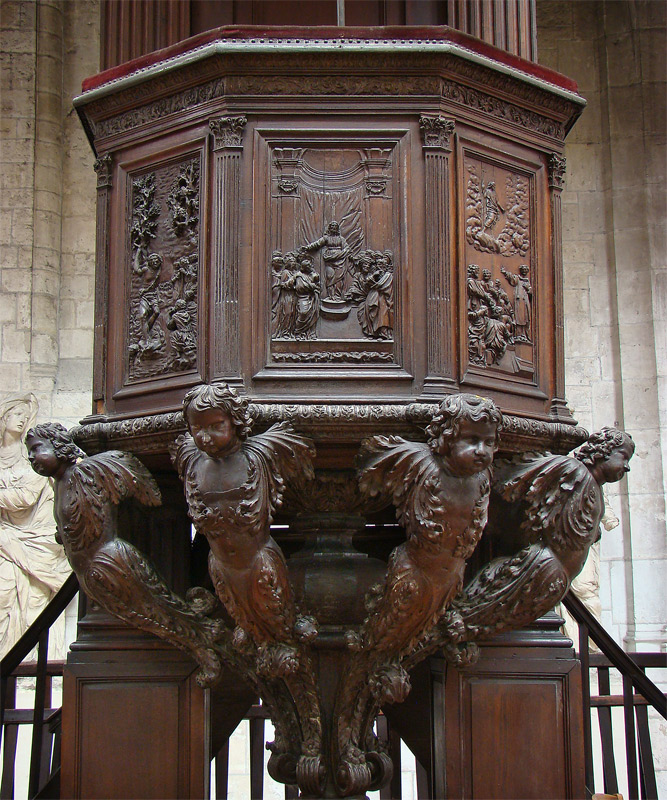
The walnut pulpit, sculpted by the monk Guillaume de la Tremblaye, 1675

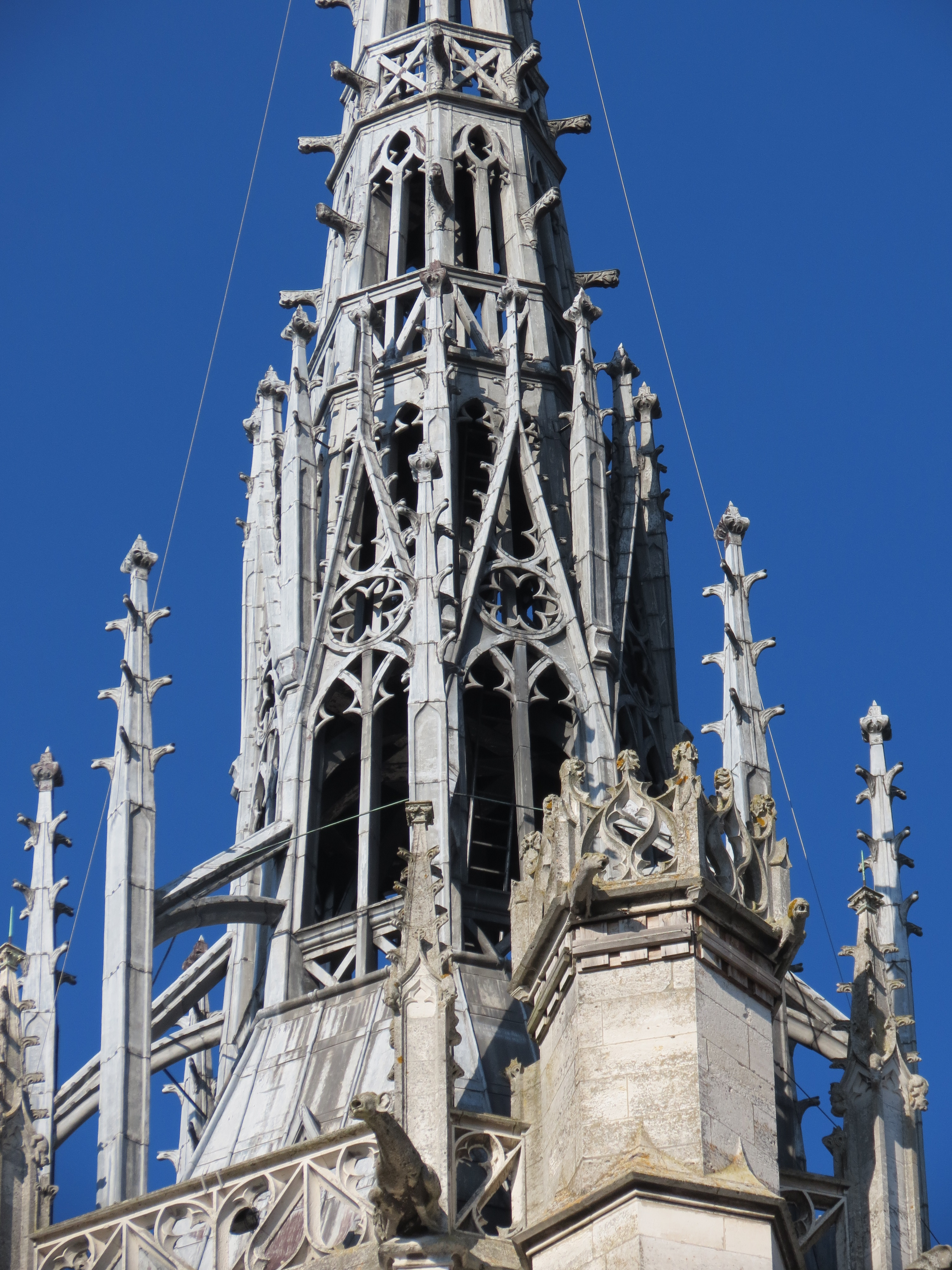
Detail of the central spire

== See also ==
- Late medieval domes

== Sources ==
- Catholic Hierarchy: Evreux
- Photos of Evreux Cathedral
