= Pézy =

- Part of Theuville
- Location of Pézy
- Location within France Location within Centre-Val de Loire
- Coordinates: 48°19′11″N 1°34′32″E
- Country: France
- Region: Centre-Val de Loire
- Department: Eure-et-Loir
- Arrondissement: Chartres
- Canton: Voves
- Commune: Theuville
- Area^{1}: 6.19 km^{2} (2.39 sq mi)
- Elevation: 164 m (538 ft)
- Highest elevation: 166 m (545 ft)
- Lowest elevation: 153 m (502 ft)
- Population (2013): 244
  - Density: 39.4/km^{2} (102/sq mi)
- Time zone: UTC+01:00 (CET)
  - Summer (DST): UTC+02:00 (CEST)
- Postal code: 28150
- ^{1} French Land Register data, which excludes lakes, ponds, glaciers > 1 km^{2} (0.386 sq mi or 247 acres) and river estuaries.

Pézy (French pronunciation: [pezi]) is a former commune in the Eure-et-Loir department in northern France. On 1 January 2016, it was merged into the commune of Theuville.

== See also ==
- Communes of the Eure-et-Loir department
