= Maximus of Évreux =

4th-century Christian bishop, martyr, and saint

Saint Maximus of Évreux
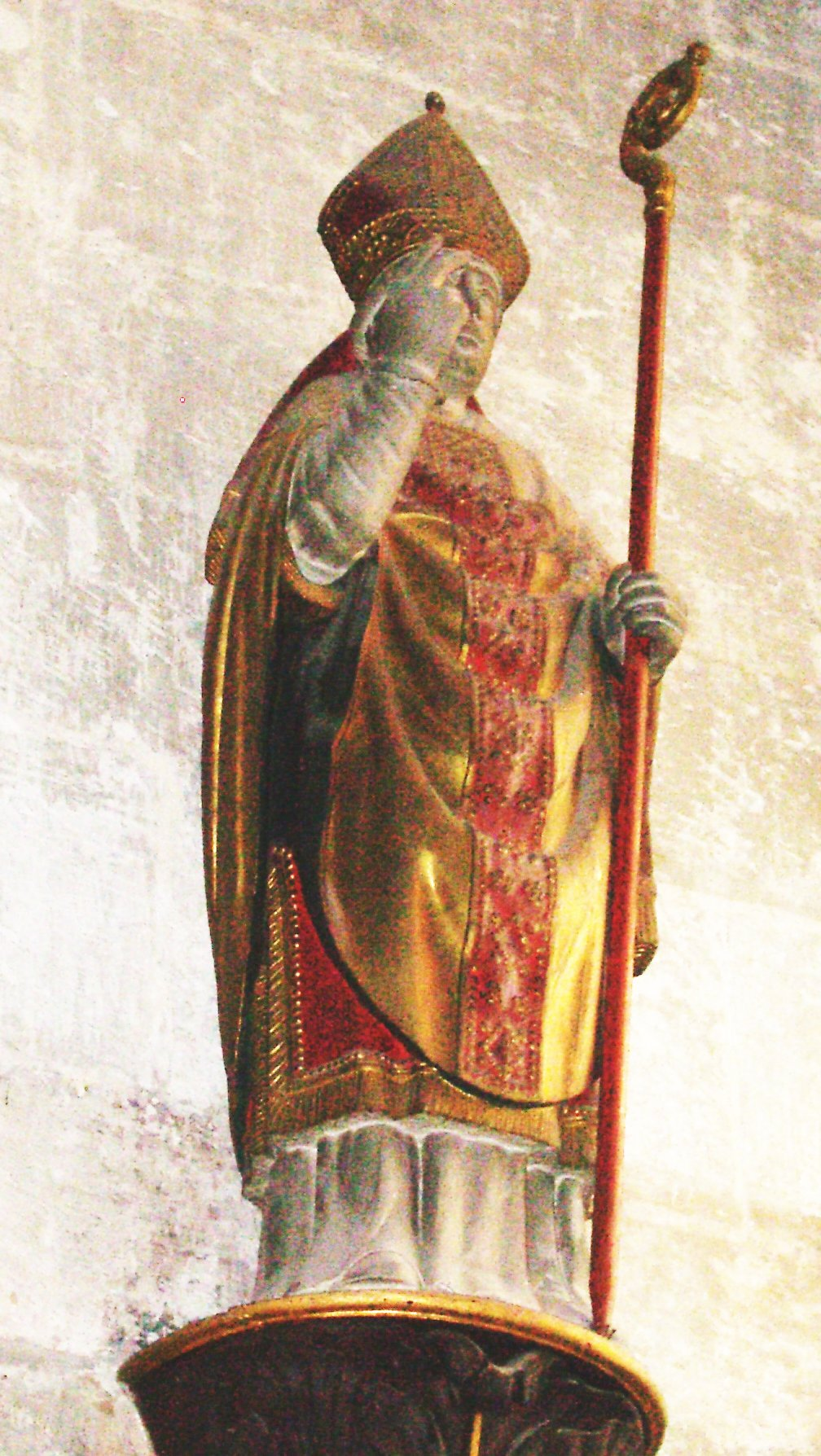
- Statue of Maximus (Mauxe). Collegiate church of Vernon.

Bishop, Martyr
- Died: 4th century? Acquigny, Normandy
- Venerated in: Roman Catholic Church; Eastern Orthodox Church
- Major shrine: Vernon, Eure
- Feast: 25 May
- Patronage: Vernon, Eure; invoked against drought

Saint Maximus of Évreux (died ca. 385), called Saint Mauxe locally, is venerated as a saint by the Catholic Church and the Eastern Orthodox Church. His legend states that he was the second bishop of Évreux, and that he died a martyr at Acquigny with his brother, who was his deacon. His brother is called Venerandus (Vénérand) or Victorinus.

== Legend ==
Their legend states that they were natives of Brescia. Maximus was a bishop and Victorinus was a deacon. They attempted to make converts to Christianity amongst the ranks of the barbarian armies, but failed. The brothers were sent by Pope Damasus I to preach in Gaul instead, to continue the work of Saint Taurinus (Taurin) in the region. Taurinus is considered the first bishop of Évreux.

They traveled to Gaul with two priests, Mark and Etherius, passing through Auxerre, Sens, and Paris until they reached Évreux, where Maximus became bishop (the years of his episcopate are sometimes given as 411–440, which conflict with the traditional date of his martyrdom).

At Acquigny they were captured by either pagans or Arians and were beheaded. Mark and Etherius escaped. They returned to bury the two brothers. Etherius later became bishop of Évreux.

== Veneration ==
Their relics were re-discovered around 960 by a man named Amalbert. He attempted to carry the relics off, leaving behind only the heads of Maximus and Victorinus. However, as he was crossing the Seine near Fontenelle Abbey, he fell sick. He left the relics at the monastery, where Richard I of Normandy built a chapel to house them. The relics were later burnt by the Huguenots.

The saints’ heads, however, remained at Acquigny. A Benedictine church was built over their tomb, but it fell into decay. The relics were translated to the parish church and deposited under the high altar. The saints were invoked against drought in 1559, 1615 and 1726, when they were carried after the head of Saint Swithun.

A sanctuary dedicated to him may have existed from the fifth century. In the forest of Bizy, at Vernon, one can see the supposed tomb of Maximus. It carries the inscription: "This monument of piety was restored by the Duchess of Orleans. 1816." On its southern face is a carved image of a saint carrying the crozier of a bishop. The monument is very degraded.

== Notes ==
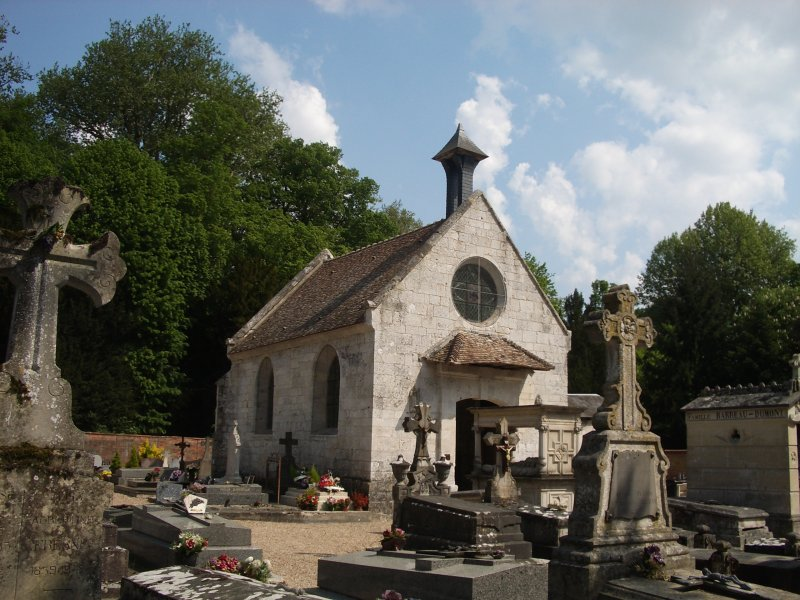
Chapel of Saint-Mauxe at Acquigny.

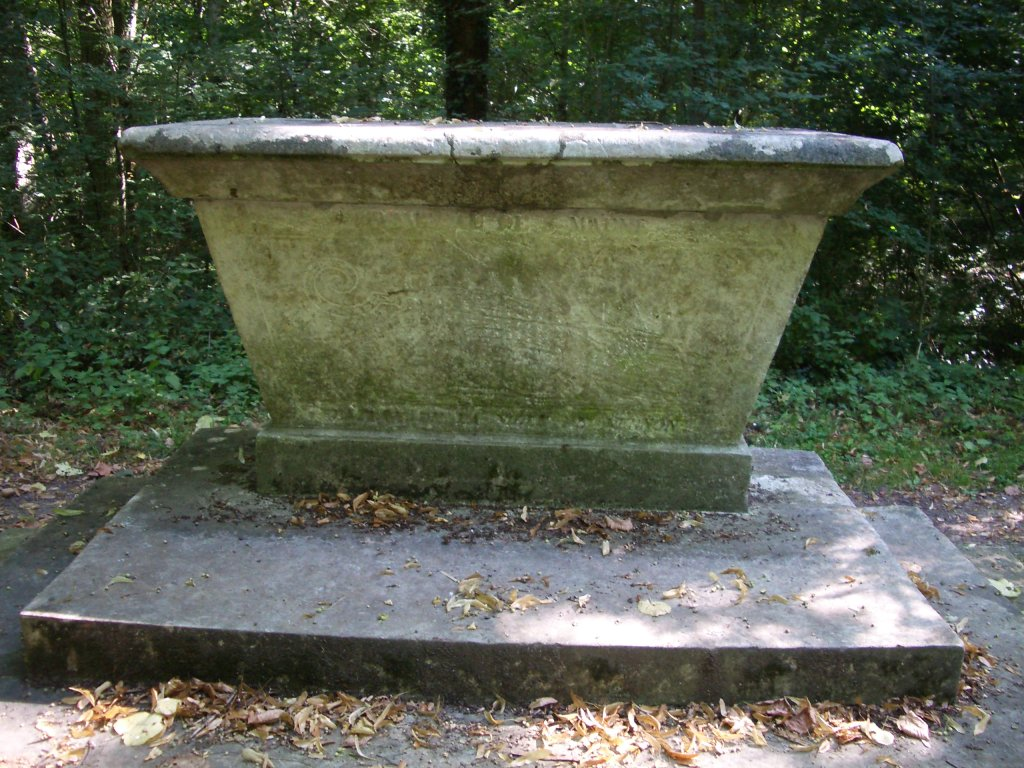
Tomb of Saint Maximus in the forest of Vernon.
