= Theuville, Eure-et-Loir =

Theuville
- Commune
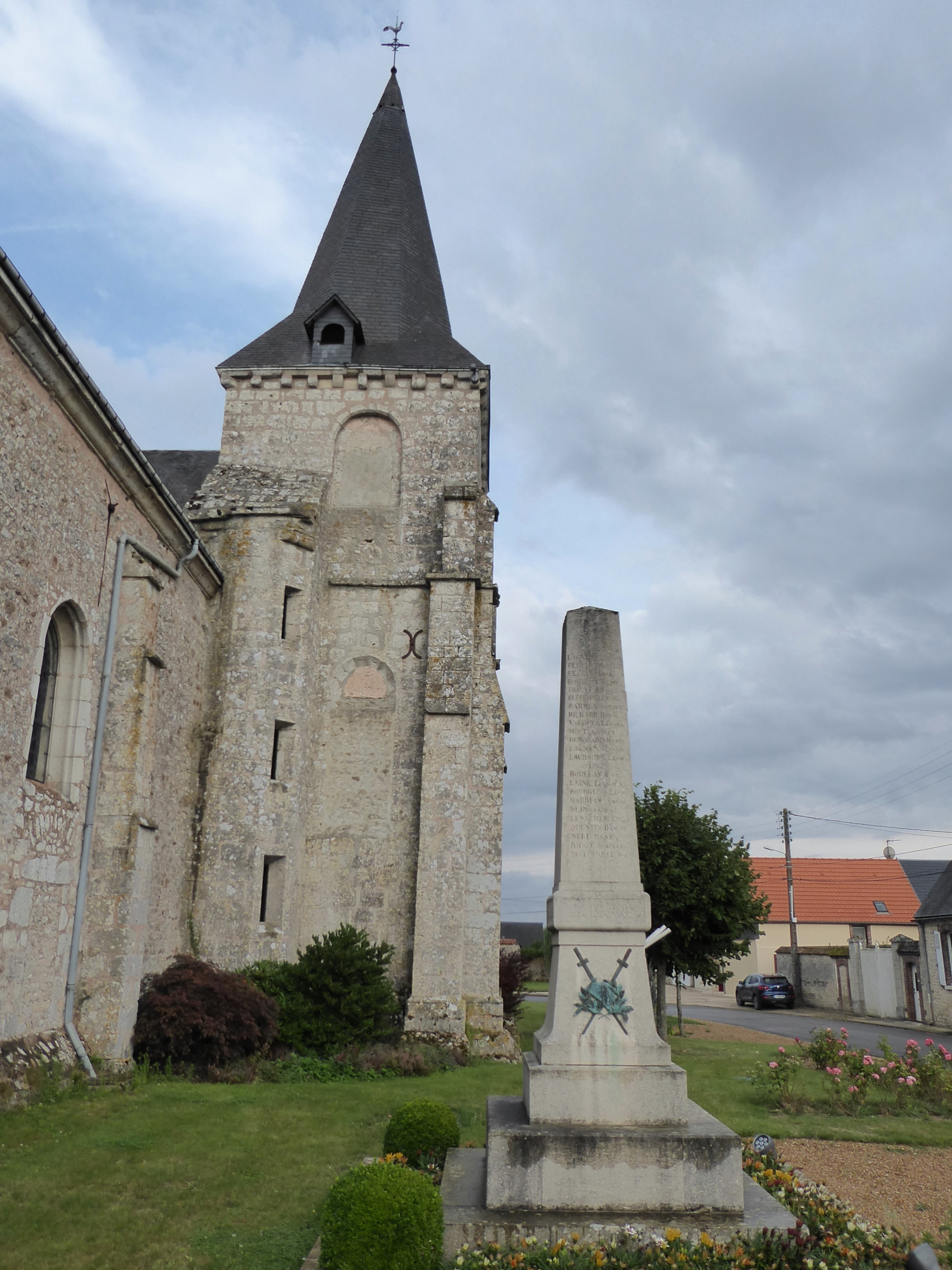
- The church in Theuville
- Location of Theuville
- Location within France Location within Centre-Val de Loire
- Coordinates: 48°20′10″N 1°36′03″E
- Country: France
- Region: Centre-Val de Loire
- Department: Eure-et-Loir
- Arrondissement: Chartres
- Canton: Les Villages Vovéens
- Intercommunality: CA Chartres Métropole

Government
  - Mayor (2020–2026): Emilie Guillemin
- Area^{1}: 29.86 km^{2} (11.53 sq mi)
- Elevation: 155 m (509 ft)
- Highest elevation: 166 m (545 ft)
- Lowest elevation: 141 m (463 ft)
- Population (2023): 729
  - Density: 24.4/km^{2} (63.2/sq mi)
- Time zone: UTC+01:00 (CET)
  - Summer (DST): UTC+02:00 (CEST)
- INSEE/Postal code: 28383 /28360
- ^{1} French Land Register data, which excludes lakes, ponds, glaciers > 1 km^{2} (0.386 sq mi or 247 acres) and river estuaries.

Theuville (French pronunciation: [tøvil]) is a commune in the Eure-et-Loir department in northern France. On 1 January 2016, the former commune of Pézy was merged into Theuville.

== Population ==
Historical population
Year	Pop.	±% p.a.
1968	517	—
1975	450	−1.96%
1982	473	+0.71%
1990	584	+2.67%
1999	608	+0.45%
2007	655	+0.94%
2012	675	+0.60%
2017	708	+0.96%
2023	729	+0.49%
Source: INSEE

== See also ==
- Communes of the Eure-et-Loir department
