= Pope Clement IV =

Head of the Catholic Church from 1265 to 1268

- Bishop of Rome
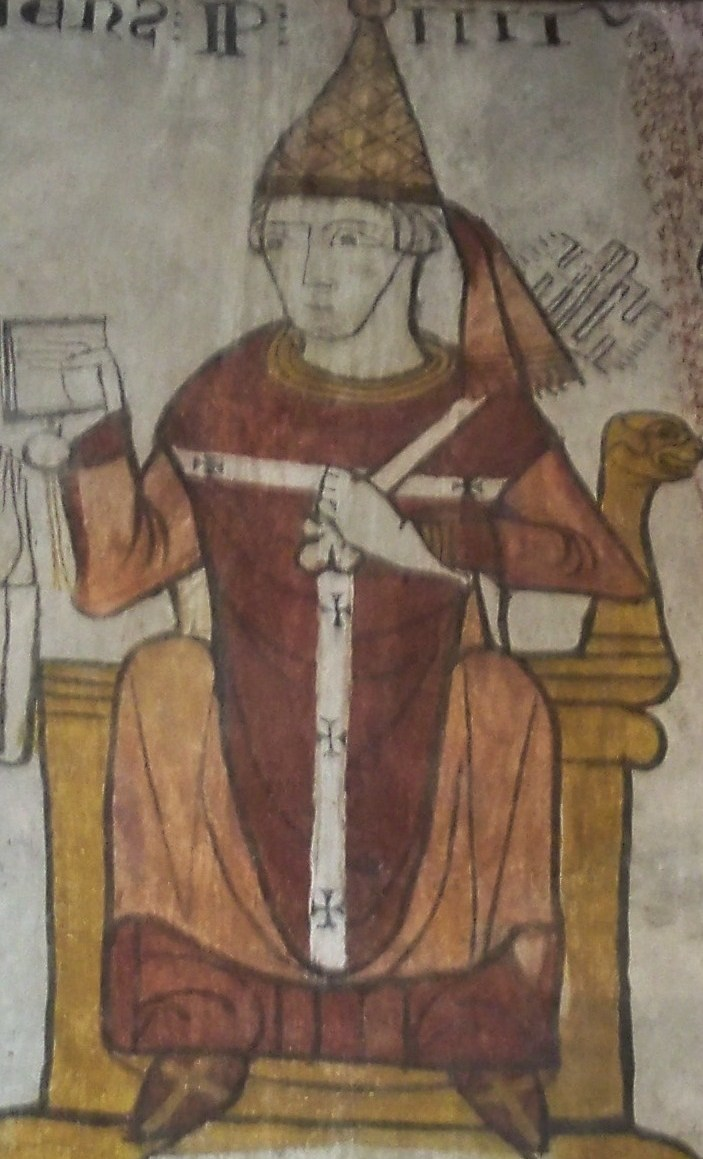
- Clement IV depicted in a 13th-century fresco
- Church: Catholic Church
- Papacy began: 5 February 1265
- Papacy ended: 29 November 1268
- Predecessor: Urban IV
- Successor: Gregory X
- Previous posts: Bishop of Le Puy-en-Velay (1257–1259); Archbishop of Narbonne (1259–1261); Cardinal-Bishop of Sabina (1261–1265); Major Penitentiary (1263–1265); Legate to England (1263–1265)

Orders
- Consecration: 1257
- Created cardinal: 17 December 1261 by Urban IV

Personal details
- Born: Gui Foucois c. 23 November 1190 Saint-Gilles-du-Gard, County of Toulouse, Kingdom of France
- Died: 29 November 1268 (aged 78) Viterbo, Papal States
- Coat of arms: Clement IV's coat of arms

Ordination history of Pope Clement IV
History
Episcopal consecration
- Consecrated by: Raymond Amaury
- Date: 1257
Episcopal succession
Bishops consecrated by Pope Clement IV as principal consecrator
- Paperone de’ Papareschi, O.P.: 27 June 1265
- Marino de Eboli: ?? ???? 1266
- Giacomo de Castiglione: March 1266
- Ugolino Acquaviva: ?? ???? 1266
- Pedro Morella: 12 October 1266
- Pierre de Charny: ?? ???? 1267
- Nicolas Lis: ?? ???? 1267
- Archbishop Nicola: ?? ???? 1267
- Archbishop Hugues: 20 June 1268
- Jean (Jon) Rufus (Raude): 24 June 1268
- Juan Villahoz: 3 September 1268

Pope Clement IV (Latin: Clemens IV; c. 23 November 1190 – 29 November 1268), born Gui Foucois (Latin: Guido Falcodius; French: Guy de Foulques or Guy Foulques) and also known as Guy le Gros (French for "Guy the Fat"; Italian: Guido il Grosso), was Bishop of Le Puy (1257–1260), Archbishop of Narbonne (1259–1261), Cardinal of Sabina (1261–1265), and head of the Catholic Church from 5 February 1265 until his death. His election as pope occurred at a conclave held at Perugia that lasted four months while cardinals argued over whether to call in Charles I of Anjou, the youngest brother of Louis IX of France, to carry on the papal war against the Hohenstaufens. Pope Clement was a patron of Thomas Aquinas and of Roger Bacon, encouraging Bacon in the writing of his Opus Majus, which included important treatises on optics and the scientific method.

== Life before election ==
Clement was born in Saint-Gilles-du-Gard in the County of Toulouse, to a lawyer, Pierre Foucois, and his wife Marguerite Ruffi. At the age of nineteen, he enrolled as a soldier to fight the Moors in Spain. He then pursued the study of law in Toulouse, Bourges and Orleans, becoming a noted advocate in Paris. In the latter capacity he acted as secretary to King Louis IX, to whose influence he was chiefly indebted for his elevation to the cardinalate. He married the daughter of Simon de Malbois and had two daughters. Upon the death of his wife, he followed his father's example and gave up secular life for the Church.

His rise was rapid. Ordained in the abbey of Saint-Magloire, Paris, he became pastor of Saint-Gilles in 1255. In 1257, he was appointed Bishop of Le Puy; in 1259, he was appointed Archbishop of Narbonne; and in December 1261, he became the first cardinal created by Pope Urban IV, for the See of Sabina. He was the papal legate in England between 1262 and 1264. He was named a cardinal (grand penitentiary) in 1263.

== Pontificate ==
In this period, the See of Rome was engaged in a conflict with Manfred, King of Sicily, the illegitimate son and designated heir of Holy Roman Emperor Frederick II of Hohenstaufen, but whom papal loyalists, the Guelphs, called "the usurper of Naples". Clement IV, who was in France at the time of his election, was compelled to enter Italy in disguise. He immediately took steps to ally himself with Charles of Anjou, his erstwhile patron's brother and the impecunious French claimant to the Neapolitan throne. Charles was willing to recognize the Pope as his feudal overlord (a bone of contention with the Hohenstaufens) and was crowned by cardinals in Rome, where Clement IV, permanently established at Viterbo, dared not venture, since the anti-papal Ghibelline party was so firmly in control there.

Then, fortified with papal money and supplies, Charles marched into Naples. Having defeated and slain Manfred in the great Battle of Benevento, Charles established himself firmly in the kingdom of Sicily at the conclusive Battle of Tagliacozzo, in which Conradin, the last of the house of Hohenstaufen, was taken prisoner. Clement IV is said to have disapproved of the cruelties committed by his protégé, but the statement by Gregorovius that Clement IV became an accomplice by refusing to intercede for the unfortunate Conradin whom Charles had beheaded in the marketplace of Naples seems contentious. However, Gregorovius may be basing this conclusion on the position of Urban IV's predecessors, Innocent IV and Alexander IV, who were Conradin's official guardians.

=== Acts ===
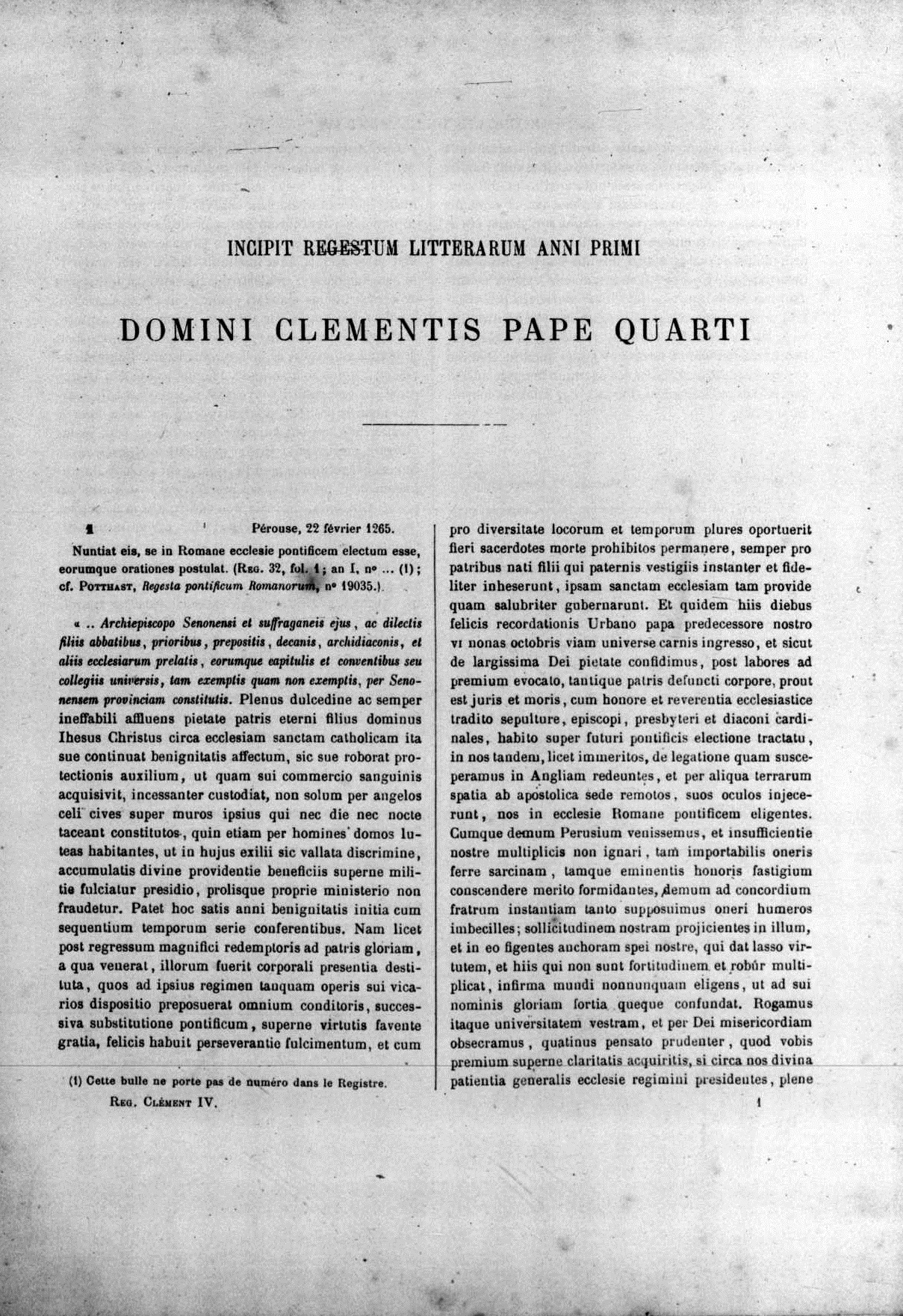
Collection of writings by Clemens, published in Paris between 1893 and 1945

In 1264, Clement IV renewed the prohibition of the Talmud promulgated by Gregory IX, who had it publicly burnt in France and in Italy. Though Clement did not condemn to death at the stake those who harboured copies of it, and, responding to a denunciation of the Talmud by Pablo Christiani, he ordered that the Jews of the Crown of Aragon submit their books to Dominican censors for expurgation.

In February 1265 Clement summoned Thomas Aquinas to Rome to serve as papal theologian. It was during this period that Aquinas also served as regent master for the Dominicans at Rome. With the arrival of Aquinas the existing studium conventuale at Santa Sabina, which had been founded in 1222, was transformed into the Order's first studium provinciale featuring the study of philosophy (studia philosophiae) as prescribed by Aquinas and others at the chapter of Valenciennes in 1259, an intermediate school between the studium conventuale and the studium generale. This studium was the forerunner of the 16th century College of Saint Thomas at Santa Maria sopra Minerva and the Pontifical University of Saint Thomas Aquinas, Angelicum. In 1266, after the Battle of Benevento, Pope Clement IV conceded for gratitude his coat of arms to the Guelph Party of Florence as official approval to their supremacy and therefore they could take power in many of the other northern Italian cities. In 1267–68 Clement engaged in correspondence with the Mongol Ilkhanate ruler Abaqa. The latter proposed a Franco-Mongol alliance between his forces, those of the West, and the Byzantine emperor Michael VIII Palaeologos (Abaqa's father-in-law). Pope Clement welcomed Abaqa's proposal in a non-committal manner, but did inform him of an upcoming Crusade. In 1267, Pope Clement IV and King James I of Aragon sent an ambassador to the Mongol ruler Abaqa in the person of Jayme Alaric de Perpignan. In his 1267 letter written from Viterbo, the Pope wrote:

The kings of France and Navarre, taking to heart the situation in the Holy Land, and decorated with the Holy Cross, are readying themselves to attack the enemies of the Cross. You wrote to us that you wished to join your father-in-law (the Greek emperor Michael VIII Palaiologos) to assist the Latins. We abundantly praise you for this, but we cannot tell you yet, before having asked to the rulers, what road they are planning to follow. We will transmit to them your advice, so as to enlighten their deliberations, and will inform your Magnificence, through a secure message, of what will have been decided.

Although Clement's successors continued to engage in diplomatic contacts with the Mongols for the rest of the century, they were never able to coordinate an actual alliance.

== Death and burial ==
On 29 November 1268 Clement IV died and was buried at the Dominican convent, Santa Maria in Gradi, just outside Viterbo, where he resided throughout his pontificate. In 1885, his remains were transferred to the church, San Francesco alla Rocca, in Viterbo. Owing to irreconcilable divisions among the cardinals, the papal throne remained vacant for nearly three years.

Clement IV's private character was praised by contemporaries for his asceticism, and he is especially commended for his indisposition to promote and enrich his own relatives. He also ordered the Franciscan scholar Roger Bacon to write the Opus Majus, which is addressed to him.

== See also ==
- List of popes

Catholic Church titles
Preceded by Urban IV	Pope; 1265–68	Succeeded by Gregory X
