= Jean Balue =

French cardinal

His Eminence Jean Balue
- Cardinal-Priest
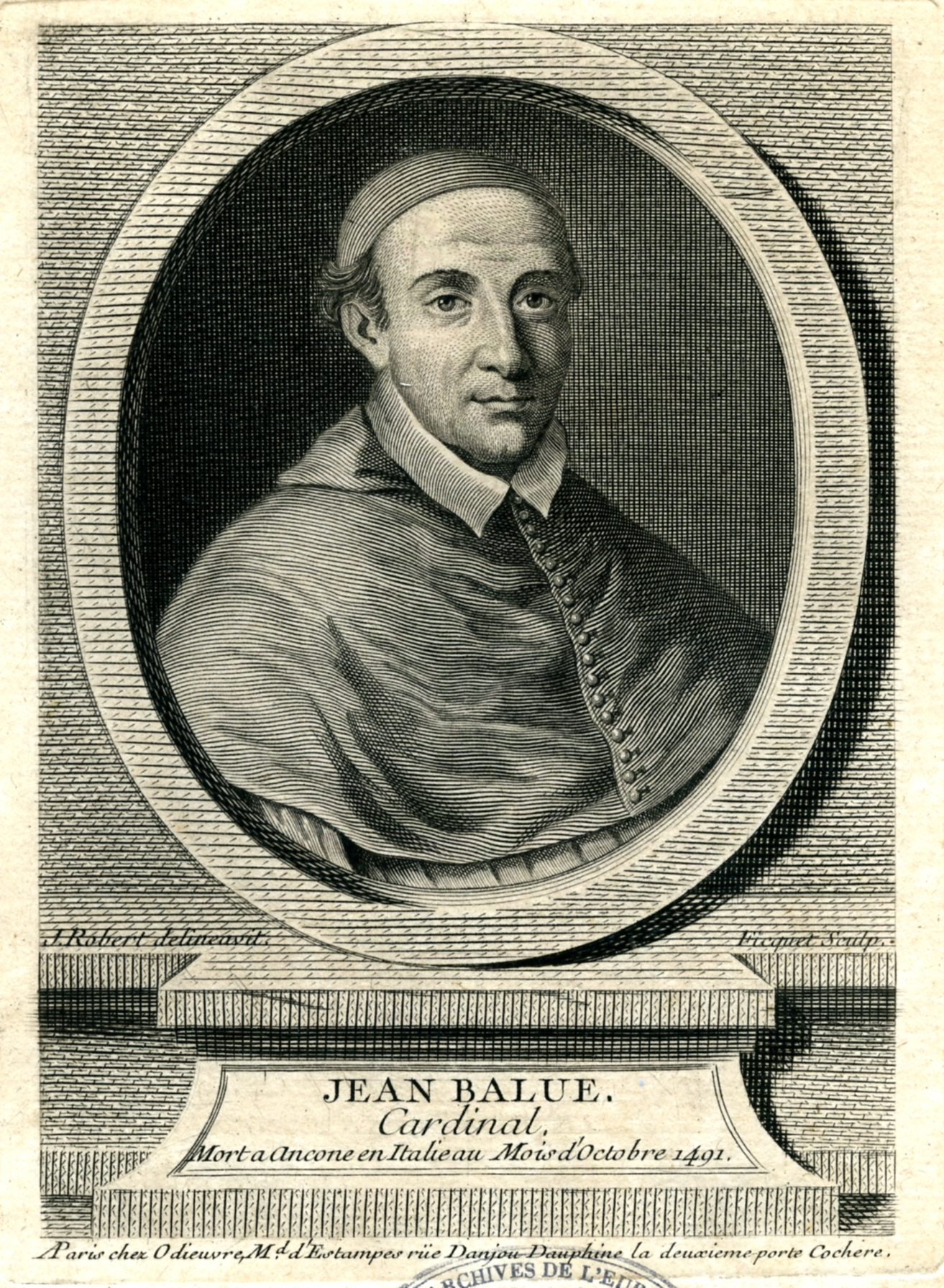
- Church: Santa Susanna
- Diocese: Evreux (1465-1467); Angers (1467-1483); Albano (1483-1491); Autun (1484-1491); Palestrina (1491)

Orders
- Consecration: 4 August 1465 by Guillaume Chartier; Bishop of Paris
- Created cardinal: 18 September 1467 by Pope Paul II
- Rank: Cardinal Priest, then Cardinal Bishop

Personal details
- Born: c. 1421 Basse d'Angles-sur-Langlin FR
- Died: 5 October 1491 (aged 69–70) Ripatransone, (Ascoli Piceno) IT
- Residence: France, Rome
- Occupation: courtier, politician, diplomat
- Profession: bishop
- Education: University of Angers, Licenciate in Law

Jean Balue (c. 1421 – 5 October 1491) was a French cardinal and minister of Louis XI. Born without resources, he managed to climb the political ladder by exploiting connections, to whom he often did not remain loyal, and by making himself an indispensable agent of the king's purposes in a time of political disorder in France. His services were as much military as ecclesiastical, bringing him the critical task of defending the city of Paris against the King's enemies. His work as a diplomat in dealing with Duke Francis of Brittany and with Charles de France brought him the office of first minister to the King. Balue overreached himself in negotiating a treaty between the King and Charles the Bold, who had become Duke of Burgundy and was trying to recover all his family inheritance. Secret correspondence revealed that he might have been playing both sides in the negotiation, and he was arrested, and held on charges of treason from 1469 to 1481, while King and Pope argued over jurisdiction. After the death of King Louis and Pope Sixtus IV, the new French king, Charles VIII, appointed Balue his ambassador in Rome.

== Biography ==
He was born of very humble parentage at Angles-sur-l'Anglin in Poitou. The date of his birth is conjectured to be around 1421, based on his epitaph in Santa Prassede in Rome, in which he is said to have died as Legate of the Marches while in his seventies, Legatum agens septuagenarius gloriose obiit. The word 'septuagenarian' is somewhat elastic. Jean Balue had a brother Antoine and a brother Nicolas.

He was first patronized by the bishop of Poitiers, Jacques Juvénel des Ursins (1449–1457). By December 1457 Balue had obtained a Licenciate in law, perhaps from the University of Angers.

In 1461 Balue is still referred to as 'clericus', but by 1465 he is called a priest. These are the parameters for his date of ordination to the priesthood. Likewise in 1461 he was given the Deanship of Candé by his new patron, Bishop Jean de Beauvau of Angers.

=== Canon Balue ===
In 1461 he became vicar-general (Grand Vicar) of the bishop of Angers, Jean de Beauvau (1447–1467), and was named a Canon of the Cathedral of Saint-Mauritius. In 1462 he accompanied Bishop de Beauvau to Rome in the embassy which was sent to present the homage of the new King of France, Louis XI, to Pope Pius II, and to engage in negotiations concerning the revocation of the Pragmatic Sanction, as well as the French claims to the Kingdom of Naples. The leader of the embassy was Bishop Jean Jouffroy of Arras, who had been named a cardinal on 18 December 1461. During this visit Balue was named a Protonotary Apostolic by the Pope. On their return to Angers, Bishop de Beauvau wanted to reward Balue with the grant of the prebend of S. Marguerite in the Cathedral Chapter, which had just fallen vacant on the death of the Dean of the Chapter. The prebend, however, was in the gift of the Chapter, not the bishop, and they protested successfully to the Pope, who granted the prebend to the Chapter's candidate on 21 January 1463. Not satisfied with the result, Balue carried an appeal to the King. In Paris he got in touch with Thibault de Vitry, a Canon of Paris who held the office of Treasurer of the Cathedral Chapter of Angers as a benefice. He was introduced to the Lieutenant-General of Paris and the Île-de-France, Charles de Melun, whose father was Governor of Champagne and Brie and Governor of the Bastille. Melun in due course presented Balue to the King. Louis XI granted letters patent on 15 September 1463 ordering the Chapter to hand over the prebend to Balue.

On 10 February 1464, at the request of King Louis, the Pope granted Balue a new Canonry in the Cathedral Chapter of Angers which had fallen vacant.

His activity, cunning, and mastery of manipulation gained him the appreciation of Louis XI, who made him his almoner in 1464 and one of his secretaries. Balue's ambitions then got him into trouble. He looked to succeed Vitry, who had just died, as Treasurer of Angers, and on 23 March 1464 made his claim. But Bishop de Beauvau held a bull of Pius II which granted him the gift of an abbey or any other benefice which happened to become vacant. Beauvau wanted the Treasurership for his own purposes. The Canons of the Cathedral opposed Balue out of respect for the bishop, but, on 20 April a cleric of Paris, Jacques Chaumort appeared in Angers with a mandate from the King, ordering the Canons to allow Balue to enjoy the fruits of the office of Treasurer. The Canons complied. This was the end of the friendship and patronage of Bishop de Beauvau.

Balue also acquired a number of other benefices during the year 1464. He was made Abbot Commendatory of Fécamp, Abbot Commendatory of Saint-Thierry de Reims, and (in 1465) Abbot Commendatory of Saint-Jean-d'Angély. He was also named Prior of Saint-Eloi-de-Paris, and (in 1465) Saint-Jean-des-Sables.

On 26 December, King Louis named Balue a Councilor clerk in Parliament, and on 28 December he granted Balue the privilege of conferring a wide range of benefices which were in the gift of the King. These included bursaries at the Collège de Navarre, benefices at the Hôtels-Dieu, hospitals for the sick and almonries.

=== Bishop Balue ===
Bishop Guillaume de Flocques of Évreux died on 27 November 1464, and on 18 December the King assigned the temporalities of the Diocese of Évreux to Jean Balue. Then, on 4 February 1465, King Louis XI nominated Balue to the bishopric of Évreux; he was elected by the Cathedral Chapter on 5 February; and he was preconised (approved) by Pope Pius II on 20 May 1465. His consecration took place in Paris at Notre-Dame on 4 August, with Bishop Guillaume Chartier of Paris acting as principal consecrator. Balue took possession of his diocese in person on 22 August 1465. On 27 August the King granted Balue a subsidy from the gabelle to allow him to resume work on the restoration of the Cathedral, which had begun under the patronage of Charles VII but which had ceased from lack of funds.

Bishop Jean de Beauvau of Angers was excommunicated by his Metropolitan, the Archbishop of Tours, on 13 November 1465, for various acts of insubordination. Beauvau refused to accept the sentence, and appealed to the Pope, claiming to be exempt from the jurisdiction of the Archbishop. But after some exchanges, Beauvau was summoned to appear before the courts in Rome. He refused to go, demonstrating yet again his commitment to Gallican liberties and the Pragmatic Sanction. Finally, under pressure from King Louis XI, Pope Paul II issued a decree of deposition on 5 June 1467, and on the same day he issued a bull transferring Bishop Jean Balue from the diocese of Évreux to the diocese of Angers. Bishop de Beauvau attempted to appeal to the Parliament of Paris against the Pope, but the King ordered the Parliament not to take cognizance of the case. Balue had replaced his former patron.

In the War of the Public Weal (Bien Publique), Bishop Balue and Charles Melun were assigned to the task of defending the city of Paris for the King. Melun was named Lieutenant-General, and Balue was ordered to see to the defenses. Neither was to leave Paris for the duration. On 13 July 1465, King Louis notified Marechal Rouault at Paris that it was his intention to fight on the next day, and he ordered Rouault's presence. Rouault asked Balue and Melun what he should do. Balue advised him to go to the King with his entire army, Melun opposed him. The Battle of Montlhéry was not decisive, but Louis conceived the idea that Melun had been prepared to betray him if the battle had been lost. He stripped Melun of everything that he had. On 5 October 1465 Louis was constrained to sign the Treaty of Conflans with Charles, Count of Charolais. On 23 December 1465 King Louis signed the Treaty of Caen with Duke Francis II of Brittany, and Balue, one of the cosigners, was ordered to keep watch on the Dukes of Burgundy and Brittany and provide the King with counsel as necessary.

In February 1466, Bishop Balue and Admiral de Montauban were sent to Nantes, where Duke Francis of Brittany had taken up residence. They were to continue discussions on Francis' proposals made at Caen, and also to take the measure of the envoys of Charles de France, Guillaume de Harancourt, the Bishop of Verdun, Charles' Chancellor; and Pierre Doriole, his Intendant of Finances. A most important goal was to get Charles himself away from Duke Francis and back to the company of the King. The rumor went round about that the Admiral explained privately to Charles what might happen to him if he returned to the King—as though Charles could not work that out himself. Whether true or not, Charles flatly refused the King's request and Balue had to give a completely negative report of the mission. Things might have become worse if the Admiral had not died on 1 May. At the end of the year Bishop Balue was sent back to Nantes, this time along with Guillaume de Paris, as Ambassadors of the King of France, to protest Louis' desire for good relations with Francis of Brittany, but to inquire about rumored dealings with the English. Francis disavowed any sinister implications, but it was discovered that the Duke and Duchess of Savoy were in Brittany, negotiating a league against King Louis. Balue returned and joined the King at Blois in February 1467.

=== Cardinal Balue ===
Stemma of Cardinal Jean Balue

King Louis IX made Bishop Jean Balue le premier du grant conseil. Thomas Basin remarks that the King held Balue to be velut fidissimum omnium mortalium hominum amicum ('practically the most trusted friend in the world'). In spite of his bad reputation for greed and disloyalty, the King requested and obtained for him a cardinalate. This was in gratitude for his finally negotiating the revocation of the Pragmatic Sanction, which was registered by the Parlement of Paris on 1 October 1467. Balue was named a cardinal by Pope Paul II in his first Consistory for the creation of cardinals on 18 September 1467, and was assigned the titular church of Santa Susanna, but not until the Consistory of 13 May 1468. He received his red hat in a ceremony in Notre-Dame in Paris on 17 November 1468.

In May 1467, Balue and Jean d'Estouteville were sent to Paris to engage in a mass enrollment of men to defend the city of Paris against the King's enemies. On 15 June, Charles the Bold became Duke of Burgundy. He was determined to recover territories which his father had sold to Louis XI to raise money for a crusade. These included Picardy, and Amiens. The prince-bishopric of Liège tried three times to revolt against the Duke (1465, 1467, 1468), each time with support promised by Louis XI, which repeatedly failed to materialize. On 20 September 1468, a conference was begun at Ham, between the delegates of King Louis (the Constable de Saint-Pol, Pierre Doriole, and Cardinal Balue) and those of Charles the Bold, who was encamped at Peronne, to arrange a peace between the two contenders and detach Duke Charles from Duke Francis of Brittany. The Cardinal, it seems, was attempting to keep the King from being seduced by the promises of the Duke.

In April 1469 Cardinal Balue accompanied the King and participated in the Estates General at Tours.

On 14 October 1469 King Louis, advised by his friend Cardinal Balue, consented to the terms of the Peace which Balue had negotiated with Charles the Bold.

==== Imprisoned ====
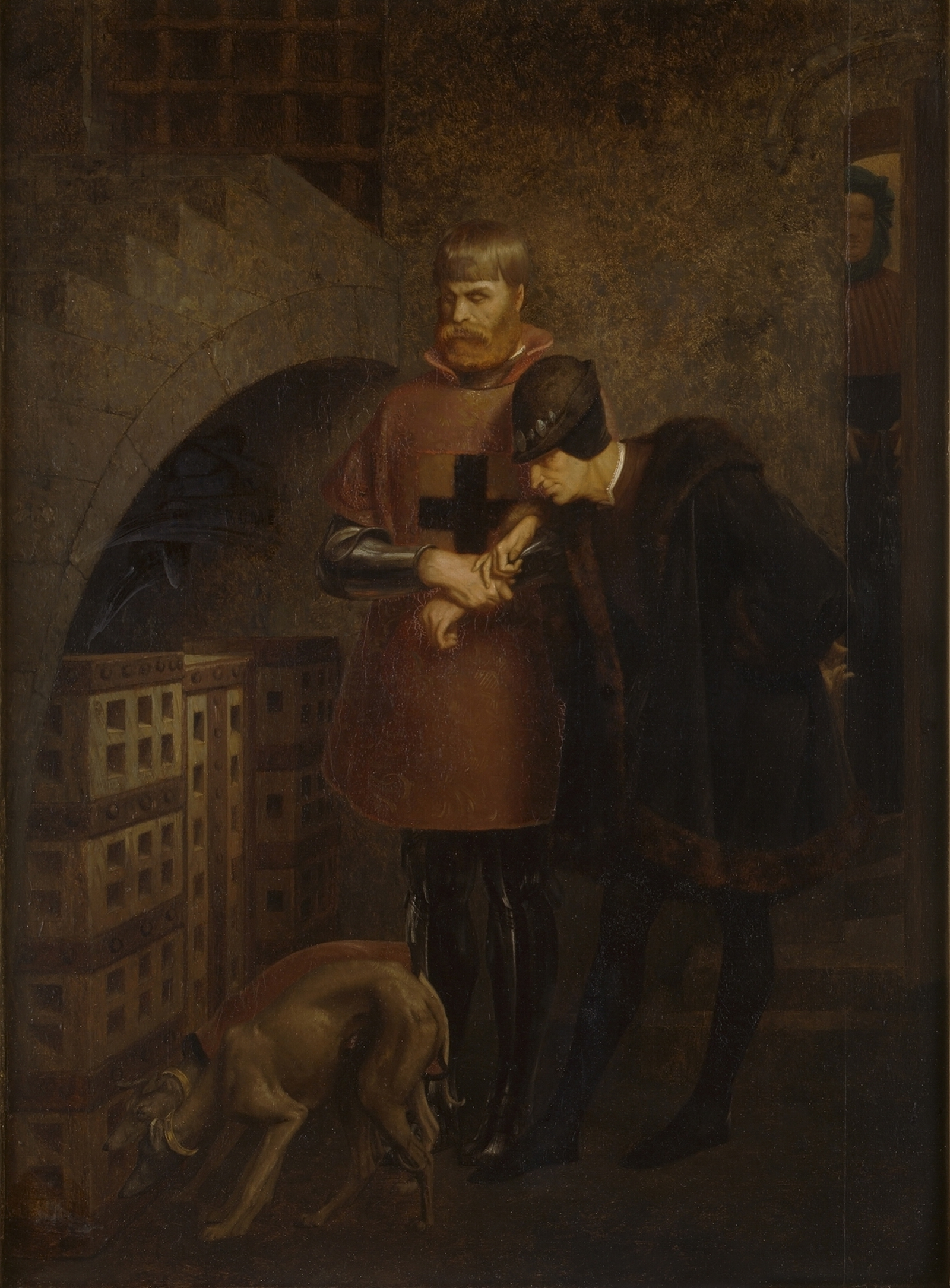
Louis XI of France visiting Cardinal Balue in his iron cage, painting by Jean-Léon Gérôme, 1883

But Balue shortly became compromised in the king’s humiliation by Charles the Bold at Péronne, as more and more important persons expressed disapproval of the treaty. Even people in the streets began to mock the King and his treaty. Louis decided to place all of the blame on Balue, who found himself excluded from the Council. He then intrigued with Charles against the King, revealing details of the King's secret plans. Their secret correspondence was intercepted by accident when, in April 1469, a suspicious priest was fortuitously arrested. On 23 April 1469 Balue was arrested at Amboise, and then transferred to Montbazon. The King was intent on putting Balue on trial for treason before royal judges, and Louis appointed a commission of eight men to find out the truth and mete out the punishment; but that raised the old issue of the exemption of clerics from civil jurisdiction; a cleric could only be tried in an ecclesiastical forum in accordance with Canon Law, and that was the position of Pope Sixtus IV. There was an impasse, which neither party wanted to take the responsibility for solving. King Louis sent an agent to Rome, Pierre Gruel, a President of the Parlement of Grenoble to explain the situation to the Pope. He was joined in November by Guillaume Cousinot, Sieur de Montreuil, and a lawyer Guillaume Lefranc. The ambassadors were received by the Pope on 1 December 1469, and a long series of discussions and debates ensued, which finally ended in an agreement to disagree as to who had the right and obligation to proceed against Balue. At the end of January 1470 Cardinal Balue was removed to Onzain on orders of Louis XI, but by 2 July 1472 he was being kept at Chinon. In May 1472 Cardinal Bessarion was sent as Legate to France, and he held discussions with Louis XI about the release of Balue, but without success. He remained a prisoner for eleven years, but not, as has been alleged, in an iron cage. His accomplice, the Bishop of Verdun, Guillaume d'Harancourt, was kept in the Bastile. The charge was lèse-majesté.

In Angers the Vicars of Cardinal Balue remained loyal and resisted the pressures from the Cathedral Chapter and the King until 1472, when they renounced the exercise of their functions under threat of royal fines. In March 1476 Pope Sixtus IV took the extraordinary step of relieving Bishop Jean de Beauvau of the various ecclesiastical censures which he had incurred, and returning his former benefices; his various acts were ratified. He was then named Apostolic Administrator of the diocese of Angers, superseding the Cardinal and his officers. Beauvau exercised this office until his death on 23 April 1479. The Chapter immediately elected as his successor a royal favorite, Auger de Brie (1479–1480). With Auger's appointment, a schism developed in the Chapter of the Cathedral of Angers, some Canons supporting the King's man, others supporting Cardinal Balue. The King wrote to the Pope about the situation, but the most that the Pope was prepared to do was to appoint a Coadjutor for Cardinal Balue.

In June 1480, the pope's cardinal nephew Giuliano della Rovere was sent to France as Legate to make peace between Louis XI and Maximilian of Austria, as well as to negotiate the release of Balue and Harancourt. He reached Paris in September, and finally, on 20 December 1480, King Louis gave orders that Balue be handed over to the Archpriest of Loudun, who had been commissioned by the Legate to receive him in the name of the Pope.

==== Released ====
In February 1481 his departure from France was delayed by illness, for which he had already been under medical treatment at Chinon, but he arrived in Lucca at the beginning of Spring. There he waited for a commission of Cardinals to decide his fate; the commission, headed by Cardinal Olivier Carafa, did not begin its meetings until 30 January 1482. On 26 February 1482, Pope Sixtus reestablished Balue in all his rights and all his dignities. Notwithstanding the work of the commission, Cardinal Balue received permission to enter Rome along with Cardinal della Rovere, who was returning from his mission as Legate to France. On 31 January 1483, Pope Sixtus named Cardinal Balue suburbicarian Bishop of Albano, making clear to all where his sympathies lay. On the same day Cardinal Giuliano della Rovere was named suburbicarian Bishop of Ostia. Della Rovere and Balue were met at the gate of Rome by nearly all the Cardinals on 3 February 1483, and shortly thereafter were received in public Consistory.

=== Rome ===
From that time Cardinal Balue lived in high favour at the court of Rome. King Louis XI died on 30 August 1483, thereby closing a chapter of struggle over Balue's status. In 1484 Balue was sent to France as Legate a latere, by Pope Sixtus IV, but he was not received there as such. He did visit his diocese of Angers, and was solemnly received on 24 July 1484. He made a solemn entry into Paris on 20 August 1484. He returned to Rome on 8 February 1485.

Pope Sixtus IV had died on 12 August 1484, while Balue was in Angers. He did not participate in the Conclave that elected Pope Innocent VIII on 29 August.

In February 1485 Cardinal Balue was named French ambassador to the Court of Rome and Protector of France by King Charles VIII. He and Cardinal della Rovere were to work to bring Innocent VIII over to the French side, and to favor the French claim, in the person of René of Anjou, to the Kingdom of Naples. On 5 March 1486, arguments in Consistory between Cardinal Balue and Cardinal Ascanio Sforza, a relative and supporter of Ferdinand of Naples, grew so heated that Pope Innocent had to silence them both. Envoys of Charles VIII and René reached Rome in May 1486, prepared to conclude negotiations, but the diplomacy of Ferdinand of Aragon, the operations of the condottiere Broccolino Guzzoli, and the appearance of Turkish ships in the Adriatic, put a stop to the French adventure.

In 1485, following the wishes of Pope Innocent VIII, Cardinal Balue instituted the Feast of the Visitation in the diocese of Angers, to which, however, he never returned.

On 14 March 1491, Cardinal Balue was promoted Bishop of Palestrina.

He died at Ripatransone, a village fifty-six miles south of Ancona, where he was serving as Rector of the Marches of Ancona, on 5 October 1491. His funeral took place in Rome on 18 October, and he was buried in the chapel he had built in Santa Prassede. The Pope was his heir since the Cardinal had left no Last Will and Testament, and the rumor reported by Joannes Burchard, the Master of Ceremonies, was that he was worth some 100,000 ducats.

== Bibliography ==
- Breguet, Emmanuel (1986), "La carrière angevine du cardinal Balue (1457-1491)," in: Annales de Bretagne et des Pays de l'Ouest, XCIII (1986), pp. 155–169. (in French)
- Cardella, Lorenzo (1793). Memorie storiche de'cardinali della santa Romana chiesa (in Italian). Vol. Tomo Terzo. Roma: Pagliarini. pp. 165–172. (in Italian)
- Déprez, M. E. (1899) "La trahison du Cardinal Balue (1469) (Chanson et ballades inédites)," in: Mélanges d'archéologie et d'histoire (in French). Paris: École franca̧ise de Rome. 1899. pp. 259–296.
- Fisquet, Honoré (1864). La France pontificale (Gallia Christiana): Métropole de Rouen: Évreux (in French). Paris: Etienne Repos. pp. 47–50.
- Forgeot, Henri Léon Joseph (1895). Jean Balue, cardinal d'Angers (1421?-1491). (bound with other matter) (in French). Paris: É. Bouillon.
