= Saint Taurinus =

Venerated as a saint by the Catholic Church

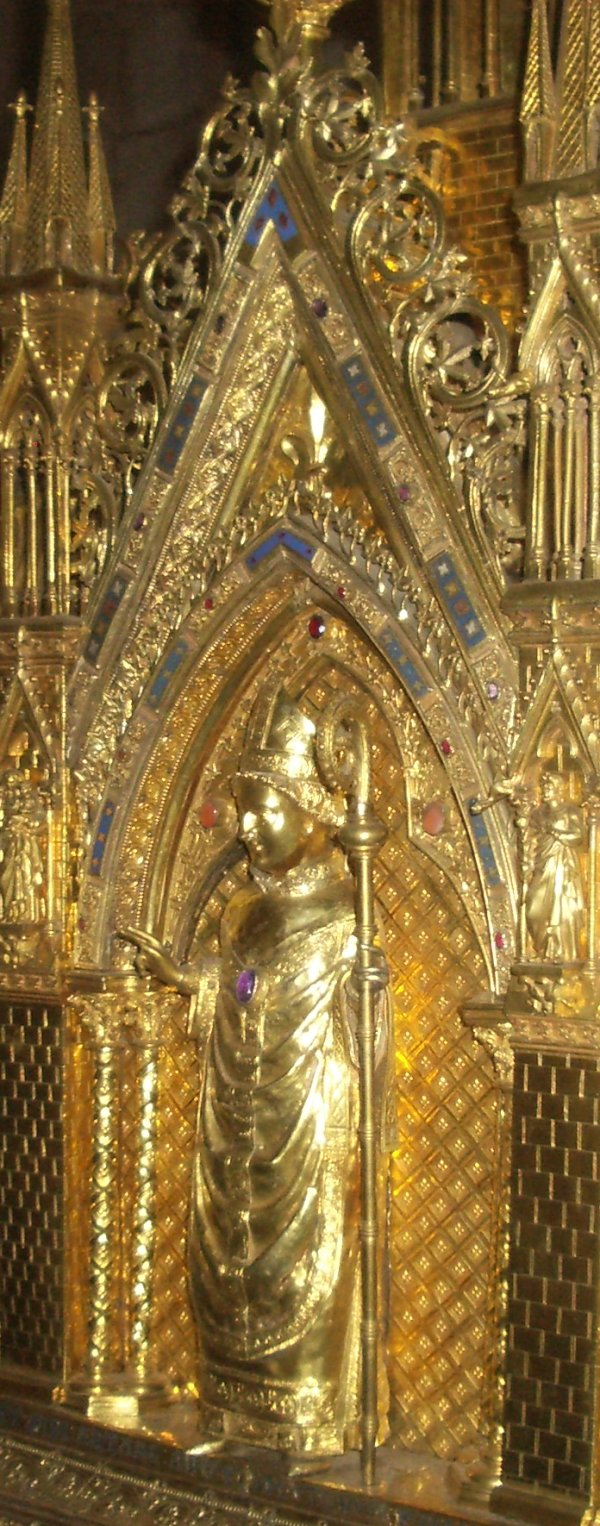
- Detail of the Chasse of Saint Taurinus.
- Born: c. 4th century Ancient Rome, Roman Empire
- Died: c. 412; Mediolanum Aulercorum (Évreux), Gallia Lugdunensis, Roman Empire
- Venerated in: Roman Catholic Church; Eastern Orthodox Church
- Major shrine: Évreux
- Feast: August 12
- Attributes: Bishop's crozier
- Patronage: Diocese of Évreux

Taurinus of Évreux (died ca. 412), also known as Taurin, is venerated as a saint by the Catholic Church. His legend states that he was the first bishop of Évreux. He evangelized the region and died a martyr.

== Legend ==
His largely legendary life is known through a manuscript of the 10th century, itself based on a ninth-century text. The legendary life was written by a monk named Deodatus, who added details according to the standard passiones of the time, mixing factual information with wonderful stories. The garbling of dates and traditions thus ensures that it is impossible to date the time of Taurinus' episcopacy, although scholars usually place it at the beginning of the fourth or in the middle of the fifth century.

Taurinus was born in Rome to Tarquinius, a heathen, and Eustycia (Eusticie, Euticia), a devout Christian. An angel appeared to Eustycia to announce that her son would have a great destiny. He was baptized by Pope Clement I; Denis the Areopagite (misidentified with Denis, first bishop of Paris), who was considered one of the first disciples of Paul, was his godfather. According to Louis Duchesne this legend arose about the ninth century, when Abbot Hilduin of Saint-Denis was intent on proving the identity of Dionysius the Areopagite with Dionysius (Denis), first Bishop of Paris. Thus, the legend assured that there was an "apostolic succession" from Paul directly to the episcopate of Évreux.

Taurinus became bishop of Evreux around 385. His legend states that Taurinus faced a demon at Évreux that took three shapes: that of a lion, a bear and a buffalo. These metamorphoses either represented various deadly sins, or represented the official Roman religion (lion), the worship of Diana (bear), and the local agrarian-based religions (the buffalo). According to Orderic Vitalis in his Historia Ecclesiastica, Taurinus expelled the demon from the local temple of Diana, and when it obeyed his order to break its own idols it was not immediately cast into the Pit, but was instead punished by remaining in the place where it had ruled while seeing the people it had tormented saved. He reported that it was known by the local people as Gobelinus, and still haunted Évreux, appearing in various shapes, but hurt no-one. Taurinus then converted the local pagan temple into a church, dedicating it to the Virgin Mary. Two priests of the goddess, Cambise and Zara, had attempted to stop Taurinus from entering the temple, but they were immobilized after the bishop made the sign of the cross. They then asked to be converted to Christianity.

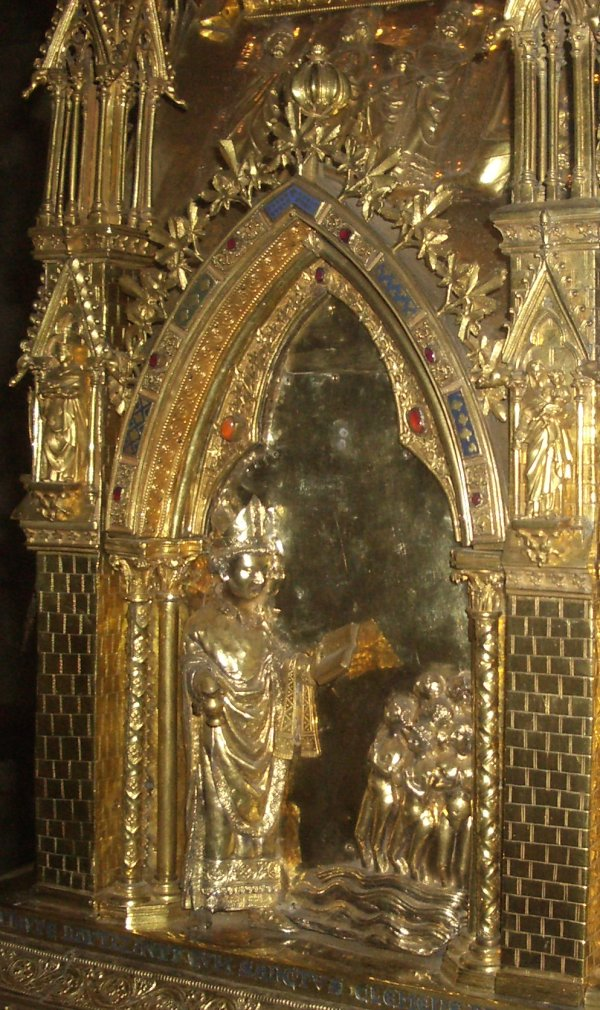
Relief depicting Taurinus converting people to Christianity.

A number of miracles were associated with Taurinus. His legend states that he raised a girl, Euphrasia, from the dead after she died in a fire. After he had done so, there was no trace of burn marks on her. Taurinus’ miracle led to 120 converts. Taurinus also brought back to life Marinus, the son of the local prefect, who had fallen into a hole and died from the impact. After a short prayer, Taurinus revived the young man. At once, Marinus requested baptism for himself and his entourage, and 1200 other people.

After Taurinus' death, Maximus of Evreux was sent by Pope Damasus I to continue his predecessor's work.

== Veneration ==
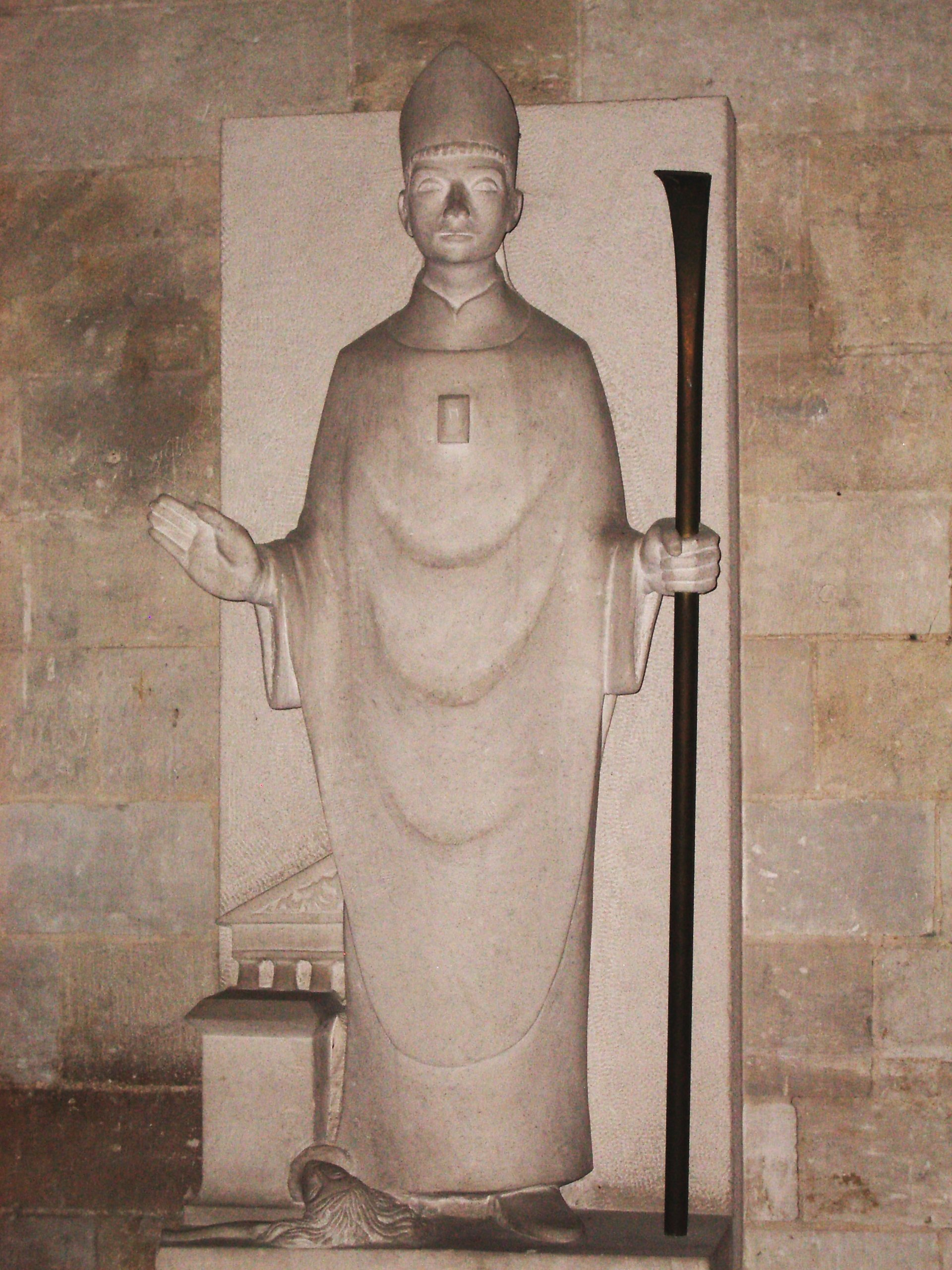
Modern statue of Taurinus.

A monastery dedicated to Taurinus was built around the sixth century; it was restored in the tenth century at the instigation of Richard I of Normandy.

Bishop Landulphus is credited with having discovered, in answer to fervent prayer, the relics of Taurinus; he built a basilica in the Taurinus's honour. Taurinus' relics were translated to various places. In 892, Bishop Sebarius (Sébar) transferred some of his relics to Lezoux (Puy-de-Dôme). Some of this Lezoux group of relics was later carried to the Abbey of Cluny. In the ninth century, at the time of the invasion of the Normans, the remaining group was transferred to Gigny (Jura), and their presence there is attested as of the 12th century. Other relics were deposited in the church of Pézy before being transferred in 1024 to Chartres Cathedral.

In 1035, the abbey of Saint-Taurin was placed under the jurisdiction of the Abbey of Fécamp, which also claimed the body of Taurinus. The monks of Saint-Taurin claimed that they owned a part of the saint's relics. In 1247, Gislebert de Saint-Martin, abbot of Saint-Taurin, had a reliquary (see gallery) built to house the remaining relics.

Taurinus is the patron saint of the Diocese of Evreux.

== Notes ==
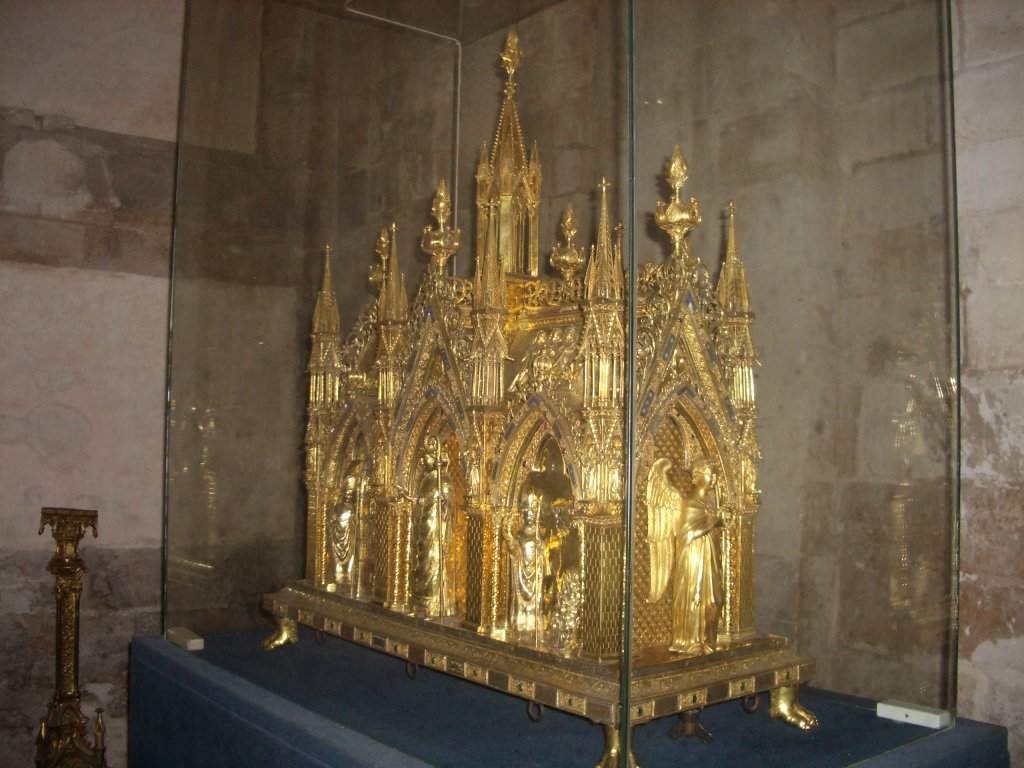

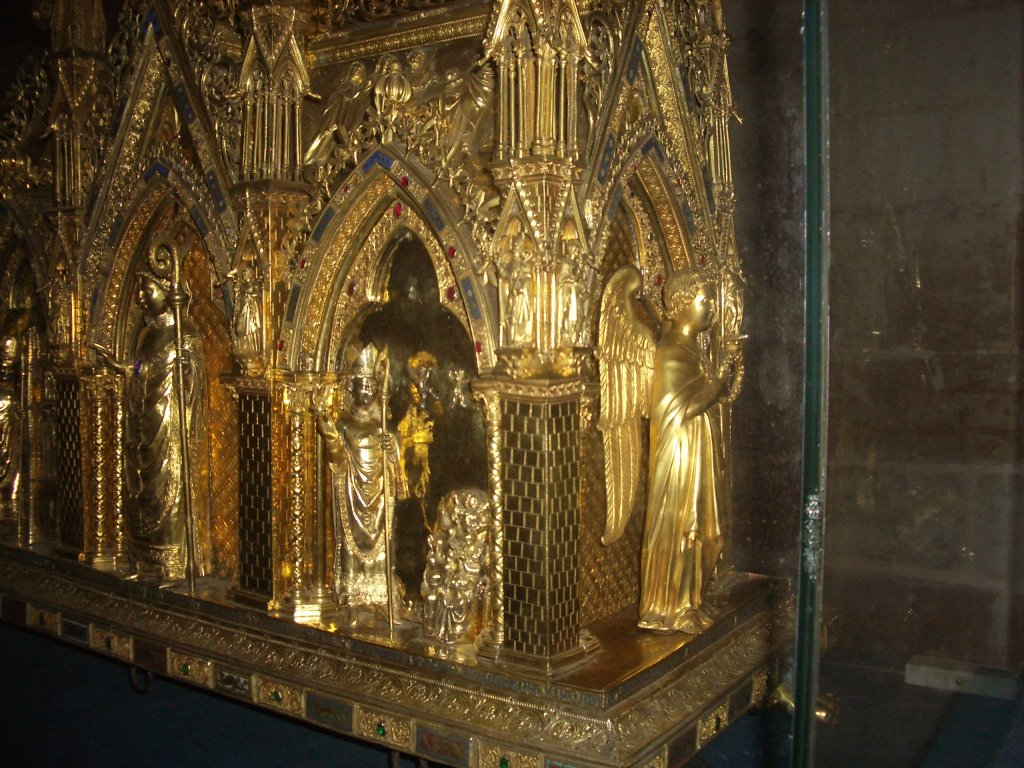

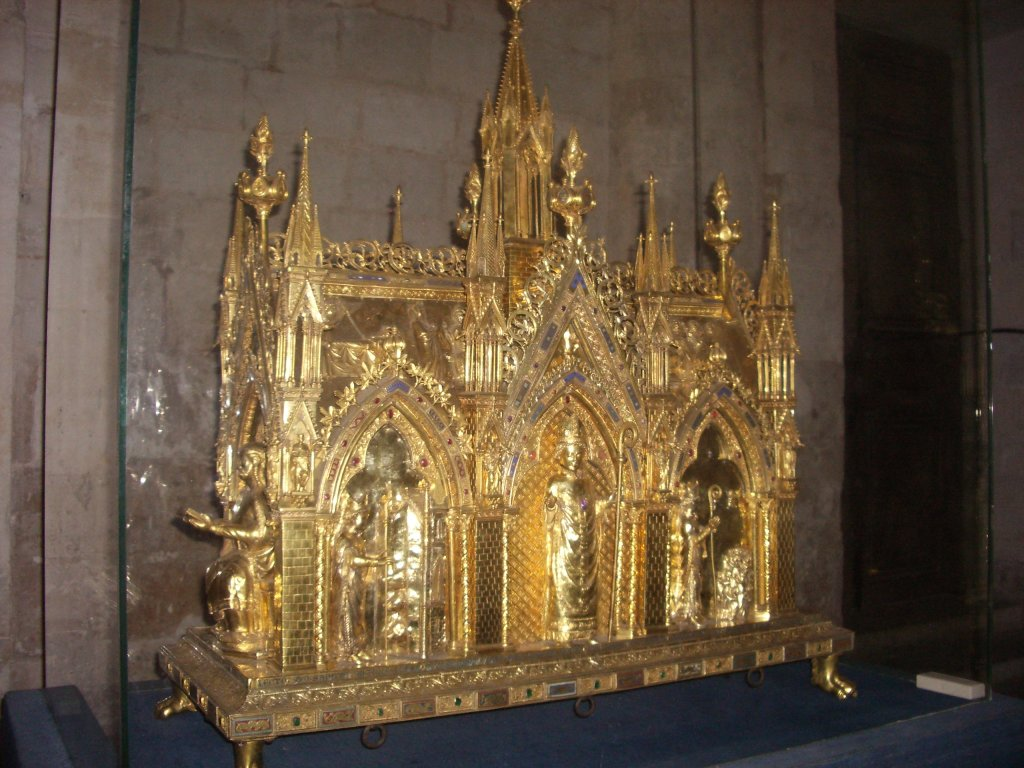

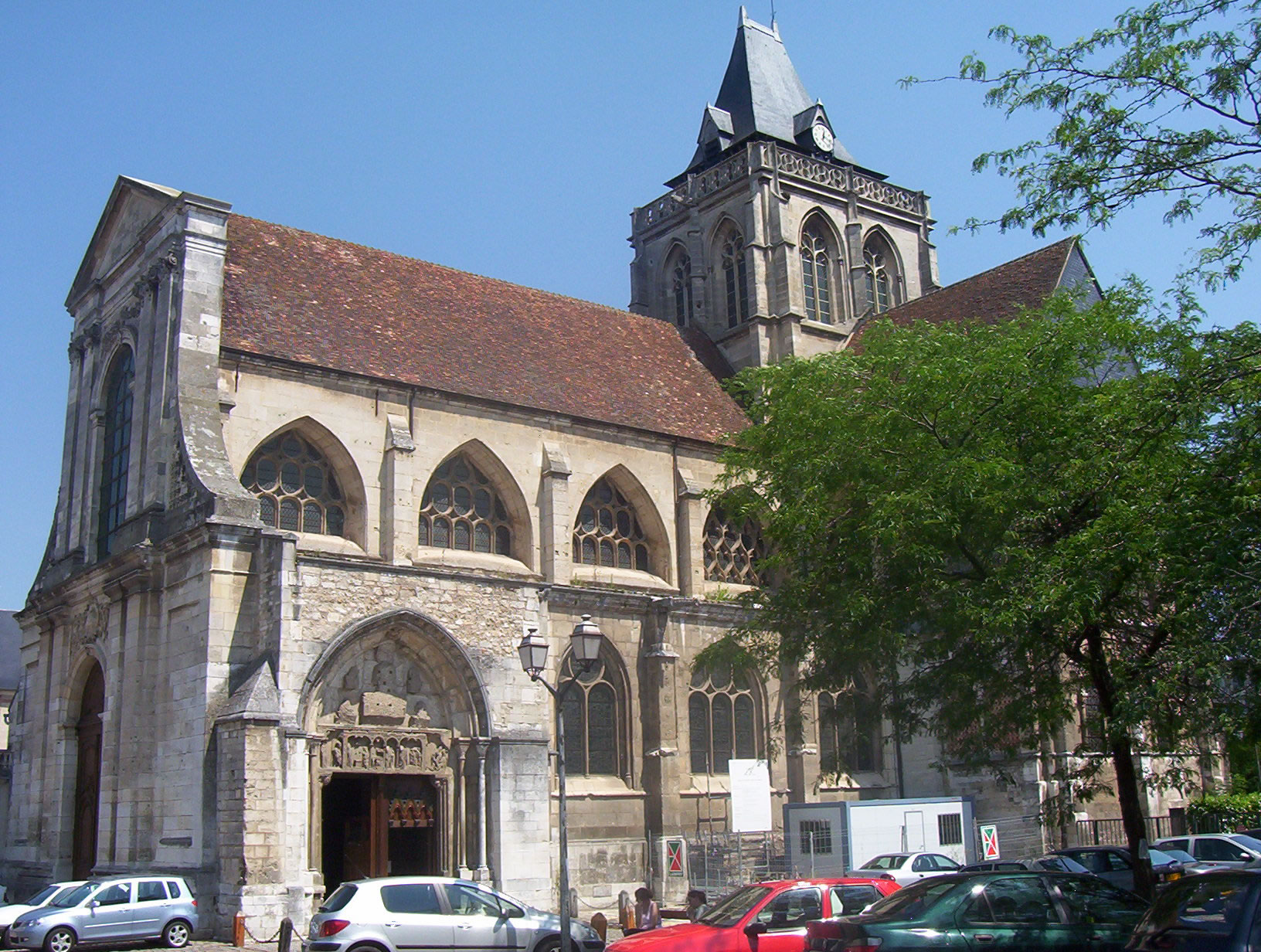
The Church of Saint-Taurin, Évreux

== Sources ==
- La Légende de saint Taurin - A.M. Baudot - 1929
- Les Saints du diocèse d'Évreux - Abbé de Bouclon
- Histoire du diocèse d'Évreux - Chanoine Bonnenfant - Paris - 1933
- Histoire et géographie du département de l'Eure - Rateau et Pinet - 1870 - Réédition 1988
- Connaissance de l'Eure - Juillet 1991 - Numéro 81 - pages 26–27 - Jacques Charles
- Connaissance de l'Eure - 1988 - Jacques Charles
