= 1261 papal election =

Election of Catholic Pope Urban IV

Papal election 1261

Dates and location
- 26 May – 29 August 1261; Palazzo dei Papi di Viterbo

Election
- Ballots: 80

Elected pope
- Jacques Pantaléon; Name taken: Urban IV
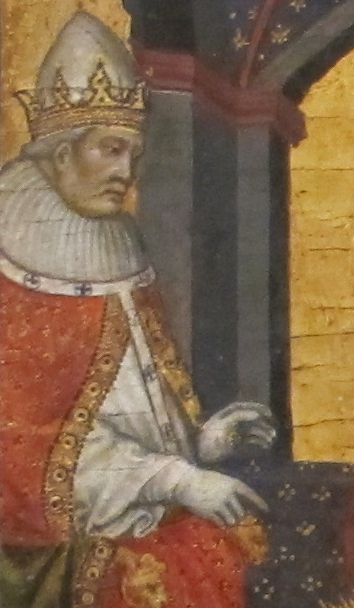

The 1261 papal election (26 May – 29 August) took place after the death of Pope Alexander IV on 25 May and chose Pope Urban IV as his successor. Since Pope Alexander had been resident in Viterbo since the first week of May 1261, the meeting of the cardinals to elect his successor took place in the Episcopal Palace at Viterbo, which was next to the Cathedral of S. Lorenzo. The actual date of the beginning of the Electoral Meeting (there were, as yet, no Conclaves) is unknown. If the canon of Pope Boniface III (A.D. 607) were still in effect (and there is no reason to think that it was not), then the Election could not begin until the third day after the Pope's burial.

== Background ==
Alexander IV had unwisely continued to pursue the policy of hostility against the Hohenstaufen dynasty which had been begun by Pope Gregory IX. In 1261 the claimant was Conradin, King of Sicily since 1254, but he had been supplanted by his uncle and guardian, Manfred. This was not to the liking of Pope Alexander, who claimed the overlordship of south Italy and Sicily and the guardianship over young Conradin. Immediately on his accession Alexander excommunicated Manfred. Manfred had himself crowned King of Sicily at Palermo on 10 August 1258.

== Cardinals, 1261 ==
Pope Alexander IV (1254-1261), sensitive to charges of nepotism made against his predecessor, Innocent IV (Fieschi), had appointed no cardinals at all. Two cardinals besides Alexander himself had died since the last election in 1254 (Gil Torres and Guilelmo Fieschi); otherwise the electors were the same.

Elector	Origins	Order	Title	Date of creation	by Pope	Notes
Otto (Eudes or Odo of Chateauroux, Castro Radulfi), O.Cist.	Diocese of Bourges, France	Cardinal-bishop	Bishop of Tusculum (Frascati)	28 May 1244	Innocent IV	on 8 July 1255 he was appointed to the Committee to judge Joachim de Fiore.
John of Toledo (John Tolet)	English	Cardinal-priest	Bishop of Porto	28 May 1244	Innocent IV	A supporter of Henry III of England; served sixty years in the Roman Curia
Stephanus de Vancsa (Istvan Bancsa)	Hungary	Cardinal-bishop	Bishop of Palestrina	December 1251	Innocent IV	Archbishop of Strigonia (Esztergom) (1243-1254)
Hughes de Saint-Cher, OP	Vienne, Dauphiné	Cardinal-priest	Title of Santa Sabina on the Aventine	28 May 1244	Innocent IV	Legate in Germany, 1253
Riccardo Annibaldi	Roman	Cardinal-deacon	Deacon of S. Angelo in Pescheria	1237	Gregory IX	Archpriest of the Vatican Basilica.
Ottaviano degli Ubaldini	Florence	Cardinal-deacon	Deacon of Santa Maria in Via Lata	28 May 1244	Innocent IV	Apostolic Legate in the Kingdom of Sicily, from January 1255.
Giovanni Gaetano Orsini	Rome	Cardinal-deacon	Deacon of S. Niccolo in Carcere	28 May 1244	Innocent IV	Alexander IV assigned him the tituli of S. Crisogono and S. Maria in Trastevere in commendam on 22 June 1259 future Pope Nicholas III (1277-1280)
Ottobono Fieschi	Genoa	Cardinal-deacon	Deacon of Archpriest of S. Adriano	December 1251	Innocent IV	Archpriest of S. Maria Maggiore. Archdeacon of Reims.

== Bibliography ==
- Charles Bourel de la Roncière, Les registres d' Alexandre IV, recueils des bulles de ce pape (Paris:Fontemoing 1895-1896).
- Léon Dorez et Jean Guiraud, Les registres d' Urbain IV, recueils des bulles de ce pape (Paris:Fontemoing 1892-1904).
- Edouard Jordan, Les registres de Clement IV, recueils des bulles de ce pape (Paris:Fontemoing 1893).
- Gregorius, Dean of Bayeux and Thierry Vaucouleurs, Vita Urbani Papae Quarti a Gregorio Decano Ecclesiae Bajocassium et a Theodorico Vallicolore scripta (ed. A. Assier) (Troyes 1854).
- Artaud de Montor, Alexis F., The Lives and Times of the Popes Volume III (New York 1910), pp. 134–160.
- Baronius, Cardinal Cesare: Augustinus Theiner (editor), Caesaris S. R. E. Cardinalis Baronii Annales Ecclesiastici 21 (Bar-le-Duc 1870).
- Cerrini, Simonetta, "Urbano IV," Enciclopedia dei Papi (2000) (Treccani on-line)
- Cristofori, Francesco, Le tombe dei papi in Viterbo (Siena 1887).
- Georges, Étienne, Histoire de Pape Urbain IV et de son temps, 1185-1264 (Arcis-sur-Aube 1866).
- Gobry, I., Deux papes champenois, Urbain II et Urbain IV (Troyes 1994).
- Gregorovius, Ferdinand, History of Rome in the Middle Ages, Volume V. part 2 second edition, revised (London: George Bell, 1906) Book X, Chapter 1, pp. 335–358.
- Hampe, Karl, Urban IV und Manfred (1261-1264) (Heidelberg: Carl Winter 1905).
- Karst, August, Geschichte Manfreds vom Tode Friedrichs II. bis zu seiner Krönung (1250-1258) (Berlin: E. Ebering 1897).
- Levi, Guido, "Il Cardinale Ottaviano degli Ubaldini, secondo il suo carteggio ed altri documenti," Archivio della Società Romana di storia patria 14 (1891), 231-303.
- Mann, Horace K., The lives of the popes in the early Middle Ages Volume 14 (1928).
- Maubach, J., Die Kardinäle und ihre Politik um die Mitte des XIII. Jahrhunderts (Bonn 1902).
- Miller, E. Konradin von Hohenstaufen (Berlin 1897).
- Parravicini Bagliani, Agostino, Cardinali di curia e "familiae" cardinaliste, dal 1227 al 1254 Volume II (Padua 1972).
- Paravicini Bagliani, A., "Gregorio da Napoli, biografo di Urbano IV," Römische Historische Mitteilungen 11 (1969), pp. 59–78.
- Pispisa, Enrico, Il regno di Manfredi. Proposte di interpretazione (Messina 1991).
- Sägmüller, J.B., Thätigkeit und Stellung der Kardinale bis Papst Bonifaz VIII. (Freiburg i.Br.: Herder 1896).
- Sibilia, Salvatore, Alessandro IV (1254-1261) (Anagni 1961).
- Tenckhoff, F., Papst Alexander IV. (Paderborn 1907).
- Villani, Giovanni, Cronica di Giovanni Villani (edited by F. G. Dragomani) Vol. 1 (Firenze 1844)
