= Johannes de Deo (died 1267) =

Rubric from the start of the Liber poenitentiarius in an Austrian manuscript of c. 1400. The elongated initial belongs to Incipit liber ('the book begins') and the name Johanne de Deo is in the third line from the top.

Johannes de Deo (c. 1190 – 15 March 1267) was a Portuguese priest, judge and scholar of canon law who taught for over twenty years at the University of Bologna. He was a prolific writer.

== Life ==
Johannes was called Hispanus, meaning a native of the Iberian Peninsula. He was born in Silves during the brief period when it was held by King Sancho I of Portugal between 1189 and 1191. He refers to himself as a priest, and seems to have been ordained in Lisbon before studying at the University of Bologna. He studied canon law and possibly civil law at Bologna from 1223 until 1229. His main teacher was the archpriest Zoen. He was a professor at Bologna from 1229 until at least 1255. He appears to have been a doctor of both laws. The titles he uses of himself are doctor decretorum (doctor of decrees) and utriusque juris professor (professor of both laws).

In 1241, Johannes acquired a canonry in the cathedral of Lisbon. In 1247, he arbitrated a dispute in Bologna. He served as a judge on several occasions, including on occasion as a judge delegate of Popes Innocent IV and Alexander IV. By March 1260, he had left Bologna to become archdeacon of Santarém in the diocese of Lisbon. He continued to work as an arbitrator and judge in Portugal. One of his cases involved the monastery of Santa Cruz in Coimbra and the philosopher Pedro Julião, the future Pope John XXI. Johannes died in Lisbon on 15 March 1267.

== Works ==
Johannes wrote numerous works in Latin on canon law:

- Casus decretalium cum canonibus concordantesor Concordatis (before 1238), mentioned in the Liber iudicum
- Breviarium decretorum or Decretum abbreviatum (before 1238), mentioned in the Liber iudicum, little more than a table of contents for the Decretum
- Distinctiones super toto iure canonico (before 1238), mentioned in the Liber iudicum
- Arbor versificata (before 1238), mentioned in the Liber iudicum, a collection of mnemonic doggerel verse for the aid of his students, popular and widely copied
- Chronica a tempore beati Petri hucusque qualiter subcreverit ecclesia inter Turbines et Procellas (before 1238), mentioned in the Liber iudicum
- Liber iudicum (1236 or 1246), a treatise on judicial process divided into four books on judges, plaintiffs, defendants and advocates
- Epistulae canonicae de decimis (30 May 1240)
- Apparatus [super toto corpore] decretorum (before 1241)
- Notabilia cum summis super titulis decretalium [et decretorum] (September 1241), dedicated to Cardinal Gil Torres
- Casus legum canonizatarum quae inter canones continentur et unde babeant ortum in libris legalitbus (1 September 1242)
- Summa super quatuor causis decretorum (1243), a continuation of the Summa of Huguccio which contains a list of his earlier works
- Liber dispensationum (28 August 1243), dedicated to the Dominican and Franciscan orders, contains a list of his earlier works and was submitted to Innocent IV for corrections
- Liber pastoralis (August 1244), dedicated to Cardinal Guglielmo Fieschi
- Principium decretalium (after 1245), an important source for the history of the Quinque compilationes antiquae
- Liber poenitentiarius (or poenitentialis) de cautela simplicium sacerdotum (28 October 1247), a penitential dedicated to Bishop Airas of Lisbon and heavily reliant on the Summa de casibus poenitentiae of Raymond of Peñafort, is divided into seven books containing a list of 112 sins and their corresponding penances, all cited to authoritative canons
- Liber quaestionum (6 September 1248), dedicated to Cardinal Ottaviano Ubaldino
- Cavillationes or Liber cavillationum (2 September 1246), contains a dedication to Guglielmo Fieschi added after 1248 and a list of thirteen of his earlier works
- Concordantiae decretorum cum titulis decretalium (after 1248)
- Liber opinionum (1251), submitted to Innocent IV for corrections in October 1251
- De abusibus contra canones (n.d.), an appendix to the Liber poenitentiarius
- Catalogus haereticorum
- Commentum super novellis decretalium
- De electione
- Flos decretorum
- Lecturae super decretalibus, readings of the Decretals
- Liber primarius de varii juris pontifici materiis
- Liber distinctionum
- Quaestiones de processu canonico
- Summa de sponsalibus
- Summa moralis
- Summula super decimis ecclesiasticis, a letter to the Dominican order requesting preaching on the duty to tithe with a prologue addressed to Alexander IV and the College of Cardinals
- Tabula decreti
- Tabula decretorum

In addition, some glosses on the Arbor actionum of John Bassianus are attributed to Johannes de Deo. Johannes dedicated several of his works to Zoen. Although his work as a whole is not very original, it is valuable to historians for its citations of sources. It was more highly regarded and circulated widely up to the end of the 15th century. There are many manuscripts that carry his work. Johannes Andreae had a low opinion of the Arbor versificata, which he said was so difficult and obscure as to make known things unknown. William Durantis relied heavily on Johannes.

Johannes argued that the Crusades were just wars, that is, wars justified by the right of defence under natural law. His Liber poenitentiarius became the new standard for penitentials.

Few of Johannes' works have been printed. An exception is Principium decretalium, which has been edited by Hermann Kantorowicz.
