= 1254 papal election =

Election of Catholic Pope Alexander IV

Papal election 1254

Dates and location
- 11–12 December 1254; Naples

Elected pope
- Rinaldo dei Conti; Name taken: Alexander IV

The 1254 papal election (11–12 December) took place following the death of Pope Innocent IV and ended with the choice of Raynaldus de' Conti, who took the name Pope Alexander IV. The election was held in Naples, in the former palazzo of Pietro della Vigna, and required only one day.

Innocent IV (Fieschi), who was elected on 25 June 1243, after a vacancy that had lasted more than nineteen months, undertook as his most important task the destruction of Frederick II, who had been excommunicated by his predecessor Gregory IX (Ugo dei Conti di Segni) on 20 March 1239, and by numerous other cardinals and bishops. He was compelled to flee from Rome on 7 June 1244; he reached Genoa on 7 July, suffering from a fever and dysentery. There he remained until October, 1244, when he crossed the Alps, reaching Lyons at the end of November. There he remained, living in exile, until the middle of April 1251. He held a church council at Lyons in 1245, with some 150 bishops, a disappointing number, and issued an order deposing Frederick from the Imperial throne, and his son Conrad as well. Louis IX of France attempted to mediate a peace, but was unsuccessful. Both parties wanted blood. There was even an assassination attempt against the life of Frederick, led by Tibaldo Francesco, a former Podestà of Parma, who had been promised the Crown of Sicily (Only the Pope can invest a person with the fief of Sicily). When Frederick discovered the plot, 150 people were executed. In May, 1246, a new King of the Romans was elected in opposition to Frederick with the active support of the Pope, Henry Raspe Landgraf of Thurungia. Henry managed to defeat Conrad in battle at Nidda in August 1246, but death prevented him from following up on his success. A new emperor, William of Holland, was likewise elected, in October 1247, but he was defeated by Conrad in 1250. Frederick's best friend, Peter de la Vigne, was accused of attempting to assassinate Frederick through poison; he was tried and blinded, but before he could be confined for life (or worse), he committed suicide (1249). Frederick insisted that the moving force behind the plot had been the Pope. While campaigning in Italy, Frederick died of dysentery on 13 December 1250. He left the crown of Sicily, his initial inheritance, to his son Conrad IV, and, failing him, to his son Henry; or, if Henry was unavailable, in the last event to his legitimized son Manfred. Pope Innocent was impelled to eject the Hohenstaufen, and offered the rule to Richard of Cornwall, the brother of King Henry III of England, both before and after the death of Conrad, and then to Charles d'Anjou, the brother of Louis IX of France.

Next April, Innocent began his homeward journey, by sea from Marseille to Genoa; he spent the summer in Lombardy, and arrived in Bologna in mid-October, 1251. He reached Perugia at the beginning of November, 1251, where he resided until the end of April, 1253, when he moved to Assisi. He left Assisi at the beginning of October, 1253, and finally reached Rome by 12 October. He stayed at the Lateran, until the end of April, 1254, when he returned to Assisi for the rest of the spring. He travelled next to Anagni, arriving by 2 June, where he stayed until 8 October, when he made a visit to Montecassino, Capua and Naples. He died in Naples on 7 December 1254.

But Innocent IV had not returned to Italy in 1251, to enjoy the peace and happiness consequent on the death of the Church's great enemy. The Church had been seriously damaged during the war between Frederick and Gregory IX and then Frederick and Innocent IV. Already in 1246, if Matthew of Paris is to be believed, there was a confrontation between Innocent and Cardinal Johannes Toletanus, who was defending the English who were refusing to pay the Pope's exorbitant tax demands, even under threat of interdict. Toletanus wrote:

May God forgive you your wrath, Lord, if I may speak frankly, you should try to control your wild temper, since the times are so bad. The Holy Land has difficulties; the Greek Church is moving away from us; Frederick, who is equal to or more powerful than any Christian prince, opposes us. You and we, who are the support of the Church, are driven from the seat of the papacy, from Rome, and even from Italy. Hungary, with its great territory, awaits its destruction at the hands of the Turk. Germany is torn with civil war. Spain is raging to the length of cutting out the tongues of bishops. France, already impoverished by us, is conspiring against us. England, frequently troubled by our injuries, now at length wounded by our blows and injured by our spurs, like Balaam's ass speaks and protests and complains that its burden is intolerable and that its injury is beyond remedy. We, like the Jews, hated by all, provoke all to hate us.

== Innocent, Conrad, and Manfred ==
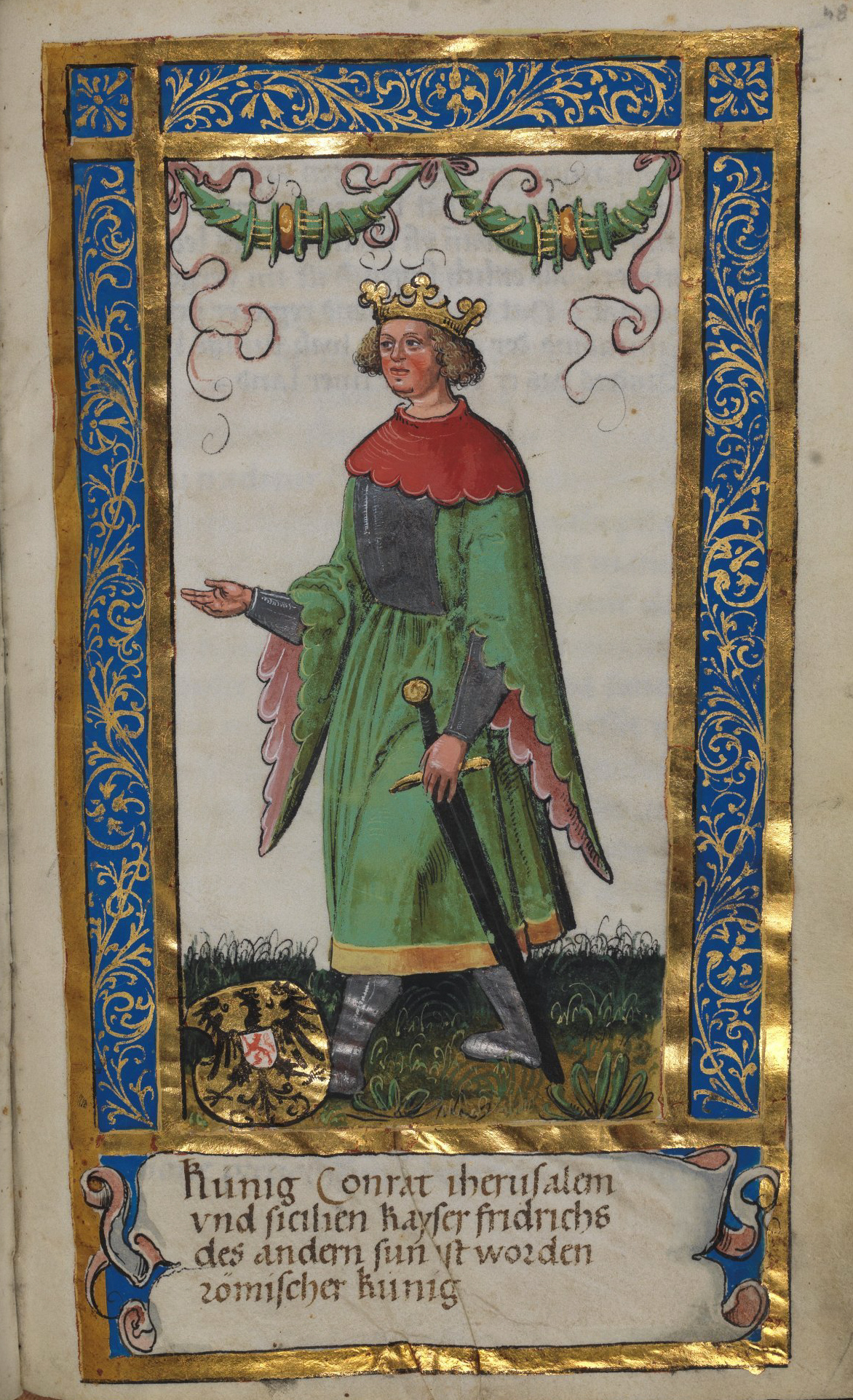
Conrad IV

Innocent had a major reconstructive task ahead of him, to recover the lands and goods of the Church, and to reinvigorate the hierarchy in Lombardy, Tuscany and the Kingdom of Naples. It would have to be pressed forward in the face of the opposition of Frederick's sons. As Innocent arrived in Bologna, Conrad, having arranged his affairs for the present in Germany, crossed the Brenner Pass, stopped at Verona and then at Goito, where he met the Imperial Vicars for Italy. The affairs of Lombardy were put in order for the moment. Whatever Innocent had been able to achieve during his tour of Lombardy was nullified. Conrad then took ship and arrived at Siponto in January 1252. A diet was held in Frederick's capital of Foggia in February, 1252, where he worked to please the people, win over the barons, and do what he could to enter into friendly relations with the Universities at Naples and Salerno. The business was especially delicate since he had to deal with his younger brother Manfred, who had been regent of the Kingdom of Naples and Sicily for Frederick, and was still the powerful Prince of Taranto.

In October 1253, Naples fell to Conrad. It was the last Hohenstaufen possession to hold out against the brothers. But suspicion between brothers caused Conrad to strip Manfred of nearly all of his gains, except the Principality of Taranto, which had been left him by his father the Emperor Frederick. Conrad, however, died suddenly, of malaria, on 21 May 1254. On 8 October, Pope Innocent set off to the south, with a papal army commanded by his nephew, the Legate Cardinal Guglielmo Fieschi, intent upon putting an end to Manfred and end once and for all the Hohenstaufen threat to the Papacy. On 23 October 1254, Innocent, who was at Capua at the time, detached Amalfi from its traditional obedience to the Kings of Sicily and received it directly into his own power. This was a direct threat to Manfred and his control of the Kingdom of Naples. On 26 October, Manfred fled from Teano, whose loyalty was doubtful, and fled to his loyal Saracens in the town of Lucera. At Lucera he had access to the Imperial treasury, with which he could pay his troops. From Lucera he led an army, principally composed of Germans (and deserters from the papal army), against the papal army. The armies met at Foggia on 2 December, and the Papal army was soundly defeated. Four thousand papal mercenaries were killed. Cardinal Guglielmo fled to Naples. Five days after the battle, on the Feast of S. Andrew, 7 December, around the time of Vespers, Innocent IV himself died, attended by the spiritual ministrations of Cardinal Rinaldo dei Conti di Segni. He and the Papal Curia had been staying in Naples, the Pope occupying the palazzo that had once belonged to Frederick II's secretary, Peter de la Vigne. The only evidence of the cause of his death comes from Matthew of Paris, who states that, on the road from Capua to Naples, the Pope suffered a sudden and sharp attack of pleurisy, which could have had any of a number of causes. Remarkably for the times, poison is not mentioned. He was treated by Cardinal John of Toledo, to no avail. On 8 December, the body was buried in the Cathedral of Naples.

== Election ==
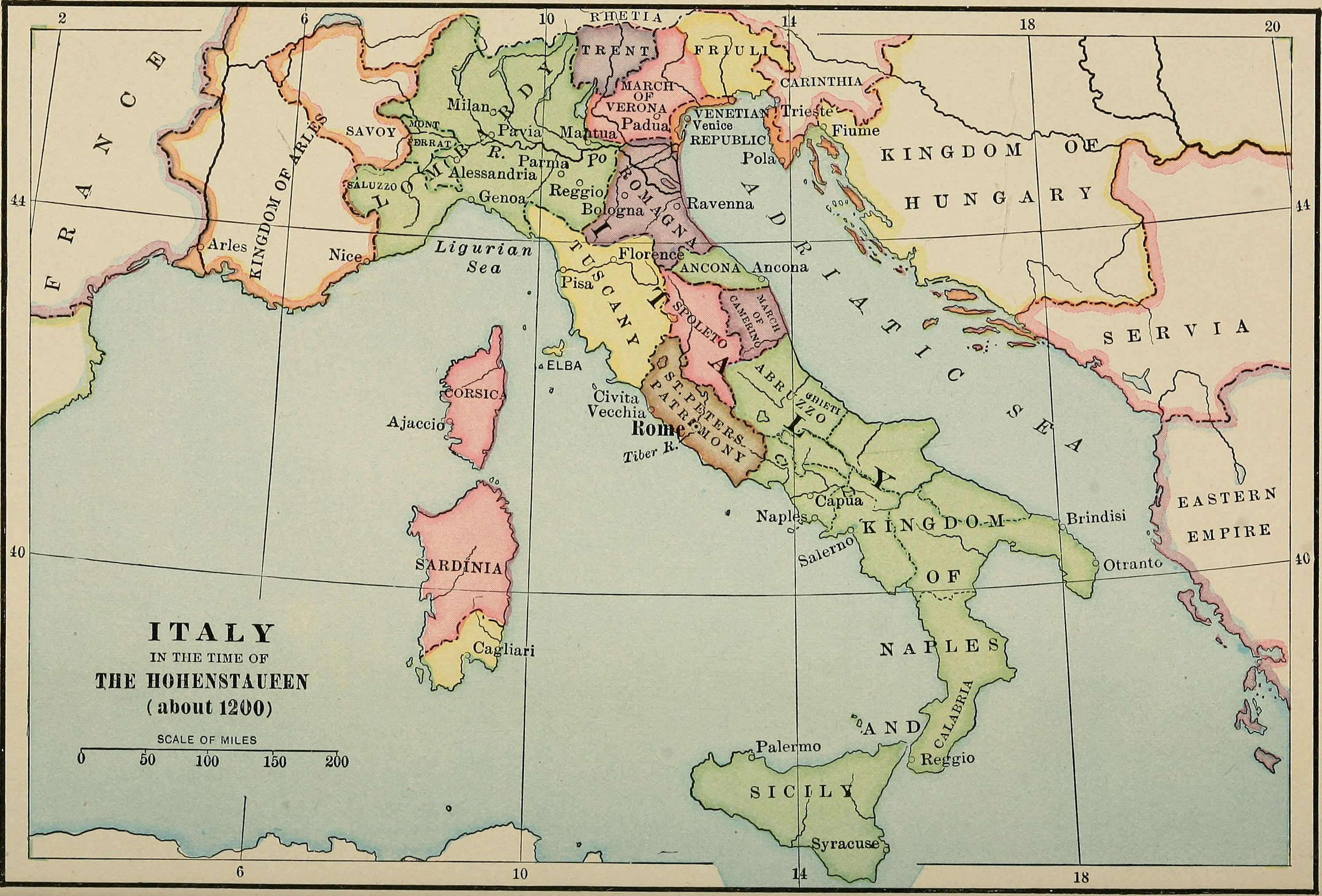
Italy in the 13th century

The first to react to the disaster at Foggia was the Podesta of the city of Naples, Beretholinus Tavernerius, a citizen of Parma. He had the gates of the city closed immediately. It is said that he did this to prevent the cardinals from leaving the city and taking the Election anywhere else. This was not done out of anything so inane as city pride. He knew that Manfred was likely to attempt to capitalize on his unexpected victory, and that Naples would be the prime target. It would require a pope, around whom the troops could rally, by whom the troops could be paid, whose troops would defend Naples as long as the Pope and Roman Curia were in residence. Closing the gates was not a step leading to the idea of a Conclave, but only a wise and prudent measure to defend everyone's best interests by getting a pope as soon as possible. News was brought to the remains of the papal army at Ariano that the Pope was dead, by certain cardinals (perhaps including Ottobono Fieschi whose family had much to lose and perhaps much to gain), who advised that the Legate, Cardinal Gulielmo Fieschi, should join them to elect a pope. They therefore left Ariano as quickly as possible and made for Naples. When they arrived, they were escorted to the tomb of Pope Innocent, and afterward to the palazzo where, with the rest of the Cardinals, they were enclosed.

The Mass of the Holy Spirit was sung on Friday morning, 11 December, and the ten Cardinals who were in Naples settled down to negotiate. Next morning, 12 December, around the third hour of the day, they reached agreement on their senior Cardinal Bishop, Raynaldus de' Conti, who chose the name Alexander IV. He was probably crowned on Sunday, 20 December 1254. The Interregnum had lasted only five days, according to Nicholas de Curbio, an eyewitness.

There is an alternate story. It comes from the pen of Fra Salimbene, O. Min., of Parma, who was a personal friend and sometimes host of Cardinal Ottaviano Fieschi. According to Fra Salimbene's account, the Election immediately ran into a stalemate. This is not unlikely. But Fra Salimbene alleges that the Cardinals chose to employ the rare option, that of the Way of Compromise. He also says that the papal mantle was placed on the shoulders of Cardinal de' Conti by Cardinal Ottaviano Fieschi; this is unusual since the privilege of investing the new pope with the mantle belongs to the senior Cardinal-deacon, who was not Cardinal Ottaviano. Perhaps we are invited by Fra Salimbene to assume that Cardinal Ottaviano was the one who made the Compromise choice. But it can also be imagined that this tale of Fra Salimbene was one told in front of a fire in a monastic refectory, during a cardinalatial visit to Parma. The tale takes no account of the Nicholas de Curbio account, and he was an eyewitness. It likewise flies in the face of the electoral manifesto, Quia fragilis, of Pope Alexander IV, which indicates that the problem was actually to get him to agree to accept the Papacy. In truth, it was a perilous position to be in.

== Cardinals, 1254 ==
Pope Innocent IV had created fifteen cardinals during his reign; six died while he was still Pope. Three cardinals survived from previous reigns.

Elector	Origins	Order	Title	Date of creation	by Pope	Notes
Raynaldus de' Conti	Jenne, near Subiaco	Cardinal-bishop	Bishop of Ostia e Velletri	18 September 1227	Gregory IX	elected Pope Pope Alexander IV (1254-1261)
Stephanus de Vancsa (Istvan Bancsa)	Hungary	Cardinal-bishop	Bishop of Palestrina	28 May 1244	Innocent IV	
Giovanni of Toledo	English	Cardinal-priest	S. Lorenzo in Lucina	28 May 1244	Innocent IV	A supporter of Henry III of England; served sixty years in the Roman Curia.
Hughes de Saint-Cher, OP	Vienne, Dauphiné	Cardinal-priest	Title of Santa Sabina on the Aventine	28 May 1244	Innocent IV	Legate in Germany, 1253
Gil Torres	Spain	Cardinal-deacon	Deacon of S. Cosma e Damiano	December, 1216	Honorius III	He died in 1254 or 1255
Riccardo Annibaldi	Roman	Cardinal-deacon	Deacon of S. Angelo in Pescheria	1237	Gregory IX	Rector of Campagna and Marittima; nephew of Cardinal Rinaldo Conti de Segni
Octavianus (Ottaviano) Ubaldini	Florence	Cardinal-deacon	Deacon of Santa Maria in Via Lata	28 May 1244	Innocent IV	Archbishop of Bologna (1240-1244), Cardinal (1244-1273); Legate in Lombardy and Romagna from 1247 to 1251.
Giovanni Gaetano Orsini	Rome	Cardinal-deacon	Deacon of S. Niccolo in Carcere	28 May 1244	Innocent IV	future Pope Nicholas III (1277-1280)
Guglielmo Fieschi	Genoa	Cardinal-deacon	Deacon of S. Eustachio	28 May 1244	Innocent IV	nephew of Innocent IV. Legate in Sicily against King Manfred, by whom he was defeated af Foggia on 2 December 1254.
Ottobono Fieschi	Genoa	Cardinal-deacon	Deacon of S. Adriano	December, 1251	Innocent IV	Archpriest of S. Maria Maggiore

== Cardinals not attending ==
Elector	Origins	Order	Title	Date of creation	by Pope	Notes
Odo (Eudes) of Châteauroux (Castro Radulfi), O.Cist.	Diocese of Bourges, France	Cardinal-bishop	Bishop of Tusculum (Frascati)	28 May 1244	Innocent IV	He was with Louis IX of France on Crusade; the King returned on 11 July 1254.
Pietro Capocci	Rome	Cardinal-deacon	Deacon of S. Giorgio ad velum aureum	28 May 1244	Innocent IV	Legate in Germany; he was sent to the German princes with an introduction from Innocent dated 17 April 1254

== Aftermath ==
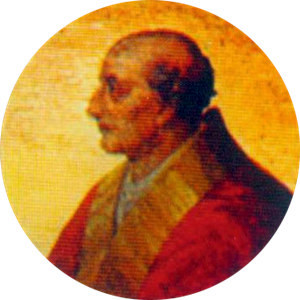
Pope Alexander IV, fantasy portrait in S. Paolo fuori le Mure, Rome.

Cardinal Guglielmo Fieschi's career seems to have ended. He was replaced as Legate with the papal army by Cardinal Ottavio Ubaldini, who was also named Papal Vicar in Calabria and Sicily on 16 January 1255. Manfred's career, as Regent for his brother's infant son, Conradin, blossomed. After the victory at Foggia he conquered or reincorporated into his Kingdom of Sicily Barletta, Venusia, Acherunta, Rapolla, Amalfi, Trani and Bari. Cardinal Ottaviano's mission was to raise an army to oppose him.

Manfred's initial impulse was to avoid contact with the Papal Court, lest any initiative of his might be taken, in the city of Naples and throughout the Kingdom of Sicily, as a sign of weakness. He resisted the advice offered to him by Thomas of Acerno and Richard Filangeli to open negotiations for a peace. The situation changed, however, when a bishop arrived from the Papal Court, with orders to cite Manfred to appear at the Curia by 2 February 1255, the Feast of the Purification, to answer charges of the murder of Burrellus of Anglono and of the injury done by the expulsion of the Papal Legate (Cardinal Guglielmo Fieschi) and the papal army of Apulia. The canonical period in which the citation had to be responded to makes it clear that Pope Alexander IV had taken the decision to pursue Manfred rather than seek peace with him shortly after his Coronation (20 December 1254). Manfred replied in writing, excusing himself on the grounds that it was for the sake of his nephew, and not in opposition to the Roman Church, that he had done what was charged. He continued to refuse to send personal ambassadors to the Pope, and he certainly had no intention of appearing in Naples personally. That would be suicidal—a fact which is a valid rejoinder to the canonical requirement of personal appearance. A papal Notary who was friendly to Manfred, Master Jordanus of Terracina, however, advised that he send ambassadors nonetheless. Eventually Manfred gave way and sent ambassadors to Naples, but when they got to the Papal Court they found that the Pope had already appointed Cardinal Ubaldini as Legate and that Ubaldini had begun to raise an army. Clearly, peace was not part of papal policy, and judicial purgation of crimes nothing but a pretext.

In choosing the course of confrontation with Manfred rather than conciliation, Pope Alexander IV had decided to continue the activist policy of Innocent IV, set in motion in 1251 when he returned to Italy, of completely rooting out the Hohenstaufen from Italy and Sicily. This policy would have consequences for the next thirty years and more. The resistance to Conrad, then Manfred, then Conradin, did not end until 1268, and then only at the cost of bringing the Angevin Charles, brother of Louis IX of France, to rule the Kingdom of Naples.

== Bibliography ==
- Bourel de la Roncière, C. (editor), Les registres d' Alexandre IV Tome premier (Paris 1902).
- Nicolaus de Curbio, O.Min., "Vita Innocentii Papae IV," Ludovico Antonio Muratori, Rerum Italicarum Scriptores Tomus Tertius (Mediolani 1723) pp. 592–592e. (Bishop of Assisi, 1250–ca. 1274; he was Innocent IV's chaplain and confessor)
- Nicolaus de Jamsilla, Historia de rebus gestis Friderici II. Imperatoris (ed. Ferdinando Ughelli) (Naples: Joannes Gravier 1770). (an apologist for Manfred)
- Abulafia, David, Frederick II: A Medieval Emperor (London: Penguin 1988).
- Artaud de Montor, Alexis F., The Lives and Times of the Popes (New York 1911), pp. 134–160.
- Baronius, Cardinal Cesare: Augustinus Theiner (editor), Caesaris S. R. E. Cardinalis Baronii Annales Ecclesiastici 21 (Bar-le-Duc 1870).
- Eubel, Conradus, OFM Conv., Hierarchia Catholici Medii Aevi...ab anno 1198 usque ad annum 1431 perducta Tomus I editio altera (Monasterii 1913).
- Ficker, Die Regesten des Kaiserreiches ... 1198-1272 second edition (Innsbruck 1882).
- Hughes, Philip, History of the Church: Volume 2: The Church in the World The Church Created: Augustine To Aquinas (London: Sheed & Ward 1979) 397–400.
- Karst, August, Geschichte Manfreds vom Tode Friedrichs II. bis zu seiner Krönung (1250-1258) (Berlin: E. Ebering 1897).
- Larner, John, Italy in the Age of Dante and Petrarch, 1216-1380 (Amsterdam 1980).
- Levi, Guido, "Il Cardinale Ottaviano degli Ubaldini, secondo il suo carteggio ed altri documenti," Archivio della Società Romana di storia patria 14 (1891), 231–303.
- Mann, Horace K., The lives of the popes in the early Middle Ages Volume 14 (1928).
- Manselli, Raoul, "Alessandro IV," Enciclopedia dei Papi (2000) (Treccani-on-line)
- Miller, E., Konradin von Hohenstaufen (Berlin 1897).
- Pagnotti, F., "Niccolò da Calvi e la sua «Vita d' Innocenzo IV»," Archivio della R. Società Romana di storia patria 21 (1898) 7–120.
- Pispisa, Enrico, Il regno di Manfredi. Proposte di interpretazione (Messina 1991).
- Rodenberg, C., Innozenz IV. und das Konigreich Sizilien 1245-1254 (Halle 1892).
- Sibilia, Salvatore, Alessandro IV (1254-1261) (Anagni 1961).
- Tenckhoff, F., Papst Alexander IV. (Paderborn 1907).
- Villani, Giovanni, Cronica di Giovanni Villani (edited by F. G. Dragomani) Vol. 1 (Firenze 1844).
- Willemsen, Carl A., Bibliographie zur Geschichte Kaiser Friedrichs II. und der letzten Staufer (München: Monumenta Germaniae Historica 1986) (Monumenta Germaniae Historica Hilfsmittel, 8).
- Zeller, Georg, König Konrad IV. in Italien 1252-1254 (Bremen: H. Seeman 1907).
- Zöpffel, Richard Otto, Die Papstwahlen und die mit Ihnen im nächsten Zusammenhang stehenden Ceremonien in Entwicklung ihrer vom 11. bis zum 14. Jahrhundert (Göttingen 1870), pp. 119–120.
