= 1268–1271 papal election =

Election of Catholic Pope Gregory X

Papal election 1268–71

Dates and location
- 1 December 1268 – 1 September 1271; Palace of the Popes in Viterbo

Key officials
- Dean: Odo of Châteauroux
- Protopriest: Simone Paltanieri
- Protodeacon: Riccardo Annibaldi

Election
- Ballots: Not less than 137

Elected pope
- Teobaldo Visconti; Name taken: Gregory X
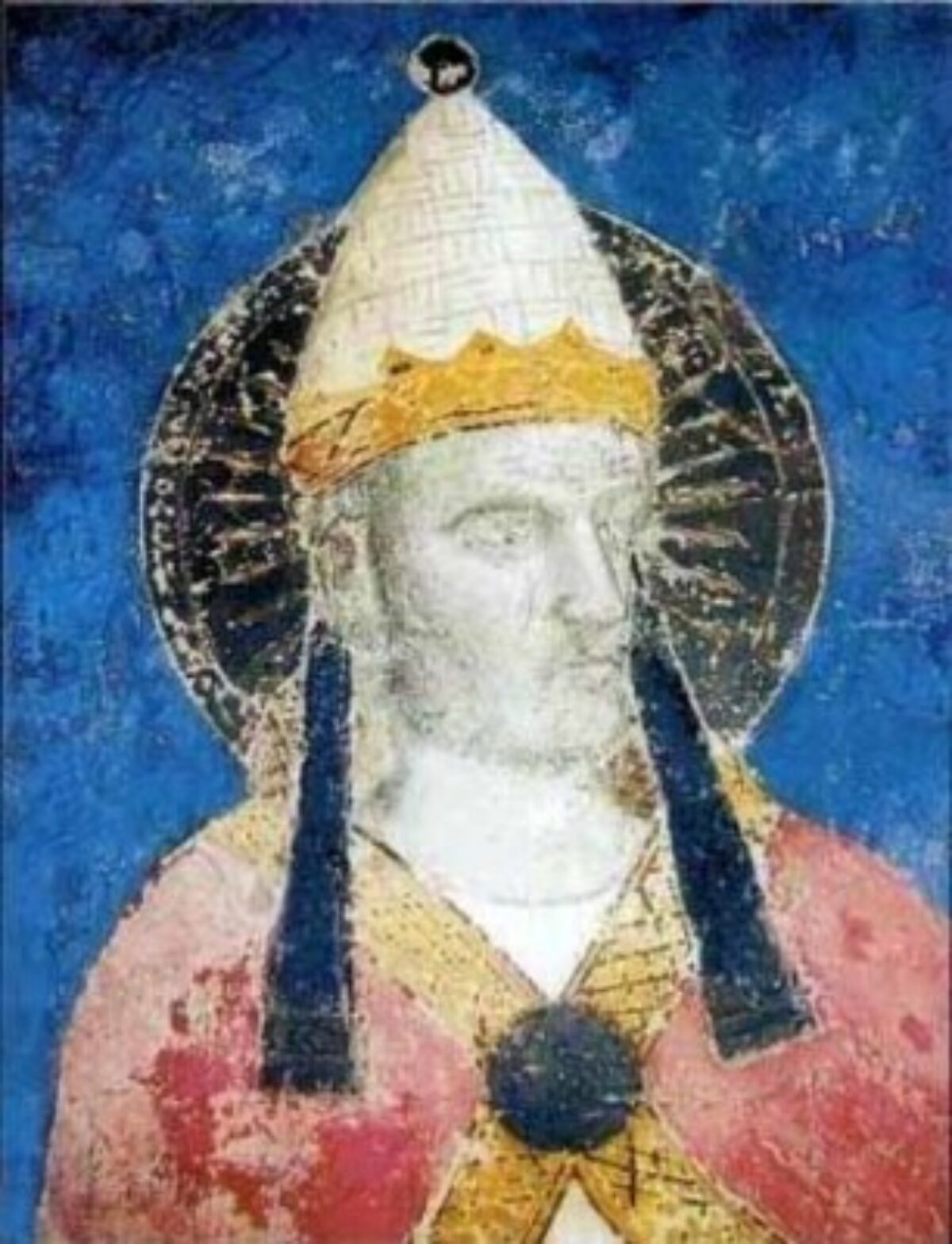

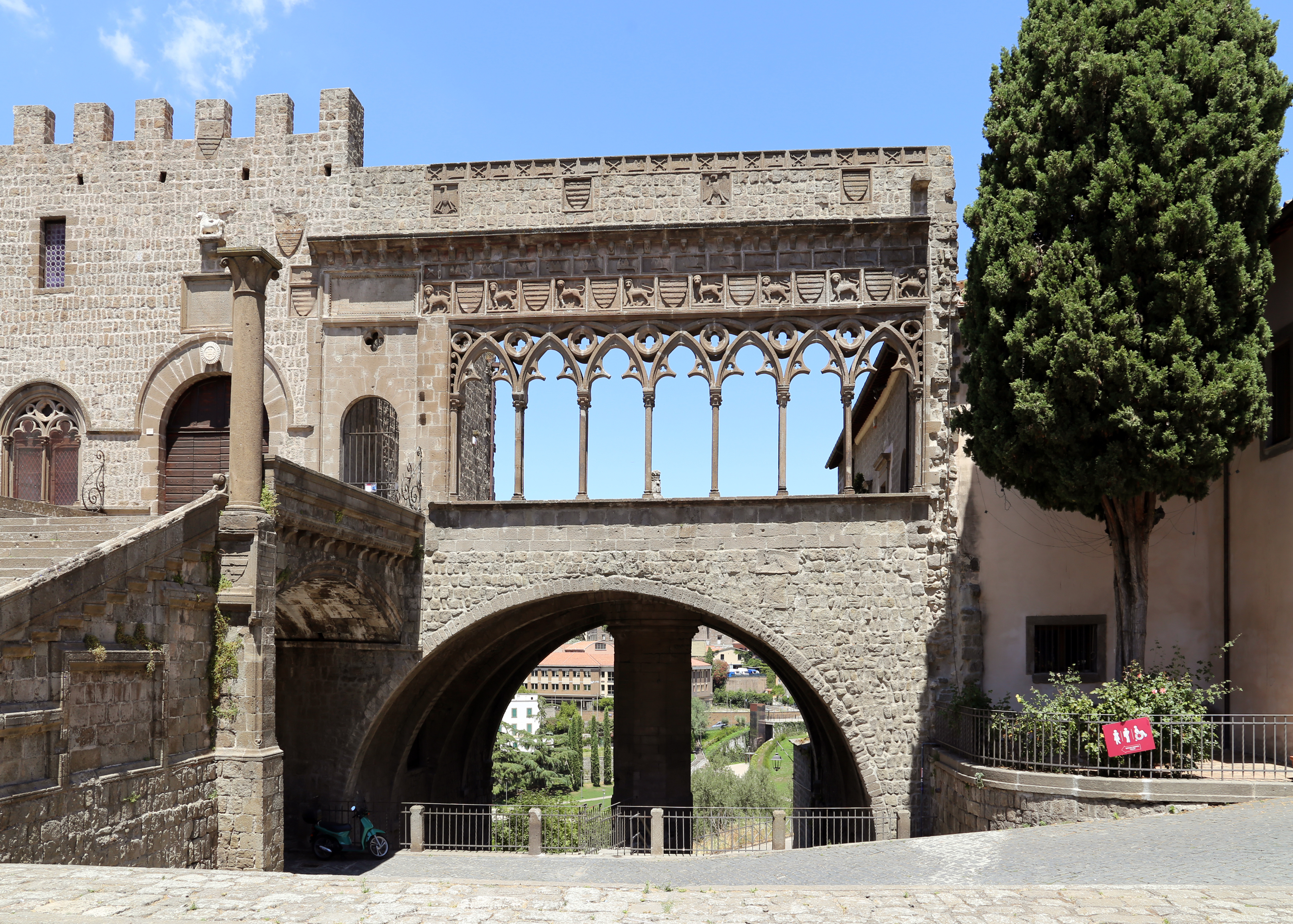
The Palace of the Popes in Viterbo, the roof of which was removed in an attempt to speed up the election

The papal election that followed the death of Pope Clement IV lasted from 1 December 1268 to 1 September 1271 and was the longest in the history of the Catholic Church. This was due primarily to political infighting between the cardinals. The election of Teobaldo Visconti as Pope Gregory X was the first example of a papal election by "compromise", that is, by the appointment of a committee of six cardinals agreed to by the other ten. (This method was attempted once before, in the 1227 papal election, but the choice of the committee refused the honor and the full group of cardinals proceeded to elect the pope.) The election occurred more than a year after the magistrates of Viterbo locked the cardinals in, reduced their rations to bread and water, and removed the roof of the Palace of the Popes in Viterbo where the election took place.

As a result of the length of the election, during which three of the twenty cardinal-electors died and one resigned, Gregory X promulgated the papal bull Ubi periculum on 7 July 1274, during the Second Council of Lyon, establishing the papal conclave, whose rules were based on the tactics employed against the cardinals in Viterbo. The first election held under those rules is sometimes viewed as the first conclave.

== Cardinal electors ==
The dynamic of the conclave was divided between the French Angevin cardinals, mostly created by Pope Urban IV, who were amenable to an invasion of Italy by Charles of Anjou, and the non-French (mostly Italian) cardinals whose numbers were just sufficient to prevent a French pope from being elected. Clement IV's crowning of Charles of Anjou as King of Naples and Sicily, previously a papal fief, had cemented the influence of the French monarchy in the Italian peninsula and created an intense division within the College of Cardinals between those who opposed and supported French influence, and by extension, ultramontanism. Conradin, the last ruler of the House of Hohenstaufen, had been beheaded in Naples just a month before the death of Clement IV.

At the death of Clement IV there were twenty cardinals in the Sacred College. One cardinal (Rodolphe of Albano) was absent throughout and died during the vacancy. The other nineteen cardinals participated in the election in 1269, but two died and another left due to illness before the remaining 16 cardinals settled on a new pope.

Elector	Nationality	Order and title	Elevated	Elevator	Notes
Odo of Châteauroux	French	Cardinal-Bishop of Frascati	28 May 1244	Innocent IV	Dean of the Sacred College of Cardinals
István Báncsa†	Hungarian	Cardinal-Bishop of Palestrina	December 1251	Innocent IV	Died on 9 July 1270, first Hungarian cardinal
John of Toledo, O.Cist.	English	Cardinal-Bishop of Porto e Santa Rufina	28 May 1244	Innocent IV	
Henry of Segusio	Piedmontese (from Susa)	Cardinal-Bishop of Ostia and Velletri	May 1262	Urban IV	Departed on 8 June 1270, later returned
Simone Paltanieri (or Paltinieri, or Paltineri)	Paduan	Cardinal-priest of Ss. Silvestro e Martino ai Monti	17 December 1261	Urban IV	Committee member; Cardinal primoprete
Simon Monpitie de Brie	French	Cardinal-priest of S. Cecilia	17 December 1261	Urban IV	Future Pope Martin IV
Anchero Pantaleone	French	Cardinal-priest of S. Prassede	May 1262	Urban IV	Cardinal-nephew
Guillaume de Bray	French	Cardinal-priest of S. Marco	May 1262	Urban IV	
Guy de Bourgogne, O.Cist.	Burgundian or Castilian	Cardinal-priest of S. Lorenzo in Lucina	May 1262	Urban IV	Committee member
Annibale Annibaldi, O.P.	Roman	Cardinal-priest of Ss. XII Apostoli	May 1262	Urban IV	Treated with Philip III of France and Charles I of Naples
Riccardo Annibaldi	Roman	Cardinal-deacon of S. Angelo in Pescheria	1238	Gregory IX	Committee member Nephew of Pope Alexander IV; Protodeacon
Ottaviano Ubaldini	Florentine	Cardinal-deacon of S. Maria in Via Lata	28 May 1244	Innocent IV	Committee member
Giovanni Gaetano Orsini	Roman	Cardinal-deacon of S. Nicola in Carcere	28 May 1244	Innocent IV	Committee member Future Pope Nicholas III
Ottobono Fieschi dei Conti di Lavagna	Genoese	Cardinal-deacon of S. Adriano	December 1251	Innocent IV	Future Pope Adrian V, Cardinal-nephew
Uberto Coconati	Piedmontese (from Asti)	Cardinal-deacon of S. Eustachio	17 December 1261	Urban IV	
Giacomo Savelli	Roman	Cardinal-deacon of S. Maria in Cosmedin	17 December 1261	Urban IV	Committee member Future Pope Honorius IV
Goffredo da Alatri	Alatri	Cardinal-deacon of S. Giorgio in Velabro	17 December 1261	Urban IV	
Giordano dei Conti Pironti da Terracina†	Terracina	Cardinal-deacon of Ss. Cosma e Damiano	May 1262	Urban IV	Died in October 1269, Vice-chancellor
Matteo Rosso Orsini	Roman	Cardinal-deacon of S. Maria in Portico	May 1262	Urban IV	Nephew of Pope Nicholas III

† denotes a cardinal elector who died during the election.

=== Absent cardinals ===
Elector	Nationality	Order and title	Elevated	Elevator	Notes
Rodolphe de Chevrières† (Raoul Grosparmi)	French	Cardinal-Bishop of Albano	17 December 1261	Urban IV	He accompanied king Louis IX of France in his crusade in Tunisia and died there on 11 August 1270.

== Parties in the College of Cardinals ==
Nationality of Cardinal Electors
Country	Number of Electors
Rome	5
France†	5
Piedmont	2
England, Florence, Genoa, Hungary†, Alatri, Padua, Terracina†, Burgundy or Castilia	1
† one cardinal died before final scrutiny

According to contemporary accounts in the Annales Piacentines the College of Cardinals was divided into adherents of Charles d'Anjou (pars Caroli) and the Imperial party (pars Imperii), but the exact reconstruction of these parties is very difficult. It is almost certain that this account is inaccurate when it claims that pars Caroli had six (or seven, in another place in that account) members, including Giovanni Gaetano Orsini and Ottobono Fieschi, while pars Imperii had eleven (or ten) members, Riccardo Annibaldi, Ottaviano Ubaldini and Uberto Coconati among them. Certainly five cardinals, namely Ottobono Fieschi, Guillame de Bray, Anchero Pantaleone, Simon Monpitie de Brie and Odo of Châteauroux belonged to the Angevin faction. But if Giovanni Gaetano Orsini was really one of their leaders, then his relatives Matteo Orsini Rosso and Giacomo Savelli should also be added here, and since Henry of Segusio is also likely to have belonged to this faction, its true size would have amounted to nine cardinals. The imperial party, on the contrary, could not have had more than ten members, including two who had died during the sede vacante.

According to Sternfeld it is possible to identify not only two, but as many as four parties in the Sacred College, of which two were pars Caroli and pars Imperii in the strict sense, while the remaining two represented the factions inside the Roman aristocracy:

- Angevin party (pars Caroli), that included Ottobono Fieschi, Guillame de Bray, Anchero Pantaleone, Simon Monpitie de Brie, probably Odo of Châteauroux and possibly Henry of Segusio, though the last two certainly represented moderate attitude
- Ghibeline party (pars Imperii), that included John of Toledo, Simone Paltinieri, Ottaviano Ubaldini, Uberto Coconati, and probably also Guy de Castella and two cardinals who had died in the election (Giordano Pironti and István Báncsa)
- Orsini faction - party of Cardinal Giovanni Gaetano Orsini, which included Matteo Orsini Rosso and Giacomo Savelli
- Annibaldi faction - party of Cardinal Riccardo Annibaldi, which included also his relatives Annibale Annibaldi and Goffredo da Alatri

Nevertheless, it seems that these four parties actually formed two blocs in the election: Annibaldi joined pars Imperii, while Orsini aligned himself with pars Caroli.

== Procedure ==
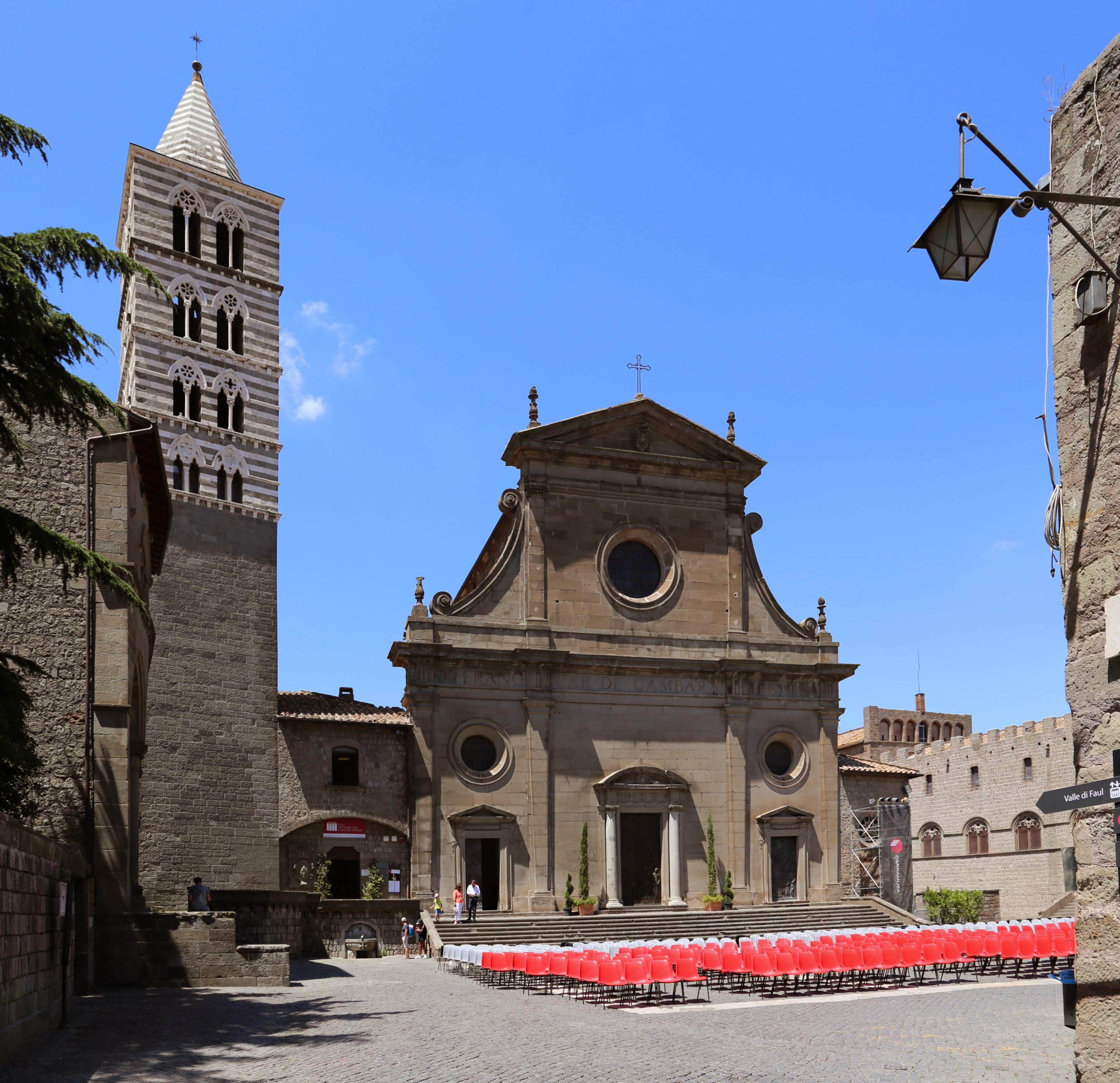
The Duomo di Viterbo, where the election began.

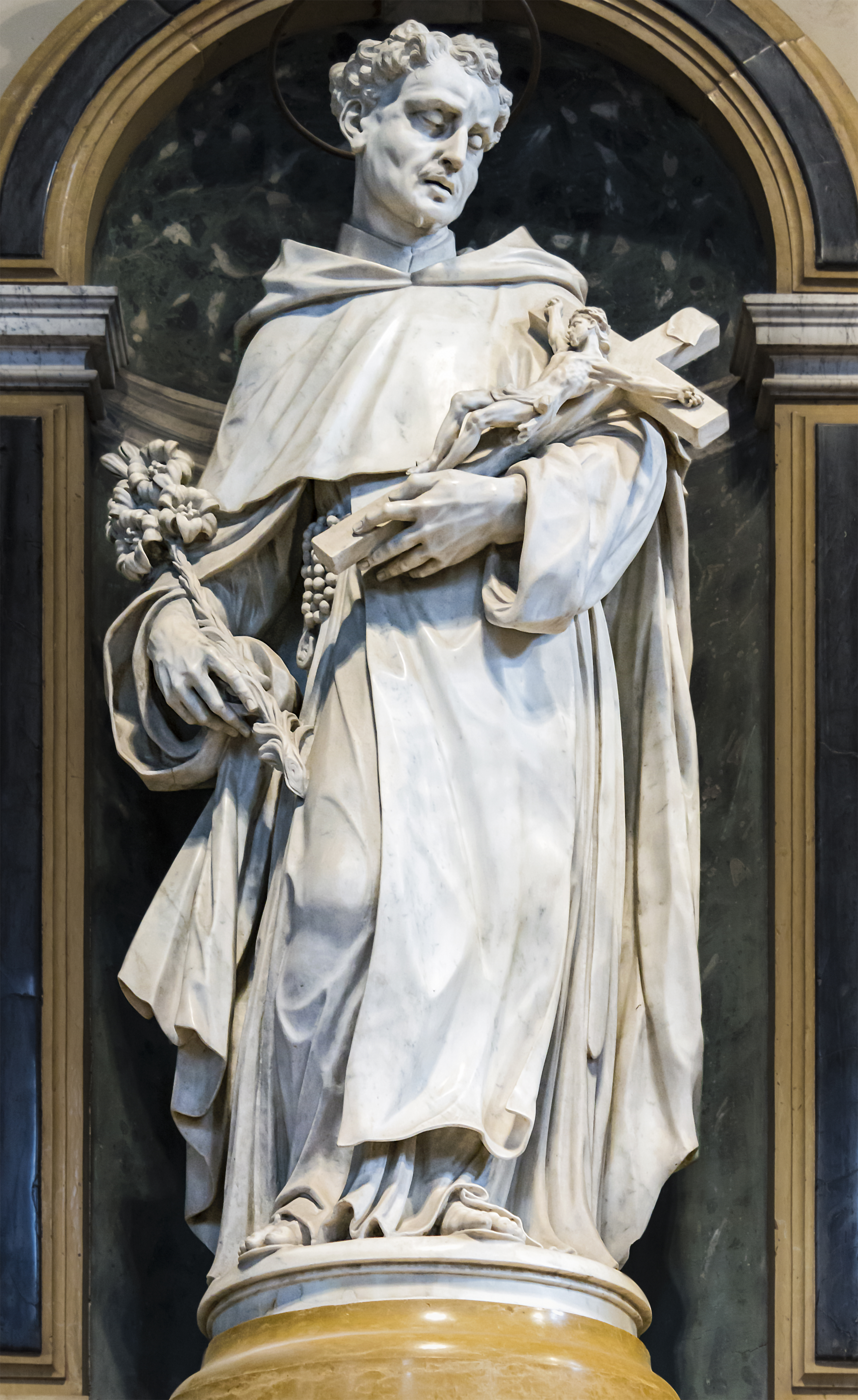
Saint Philip Benizi, who was allegedly nearly elected after two months.

The cardinals began the election by meeting and voting once a day in the Episcopal Palace in Viterbo, before returning to their respective residences; tradition dictated that the election should take place in the city where the previous pope died, if the late pontiff had died outside Rome. Not much reliable data is known about the candidates proposed during almost three years of deliberations; certainly cardinals Odo of Châteauroux, John of Toledo, Giovanni Gaetano Orsini, Ottaviano Ubaldini, Riccardo Annibadi, and Ottobono Fieschi were counted among the papabili.

According to later accounts, not supported by the contemporary sources, after two months, the cardinals nearly elected Philip Benizi, general of the Servite Order, who had come to Viterbo to admonish the cardinals, but fled to prevent his election. Also, the candidature of Saint Bonaventure had allegedly been proposed. Modern scholars treat these accounts with skepticism, considering them as products of invention of the hagiographers of these two saints.

Charles of Anjou was in Viterbo for the entirety of the election; Philip III of France visited the city in March 1271.

In late 1269, after several months of deadlock during which the cardinals had met only intermittently, Ranieri Gatti, the Prefect of Viterbo, and Albertus de Montebono, the Podesta, ordered (some sources say, at the urging of Saint Bonaventure) the cardinals sequestered in the Palace of the Popes in Viterbo until a new pope was elected. On 8 June 1270, the cardinals addressed a Diploma to the two magistrates asking that Henry of Segusio, Cardinal-Bishop of Ostia, be dismissed from the "Palatio discooperto" ("the uncovered Palace") owing to his ill health and his having already renounced his right to vote.

According to the account of Onofrio Panvinio, Cardinal John of Toledo suggested that the roof be removed ("Let us uncover the Room, else the Holy Ghost will never get at us"—the first recorded reference to the notion that the Holy Spirit should guide cardinal electors), which the two magistrates readily obliged. Other sources say it was Charles of Anjou who orchestrated the reduction of the diet of the cardinals to bread and water and the removal of the roof of the Papal Palace. Some sources say that a makeshift roof was reassembled after the cardinals threatened to put the entire city of Viterbo under interdict.

=== The Committee ===
Under pressure from Philip III of France and other rulers, on 1 September 1271, the cardinals agreed to cede their authority to a committee of six. The committee included two cardinals of the faction of Orsini (Giovanni Gaetano Orsini and Giacomo Savelli), three Ghibelines (Simone Paltinieri, Ottaviano Ubaldini and Guy de Castella) and Cardinal Riccardo Annibaldi, while Angevin cardinals seem to have been entirely marginalized.

The committee chose an Italian from Piacenza, Teobaldo Visconti, a non-cardinal, who was then in Acre with the retinue of Edward (the eldest-son of Henry III of England) as papal legate to the Ninth Crusade. Informed of his election, Visconti departed on 19 November 1271 and reached Viterbo on 12 February 1272, where he took the name Gregory X. He entered Rome on 13 March 1272 and was ordained a priest on 19 March 1272. He was consecrated a bishop and crowned on 27 March 1272 in St. Peter's Basilica. During the final leg of his journey, from Brindisi on 11 January 1272, Visconti was accompanied by Charles of Anjou.

== Legacy ==
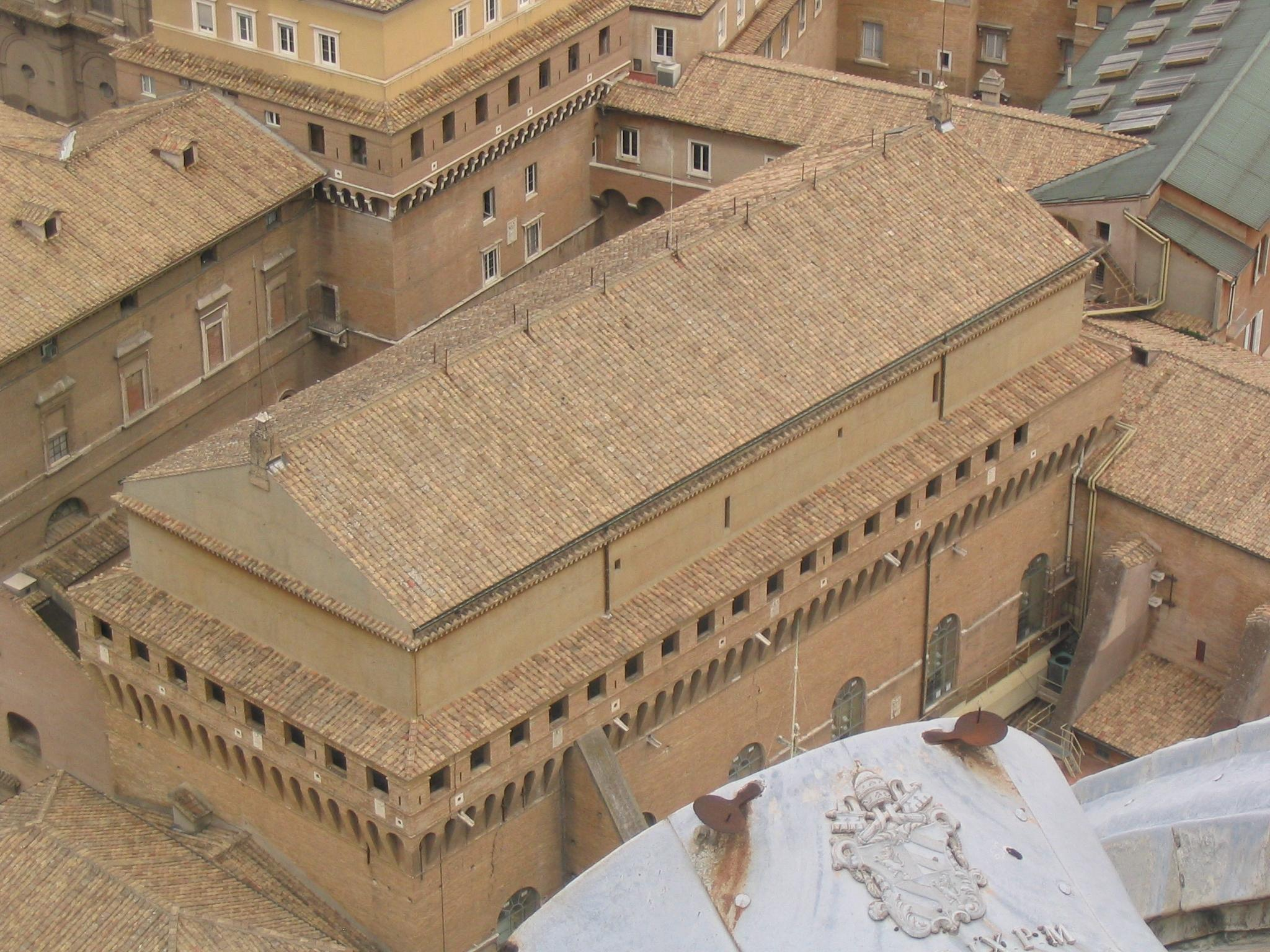
The ad hoc tactics employed against the dilatory cardinals at Viterbo were the inspiration for the rules of the papal conclave.

The techniques employed against the dilatory cardinals in Viterbo formed the basis for the canon law of papal conclaves as laid out in the papal bull Ubi periculum of Pope Gregory X, promulgated during the Second Council of Lyon on 7 July 1274. Popular accounts of the conclave, as early as those of French historian Georges Goyau, neglect to mention the political intrigue of Charles I of Naples or his nephew, Philip III of France, as the masterminds of the hardships employed by the "citizens of Viterbo".

Designed both to accelerate future elections and reduce outside interference, the rules of Ubi periculum provide for the cardinal electors to be secluded for the entirety of the conclave, including having their meals passed through a small opening, and for their rations to be reduced to a single meal at the end of three days, or bread and water (with a little wine) after eight days. Cardinals also do not collect from the Apostolic Camera any payments they might otherwise receive during the conclave.

The stringent rules of Ubi periculum were used in the conclaves that elected Pope Innocent V (January 1276) and Pope Adrian V (July 1276), lasting one and nine days respectively. At the urging of the College, however, the newly elected Adrian V suspended those rules on 12 July 1276—indicating that he wished to revise it—but then died on 18 August without having promulgated a revised version.

Therefore, the election of Pope John XXI (August–September 1276) did not follow Ubi periculum, and John XXI promulgated another bull, Licet felicis recordationis, formally revoking Ubi periculum. The next five papal elections—1277 (Pope Nicholas III), 1280-1281 (Pope Martin IV), 1285 (Pope Honorius IV), 1287-1288 (Pope Nicholas IV), and 1292-1294 (Pope Celestine V)—occurred sans conclave, often at great length. Celestine V, whose election took two years and three months, reinstated the conclave with a series of three decrees, and his successor, Pope Boniface VIII, restored the conclave by his "Regulae Iuris".

== Bibliography ==
- Francesco Cristofori, Il conclave del MCCLXX in Viterbo (Roma-Siena-Viterbo 1888).
- Antonio Franchi, Il conclave di Viterbo (1268-1271) e le sue origini: saggio con documenti inediti (Assisi: Porziuncola, 1993).
- Andreas Fischer, Kardinäle im Konklave: die lange Sedisvakantz der Jahre 1268 bis 1271 (Berlin: Walter de Gruyter 2008),
