= Jean Chapeauville =

Theologian and vicar general in the Prince-Bishopric of Liège

Jean Chapeauville (January 5, 1551 – May 11, 1617) was a theologian, historian and vicar general in the Prince-Bishopric of Liège.

== Life ==
Born in Liège, capital of the Prince-Bishopric of Liège, Chapeauville made his philosophical studies at the University of Cologne and University of Louvain, and at the latter received the degree of Licentiate of Theology. He then entered the priesthood, and in 1578 was appointed one of the synodal examiners for the Roman Catholic Diocese of Liège, and in 1579 parish priest of St. Michael's in Liège. He performed the functions of the latter office for about ten years.

Having been a canon of the collegiate church of St. Peter's in Liège since 1582, Chapeauville was elevated in 1599 to the dignity of a provost of the same church. In 1587, Pope Sixtus V appointed him the first penitentiary canon of Saint Lambert's Cathedral, Liège. On 12 June 1600, he was promoted to archdeacon of Famenne.

Meanwhile, in 1582, Chapeauville had been nominated Inquisitor of the Faith, and in 1598, Ernest of Bavaria, Prince-Bishop of Liège, appointed him vicar general, in which office he was retained, despite his protests, by Bishop Ernest's successor, Ferdinand of Bavaria.

Chapeauville taught theology with great success in several monasteries of the Diocese of Liège and published works on theological subjects. He endeavoured to enforce in the diocese the reforms decided upon by the Council of Trent, particularly the establishment of the Diocesan Seminary of Liège and the concursus for the nomination of parish priests.

Chapeauville died in 1617, in the city of his birth.

== Works ==
He published a collection of the chief works on the history of the bishops of Liège, and wrote an account of the episcopate of Liège, commencing with Érard de La Marck (1506) and ending with the year 1613. His principal works are:

- Tractatus de necessitate et modo administrandi sacramenta tempore pestis (Liège, 1586)
- Petit traite des vices et des vertus (Liège, 1594)
- Abbrege de la somme des péchez M. J. Benedicti (Liège, 1595)
- De casibus reservatis tractatus (Liège, 1596)
- Catechismi Romani elucidatio scholastica (Liège, 1600)
- Historia admirandarum curationum quae divinitus ope deprecationeque divi Perpetui Leodiensis episcopi contigerunt. Adjecta est vita B. Perpetui (Liège, 1601; French translation, 1601)
- Summa catechismi Romani (Liège, 1605)
- Epistola ad catechistas de taedio quod catechistis obrepere solet (Liège, 1605)
- Catechista, sive brevis tractatus de necessitate et modo administrandi doctrinam christianam (Liège, 1608)
- Qui gesta pontificum tungrensium, trajectensium et leodiensium scripserunt auctores praecipui (3 vols., Liège, 1612, 1613, 1616)
