= Gil Torres =

Gil Torres may refer to:

- Gil Torres (cardinal) (d. 1254), Spanish cleric
- Gil Torres (baseball player) (1915–1983), Cuban athlete
