= Simone Paltanieri =

Italian Roman Catholic cardinal

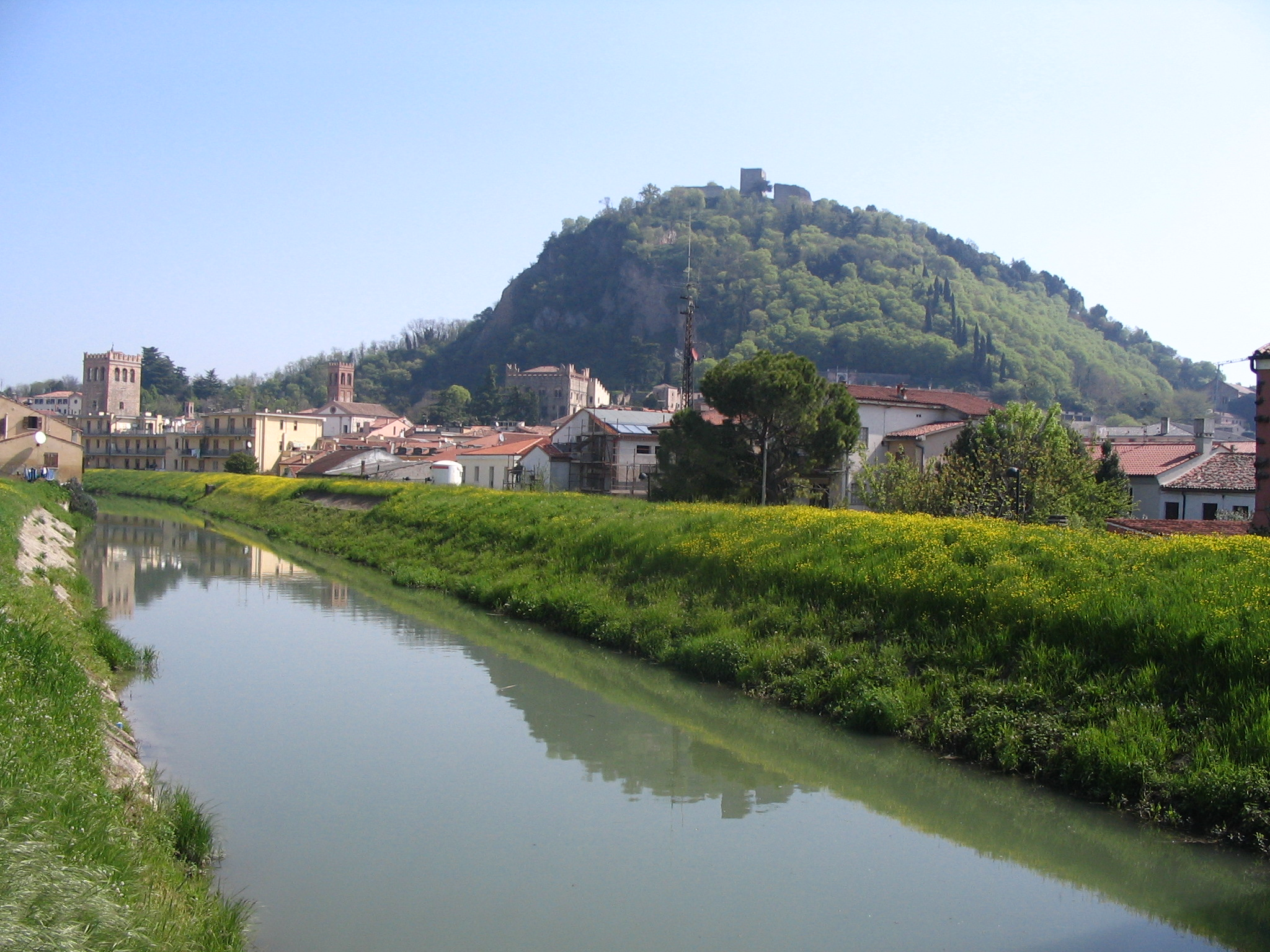
Monselice, the fortress

Simone Paltanieri (or Paltinieri, or Paltineri, or Paltaneri), son of Pesce Paltanieri, member of a distinguished family (born in Monselice in the Veneto, some 20 km. from Padua, ca. 1200; died in Viterbo in February, 1277), was an Italian Roman Catholic cardinal.

== Education and early career ==
He held the title of Magister (Master), which indicates he had graduate training in a university. It is said that he was Master of Canon Law, and that the university from which he acquired his degree was (not unreasonably) Padua.

He was named Canon in the Cathedral of Padua in 1233, and held the post for life. He became a citizen of Padua.

In 1234 (or 1231), Simon Paltanieri was named Archpriest of the Abbey of S. Giustina in Monselice, a dependency of S. Giustina in Padua, a post he held until 1258.

== Administrator of Aversa ==
On 17 November 1254, Master Simone, Canon of Padua and Procurator of the Church of Aversa, was named Administrator of the Church of Aversa by Pope Innocent IV. He was already Procurator, which meant that the Church of Aversa had employed him to manage its business in the Roman Curia. The reason for Simone's appointment as Administrator of Aversa, a town just north of Naples, is not far to seek. Innocent IV, in his obsessive policy of destroying the Hohenstaufen, a policy inherited from his predecessor Gregory IX, had negotiated an understanding with Manfred, son of Frederick II "the Great", and brother of Conrad IV von Hohenstaufen. The apparent understanding was embodied in a treaty of September 1254, in which the Pope acquired possession of Apulia. But Manfred's suspicions were justifiably aroused against the Pope and his advisers by their behavior as the Roman Curia was traveling from Anagni to Capua. He had built a papal army, led by Cardinal Guglielmo Fieschi, his nephew, and began moving south against Manfred in October 1254. The papal army reached Teano on 16 October, causing Manfred to flee for his life. During these two months, Innocent was eager to acquire as much local support as possible, including that of the barons of Aversa. On 23 October 1254, for example, Innocent, who was at Capua at the time, detached Amalfi from their traditional obedience to the Kings of Sicily and received them directly into his own power. The papal army was soundly defeated at the Battle of Foggia, which took place on 2 December 1254, days before the death of Innocent himself, in Naples, on Monday 7 December. The new pope, Alexander IV, raised another army against Manfred, led by Cardinal Ottaviano degli Ubaldini as Legate in the Kingdom of Sicily. It is conjectured that Paltanieri was his Vicar. The second papal army was crushed by Manfred in 1257.

== Cardinal ==
Simone Paltanieri was created cardinal priest by Pope Urban IV (Jacques Pantaleone) on 17 December 1261, and eventually assigned the titular Church of SS. Silvester and Martin in Rome. At the time of his creation he had not yet received sacramental ordination as a priest, and complaints were made to the Pope that he should not be allowed to function as a cardinal until that defect had been made good. Pope Urban agreed that he should not use cardinalatial insignia or participate in Consistory until he had been ordained. Then charges were laid against Simone's character, which the Pope felt compelled to acknowledge for their seriousness, and an investigation was therefore ordered into their trustworthiness. To be sure, the anonymous Monk of Padua gave Simone a rousing endorsement: "Lord Simone de Montescillice, Canon of Padua, is very blessed, as much as in the appearance of his body and the nobility of his ancestry as the gentility of his mores and his manyfold knowledge." But it was not until 26 June 1262, that Cardinal Simone subscribed his first papal document. As a cardinal, Paltanieri was a member of the Ghibbeline faction in the Sacred College.

== Provincial governor ==
On 20 May 1264, Cardinal Simone was appointed Rector of the Duchy of Spoleto, the Marches of Ancona and Massa Trabaria, Perugia, Civita Castellana, Tudertina, Narni, Interamna and Reate, as well as the Patriarchates of Aquileia, Gradensis and Ravenna by Pope Urban IV. Pope Urban died on 2 October 1264. Cardinal Simone did not participate in the papal election of 8 October 1264 in Perugia, though he was surely present for the ratification of the election upon the arrival of the pope-elect, Guy Foulques, on 5 February 1265.

== Conclaves ==
Cardinal Simone Paltanieri participated in the long Election of 1268–1271, and was one of the six cardinals elected on 1 September 1271, to a Committee of Compromise, charged with selecting a pope from inside or outside the College of Cardinals, provided that five of the six cardinals were in agreement. Archdeacon Teobaldo Visconti of Liège, a native of Piacenza and nephew of Otto Visconti, Archbishop of Milan, was chosen. Visconti's nephew, Vicedomino de' Vicedomini, a native of Piacenza, Archbishop of Aix, was a follower and advisor of the Angevin King Charles I of Naples, brother of Louis IX of France.

In 1274 Cardinal Simone travelled to France and was present at the opening session of the Second Council of Lyon, under the presidency of Pope Gregory X. His return journey to Italy seems to have followed a different path from that of the Pope and six cardinals who accompanied him. Cardinal Simone was not present at Arezzo on 10 January 1276, when Pope Gregory X died without having completed his return journey to Rome. Cardinal Simone was present, however, in time to take part in the Conclave of 20–21 January 1276, which elected Cardinal Pierre de Tarantaise as Pope Innocent V on the first ballot. Cardinal Simone was also one of a dozen or thirteen cardinals who participated in the Second Conclave of 1276, which began on 2 July, and resulted in the election of Cardinal Ottobono Fieschi of Genoa on 11 July. Cardinal Ottobono took the name Adrian V, and in his first Consistory, the day of or the day after his election, he suspended the papal Bull, "Ubi Periculum" of Pope Gregory X, which governed the operation of papal conclaves. He and the Papal Curia then immediately left Rome to get away from the summer heat. Unfortunately Adrian died in Viterbo only thirty-eight days into his reign, never having been ordained priest, consecrated bishop, or crowned Pope.

The Conclave to elect a successor to Pope Adrian should have begun on 28 or 29 August but the rules that dictated such a date ("Ubi Periculum") had been suspended. In any case, it is known that disorders in the city of Viterbo, caused by members of the Roman Curia and the People, brought about a delay. Ten cardinals selected one of their body, Cardinal Peter Juliani of Lisbon, as the new pope. He chose to call himself John XXI (the credulous inclusion of 'Pope Joan' in the papal numbering confused the correct enumeration; Peter was only the 20th Pope John), and was crowned at Viterbo on 20 September 1276 by Cardinal Giovanni Gaetano Orsini.

== Death ==
Cardinal Simone Paltanieri died in Viterbo between 7 and 12 February 1277.

== Bibliography ==
- Giuseppe di Cesare, Storia di Manfredi. re di Sicilia e di Puglia I (Napoli: Raffaele di Stefano 1837).
- Augustinus Theiner (Editor), Caesaris S. R. E. Cardinalis Baronii, Od. Raynaldi et Jac. Laderchii Annales Ecclesiastici Tomus Vigesimus Primus 1229–1256 (Barri-Ducis: Ludovicus Guerin 1870) [Baronius-Theiner].
- Bartholomaeus Capasso, Historia diplomatica Regni Siciliae inde ab anno 1250 ad annum 1266 (Neapoli 1874).
- E. Jordan, "Les promotions de cardinaux sous Urbain IV," Revue d' histoire et de littérature religieuses 5 (1900) 322–334.
- Ferdinand Gregorovius, History of the City of Rome in the Middle Ages, Volume V, second edition, revised (London: George Bell, 1906).
- Angelo Main, "Il cardinale di Monselice Simone Paltanieri, nella storia del secolo XIII," Nuovo Archivio veneto 39 (1920), 65–141.
- Agostino Paravicini Bagliani, I Testamenti dei Cardinali del Duecento (Roma: Presso la Società alla Biblioteca Vallicelliana, 1980).
- E. Pispisa, Il regno di Manfredi. Proposte di interpretazione (Messina 1991).
- Giorgio Zacchello, "Il cardinale Simone Paltanieri. Breve profilo biografico," Monselice, Storia, cultura e arte di un centro 'minore' del Veneto (ed. Antonio Rigon) (Monselice 1994), 625–631.
- Antonio Franchi, Il conclave di Viterbo (1268–1271) e le sue origini: saggio con documenti inediti (Assisi: Porziuncola, 1993).
- Gary M. Radke, Viterbo: Profile of a Thirteenth-century Papal Palace (Cambridge University Press 1996).
- Andreas Fischer, Kardinale im Konklave. Die lange Sedisvakanz der Jahre 1268 bis 1271 (Stuttgart: W. de Gruyter-Max Niemeyer 2008) [Bibliothek des Deutschen Historischen Instituts in Rome, 118].
