= Extractiones de Talmud =

Translated passages of the Babylonian Talmud

A page from a 13th-century copy of the Extractiones

The Extractiones de Talmud is a collection of passages from the Babylonian Talmud translated from Hebrew and Aramaic into Latin in 1244–1245. It is the earliest substantial translation of any part of the Talmud into Latin and the largest collection of Latin Talmudic excerpts.

Around 1238, Nicholas Donin, a Jewish convert to Christianity, first translated some excerpts as part of his 35 criticisms of the Talmud that he submitted to Pope Gregory IX in 1239. One result of this effort was the Disputation of Paris (1240), after which the Talmud was condemned and thousands of copies ultimately burned (1242). Pope Innocent IV, who came to the throne in 1243, initiated a review of the case against the Talmud. Commissioned by Odo of Châteauroux, the Dominicans of the convent of Saint-Jacques in Paris began a partial translation of the Talmud (among other Jewish writings).

The resulting Extractiones de Talmud, completed in 1245, contains 1,922 excerpts. There are two surviving versions with different arrangements of the excerpts. The "sequential" version arranges the excerpts in the same order in which they appear in the Talmud. The "thematic" version arranges them by subject under polemical rubrics. There are separate prologues for each version. There are a total of ten manuscript copies of the Extractiones. The most important copy is Paris, Bibliothèque nationale de France, MS lat. 16558 from the 13th century.

The Extractiones contains much more of the Talmud than either Donin's short work or the Pugio fidei of Ramon Martí, which also contains independently translated excerpts.

== Editions ==
- Cecini, Ulisse; Cruz Palma, Óscar Luis de la, eds. (2018). Extractiones de Talmud per ordinem sequentialem. Corpus Christianorum Continuatio Mediaevalis 291. Brepols.

== Bibliography ==
- Fidora, Alexander (2014). "The Latin Talmud and Its Influence on Christian–Jewish Polemic". Journal of Transcultural Medieval Studies. 1 (2): 337–342. doi:10.1515/jtms-2014-0030. S2CID 147021902.
- Fidora, Alexander (2015). "The Latin Talmud and Its Translators: Nicholas Donin vs. Thibaud de Sézanne?" (PDF). Henoch. 37 (1): 17–28.
- Dal Bo, Federico. "A Priest's "Uncircumcised Heart." Some Theological-Political Remarks on a Rashi's Gloss in tractate Sanhedrin and its Latin translation in Extractiones de Talmud". U.Cecini – E. Vernet i Pons (Eds), Studies on the Latin Talmud, Bellaterra: Universitat Autònoma de Barcelona, 2017: 129–144.
- Dal Bo, Federico (2018). "Talmudic Angelology and the Tosafists: On Metatron in the Latin Translation of Tractates Sanhedrin and Avodah Zarah". Jewish Studies Quarterly. 25 (2): 42–61.
- Dal Bo, Federico (2018). "Hebrew and Aramaic Terms in the 'Extractiones de Talmud.' Some Remarks on a Thirteenth-Century Latin Translation of the Talmud". Journal of Transcultural Medieval Studies. 5 (2): 241–260.
- Dal Bo, Federico (2018). "Jesus' Punishment in Hell in the Latin Translation of the Babylonian Talmud. A Passage from Tractate Gittin in the Extractiones de Talmud". Henoch. 40 (1): 165–195.
- Dal Bo, Federico (2018). "Jesus' Trial In The Latin Talmud. Tractate Sanhedrin and its Translation in the Extractiones de Talmud". Henoch. 41 (1): 140–176.
- Dal Bo, Federico (2018). "Inicium Creationis Iesu Nazareni.' Toledot Yeshu in the Thematic Version of the Extractiones de Talmud". Henoch. 40 (1): 206–222.
- Fidora, Alexander; Hasselhoff, Görge, eds. (2019). The Talmud in Dispute During the High Middle Ages. Servei de Publicacions de la Universitat Autònoma de Barcelona.
- Dal Bo, Federico. "Textualizing, De-Textualizing, and Re-Textualizing the Talmud. The Dimension of Text in the Extractiones de Talmud,". A. Fidora – G.K. Hasselhoff (eds.), The Talmud in Dispute During the High Middle Ages, Bellaterra, Servei de Publicacions de la UAB, 2019: 101–124.
- Resnick, Irven M. (2020). "Review of Cecini & Cruz Palma 2018". Revista Española de Filosofía Medieval. 27 (2): 184–191. doi:10.21071/refime.v27i2.13132. hdl:10396/23869. S2CID 234389249.
