= Odo of Châteauroux =

French theologian and scholastic philosopher

His Eminence Odo of Châteauroux
- Dean of the College of Cardinals
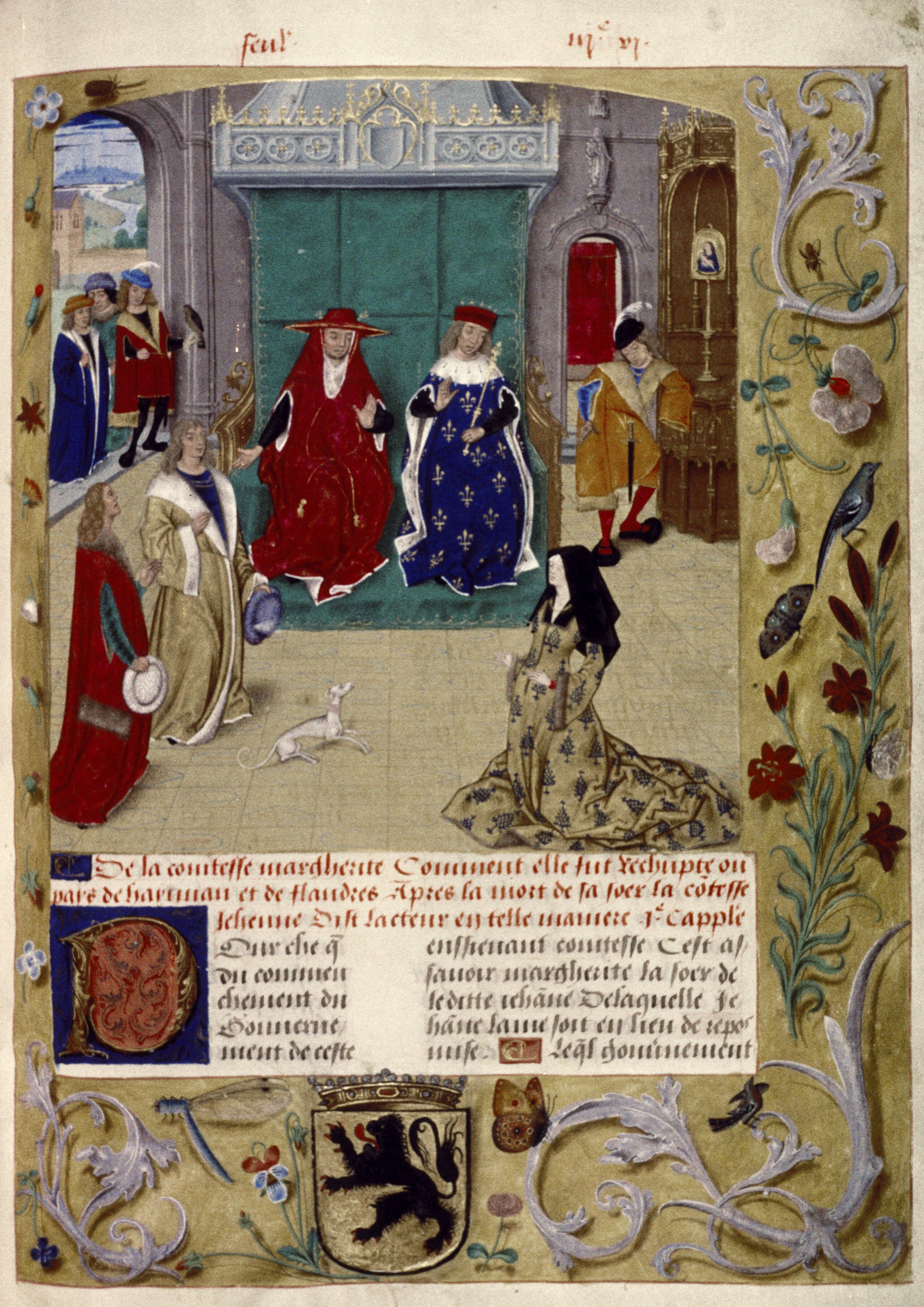
- Margaret of Flanders and her two sons plead their respective causes before Louis IX of France and Odo of Châteauroux, Annales de Hainaut, by Jacques de Guyse, 14th century
- Church: Catholic Church
- Appointed: 12 December 1254
- Term ended: 25 January 1273
- Predecessor: Rinaldo di Jenne
- Successor: John of Toledo
- Other posts: Cardinal-Bishop of Frascati (1244-1273); Camerlengo of the Holy Roman Church (1270-1273)

Orders
- Consecration: 1244
- Created cardinal: 28 May 1244 by Pope Innocent IV
- Rank: Cardinal-Bishop

Personal details
- Born: c. 1190 Châteauroux, France
- Died: 25 January 1273 (aged 82–83) Orvieto, Italy

Odo or Eudes of Châteauroux (c. 1190 –25 January 1273), also known as Odo of Tusculum and by many other names, (Note: Including Odon de Tusculum, Otho of Tusculum, Otho de Tusculum, Odon de Châteauroux, Eudes de Châteauroux, Odo de Castroradulpho, Odo de Castro Radulphi, Odo Gallus, Ottone de Castro Rodolfi, Oddone di Castro Radulfi, Ottone de Castel Ridolfi, and Ottone di Tuscolo.) was a French theologian and scholastic philosopher, papal legate and cardinal. He was “an experienced preacher and promoter of crusades”. Over 1000 of his sermons survive.

== Life ==
Odo was born at Châteauroux around the year 1190.

He preached crusade in 1226. He was chancellor of the University of Paris 1238-1244, and perhaps also Cistercian abbot of Ourscamp, and then abbot of Grandselve. Odo of Ourscamp is a different figure, of the twelfth century. However, several sources deny, doubt or ignore that he was a monk.

He was involved in the aftermath of the Paris disputation of 1240, and subsequent condemnation of the Talmud. After the disputation a tribunal was appointed to pass judgment upon the Talmud, among its members being Eudes de Chateauroux, Chancellor of the University of Paris; Guillaume d'Auvergne, Bishop of Paris; and the Inquisitor Henri de Cologne. After the same rabbis had been heard a second time, the Talmud was condemned to be burned. Two years after (in the middle of 1242) twenty-four cartloads of Hebrew books were burned at Paris. In 1244/1245, Odo commissioned the Extractiones de Talmud, a translation of almost two thousand excerpts from the Talmud into Latin.

In 1247, the pope asked Odo to examine the Talmud from the Jewish standpoint, and to ascertain whether it might not be tolerated as harmless to the Christian faith, and whether the copies which had been confiscated might not be returned to their owners. The rabbis had represented to him that without the aid of the Talmud they could not understand the Bible or the rest of their statutes. Eudes informed the pope that the change of attitude involved in such a decision would be wrongly interpreted, and on 15 May 1248, the Talmud was condemned for the second time. A long list of supposed "errors and blasphemies" contained the Talmud was compiled by Eudes de Chateauroux. He was made cardinal-bishop of Frascati (1244). He is given also as bishop of Toulouse and bishop of Maguelonne and legate, and was sent to preach crusade in France by Pope Innocent IV. He accompanied Louis IX of France on the Seventh Crusade, and is mentioned by Joinville, returning in 1254, via Cyprus. Dean of the Sacred College of Cardinals from December 1254 and Camerlengo of the Holy Roman Church in 1270.

He brought back relics, which he gave to Viterbo, Tournai and Neuvy-Saint-Sépulcre, Indre, France. He also consecrated relics in the Sainte-Chapelle. He led the enquiry into the canonization of Richard of Chichester. In 1270, on the death of Louis IX, he announced official mourning for the whole of Christendom.

He died on 25 January 1273 at Orvieto.

== Works ==
- Super Psalterium
- MLXXVII Sermones de tempore et de sanctis et de diversis casibus

== Notes ==
Catholic Church titles
| Preceded by Jacques de Vitry | Bishop of Frascati; 1244–1273 | Succeeded by João Pedro Julião |
