= Palace of the Popes in Viterbo =

Palace in Viterbo, Lazio, Italy

Coordinates: 42°24′57″N 12°06′03″E

- Palazzo dei Papi
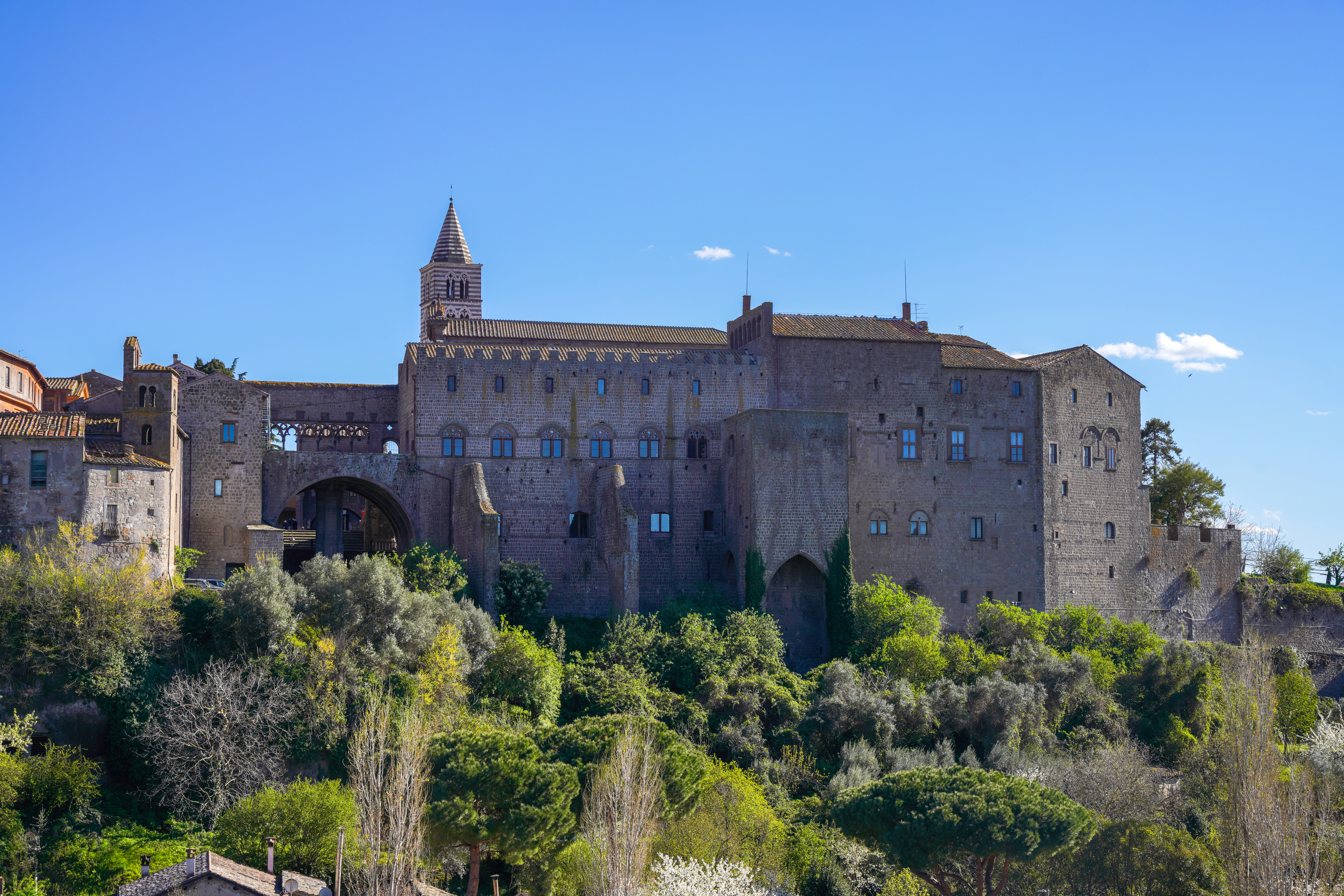
- The Papal Palace of Viterbo, with the bell tower of the cathedral in the background

- Location within Lazio Palace of the Popes in Viterbo (Italy)

General information
- Location: Viterbo, Lazio, Italy
- Completed: 1257

Palace of the Popes in Viterbo (Italian: Palazzo dei Papi) is a palace in Viterbo, region of Lazio, Italy. It is considered to be one of the most important monuments in the city, situated alongside the Duomo di Viterbo (Viterbo Cathedral). The Papal Curia was moved to Viterbo in 1257 by Alexander IV, due to the hostility of the Roman commune and constant urban violence: the former bishop's palace of Viterbo was enlarged to provide the Popes with an adequate residence. The construction, commissioned by the Capitano del popolo ("Captain of the People") Raniero Gatti, provided a great audience hall communicating with a loggia raised on a barrel vault above the city street. It was completed probably around 1266.

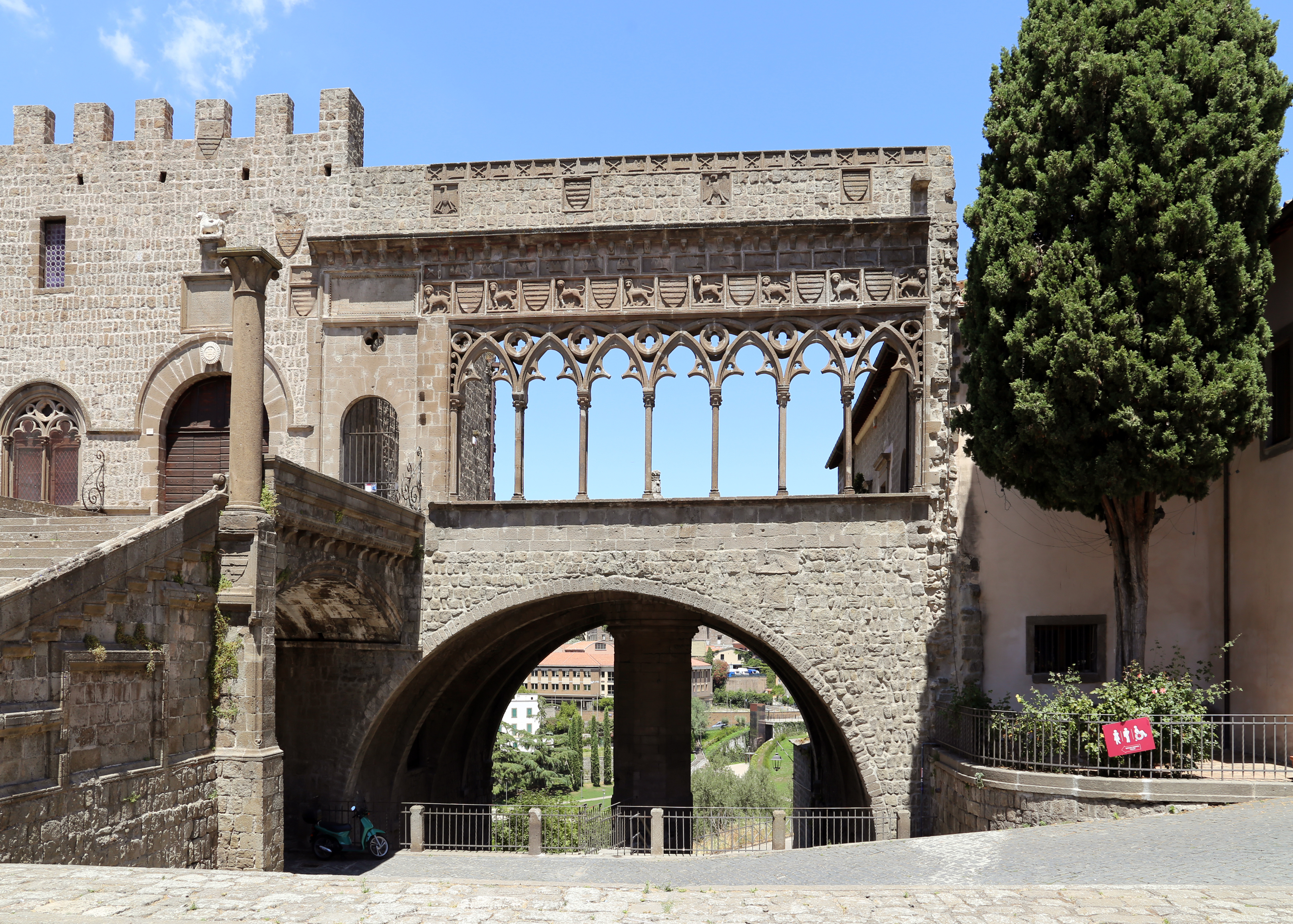
A detail of the Loggia of the Papal Palace of Viterbo.

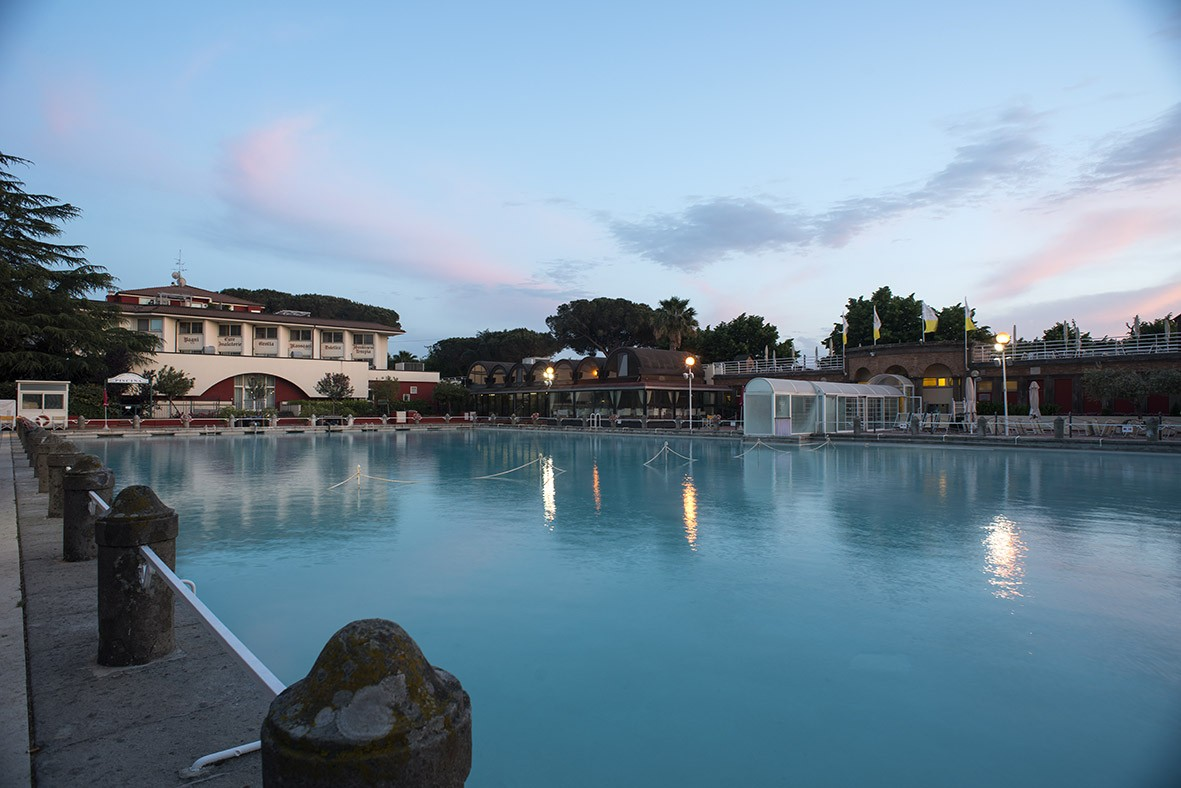
Bagno del Papa in Viterbo.

The massive façade, facing the central piazza San Lorenzo which is dominated by the Duomo, is approached by a wide staircase completed in 1267. The top of the palace walls is decorated with square merlons. On the right is a wide roofless loggia with a seven-bay arcade, supported by slender doubled columns and decorated with crests and reliefs. Within the loggia is a 15th-century fountain, made with material of various ages, sporting the coat of arms of the Gatti family.

Viterbo remained the residence of the papacy for twenty-four years, from 1257 to 1281. After Alexander IV, the palace was the residence of Urban IV, then housed the papal election of 1268–1271 which elected Gregory X (the longest papal election in Church history, which ended after the palace's roof was removed), the residence of John XXI (who died in the building in 1277 when his study collapsed), and the residence again of Nicholas III and Martin IV, who moved almost immediately to Orvieto in 1281. They were all elected in the most famous hall of the palace, the Sala del Conclave so called because it was home to the first and longest conclave in history.

In c. 1454 Pope Nicholas V commissioned building a bath palace in Viterbo, and the construction at the Bagno del Papa was continued on through the reigns of several popes after Nicholas V. The Vatican accounts mention payments "for building done at the bath palace of Viterbo" during the reigns of Calixtus III, Paul II, and Sixtus IV. There also is evidence Pope Pius II was responsible for the addition of a western wing to the building.

== Popes resident in Viterbo ==
- Alexander IV, pope from 1254 to 1261 (stably resident at Viterbo from 1257);
- Urban IV, pope from 1261 to 1264 (divided his residence between Orvieto and Viterbo);
- Clement IV, pope from 1265 to 1268 (resided almost always at Viterbo);
- Gregory X, pope from 1271 to 1276 (Gregory X remained in Viterbo little more than a month, between February and March 1272);
- Innocent V, pope from 21 January to 22 June 1276 (stayed at Viterbo for two weeks, just after his election, and there he met Charles of Anjou);
- Adrian V, pope from 11 July 1276 to 18 August 1276 (spent almost the whole of his short pontificate in the convent next to the church of San Francesco alla Rocca);
- John XXI, pope from 15 September 1276 to 20 May 1277 (resided almost always at Viterbo);
- Nicholas III, pope from 1277 to 1280 (divided his residence between Viterbo, Rome and Soriano nel Cimino);
- Martin IV, elected on 22 February 1281 (abandoned Viterbo immediately after his election).

Martin IV, born Simon de Brion, was the last pope of the “Viterbo period”. He was elected after a turbulent conclave which lasted six months. The civic head of the city, Annibaldo Annibaldi, a supporter of the Angevin faction, had interfered in the conclave, preventing the Cardinal Protodeacon, Matteo Rubeo Orsini, from taking part and entering the conclave by force of arms to arrest two cardinals. As a result, Martin IV was to issue a decree which ordered the abandonment of Viterbo as a papal residence. From then onwards Viterbo was never again a long-term papal residence. Moreover, given the hostility of the Roman populace to a French pope, Martin chose to be crowned in Orvieto.

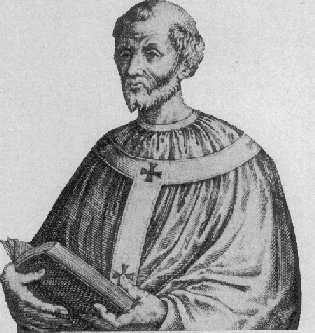
Alexander IV

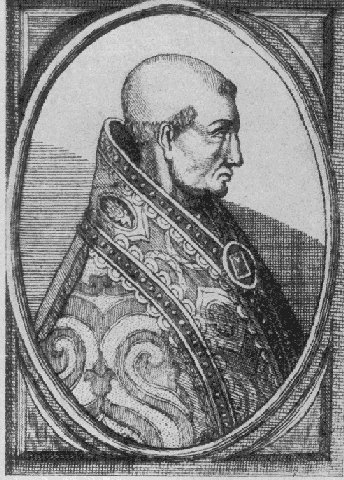
Urban IV

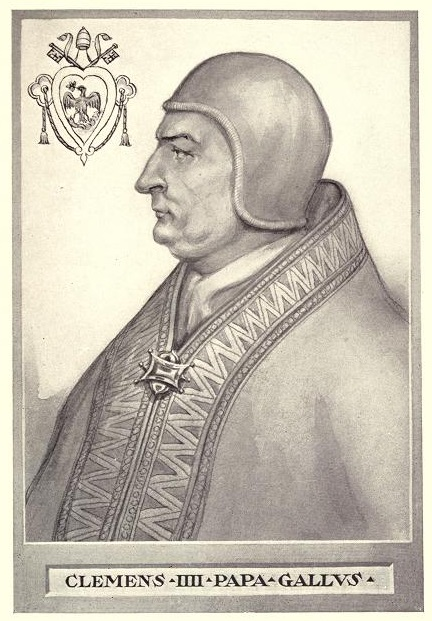
Clement IV

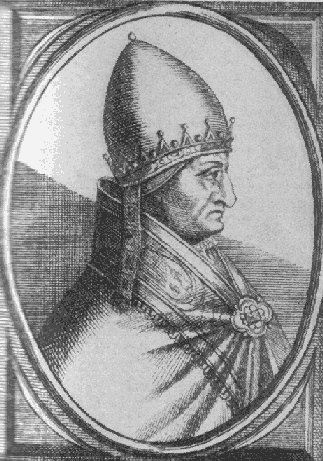
Gregory X

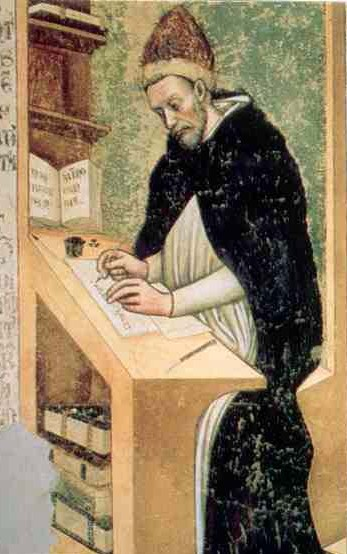
Innocent V

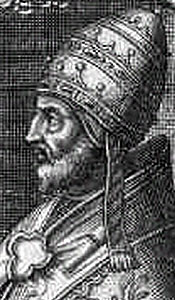
Adrian V

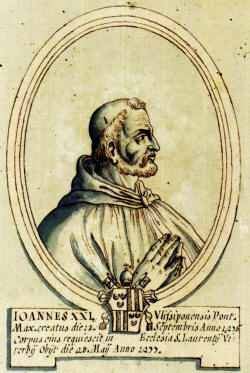
John XXI

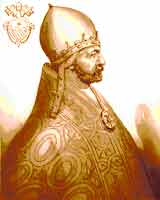
Nicholas III

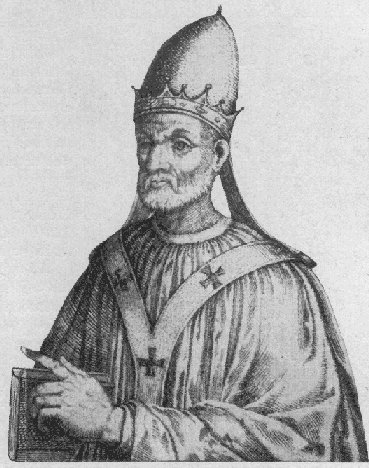
Martin IV
