= Jean Benedicti =

French Franciscan theologian

Jean Benedicti was a French Franciscan theologian of the sixteenth century.

He belonged to the Observantine Province of Tours and Poitiers. He became in time secretary of the order and in this capacity accompanied the minister-general, Christopher a Capite Fontium, throughout the whole of Europe in the latter's canonical visitation of Franciscan houses.

Afterwards he was made commissary-general of the French and visitor of many Italian Provinces, and in order to fulfill a vow went on a pilgrimage to Palestine. Luke Wadding says that he was a man of distinguished parts and great culture, having mastered the learning of his day and being conversant with the Hebrew, Greek, and Latin tongues.

His remains were interred in the Friary at Laval.

== Works ==
In 1599 the first edition of his Somme des péchés et le remède d'iceux comprenant tous les cas de conscience was published in Paris, and was immediately in demand among confessors. After having been revised, corrected, and augmented by the Theological Faculty of Paris, it reached a fifteenth edition.

He also wrote La triomphante victoire de la Sainte Vierge, which tells of an exorcism in the church of the Cordeliers at Lyon.
