= Penitential canons =

Religious rules regarding penances to be done for certain sins

Penitential canons are religious rules laid down by councils or bishops concerning the penances to be done for various sins. These canons, collected, adapted to later practice, and completed by suitable directions formed the nucleus of the Penitential Books (see Moral Theology).

They all belong to the ancient penitential discipline and retain only a historic interest; if the writers of the classical period continue to cite them, it is only as examples, and to excite sinners to repentance by reminding them of earlier severity. In a certain sense, they survive, for the granting of indulgences is based on the periods of penance, years, days, and quarantines. The penitential canons may be divided into three classes corresponding to the penitential discipline of the East, of Rome, or of the Anglo-Saxon Churches.

== Penitential canons of the East ==
In the East, the prominent feature of penance was not the practice of mortification and pious works, though this was supposed; the penance imposed on sinners was a longer or shorter period of exclusion from communion and the Mass, to which they were gradually admitted to the different penitential "stations" or classes, three in number; for the "weepers" (proschlaiontes, flentes), mentioned occasionally, were not yet admitted to penance; they were great sinners who had to await their admission outside of the church. Once admitted, the penitents became "hearers" (achrooeenoi, audientes), and assisted at the Divine service until after the lessons and the homily; then, the "prostrated" (hypopiptontes, prostrati), because the bishop before excluding them, prayed over them while imposing his hands on them as they lay prostrate; finally the systantes, consistentes, who assisted at the whole service, but did not receive communion. The penance ended with the rest of the faithful. These different periods amounted in all to three, five, ten, twelve, or fifteen years, according to the gravity of the sins.

This discipline, which was rapidly mitigated, ceased to be observed by the close of the fourth century. The relative penitential canons are contained in the canonical letter of St. Gregory Thaumaturgus (about 263; P. G., X, 1019), the Councils of Ancyra (314), Neocaesarea (314–20), Nicaea (325), and the three canonical letters of St. Basil to Amphilochius (Ep. 188, 199, 217 in P. G., XXXII, 663, 719, 794). They passed into the Greek Collections and the Penitential Books. Those laid down by the councils passed to the West in different translations, but were misunderstood or not enforced.

== Penitential canons of Rome ==
The Roman penitential discipline did not recognize the various "stations", or classes; with this exception, it was like the discipline of the East. The penitential exercises were not settled in detail, and the punishment properly so called consisted in exclusion from communion for a longer or shorter period. But the practice of admitting to penance only once, which kept the penitents in a fixed order, was maintained longer.

The most ancient Western canons relate to the admission or exclusion from public penance; for instance, the decision of Callixtus (Tertullian, "De pudic.", i) to admit adulterers, that of St. Cyril and the Council of Carthage (251) (Ep. 56) to admit the lapsi or apostates, although the Council of Elvira (about 300, Can. 1, 6, 8, etc.) still refused to admit very great sinners. Other canons of this council ordained penances of several years' duration.

After Elvira and the Council of Arles in 314, the penitential canons were rather infrequent. They are more numerous in the councils and decretals of the popes after the close of the fourth century—Siricius, Innocent, and later St. Leo. They reduce the duration of the penance very much and are more merciful towards the lapsi or apostates. These texts, with the translations of the Eastern councils, passed into the Western canonical collections.

== Penitential canons of the Anglo-Saxon and Irish Churches ==
More striking in the penitential canons of Anglo-Saxon and Irish origin is the particular fixation of the penitential acts imposed on the sinner to ensure reparation, and their duration in days, quarantines (carina), and years; these consisted in more or less rigorous fasts, prostrations, deprivation of things otherwise allowable; also alms, prayers, pilgrimages, etc.

These canons, unknown to us in their sources, are contained in the numerous so-called Penitential Books (Libri Poenitentiales) or collections made in, and in vogue from, the seventh century.

These canons and the penitential discipline they represent are introduced to the Continent by Anglo-Saxon missionaries, and were at first received unfavourably (Council of Châlons, 814; Paris, 829); finally, however, they were adopted and gradually mitigated. (See COLLECTION OF ANCIENT Canons.)
