= Guglielmo Fieschi =

- Elected: May 28, 1244
- Other post: Cardinal-Deacon of Sant'Eustachio (1244-1256)

Personal details
- Born: c. 1215 Genoa, Republic of Genoa
- Died: March 23, 1256 (aged 40–41) Rome, Papal States
- Buried: San Lorenzo fuori le mura

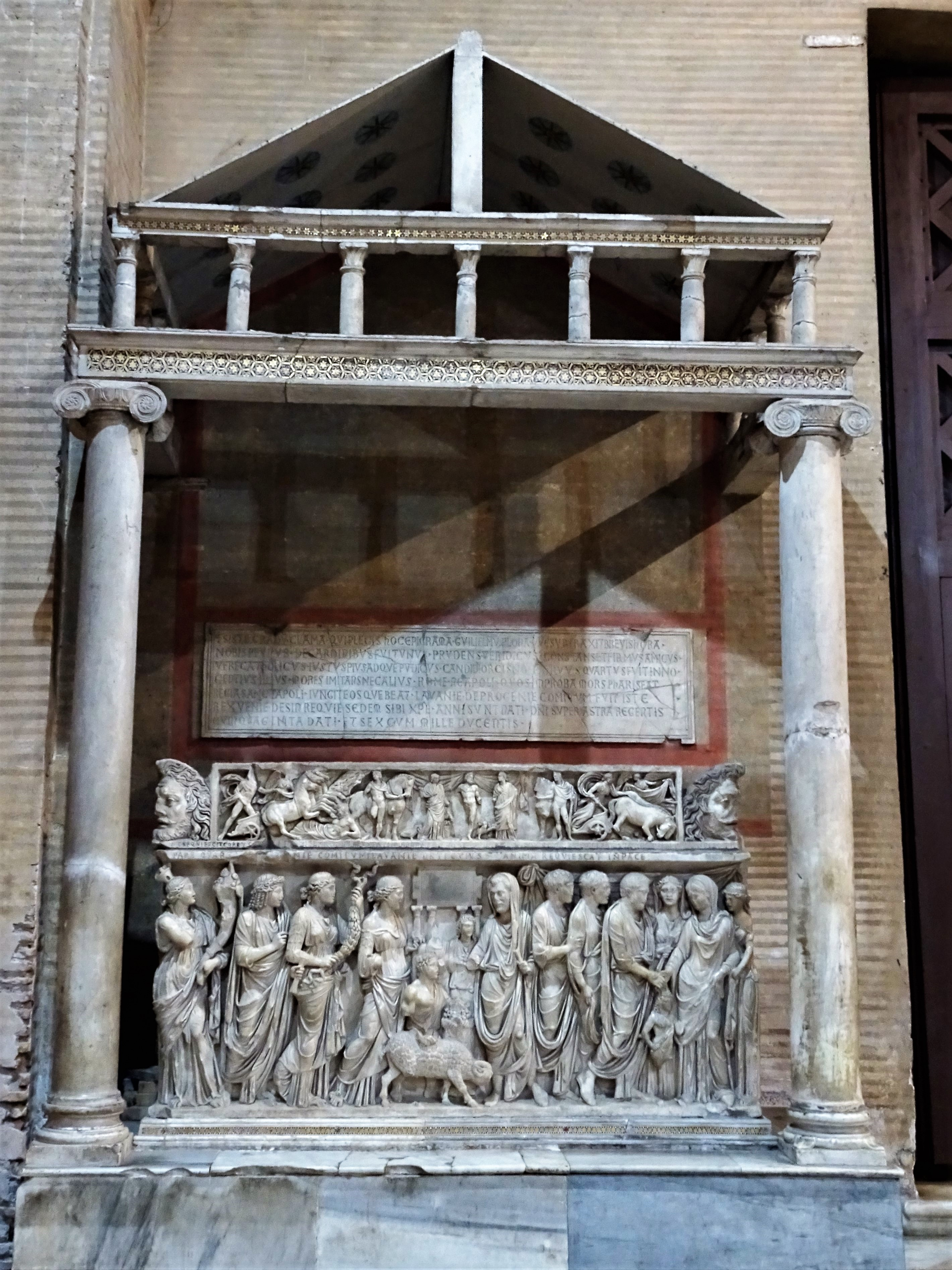
Tomb San Lorenzo fuori le Mura

Guglielmo Fieschi (c. 1215 — March 23, 1256) was an Italian cardinal and cardinal-nephew of Pope Innocent IV, his uncle, who elevated him on May 28, 1244.

Fieschi was born between 1210 and 1220 in Genoa, but nothing is known about his life before his elevation to the cardinalate. As cardinal, he received the title of deacon of Sant'Eustachio. He subscribed with this title the papal bulls issued between September 27, 1244, and August 28, 1255. He accompanied his uncle the pope in his escape from Rome, in 1244 and went with him to Genoa, and then to France. He participated in the First Council of Lyon in 1245. He served as papal legate in various parts of Italy from 1252–54. He was one of the cardinal electors in the papal election, 1254. He acted also as protector of the orders of the Servites (1251) and the Humiliati (1253). Fieschi died on March 23, 1256, in Rome, and was buried at San Lorenzo fuori le mura.
