= John of Toledo =

English Cistercian and Cardinal

John of Toledo O. Cist.
- Cardinal-Bishop of Porto e Santa Rufina
- Church: Roman Catholic
- In office: 1262–1275
- Predecessor: Giacomo da Castell'Arquato
- Successor: Robert Kilwardby
- Other post: Dean of the College of Cardinals
- Previous post: Cardinal-Priest of San Lorenzo in Lucina (1244–62)

Orders
- Created cardinal: 28 May 1244 by Pope Innocent IV
- Rank: Cardinal-Bishop

Personal details
- Died: 1275

John of Toledo (died 1275) was an English Cistercian and Cardinal.

Little is known about John before 1244: He was born in England, had studied medicine in Toledo and acquired theological skills at an unknown place. He became a Cistercian monk in the French abbey of Clairvaux and together with other clerics while on the way to a synod in Rome, he was captured by the troops of Emperor Frederick II in 1241 and was his prisoner for about two years, together with another Cistercian, the cardinal bishop of Palestrina, Giacomo da Pecorara.

Created cardinal priest of San Lorenzo in Lucina in 1244 by Pope Innocent IV, he became bishop of Porto and Santa Rufina in 1262. He took part in the Papal election of 1268 to 1271 at Viterbo and was Dean of the College of Cardinals in January 1273.

He died in 1275.
