= Gil Torres (cardinal) =

Gil Torres (died 11 November 1254) was a Leonese cleric and the cardinal-deacon of Santi Cosma e Damiano from 1216 until his death.

Gil was a native of Zamora. (Note: He is sometimes thought to have been a native of Burgos in Castile, since his early career was there, or of Portugal, because João de Deus dedicated to him his Notabilia cum summis super titulis Decretalium. João never calls him Portuguese. That his hometown was Zamora is most likely in light of his endowment of anniversary masses in the cathedral of Zamora for himself and members of his immediate family. Latin documents often call him Ægidius Hispanus (Gil of Spain).) Nothing is known of his life before 1206, when he is recorded among the canons of the cathedral of Burgos. (Note: He appears at the time with the honorific don, as in domnus Egidius (in Latin).) In 1209, he is recorded with the title magister, implying a formal education. In 1210, he was named archdeacon of Burgos and was sent to the Roman curia as representative of the cathedral chapter. He was still there during the Fourth Lateran Council in 1215.

Gil was named to the college of cardinals with the titulus of Santi Cosma e Damiano by Pope Honorius III in December 1216. He was almost certainly recommended to the pope by Cardinal Pelayo Gaitán and Bishop Melendo of Osma, two fellow Leonese well respected in Rome. Thereafter until his death, Gil remained with the Roman curia. (Note: He presents a striking contrast to Pelayo, who went on frequent missions abroad, including leading the Fifth Crusade and the papal army in the War of the Keys. Gil is generally thought to have been the de facto representative in the curia of the Castilian monarchs Berenguela and Ferdinand III at the height of the Reconquista, but no correspondence between him and them survives.) His influence grew quickly. In April 1217, he was described as close to King Frederick II of Germany and King Philip II of France. In April 1218, King Afonso II of Portugal claimed him as a friend. He frequently served as an auditor down to 1230, hearing cases from across Europe.

In June 1234, Gil was elected to the archdiocese of Tarragona, but declined. He is especially associated with interventionist policy of Pope Innocent IV regarding papal provision. (Note: There is ample evidence in the surviving documentation that Gil used this system to benefit his countrymen and relations, although it is possible, given his advanced age, that he was being taken advantage of by persons acting in his stead.) In 1245, Innocent assigned him the task of dividing up various sources of income between the chapters of Ávila, Burgos, Calahorra, Ciudad Rodrigo, Córdoba, Cuenca, Plasencia, Salamanca and Segovia so as to ensure an adequate living for the bishops and canons. In 1247, Gil was offered the archdiocese of Toledo, but declined.

Gil did not subscribe any papal document later than 1246, perhaps on account of old age. In 1253, he supported Robert Grosseteste's complaint against Innocent IV regarding papal provisions. It is for this reason that Matthew of Paris calls him a "pillar of truth and justice in the Roman curia" in his Chronica maiora. Matthew also records, improbably, that he was at least one hundred years old at his death. Gil died in Naples on 11 November 1254. His death is recorded in the necrologies of Burgos and Toledo. (Note: The necrology of Burgos gives the date as 11 November. The Toledan necrology is less reliable. It puts his death on 5 November and claims that he was a canon of the cathedral of Toledo.) His will, still extant in 1311, has been lost. The record does survive of his bequest to the Cistercian abbey of San Martino al Cimino of the debt that was owed him by the cathedral of Toledo. His executor was Cardinal Giovanni Gaetano Orsini.
