= Pope Alexander IV =

Head of the Catholic Church from 1254 to 1261

- Bishop of Rome
- Church: Catholic Church
- Papacy began: 12 December 1254
- Papacy ended: 25 May 1261
- Predecessor: Innocent IV
- Successor: Urban IV
- Previous posts: Cardinal-Deacon of Sant'Eustachio (1227–1232); Cardinal-Bishop of Ostia (1232–1254)

Orders
- Consecration: March 1235
- Created cardinal: 18 September 1227 by Gregory IX

Personal details
- Born: Rinaldo di Jenne c. 1185 or 1199 Jenne, Papal States
- Died: 25 May 1261 (aged approximately 62–76) Viterbo, Papal States
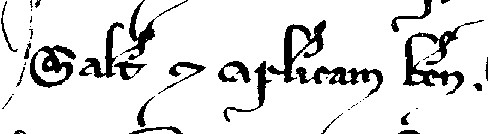
- Signature

- Coat of arms

Pope Alexander IV (Italian: Alessandro IV; c. 1185 or 1199 – 25 May 1261), born Rinaldo di Jenne, was head of the Catholic Church and ruler of the Papal States from 12 December 1254 to his death in 1261. In 1255, Alexander IV canonized Saint Clare of Assisi, founder of the religious order for women called the Poor Clares.

== Early career ==
He was born as Rinaldo di Jenne in Jenne (now in the Province of Rome). On his mother's side, he was a member of the house Conti di Segni, the counts of Segni, like Pope Innocent III and Pope Gregory IX. His uncle Gregory IX made him cardinal deacon and Protector of the Order of Franciscans in 1227, Camerlengo of the Holy Roman Church from 1227 until 1231 and Bishop of Ostia in 1231 (or 1232). On the death of Pope Innocent IV, in 1254, he was elected pope at Naples on 12 December 1254.

== Pontificate ==
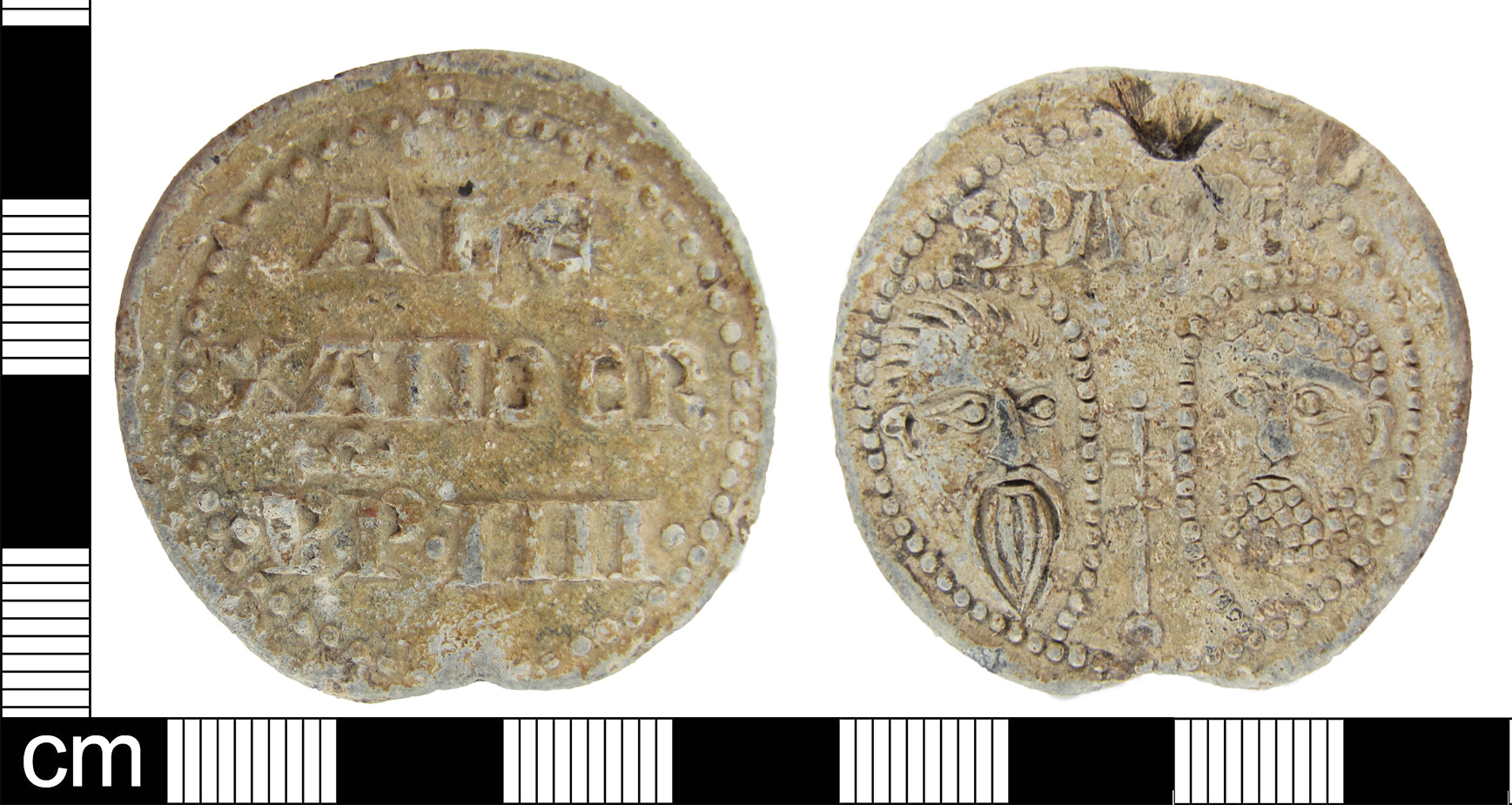
Bulla with inscription ALEXANDER PP IIII (pastor pastorum, "shepherd of shepherds")

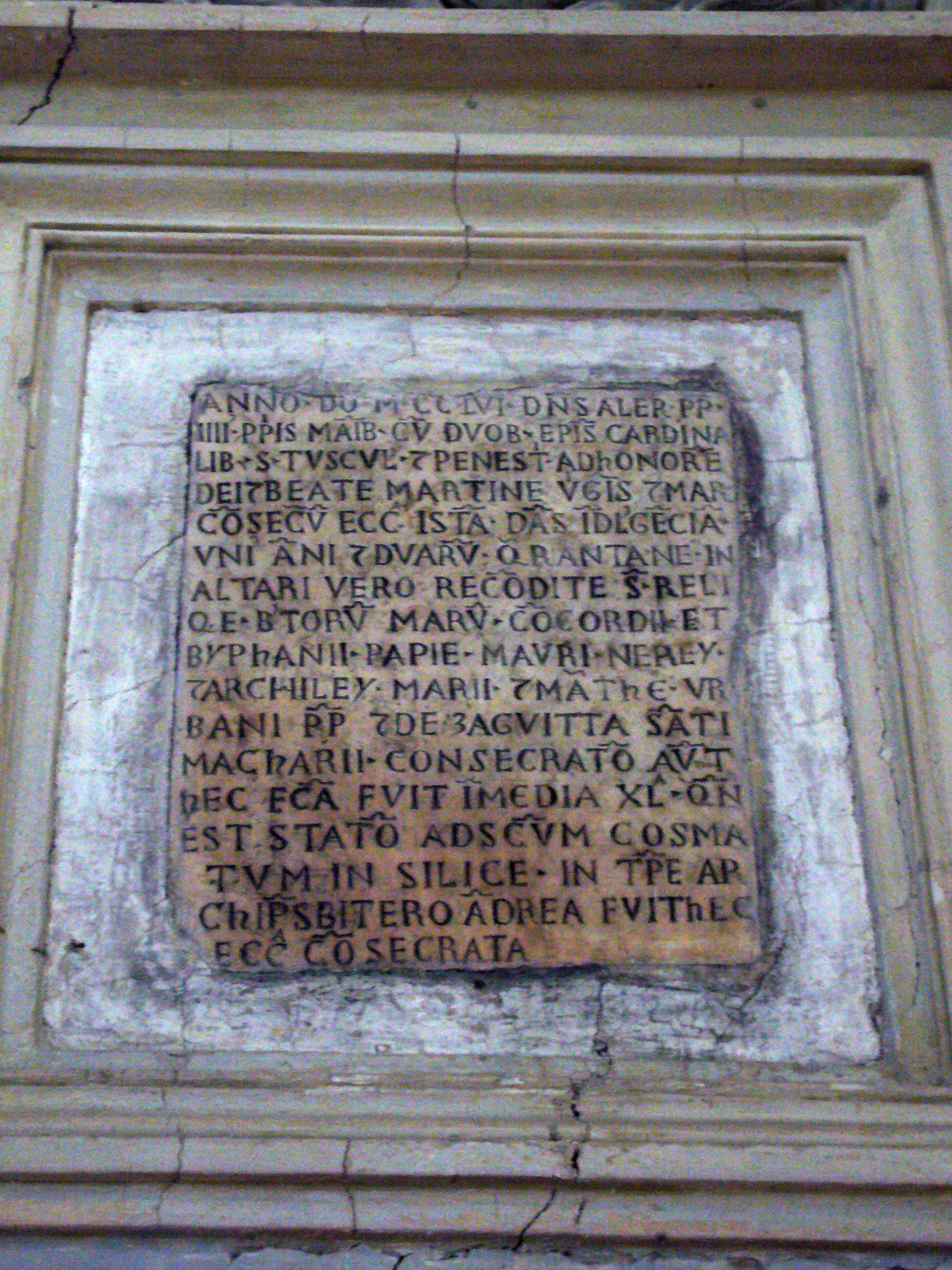
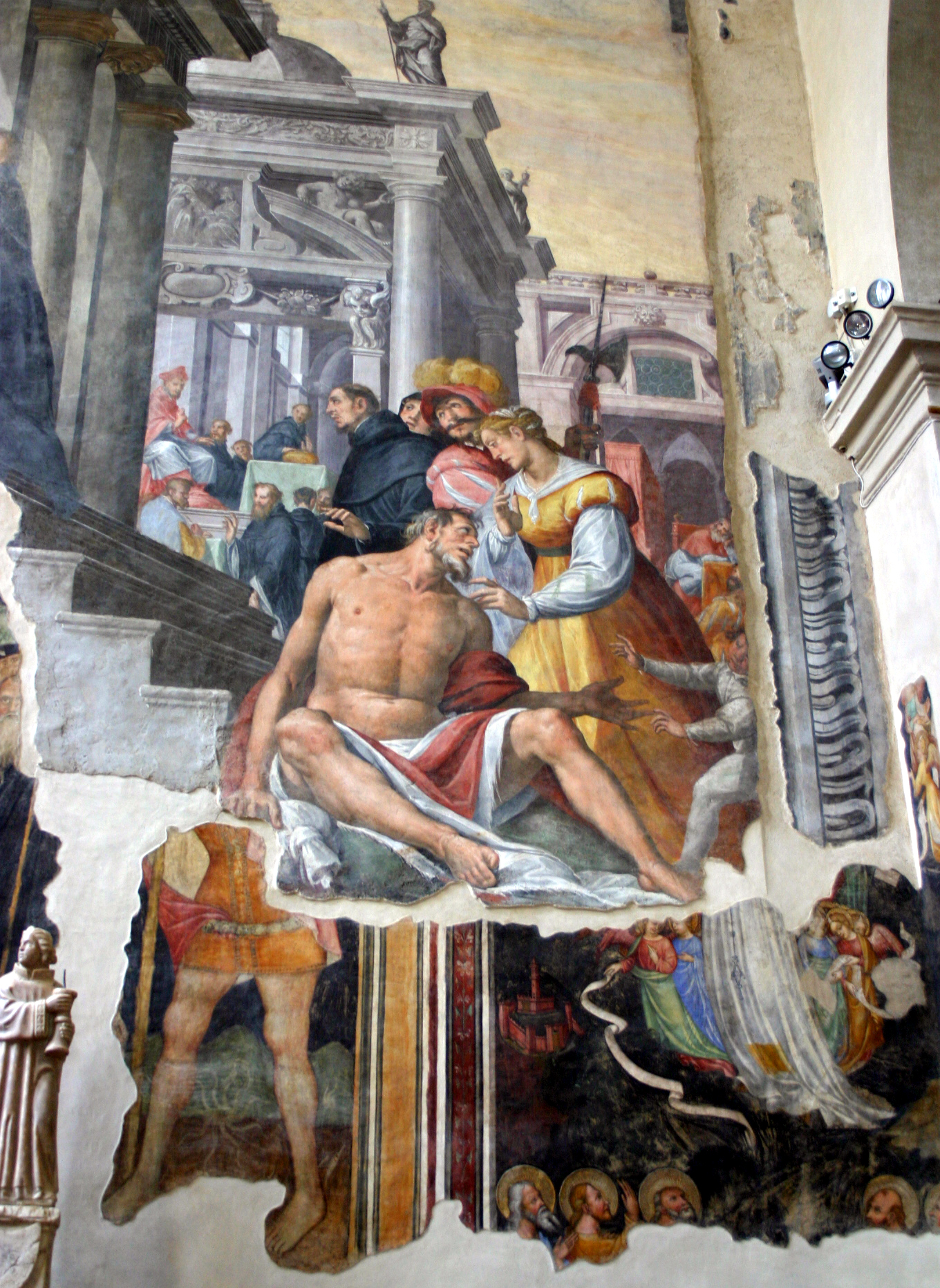
Plaque in the church of Santi Luca e Martina commemorating Alexander IV's 1256 consecration of the building (left), Fresco in San Marco, Milan depicting Alexander IV founding the Augustinians (right).

Alexander's pontificate was signalled by efforts to reunite the Eastern Orthodox churches with the Catholic Church, by the establishment of the Inquisition in France, by favours shown to the mendicant orders, and by an attempt to organize a crusade against the Mongols after the second Mongol raid against Poland in 1259.

On 26 September 1255, Alexander IV canonized Saint Clare of Assisi, founder of the religious order for women called the Poor Clares. On 29 October 1255, in the papal bull Benigna Operatio, Alexander declared "his own knowledge" of the stigmata attributed to Saint Francis of Assisi.

In 1256, Alexander IV condemned theories of Joachim of Fiore, a millenarian prophet who had died in 1202 and whose ideas were taken up by the Fraticelli strand of the Franciscan Order. On the basis of his interpretation of the Book of Revelation, Joachim had postulated that 1260 would see the beginning of a Third Age, an age governed by the Holy Spirit, in which the hierarchy of the Church would become unnecessary - an idea which was obviously unwelcome to the Pope. In the event, 1260 – still in Alexander IV's lifetime – came and went with no such Third Age materializing, but Joachim's ideas would in later centuries be taken up by the Cult of the Holy Spirit which had a major impact in Portugal and its colonies.

The pontiff also, on 27 September 1258, declared in the bull Quod super nonnullis that "divination or sorcery" was not to be investigated by Inquisitors of the Church, who were tasked with investigating heresy. Crimes involving magic should be left to local authorities unless they had "knowledge of manifest heresy to be involved", wherein "manifest heresy" included "praying at the altars of idols, to offer sacrifices, to consult demons, [or] to elicit responses from them". At this period in Church history, the use of magic was not seen as inherently heretical, but rather rooted in superstition or erroneous beliefs.

=== Sicily ===
On 14 May 1254, shortly before his death, Innocent IV had granted Sicily, a papal fiefdom, to Edmund, second son of King Henry III of England. Alexander confirmed the grant on 9 April 1255, in return for 2,000 troy ounces (62 kg) of gold per annum, the service of 300 knights for three months when required, and 135,541 marks (about 32 tonnes of silver) to reimburse the pope for the money he had expended attempting to oust Manfred from Sicily. Henry's unsuccessful attempts to persuade his subjects to pay the taxes required to meet Alexander's demands were one of the factors in the conflict between the king and parliament which culminated in the Second Barons' War. In 1256, when relations between the two men were strained, Alexander firmly rejected Henry's choice of Archbishop of Dublin. On 12 April 1261, shortly before his death, Alexander issued a papal bull for King Henry that absolved him and the magnates of his realm from the oaths taken in the Provisions of Oxford, which was instrumental in the War.

Alexander IV succeeded Innocent IV as guardian of Conradin, the last of the Hohenstaufens, promising him protection; but in less than three weeks he conspired against him and bitterly opposed Conradin's uncle Manfred. Alexander IV threatened excommunication and interdict against the party of Manfred without effect. Nor could he enlist the kings of England and Norway in a crusade against the Hohenstaufens. Rome itself became too Ghibelline for the Pope, who withdrew to Viterbo, where he died on 25 May 1261. He was buried in Viterbo Cathedral, but his tomb was destroyed during sixteenth-century renovations.

== See also ==
- List of popes
- Cardinals created by Alexander IV
- Battle of Ain Jalut

== Bibliography ==
- Nicolaus de Curbio, OFM, "Vita Innocentii Papae IV," Ludovico Antonio Muratori, Rerum Italicarum Scriptores Tomus Tertius (Mediolani 1723) pp. 592–592e.
- Bernardus Guidonis, "Vita Alexandri Papae IV," Ludovico Antonio Muratori, Rerum Italicarum Scriptores Tomus Tertius (Mediolani 1723) pp. 592–593.
- Alexis François Artaud de Montor, Histoire des souverains Pontifes Romains Tome III (Paris 1851), pp. 1–11.
- Augustinus Theiner (Editor), Caesaris S. R. E. Cardinalis Baronii, Od. Raynaldi et Jac. Laderchii Annales Ecclesiastici Tomus Vigesimus Primus 1229–1256 (Barri-Ducis: Ludovicus Guerin 1870).
- August Karst, Geschichte Manfreds vom Tode Friedrichs II. bis zu seiner Krönung (1250–1258) (Berlin: E. Ebering 1897) [Historische Studien, Heft VI.].
- Bourel de la Roncière, Charles, ed. (1895). Les Registres d'Alexandre IV. Vol. 1. Paris: Thorin. Archived from the original on 2025-10-08.
- F. Gregorovius, History of Rome in the Middle Ages, Volume V. 2, 2nd ed., revised (London: George Bell, 1906) Book X, Chapter 1, pp. 335–358.
- F. Tenckhoff, Papst Alexander IV. (Paderborn 1907).
- S. Andreotta, "La famiglia di Alessandro IV e l'abbazia di Subiaco," Atti e Memorie della Società Tiburtina di Storia ed Arte 35 (1962) 63–126; 36 (1963) 5–87.
- de Lama, Ildefonso Rodríguez (1976). La documentación pontificia de Alejandro IV (1254–1261) (in Spanish). Rome: Instituto Español de Historia Eclesiástica. ISBN 978-8473590471.
- Raoul Manselli, "Alessandro IV Archived 2015-12-08 at the Wayback Machine," Dizionario dei Papi (2000).
- Richard, Jean (1999). The Crusades: c. 1071 – c. 1291. Cambridge University Press. ISBN 978-0-521-62566-1.
- Harding, Alan (1993). England in the Thirteenth Century. Cambridge University Press. ISBN 978-0521316125.
- Herbermann, Charles, ed. (1913). "Pope Alexander IV" . Catholic Encyclopedia. New York: Robert Appleton Company.

Attribution

Catholic Church titles
| Preceded by Ugolino di Conti | Cardinal-bishop of Ostia; 1231–54 | Succeeded by Hugh of Saint-Cher |
| Preceded by Innocent IV | Pope; 1254–61 | Succeeded by Urban IV |
