= List of papal conclaves =

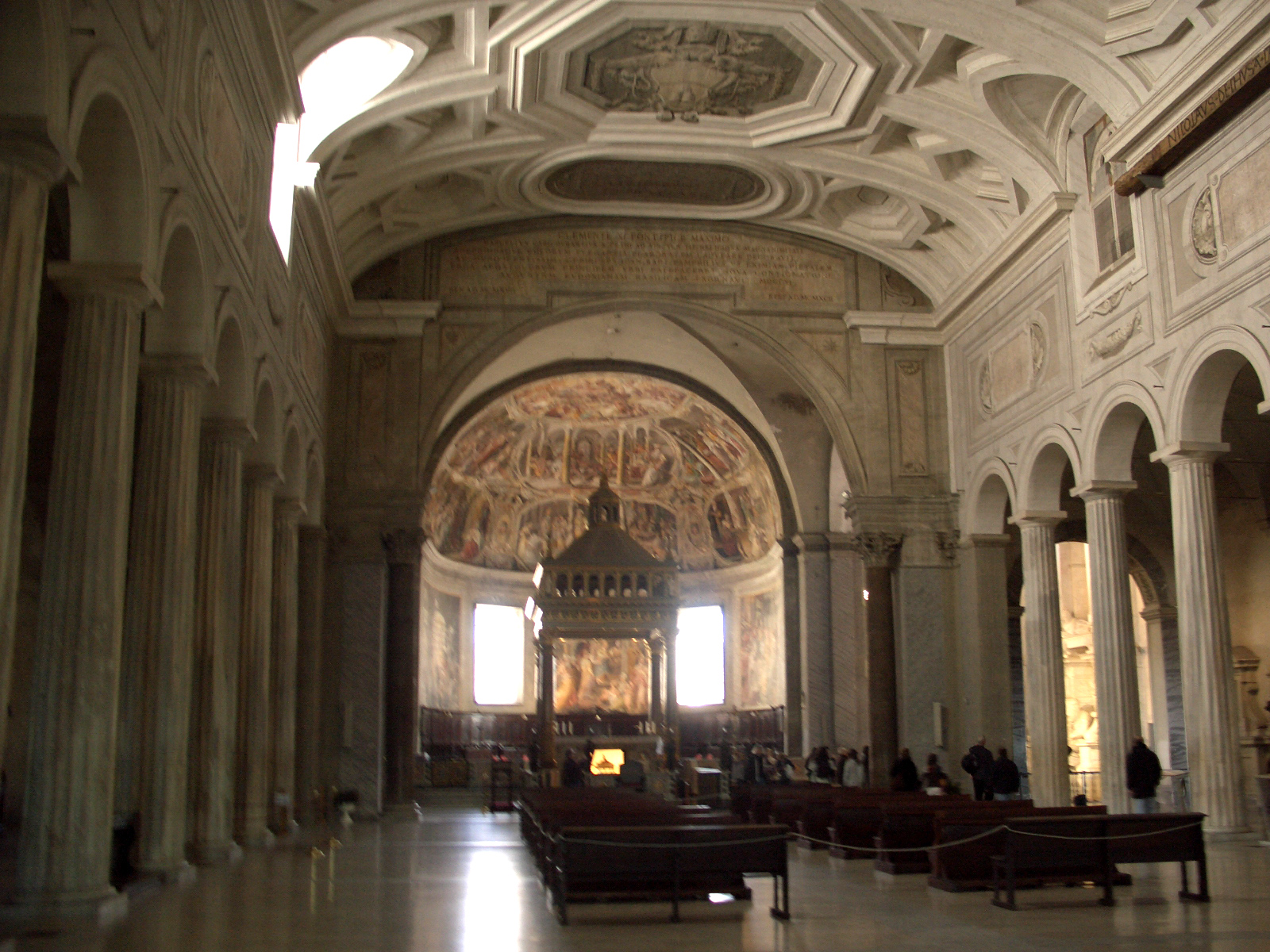
The first papal election following In nomine Domini (1059) took place in San Pietro in Vincoli ("Saint Peter in Chains") rather than Old St. Peter's Basilica due to intense secular opposition to the new papal selection process.

Papal elections since 1276 have taken the form of conclaves, which are elections that follow a set of rules and procedures developed in In nomine Domini (1059), Ubi periculum (1274) and later papal bulls; observance of the conclave varied until 1294, but all papal elections since have followed relatively similar conclave procedures.

Although the cardinals have historically gathered at a handful of other locations within Rome and beyond, only five elections since 1455 have been held outside the Apostolic Palace. Twenty-eight papal elections have been held outside Rome, in: Terracina (1088), Cluny (1119), Velletri (1181), Verona (1185), Ferrara (October 1187), Pisa (December 1187), Perugia (1216, 1264–1265, 1285, 1292–1294, 1304–1305), Anagni (1243), Naples (1254, 1294), Viterbo (1261, 1268–1271, July 1276, August–September 1276, 1277, 1281–1282), Arezzo (January 1276), Carpentras/Lyon (1314–1316), Avignon (1334, 1342, 1352, 1362, 1370), Konstanz (1417) and Venice (1799–1800). Three elections moved between locations while in progress: the elections of 1268–1271, 1292–1294, and 1314–1316.

== Papal elections ==
Elections that elected papal claimants currently regarded by the Catholic Church as antipopes are italicized.

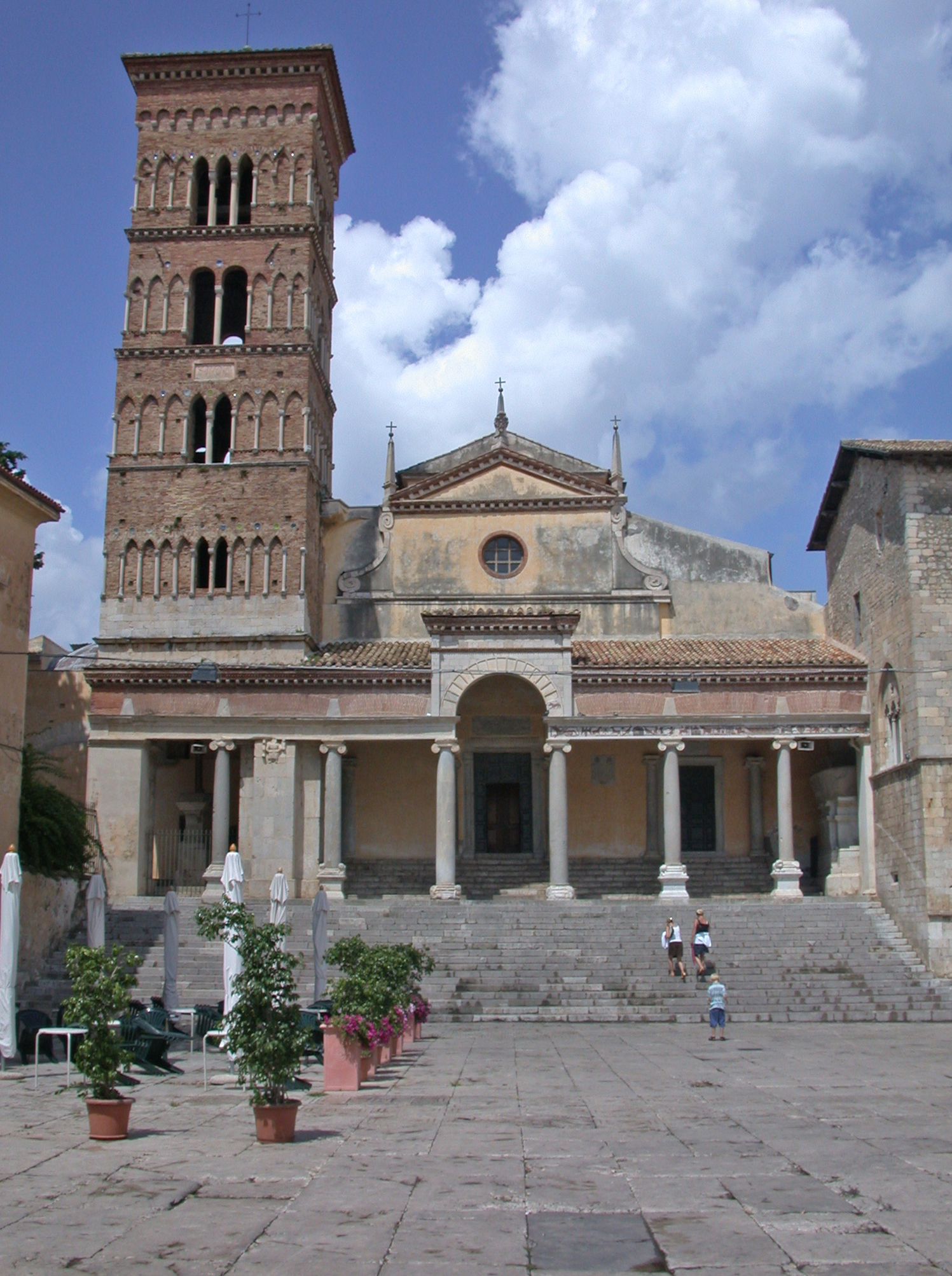
SS. Pietro e Cesareo in Terracina, the site of the first papal election outside Rome

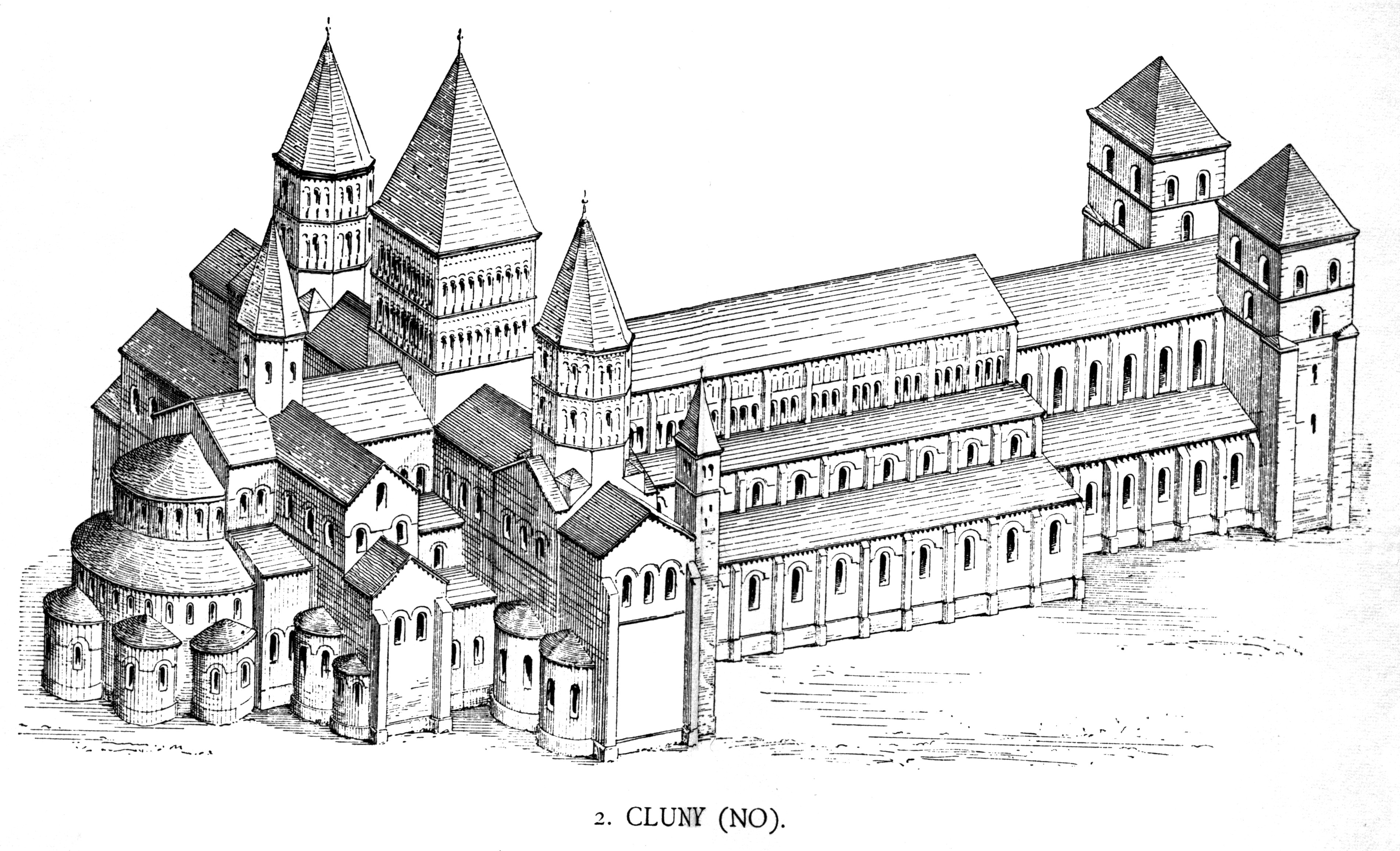
The 1119 papal election took place in Cluny Abbey as a result of the expulsion of Pope Gelasius II from Rome by Henry V, Holy Roman Emperor following the Investiture Controversy.

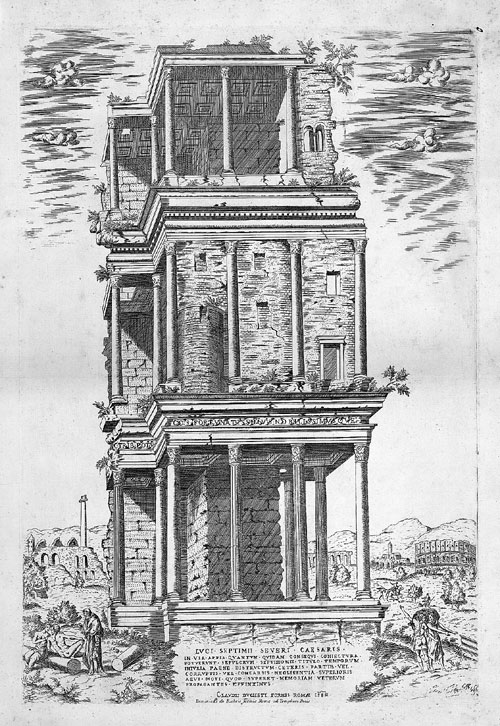
Senator Matteo Rosso Orsini confined the cardinals to the Septizodium during the 1241 election.

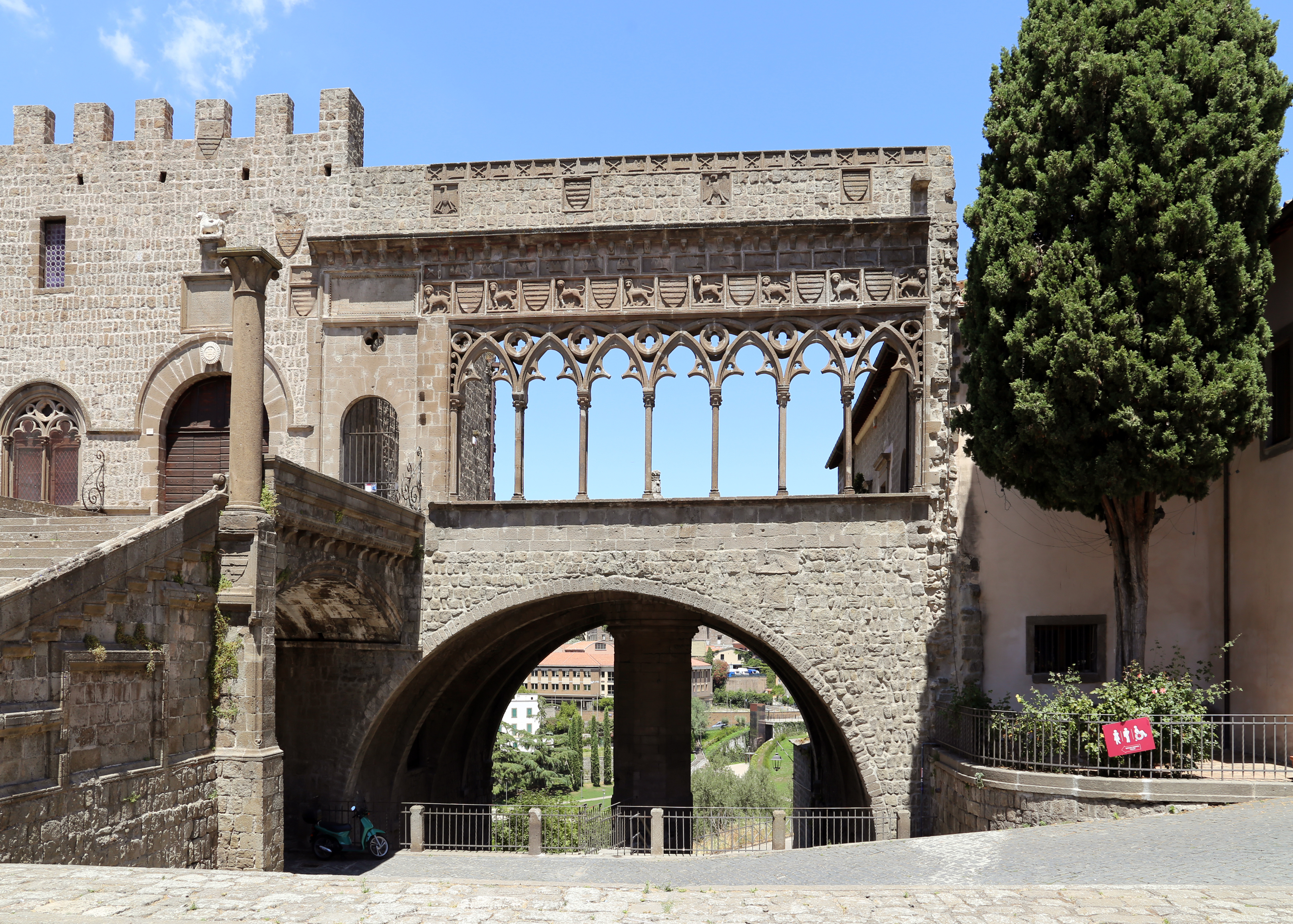
The Magistrates of Viterbo removed the roof of the Palazzo dei Papi di Viterbo during the 1268–71 election and removed two cardinal electors from the Palace during the 1280–81 election.

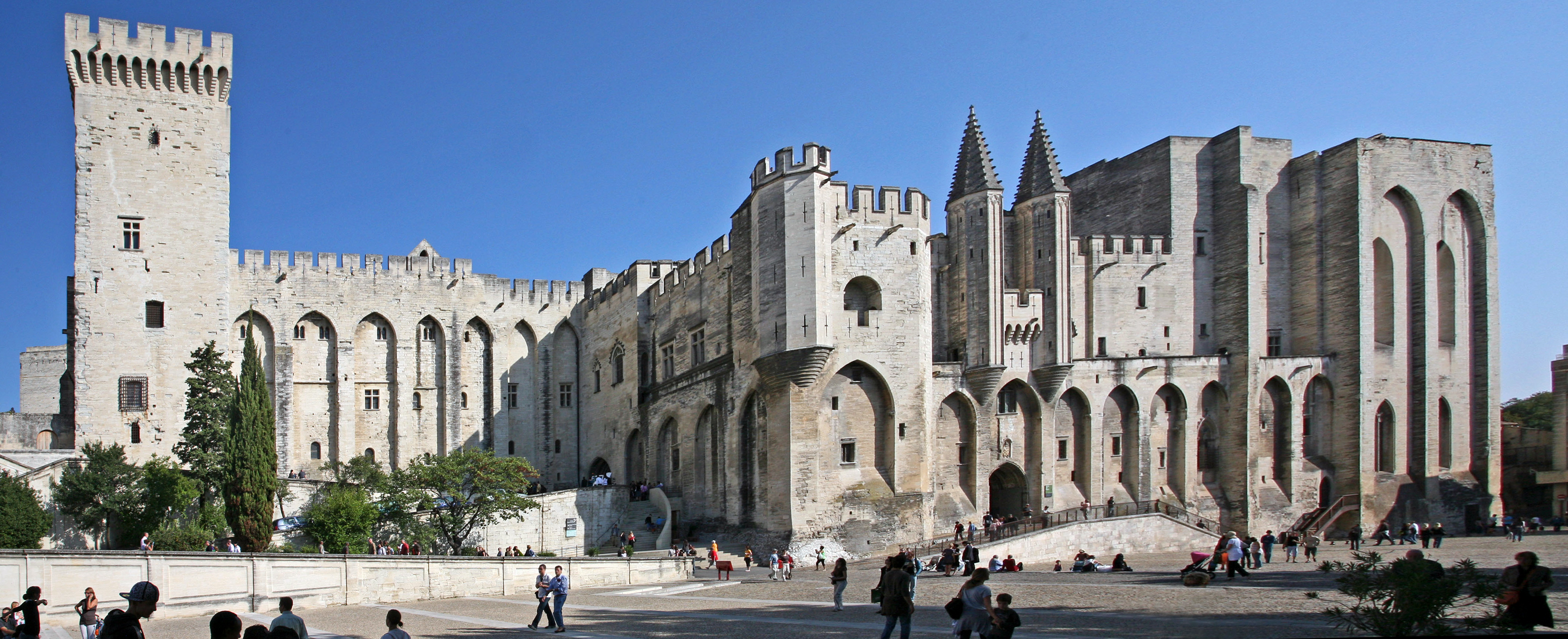
The Palais des Papes, the site of most conclaves during the Avignon Papacy

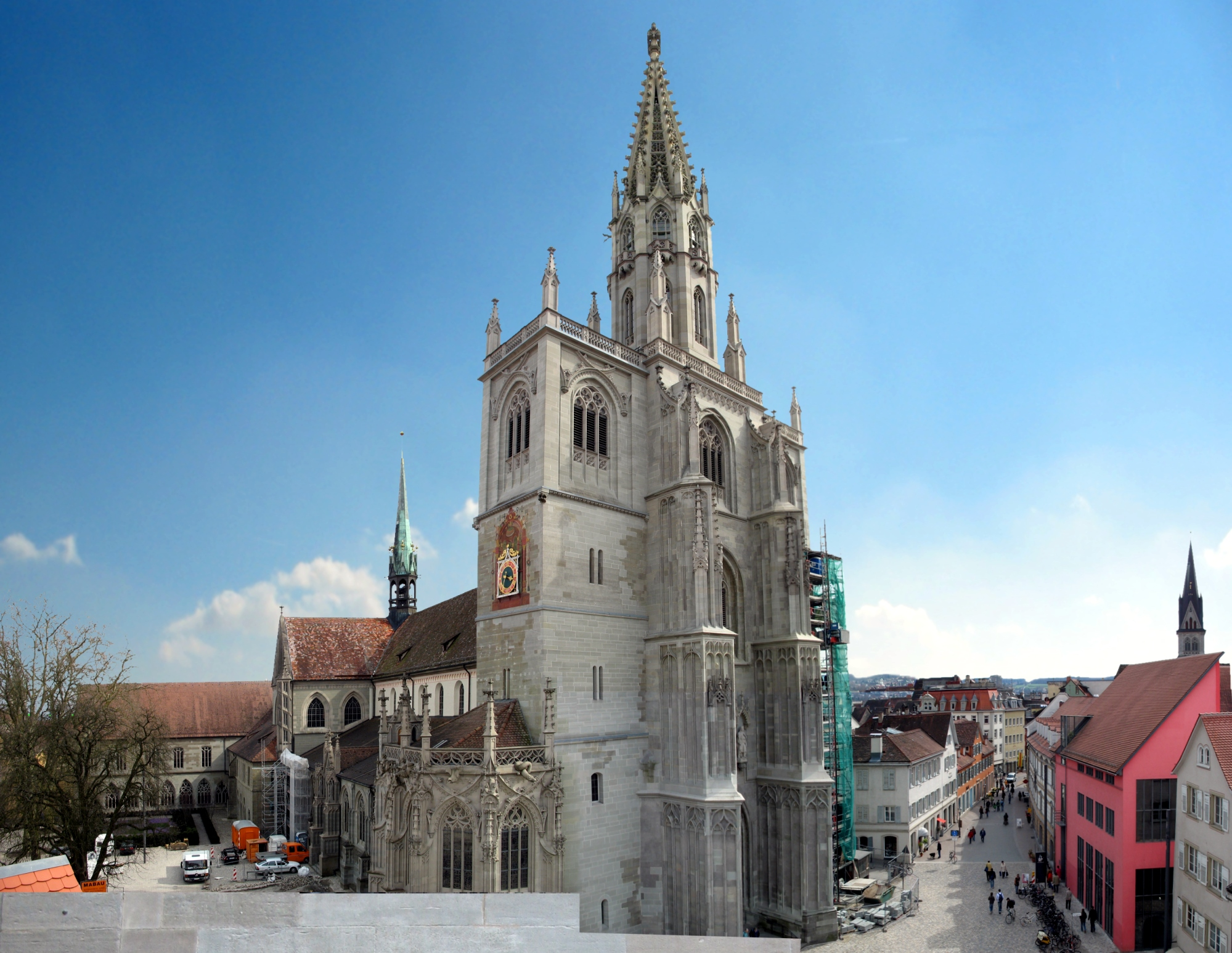
The Konstanz Minster, the site of the Council of Constance, the last papal election outside Italy

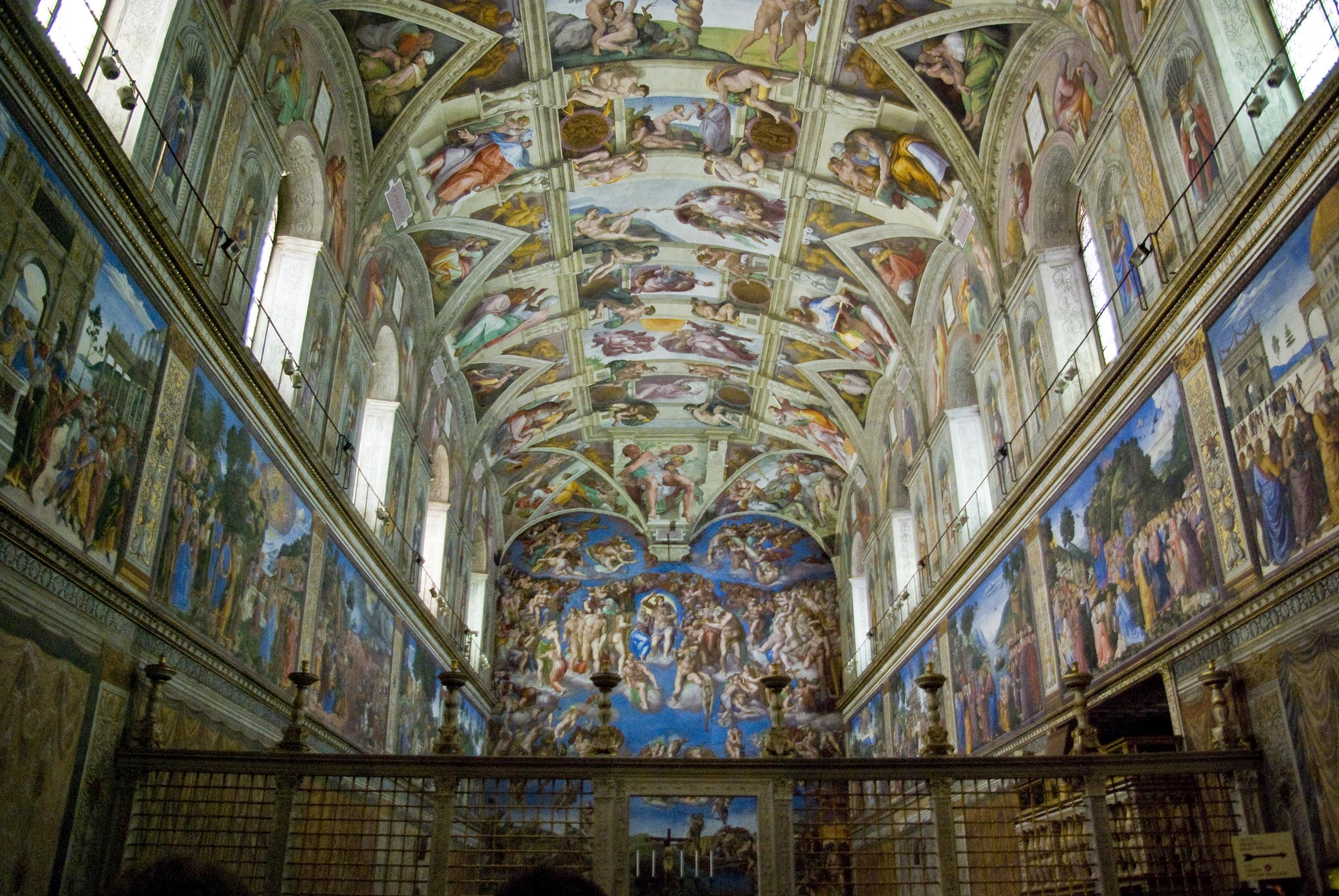
The 1492 conclave was the first held in the Sistine Chapel of the Apostolic Palace, the site of all conclaves since 1878.

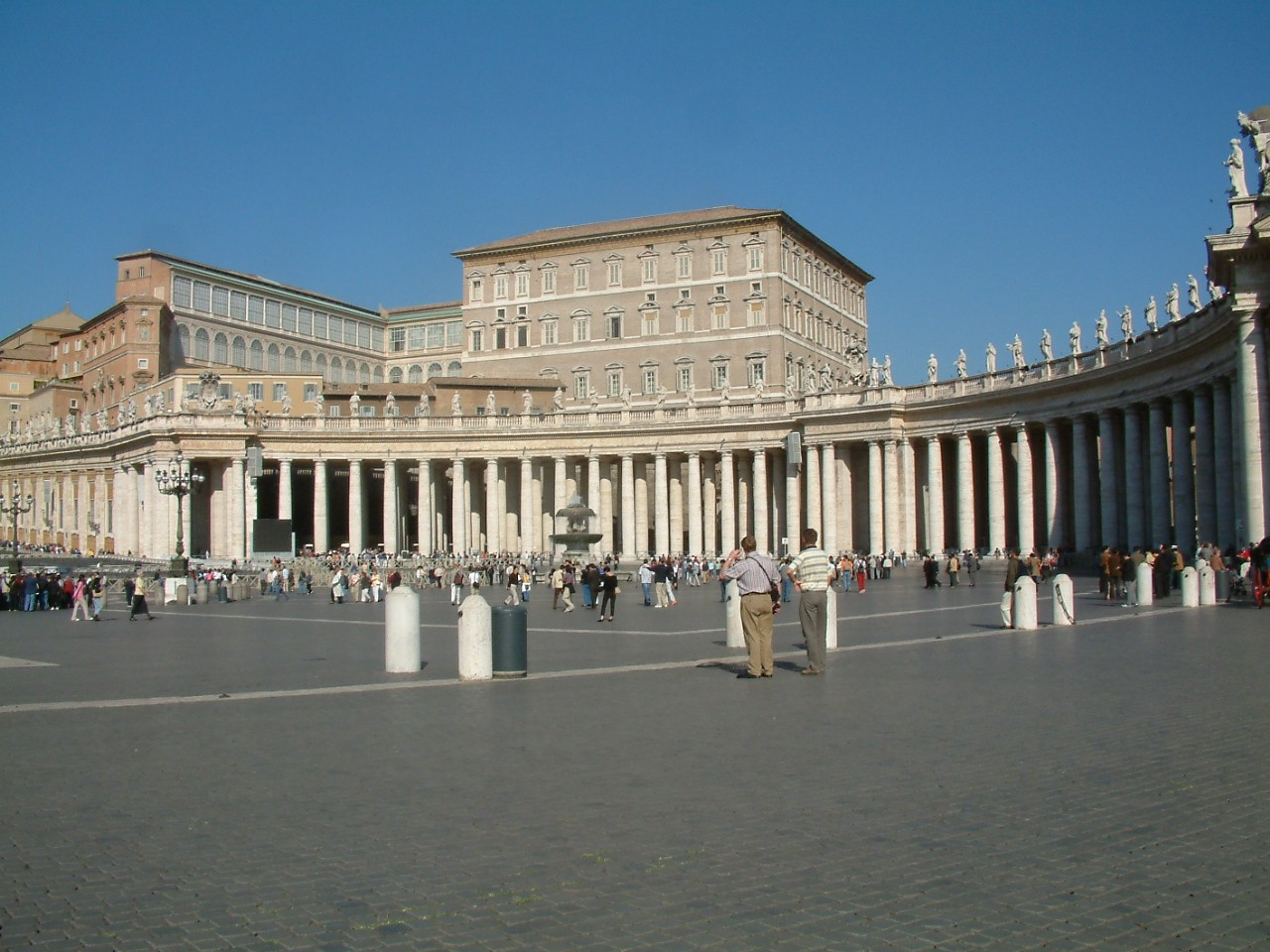
All but five conclaves since 1455 have been held in the Apostolic Palace.

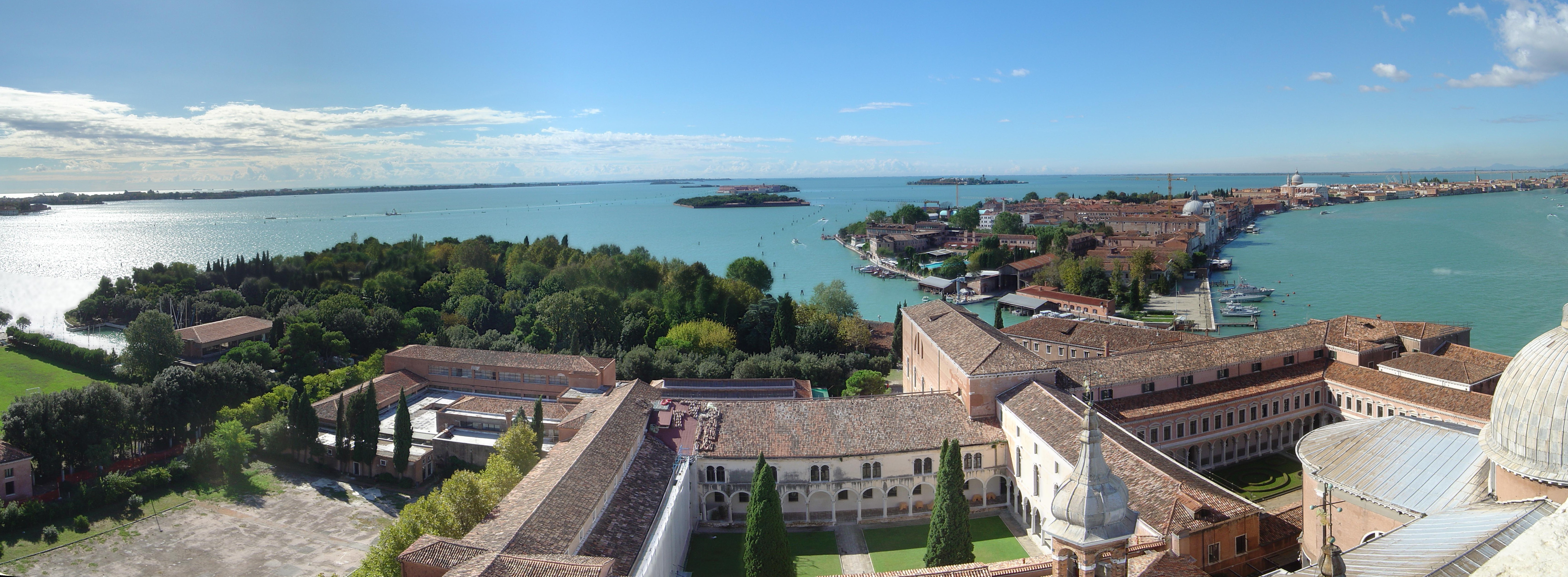
The 1799–1800 conclave was held in San Giorgio Monastery in Venice, the last papal election site outside of Rome.

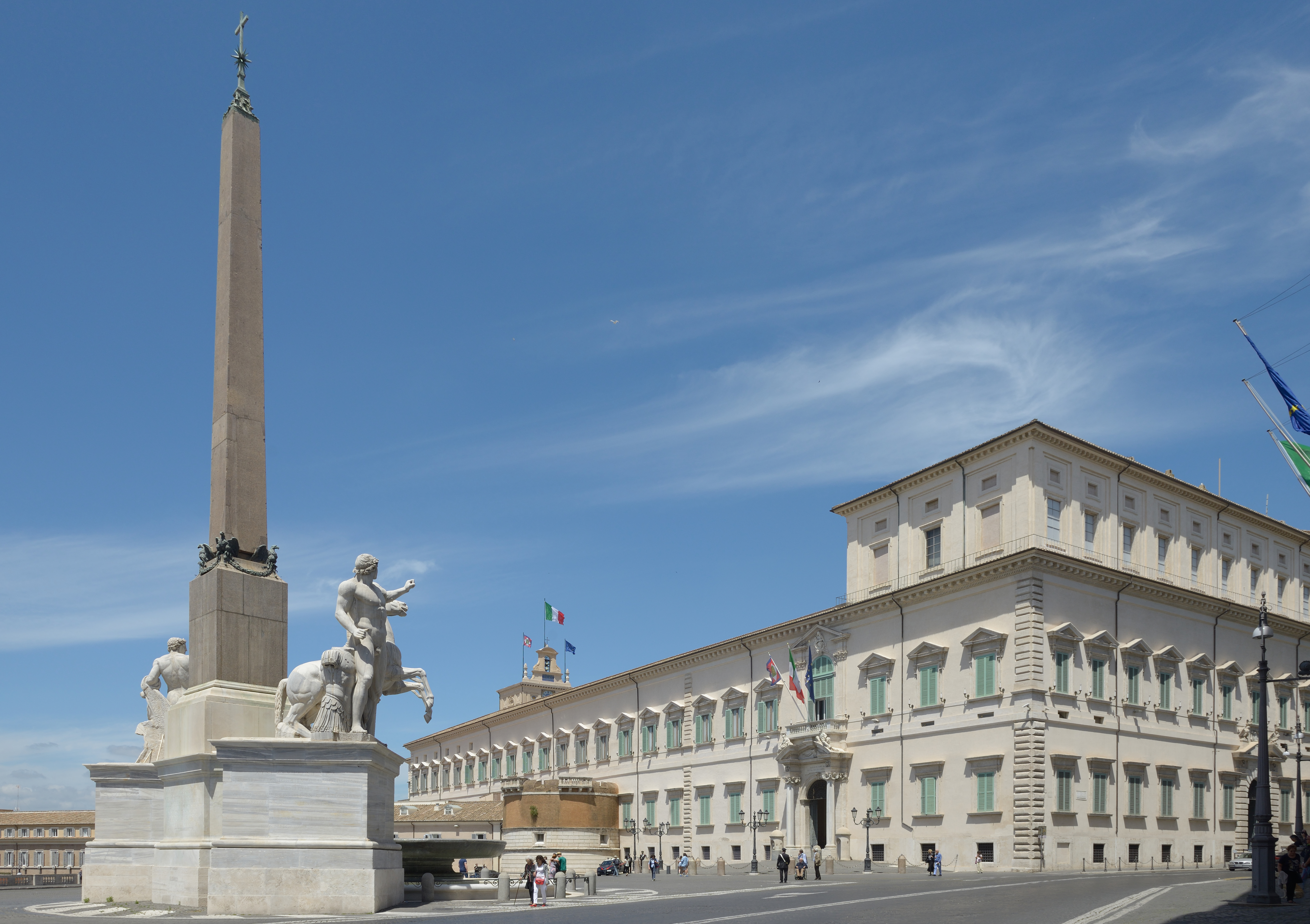
The Quirinal Palace was the site of the four conclaves prior to the seizure of Rome by the forces of the Italian unification.

Election	Elected pope	Location	Eligible electors	Electors	Duration	Ref.
1061 papal election	Pope Alexander II	San Pietro in Vincoli (Rome)	6 (Note: In the early days of the College of Cardinals, a total of seven cardinal-bishop positions existed, assuming all positions are filled at the time of an election, this represents the maximum number of potential electors. (Baumgartner, p. 27) By 1150, two of these posts had been combined, and until 1913 there were a total of 6 cardinal-bishops. In 1586 Sixtus V. revised the size of the college, these rules would stand until 1958. (Baumgartner, p. 131, compare footnote for the 1590 conclave))	6	1 day	
1073 papal election	Pope Gregory VII	San Pietro in Vincoli (Rome)	4	2	1 day (Note: According to the official protocol, Gregory was selected by an assembly in St. Peter that included cardinals and priests of the church, with the consent of attending bishops and by the acclamation of the crowd. It is unclear if the new 1059 rules were followed during his election. (Baumgartner p.24))	
1086 papal election	Pope Victor III	Santa Lucia in Septisolio (Rome)	unknown	–	1 day (Note: The election took place on 24 May 1086. However, the newly elected Desiderius initially refused the position, only accepting it at the Synod of Capua in March 1087. He was crowned on 9 May 1087.)	
1088 papal election	Pope Urban II	Santi Pietro e Cesareo (Terracina)	unknown	4	1 day (Note: Probably the first conclave that closely followed the 1059 rules. The group that elected Urban II was larger than that which had previously elected Victor III.)	
1099 papal election	Pope Paschal II	Basilica di San Clemente (Rome)	unknown	–	–	
1118 papal election	Pope Gelasius II	Santa Maria in Pallara (Rome)	unknown	4	1 day (Note: The first election under the 1059 rules for which a detailed account exists. Four cadinal-bishops along with 45 other non-voting cardinals were present when Gelasius II was elected unanimously.)	
1119 papal election	Pope Callixtus II	Cluny Abbey (France)	unknown	4	– (Note: Gelasius II was accompanied by 4 cardinal-bishops to France, where Gelasius died. The 4 cardinals elected his chosen successor. This marks the first election and coronation of a pope far away from Rome, and confirms the 1059 provision that a small number of cardinals could elect a pope under special circumstances.)	
1124 papal election	Pope Honorius II	San Pancrazio (Rome)	unknown	–	1 day (Note: Following the death of Callixtus, the Pierleoni and Frangipani families fought over the papal election. The cardinals initially elected Celestine II (not to be confused with the later pope Celestine II), but under duress by the Frangipani renounced his election, and the Frangipani-supported Honorius II was chosen by acclaim. Honoris then renounced this irregular acclamation, and was elected using the proper procedure the next day, after the remaining electors had been either bought off or threatened by Frangipani forces.)	
1130 papal election	Pope Innocent II	Santi Andrea e Gregorio (Rome)	unknown	–	– (Note: Innocent II was elected by a small group of cardinals supporting Haimeric, the cardinal instrumental in the election of Honorius.)	
1130 papal election	Antipope Anacletus II	San Marco (Rome)	unknown	41	– (Note: Anacletus was chosen by a majority of the 41 cardinals opposed to Haimeric. This marks a departure from the previous election under the 1059 rules, in which only the cardinal-bishops were eligible to vote. Despite Anacletus' stronger support among the cardinals, he failed to be recognized by the northern European monarchs, and died before his opponent innocent. Anacletus successor Victor submitted to Innocent within a year of his election, both have since been considered antipopes.)	
1143 papal election	Pope Celestine II	Basilica of St. John Lateran (Rome)	unknown	–	– (Note: elected "entirely consistent with the decree of 1059". Unclear if that means that only the small group of cardinal-bishops voted or the entire College of Cardinals.)	
1144 papal election	Pope Lucius II	(Rome)	unknown	–	–	
1145 papal election	Pope Eugene III	San Cesareo in Palatio (Rome)	unknown	43	1 day (Note: elected unanimously)	
1153 papal election	Pope Anastasius IV	(Rome)	unknown	–	–	
1154 papal election	Pope Adrian IV	Old St. Peter's Basilica (Rome)	unknown	–	1 day (Note: elected unanimously)	
1159 papal election	Pope Alexander III	Old St. Peter's Basilica (Rome)	unknown	– (Note: Alexander III received a majority of votes which was opposed by at least 5 other cardinals that went on to elect Victor IV as antipope. His electorate probably numbered around the 40, based on the preceding elections.)	–	
1159 papal election	Antipope Victor IV	Old St. Peter's Basilica (Rome)	5* (Note: Victor IV was chosen by a group of five cardinals loyal to the Holy Roman Emperor who objected to the election of Alexander III.)	5	1 day (Note: elected unanimously)	
1181 papal election	Pope Lucius III	(Rome)	unknown	– (Note: The first conclave following the Third Lateran Council, which declared that all cardinals, not just the 6 (previously 7) cardinal-bishops were eligible to elect the pope. This had already been the de facto practice during some conclaves of the previous decades. Because Lucius III was chosen unanimously, the new rules requiring a two-thirds majority did not come into play yet.)	1 day (Note: elected unanimously)	
1185 papal election	Pope Urban III	(Verona)	unknown	11	–	
October 1187 papal election	Pope Gregory VIII	(Ferrara)	unknown	–	1 day (Note: elected unanimously)	
December 1187 papal election	Pope Clement III	(Pisa)	unknown	8	1 day (Note: elected unanimously)	
1191 papal election	Pope Celestine III	(Rome)	31	31	–	
1198 papal election	Pope Innocent III	Septizodium (Rome)	–	21	2 ballots (Note: elected unanimously)	
1216 papal election	Pope Honorius III	Palazzo delle Canoniche (Perugia)	–	2 (Note: Innocent III died accompanied by only two other cardinals. The rest of the college tasked them with deciding on his successor, with one of the two being chosen, presumably without a formal vote taking place between the two.)	– (Note: presumably one day)	
1227 papal election	Pope Gregory IX	Septizodium (Rome)	–	18 (Note: The 18 cardinals tasked three of them with finding a candidate, the first refused and the second was chosen, it is unclear if a formal vote took place.)	–	
1241 papal election	Pope Celestine IV	Septizodium (Rome)	12	10 (9 after one died) (Note: Two cardinals had been captured by Emperor Frederick II. Because the electors were locked in while voting this can be considered the first conclave, though this did not become standard practice for another 3 decades. Celestine IV died 17 days into his pontificate, and the it took almost a year and a half for the cardinals to come together for the next conclave.)	–	
1243 papal election	Pope Innocent IV	(Anagni)	10	8 (Note: Two of the cardinals were still captured, one died during the previous conclave, the other became Celestine IV and died.)	–	
1254 papal election	Pope Alexander IV	(Naples)	18	10	2 days (Note: 11 December 1254 to 12 December 1254)	
1261 papal election	Pope Urban IV	Viterbo Cathedral	8	8	95 days (Note: 26 May 1261 to 29 August 1261)	
1264–1265 papal election	Pope Clement IV	Palazzo delle Canoniche (Perugia)	21	18 or 19 (Note: compare article)	116 days (Note: 12 October 1264 to 5 February 1265)	
1268–1271 papal election	Pope Gregory X	Viterbo Cathedral; Palace of the Popes in Viterbo	20	19 (16 after two died and one left due to illness) (Note: One cardinal was in France and could not participate.)	1006 days (Note: 1 December 1268 to 1 September 1271) at least 137 ballots	
January 1276 conclave	Pope Innocent V	Arezzo Cathedral	–	10	1 day (Note: According to Baumgartner it took only an hour.) 1 ballot	
July 1276 conclave	Pope Adrian V	Basilica of St. John Lateran (Rome)	–	–	14 days	
September 1276 papal election	Pope John XXI	Palace of the Popes in Viterbo	12	9	1 day 1 ballot	
1277 papal election	Pope Nicholas III	Palace of the Popes in Viterbo	7	7	178 days	
1280–1281 papal election	Pope Martin IV	Palace of the Popes in Viterbo	–	13 (12 after one was imprisoned by a mob)	–	
1285 papal election	Pope Honorius IV	Palazzo delle Canoniche (Perugia)	18	15	–	
1287–1288 papal election	Pope Nicholas IV	Santa Sabina (Rome)	15	15 (9 after 6 died during an extremely hot summer)	–	
1292–1294 papal election	Pope Celestine V	Basilica of St. Mary Major (Rome); Santa Maria sopra Minerva (Rome); Palazzo delle Canoniche (Perugia)	–	10 (9 after one died, three others eventually left, leaving 6 who picked Celestine V, though the other 3 were recalled to consent)	–	
1294 conclave	Pope Boniface VIII	Castel Nuovo (Naples)	–	–	1 day (Note: The 1294 conclave is the first of which contemporary documents describing the process survive) 3 ballots	
1303 conclave	Pope Benedict XI	Basilica of St. John Lateran (Rome)	–	–	1 day (Note: elected unanimously) 1 ballot	
1304–1305 conclave	Pope Clement V	Perugia Cathedral (Perugia)	–	19 (15 after four left due to illness)	–	
1314–1316 conclave	Pope John XXII	Carpentras Cathedral; Dominican house in Lyon	–	23	–	
1334 conclave	Pope Benedict XII	Palais des Papes (Avignon)	–	24	–	
1342 conclave	Pope Clement VI	Palais des Papes (Avignon)	–	19	4 days (Note: elected unanimously)	
1352 conclave	Pope Innocent VI	Palais des Papes (Avignon)	28	25	2 days	
1362 conclave	Pope Urban V	Palais des Papes (Avignon)	–	20	7 days (Note: 22 September 1362 to 28 September 1362. Clement VI's brother was elected on the first day but refused the office on health grounds.)	
1370 conclave	Pope Gregory XI	Palais des Papes (Avignon)	–	19	– (Note: After receiving the votes of all 15 French cardinals, Gregory IX, nephew of Clement VI, was elected unanimously on the next ballot.)	
1378 conclave	Pope Urban VI	Old St. Peter's Basilica (Rome)	22	16 (Note: 7 April 1378 to . 6 cardinals stayed in Avignon. Among those cardinals in Rome 11 were French, 4 Italian and 1 Spanish. A large roman mob surrounded the Vatican palace during the conclave, putting the cardinals under pressure to elect a Roman, or at least Italian, pope.)	– (Note: Elected unanimously.)	
1378 Avignon conclave	Antipope Clement VII	(Fondi)	22	21	– (Note: Urban VI antagonized the cardinals so much that they declared the papacy vacant and proceeded to elected a new pope in Avignon. Urban had the support of the Roman populace and created new cardinals loyal to him. For the next 4 decades the papacy was split between Rome and Avignon.)	
1389 conclave	Pope Boniface IX	Apostolic Palace (Rome)	–	21	– (Note: Elected unanimously.)	
1394 Avignon conclave	Antipope Benedict XIII	Palais des Papes (Avignon)	–	14	– (Note: Elected unanimously, excluding Benedict himself, who at first refused the throne but the acquiesced.)	
1404 conclave	Pope Innocent VII	(Rome)	–	–	–	
1406 conclave	Pope Gregory XII	(Rome)	–	–	–	
1409 Council of Pisa	Antipope Alexander V	(Pisa)	–	26	11 days (Note: Elected unanimously.)	
1410 Pisan conclave	Antipope John XXIII	San Petronio Basilica (Bologna)	–	17	3 days (Note: Elected unanimously.)	
1417 Council of Constance	Pope Martin V	Konstanz Minster	31 (cardinals) (Note: The Council of Constance instituted a maximum limit of 24 cardinals. Since Martin V recognized all the cardinals appointed by the various Antipopes, that number was only reached by 1426.)	23 (53 including 30 prelates)	2 days (Note: 8 November 1417 to 9 November 1417. Cardinal Colonna received 15 votes on the second ballot, one short of the required two thirds majority. He was then selected by accession, unanimously.) 2 ballots	
1423 Avignon conclave	Antipope Clement VIII	(Peñíscola)	–	–	– (Note: After Clements death, a single die-hard cardinal elected a successor named Benedict XIV, who died in 1447.)	
1431 conclave	Pope Eugene IV	Santa Maria sopra Minerva (Rome)	20	19	–	
1439 Council of Florence	Antipope Felix V	Basel Münster	–	32 (among them only 1 cardinal)	–	
1447 conclave	Pope Nicholas V	Santa Maria sopra Minerva (Rome)	24	18	3 ballots	
1455 conclave	Pope Callixtus III	Apostolic Palace (Rome)	20	15	–	
1458 conclave	Pope Pius II	Apostolic Palace (Rome)	–	18 (the favorite, Domenico Capranica, Cardinal of Fermo died shortly before the start of the conclave) (Note: This was the last conclave until 1958 in which non-Italians were a majority of the electorate.)	4 days (Note: Elected by accession after the second ballot. The first ballot was held on the third day of the conclave.) 2 ballots	
1464 conclave	Pope Paul II	Apostolic Palace (Rome)	–	20	1 day 1 ballot (Note: Elected by acclamation after the first ballot.)	
1471 conclave	Pope Sixtus IV	Apostolic Palace (Rome)	–	18 (2 in pectore cardinals were not admitted to the conclave)	3 days 3 ballots	
1484 conclave	Pope Innocent VIII	Apostolic Palace (Rome), Sistine Chapel	25	25	–	
1492 conclave	Pope Alexander VI	Apostolic Palace (Rome), Sistine Chapel	23	19	4 days (Note: The vote was unanimous, with Borgia voting for himself.)	
September 1503 conclave	Pope Pius III	Apostolic Palace (Rome)	45 or 47	39 (list) (Note: This represents the largest group of cardinal-electors since the creation of the papal conclave. (Baumgartner, p. 87) (Ignoring some aberrations in the 12th century before the conclave format was fully established))	2 days (Note: 16 September 1503 – 22 September 1503) 2 ballots	
October 1503 conclave	Pope Julius II	Apostolic Palace (Rome)	44	38 (list)	1 day (Note: 10 hours, according to Baumgartner) 1 ballot (Note: The vote was unanimous, except for the future pope, who did not vote for himself.)	
1513 conclave	Pope Leo X	Apostolic Palace (Rome), Niccoline Chapel	31	25	2 days	
1521–1522 conclave	Pope Adrian VI	Apostolic Palace (Rome)	49	39	11 days (Note: 30 December 1521 to 9 January 1522, one vote per day, with the final accession vote on the same day as the 11th scrutiny) 12 ballots	
1523 conclave	Pope Clement VII	Apostolic Palace (Rome)	41	38	48 days (Note: 1 October 1523 to 18 November 1523, the first scrutiny was held on 6 October.)	
1534 conclave	Pope Paul III	Apostolic Palace (Rome), Cappella Parva	–	35	3 days (Note: 11 October 1534 to 13 October 1534, but no voting took place on the 11th.) 2 ballots	
1549–1550 conclave	Pope Julius III	Apostolic Palace (Rome), Cappella Paolina	54	49 (down to 45 at the end, including one death)	72 days (Note: 29 November 1549 (19 days after Paull III death on 10 November) to 8 February 1550) 61 ballots	
April 1555 conclave	Pope Marcellus II	Apostolic Palace (Rome)	57	40 (37 at the beginning)	5 days (Note: Proclamation by adoration, followed by a unanimous ballot. The future Marcellus II voted for Cardinal Carafa, beginning a tradition of all-but-certain candidates casting their own vote for the dean of the college of cardinals.) 2 ballots	
May 1555 conclave	Pope Paul IV	Apostolic Palace (Rome)	56	45 (43 at the beginning)	9 days 3 ballots (Note: Unanimously elected by acclamation)	
1559 conclave	Pope Pius IV	Apostolic Palace (Rome), Cappella Paolina	55	48 (40 at the beginning. 51 participated in total, but because of illness no more than 48 ever voted at once. 2 died during conclave.)	103 days (Note: Not elected unanimously but by a close ballot)	
1565–1566 conclave	Pope Pius V	Apostolic Palace (Rome)	–	53 (48 at the beginning)	20 days (Note: appointed by unanimous acclamation)	
1572 conclave	Pope Gregory XIII	Apostolic Palace (Rome)	–	51	2 days (Note: Elected by acclamation on the first day, confirmed by a unanimous ballot on the second.)	
1585 conclave	Pope Sixtus V	Apostolic Palace (Rome)	–	42	3 days 3 ballots (Note: The vote was unanimous, except for the future pope, who did not vote for himself.)	
September 1590 conclave	Pope Urban VII	Apostolic Palace (Rome)	67 (of a possible 70 (Note: Sixtus V. fixed the size of the college at a maximum of 70 in 1586, a statute that would last until 1958. Any promotion that would exceed the limit was deemed invalid. Often the college had fewer members. The number of cardinal-bishops was lowered from seven to six, that of cardinal-priests increased from 28 to 50, and that of cardinal-deacons lowered from 18 to 14.))	54	7 days	
October–December 1590 conclave	Pope Gregory XIV	Apostolic Palace (Rome)	65 (Note: Urban and one other cardinal died, everyone else was still in Rome)	52 (Note: Urban and one other cardinal died, everyone else was still in Rome)	61 days (Note: 7 October 1590 to 5 December 1590)	
1591 conclave	Pope Innocent IX	Apostolic Palace (Rome)	–	56	3 days 3 ballots (Note: Election was not unanimous)	
1592 conclave	Pope Clement VIII	Apostolic Palace (Rome)	–	51 (52 entered, 2 died and one latecomer was admitted)	21 days (Note: elected unanimously)	
March–April 1605 conclave	Pope Leo XI	Apostolic Palace (Rome)	69	61 (list)	19 days (Note: 14 March 1605 – 1 April 1605)	
May 1605 conclave	Pope Paul V	Apostolic Palace (Rome)	67	59 (list) (Note: Leo XI and Cardinal Girolamo Agucchi both died, reducing the number of cardinals by two.)	9 days (Note: 8 May 1605 to 16 May 1605)	
1621 conclave	Pope Gregory XV	Apostolic Palace (Rome)	69 or 70	58	2 days (Note: 8 February 1621 to 9 February 1621) 1 ballot (Note: Gregory was elected by acclamation after the front-runner of the first and only ballot, Robert Bellarmine declined the position.)	
1623 conclave	Pope Urban VIII	Apostolic Palace (Rome)	–	54	19 days (Note: 19 July 1623 to 6 August 1623)	
1644 conclave	Pope Innocent X	Apostolic Palace (Rome)				
1655 conclave	Pope Alexander VII	Apostolic Palace (Rome)				
1667 conclave	Pope Clement IX	Apostolic Palace (Rome)				
1669–1670 conclave	Pope Clement X	Apostolic Palace (Rome)			(Note: No conclave between 1667 and 1830 lasted for fewer than three weeks.)	
1676 conclave	Pope Innocent XI	Apostolic Palace (Rome)				
1689 conclave	Pope Alexander VIII	Apostolic Palace (Rome)				
1691 conclave	Pope Innocent XII	Apostolic Palace (Rome)				
1700 conclave	Pope Clement XI	Apostolic Palace (Rome)				
1721 conclave	Pope Innocent XIII	Apostolic Palace (Rome)				
1724 conclave	Pope Benedict XIII	Apostolic Palace (Rome)				
1730 conclave	Pope Clement XII	Apostolic Palace (Rome)				
1740 conclave	Pope Benedict XIV	Apostolic Palace (Rome)				
1758 conclave	Pope Clement XIII	Apostolic Palace (Rome)				
1769 conclave	Pope Clement XIV	Apostolic Palace (Rome)				
1774–1775 conclave	Pope Pius VI	Apostolic Palace (Rome)				
1799–1800 conclave	Pope Pius VII	San Giorgio Monastery (Venice)	45	35	105 days (Note: 30 November 1799 to 14 March 1800)	
1823 conclave	Pope Leo XII	Quirinal Palace (Rome)	53	49	27 days (Note: 2 September 1823 to 28 September 1823)	
1829 conclave	Pope Pius VIII	Quirinal Palace (Rome)	58	50	36 days (Note: 24 February 1829 to 31 March 1829)	
1830–1831 conclave	Pope Gregory XVI	Quirinal Palace (Rome)	54	45	51 days (Note: 14 December 1830 to 2 February 1831. No conclave since has lasted for more than one week or taken more than 14 ballots.) 83 ballots	
1846 conclave	Pope Pius IX	Quirinal Palace (Rome)	62	50	3 days (Note: 14 June 1846 to 16 June 1846) 4 ballots	
1878 conclave	Pope Leo XIII	Apostolic Palace (Rome), Sistine Chapel	64	61	3 days (Note: 18 February 1878 to 20 February 1878) 3 ballots	
1903 conclave	Pope Pius X	Apostolic Palace (Rome), Sistine Chapel	64	62 (list)	5 days (Note: 31 July 1903 to 4 August 1903) 7 ballots	
1914 conclave	Pope Benedict XV	Apostolic Palace (Rome), Sistine Chapel	65	57 (list)	4 days (Note: 31 August 1914 to 3 September 1914) 10 ballots	
1922 conclave	Pope Pius XI	Apostolic Palace (Rome), Sistine Chapel	60	53 (list)	5 days (Note: 2 February 1922 to 6 February 1922) 14 ballots	
1939 conclave	Pope Pius XII	Apostolic Palace (Vatican City), Sistine Chapel	62	62 (list)	2 days (Note: 1 March 1939 to 2 March 1939) 3 ballots	
1958 conclave	Pope John XXIII	Apostolic Palace (Vatican City), Sistine Chapel	53	51 (list)	4 days (Note: 25 October 1958 to 28 October 1958) 11 ballots	
1963 conclave	Pope Paul VI	Apostolic Palace (Vatican City), Sistine Chapel	82	80 (list)	3 days (Note: 19 June 1963 to 21 June 1963) 6 ballots	
August 1978 conclave	Pope John Paul I	Apostolic Palace (Vatican City), Sistine Chapel	114	111 (list)	2 days (Note: 25 August 1978 to 26 August 1978) 4 ballots	
October 1978 conclave	Pope John Paul II	Apostolic Palace (Vatican City), Sistine Chapel	111	111 (list)	3 days (Note: 14 October 1978 to 16 October 1978) 8 ballots	
2005 conclave	Pope Benedict XVI	Apostolic Palace (Vatican City), Sistine Chapel	117	115 (list)	2 days (Note: 18 April 2005 to 19 April 2005) 4 ballots	
2013 conclave	Pope Francis	Apostolic Palace (Vatican City), Sistine Chapel	117	115 (list)	2 days (Note: 12 March 2013 to 13 March 2013) 5 ballots	
2025 conclave	Pope Leo XIV	Apostolic Palace (Vatican City), Sistine Chapel	135	133 (list)	2 days (Note: 7 May 2025 to 8 May 2025) 4 ballots	

== See also ==
- Conclave
- List of current cardinals

== Literature ==
- Baumgartner, Frederic J. (2003). Behind Locked Doors: A History of the Papal Elections. Palgrave Macmillan. ISBN 0-312-29463-8.
