= July 1276 conclave =

Election of Catholic Pope Adrian V

Papal conclave July 1276

Dates and location
- July 1276; Archbasilica of St. John Lateran, Rome

Key officials
- Protopriest: Simone Paltineri
- Protodeacon: Riccardo Annibaldi

Elected pope
- Ottobuono Fieschi; Name taken: Adrian V
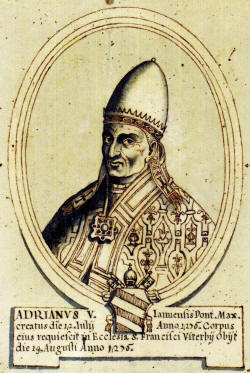

A papal conclave was held from 2–11 July 1276 to elect a new pope to succeed Pope Innocent V who had died suddenly. Following the nine-day conclave, Ottobuono Fieschi, the Cardinal-Deacon of Sant'Adriano al Foro, was elected to succeed him.

It was the second of three papal elections in 1276 following the conclave of 21–22 January and preceding the election in September.

== Background ==
Pope Gregory X died on 10 January 1276 following a period of ill health. During his papacy, Gregory had established Ubi periculum to speed up papal elections. As a result, the subsequent conclave of 21–22 January 1276 would be the first held under these rules. Of the 13 cardinals present, Pierre de Tarentaise, the Cardinal-Bishop of Ostia e Velletri was elected as Pope Innocent V. His papacy was shortlived as he died five months later on 22 June 1276.

== Election of Pope Adrian V ==
Of the 14 cardinals, 13 were present at the conclave. Only Simon de Brion, Cardinal-Priest of Santa Cecilia, was absent from the conclave.

Present were :

- João Pedro Julião, Cardinal-Bishop of Frascati;
- Vicedominus de Vicedominis, Cardinal-Bishop of Palestrina;
- Bertrand de Saint-Martin, Cardinal-Bishop of Sabina;
- Simone Paltanieri, Cardinal-Priest of SS. Silvestro e Martino;
- Ancher Pantaleon, Cardinal-Priest of S. Prassede;
- Guillaume de Bray, Cardinal-Priest of S. Marco;
- Riccardo Annibaldi, Cardinal-Deacon of S. Angelo in Pescheria;
- Giovanni Gaetano Orsini, Cardinal-Deacon of S. Nicola in Carcere Tulliano;
- Ottobono Fieschi, Cardinal-Deacon of S. Adriano;
- Giacomo Savelli, Cardinal-Deacon of S. Maria in Cosmedin;
- Goffredo da Alatri, Cardinal-Deacon of S. Giorgio in Velabro;
- Uberto Coconati, Cardinal-Deacon of S. Eustachio;
- Matteo Rosso Orsini, Cardinal-Deacon of S. Maria in Portico.

After nine days, Ottobuono Fieschi was elected as Pope Adrian V.

== Aftermath ==
Adrian V's papacy was even shorter than his predecessor's at just 38 days after he died on 18 August 1276. A subsequent election, the third in the year, was held in September 1276 to elect Pope John XXI.
