= 1276 papal conclave =

1276 papal conclave or 1276 papal election may refer to:

- January 1276 papal conclave, which elected Innocent V to succeed Gregory X
- July 1276 papal conclave, which elected Adrian V to succeed Innocent V
- September 1276 papal election, which elected John XXI to succeed Adrian V
