= January 1276 conclave =

Election of Catholic Pope Innocent V

Papal conclave January 1276

Dates and location
- 21–22 January 1276; San Domenico's Basilica, Arezzo

Key officials
- Protopriest: Simone Paltineri
- Protodeacon: Riccardo Annibaldi

Election
- Ballots: 1

Elected pope
- Pierre de Tarentaise; Name taken: Innocent V
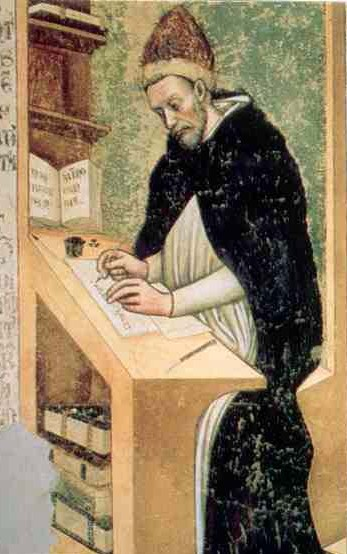

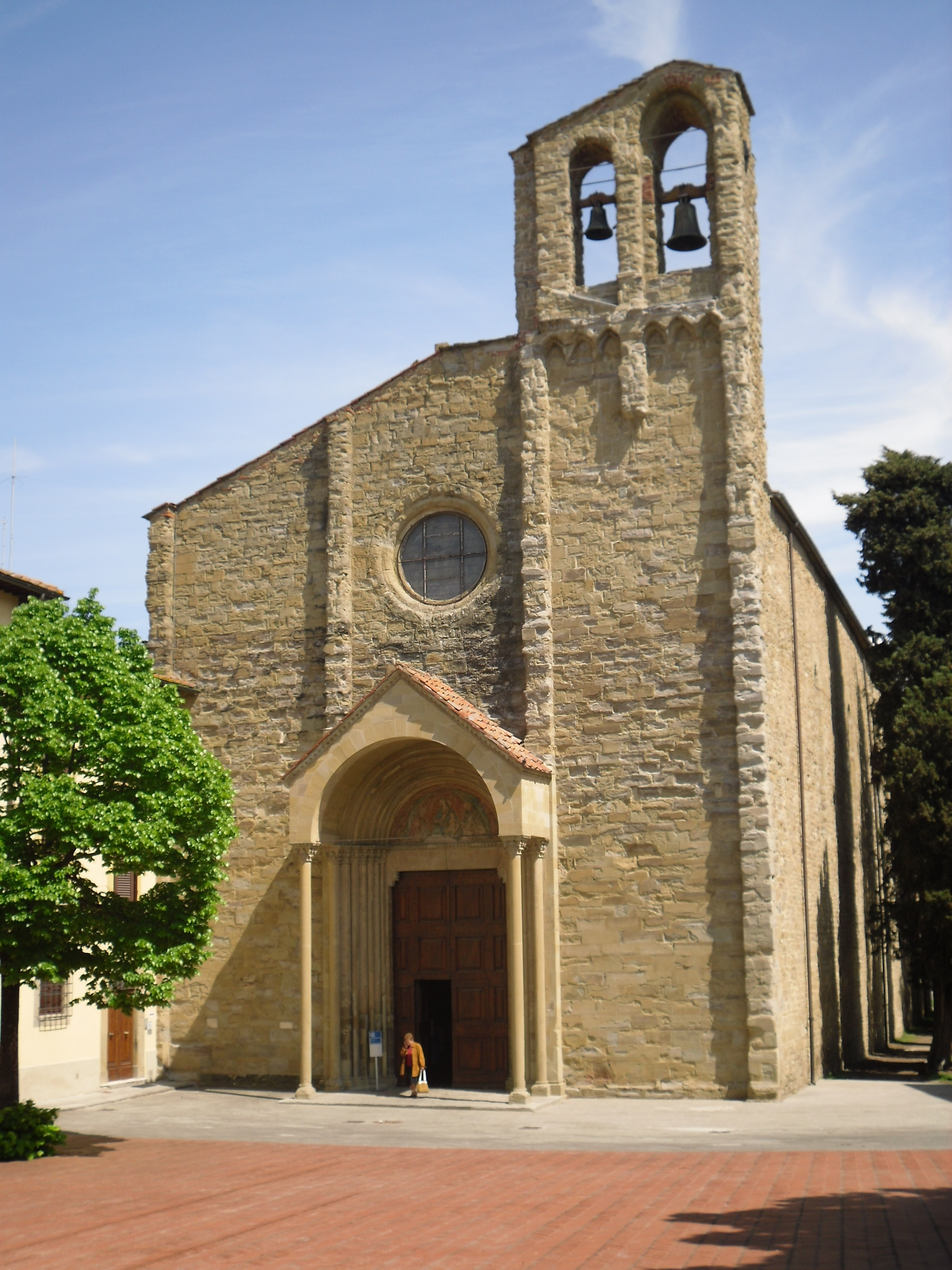
San Domenico's Basilica in Arezzo

A conclave was held from 21 to 22 January 1276 to elect the successor of Pope Gregory X, who succumbed to illness on the return from the Second Ecumenical Council of Lyon. During the two day conclave, the Dominican friar and cardinal Peter of Tarentaise, bishop of Ostia, was elected pope and took the name Innocent V.

It was the first conclave held under the rules of constitution Ubi periculum, issued by Pope Gregory X in 1274, which established papal conclaves. According to Ubi periculum cardinals were to be secluded in a closed area; they were not even accorded separate rooms. No cardinal was allowed to be attended by more than one servant unless ill. Food was to be supplied through a window; after three days of the meeting, the cardinals were to receive only one dish a day; after five days, they were to receive just bread and water. During the conclave, no cardinal was to receive any ecclesiastical revenue. These provisions were regularly disregarded, at the discretion of the cardinals, particularly the requirement of being incommunicado.

Although several times before papal elections were held in the circumstances similar to those described by Ubi periculum, for the first time such situation was formally required by a papal Constitution. For this reason, the conclave of January 1276 can be considered the first conclave in history in the strictly legal sense of this word.

== List of participants ==
Pope Gregory X died on January 10, 1276, at Arezzo. At the time of his death there were probably 15 cardinals in the Sacred College, but only 13 of them participated in the subsequent conclave. Seven of them were created by Urban IV, four by Gregory X and one by Gregory IX:

Elector	Cardinalatial title	Elevated	Appointed by	Other ecclesiastical titles	Notes
Pierre de Tarentaise, O.P.	Bishop of Ostia e Velletri	June 3, 1273	Gregory X	Grand penitentiary	Elected Pope Innocent V
João Pedro Julião	Bishop of Frascati	June 3, 1273	Gregory X		Future Pope John XXI
Vicedominus de Vicedominis	Bishop of Palestrina	June 3, 1273	Gregory X		Nephew of Pope Gregory X
Bertrand de Saint-Martin, O.S.B.	Bishop of Sabina	June 3, 1273	Gregory X		
Simone Paltanieri	Priest of SS. Silvestro e Martino	December 17, 1261	Urban IV	Protopriest	
Ancher Pantaleon	Priest of S. Prassede	May 1262	Urban IV		
Guillaume de Bray	Priest of S. Marco	May 1262	Urban IV		
Riccardo Annibaldi	Deacon of S. Angelo in Pescheria	1238	Gregory IX	Protodeacon; Archpriest of the patriarchal Vatican Basilica; Protector of the Order of Augustinians	nephew of Pope Innocent III
Ottobono Fieschi	Deacon of S. Adriano	December, 1251	Innocent IV	Archpriest of the patriarchal Liberian Basilica	future Pope Adrian V
Uberto Coconati	Deacon of S. Eustachio	December 17, 1261	Urban IV		
Giacomo Savelli	Deacon of S. Maria in Cosmedin	December 17, 1261	Urban IV		Future Pope Honorius IV
Goffredo da Alatri	Deacon of S. Giorgio in Velabro	December 17, 1261	Urban IV		
Matteo Rosso Orsini	Deacon of S. Maria in Portico	May 1262	Urban IV		Nephew of Pope Nicholas III

== Absentee cardinals ==
Two cardinals were absent, including one created by Urban IV and one created by Innocent IV:

Elector	Cardinalatial title	Elevated	Appointed by	Other ecclesiastical titles	Notes
Simon Monpitie de Brie	Priest of S. Cecilia	December 17, 1261	Urban IV	Papal Legate in the Kingdom of France	Future Pope Martin IV
Giovanni Gaetano Orsini	Deacon of S. Nicola in Carcere Tulliano	May 28, 1244	Innocent IV	Inquisitor General; Protector of the Order of Franciscans	Future Pope Nicholas III

== Conclave. Election of Pope Innocent V ==
On January 20, 10 days after the death of Gregory X, 15 cardinals assembled in the episcopal palace in Arezzo. In the first scrutiny on the following day they unanimously elected French Cardinal Pierre de Tarentaise, bishop of Ostia e Velletri, who took the name of Innocent V. He was the first Dominican pope.
