= Guillaume de Bray =

French cardinal, poet and mathematician (died 1282)

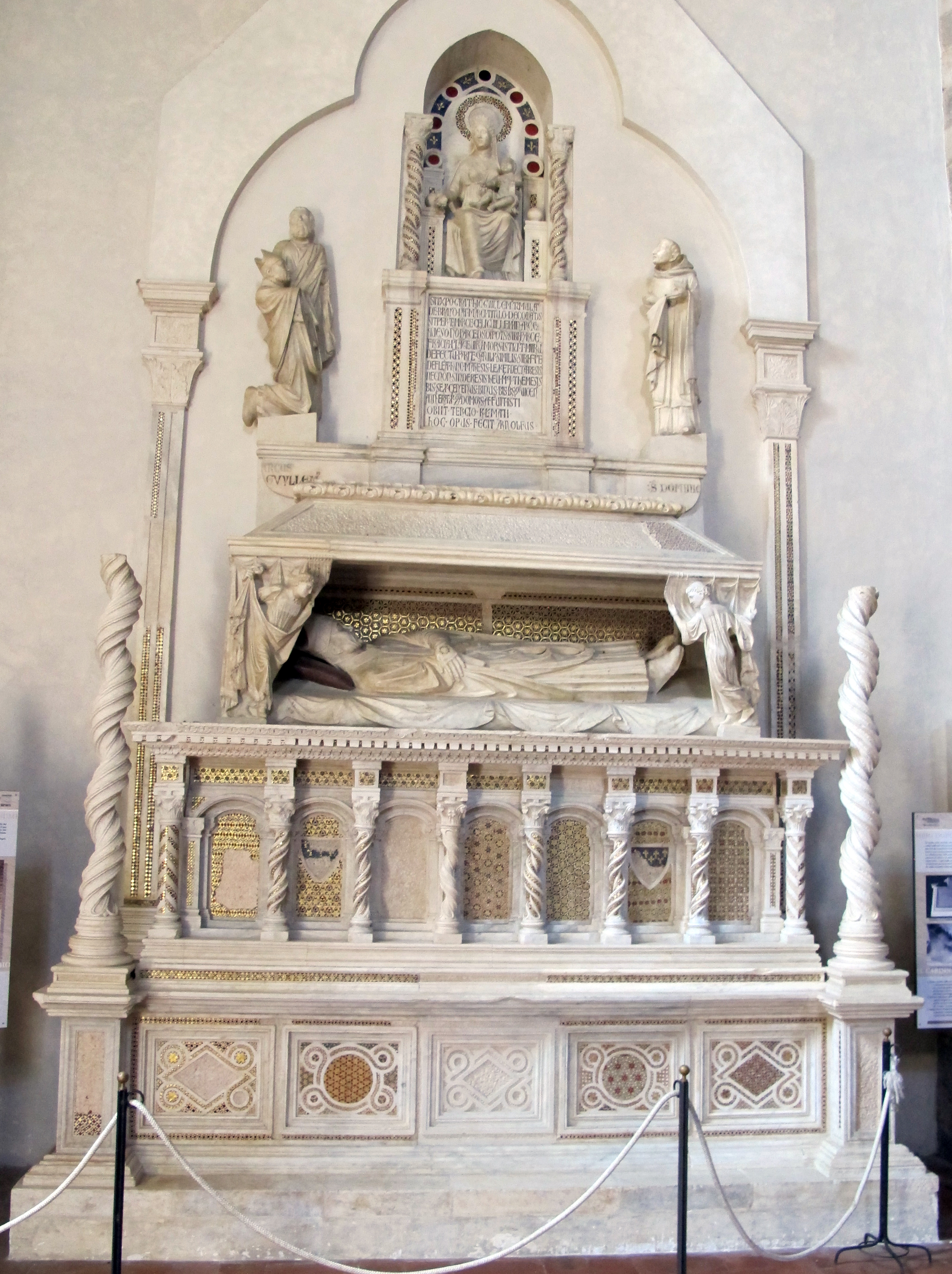
Monument of Cardinal de Bray, Orvieto, San Domenico

Guillaume de Bray (born at Bray in the Ile-de-France, date unknown; died in Orvieto, 29 April 1282) was a French ecclesiastic and Roman Catholic Cardinal, poet, and mathematician.

It is claimed Guillaume was Master of Theology, but the Cardinal's tombstone indicates that he was learned in Canon and Civil Law. There is no reference to him ever having been a Papal Legate, a Nuncio, or a provincial Rector (governor). So far as it is known, his career as a cardinal was entirely inside the Roman Curia.

His earliest known office was that of Archdeacon of the Church of Reims. He was already Archdeacon when he appears as Dean of the Cathedral of Laon (ca. 1250-1262).

== Reign of Urban IV (1261-1264) ==
He was created a cardinal-priest by Pope Urban IV in a consistory held at Viterbo on 22 May 1262. The reasons for his creation are completely unknown. He was assigned the Titulus of the Church of S. Marco in Rome, though the French Urban IV himself (Jacques Pantaléon of Troyes in Champagne) never visited Rome once during his reign. Cardinal Guillaume's earliest subscription on a papal document was on 9 January 1263.

Pope Urban died at Perugia on 2 October 1264, where he had taken refuge from an insurrection against him in Orvieto. The papal throne was vacant for seventeen weeks.

== Reign of Clement IV (1265-1268) ==
Cardinal Guillaume was one of eighteen or nineteen cardinals who participated in the papal election that took place in Perugia in the Episcopal Palace. Their choice was between a supporter of the Imperial party (Manfred) or the Angevin party (Charles of Anjou). A canonical election seems to have taken place in October, 1264, but the successful candidate was not present in Perugia. Cardinal Guy Folques (Fulcoldi) was in northern France. He had been appointed Apostolic Legate to England, with powers to intervene in the baronial war between King Henry III and Simon de Montfort, but his entry into England had been blocked. He did not reach Perugia to accept the papal throne until 5 February 1265.

On 16 June 1265, Cardinal Guillaume of S. Marco subscribed a papal bull in favor of the Monastery of S. Maria in Donnico and similarly on 7 July 1265, for the Monastery of Fructuensis, and on 1 August 1265, for the Monastery of S. Gertrude in Cologne.

At Perugia on 21 May 1265, Pope Clement IV confirmed a judgment made by Cardinal Guillaume of S. Marco and Cardinal Ottavio Ubaldini of S. Maria in Via lata, on a dispute involving members of the Roman Curia and the townspeople of Perugia regarding the paying of rents for domiciles when they were absent from the Curia or when no audiences were being held.

On 4 February 1266, Cardinal Guillaume subscribed a bull in favor of the Abbey of Cluny. Next day he subscribed a bull in favor of the Hospital of S. Pietro in Prato. In December, 1266, Pope Clement granted Cardinal Guillaume the privilege of disposing of prebendaries in the dioceses of Laon and Reims, which had been granted to Archbishop-elect Jean de Courtenai.

In the summer of 1267, Guillaume de Bray was Auditor (Judge) in the case of a disputed election at the Monastery of S. Pierre de Altovillari in the diocese of Reims; his decision was confirmed by the Pope on 21 August 1267. Pope Clement IV confirmed a judgment of Cardinal Guillaume in favor of the Preceptor of the Knights of the Order of S. John of Jerusalem in Germany against a monastery in the diocese of Constanz on 23 December 1267.

On 5 January 1268, the Pope confirmed a judgment made by Cardinal Odo of Chateauroux and Cardinal Guillaume de Bray in the matter of a contested election for the position of Abbot of a monastery in the diocese of Châlons-sur-Marne.

== The Election of 1268-1271 ==
Pope Clement IV died in Viterbo on 29 November 1268. At his own request he was buried in the Dominican church, S. Maria in Gradi, though his body was transferred, during the Sede Vacante, to the Cathedral of S. Lorenzo. The act was carried out by the Bishop, Archpriest and Canons of the Cathedral, anticipating that popular enthusiasm which began to see miracles at the dead pope's body might lead to a canonization. They preferred that the Cathedral should benefit rather than the Dominicans.

The vacancy in the Holy See lasted two years, nine months and two days. Since the cardinals were absolutely unable to agree on one of themselves as a possible pope, they decided to follow a different sanctioned procedure for electing a pope, called the "Way of Compromise". Each of the cardinals, including Guillaume de Bray, signed a document entrusting the choice of a pope to a committee of six cardinals, providing that five of the six had to agree on the candidate for a successful election. But Cardinal Guillaume was not a member of the Committee of Compromise. After the Election had taken place on September 1, 1271, and an outsider, a non-cardinal had been elected, while the Cardinals were awaiting the arrival of the pope-elect, Teobaldo Visconti, from the Holy Land, on 23 November 1271, they ordered an inquiry into the removal of the Pope's body, and placed Cardinal Guillaume de Bray of S. Marco and Cardinal Uberto de Coconato of S. Eustachio in charge. They ordered that the body and its monument be returned to the Church of S. Maria in Gradi.

== Reign of Gregory X (1272-1276) ==
In 1272, Guillaume de Bray was named Chamberlain of the College of Cardinals.

Under Pope Gregory X, Cardinal Guillaume was named Auditor (judge) in the case of a monastery election in the diocese of Agen; the case was still active on 15 February 1278 under Pope Nicholas III. He was also Auditor in the case of a double election in the diocese of Monopoli after the death of Bishop Giulio.

He was present at the opening ceremonies of the Second Council of Lyon on 1 May 1274. On 6 June 1274, a Consistory was held in Lyons, and Cardinal Guillaume de Bray is listed on a document as one of thirteen cardinals in attendance on that day.

He was one of the cardinals who accompanied Pope Gregory X on his return trip from Lyon in 1275. He was present at Lausanne on 20 October 1275, when the German King Rudolf I of Habsburg swore his oath of fealty to the Roman Church, in anticipation of his being crowned Emperor by the Pope.

== 1276: The Year of Four Popes ==
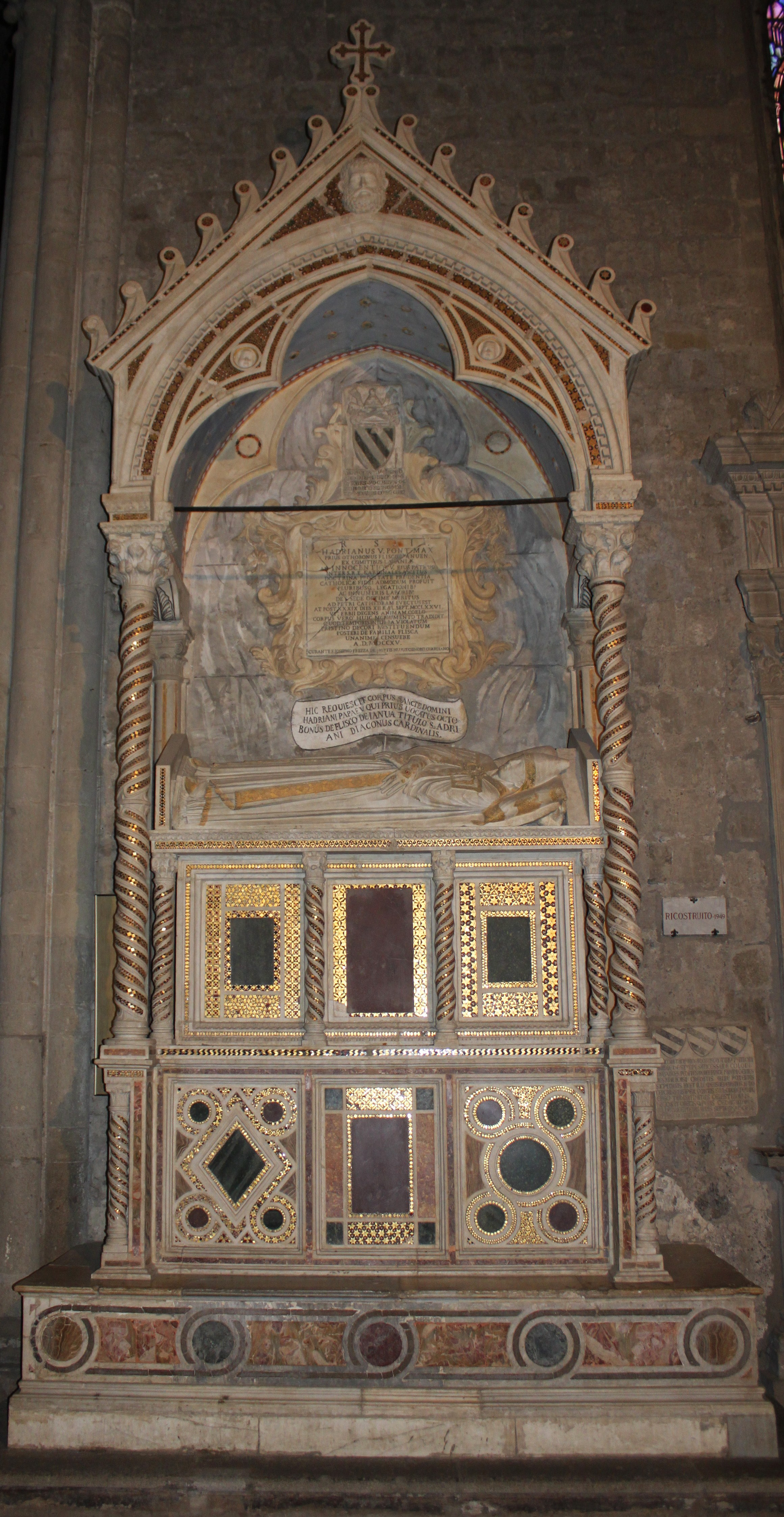
Mausoleum of Adrian V Franciscan Church, Viterbo

Cardinal Guillaume de Bray was one of the twelve (or thirteen) cardinals who participated in the papal Conclave of 20–21 January 1276, at Arezzo, where Gregory X had died, in which Pierre de Tarentaise, OP, of Savoy, was elected and chose the name Innocent V. He was also one of thirteen cardinals who took part in the Conclave of July, 1276, which was held in Rome, where Innocent V had died. The Conclave began on 2 July and concluded on 11 July with the election of Cardinal Ottobono Fieschi of Genoa, who took the name Adrian V. King Charles of Sicily, the Senator of Rome, acted as governor of the Conclave. His administration of the Conclave was exceedingly rigorous, though unfair in his favoring the French faction. It is no surprise that one of his supporters was chosen pope. Adrian immediately ratified the peace treaty which had been worked out by the Genoese (or at least the pro-French Genoese) and King Charles. Ultimately King Charles' manipulations came to nothing, when Adrian died thirty nine-days later, on August 18. Before he died, however, he did one important act. He suspended the papal Constitution "Ubi Periculum", which had been drawn up by Pope Gregory X and ratified by the Second Council of Lyon in 1274. This constitution provided the rules and regulations for the operation of a Conclave. Adrian and the Cardinals agreed that it did not work well, and that it needed revisions. Cardinal Guillaume of S. Marco is specifically mentioned as not having been present, due to illness, at the discussions which lead to the suspension of "Ubi Periculum". Adrian was planning these revisions during a trip to Viterbo when he suddenly died. He had not been ordained, consecrated or crowned. The Conclave of September, 1276, in Viterbo, therefore, was the scene of considerable disorder both in the Roman Curia and in the townspeople. Once the disorders were quelled, the election was quick. The eleven Cardinals who were present agreed on Cardinal Peter of Lisbon, who became Pope John XXII.

Cardinal Guillaume de Bray had been one of the episcopal examiners appointed by Pope Innocent V in the case of the election of Bishop Henri of Therouane, approval of which had been refused by the Archbishop of Reims under Pope Gregory X. An appeal had been lodged with Pope Gregory, and Cardinal Matteo Rosso Orsini had been assigned as Auditor. But Gregory had died in January, 1276, and the opponents to the appeal withdrew their objections, and so Cardinal Guillaume and his colleagues were appointed by Pope Innocent V to proceed to the examination of the election itself and the candidate. Then Innocent V died, and shortly after that Adrian V as well, and it was finally John XXI who accepted the examiners' judgment and ratified the election. On 27 March, 1277, the election of an Archimandrite (Abbot) of the Basilian monastery of Cardona was confirmed by Pope John XXI on the recommendation of a committee of cardinals which included Guillaume of S. Marco.

== Reign of Nicholas III (1277-1281) ==
Cardinal Guillaume de Bray was one of the cardinals who sat in Consistory at S. Peter's on 4 May 1278, when King Rudolf's ambassador, Fr. Conradus, O.Min., publicly ratified the agreements reached between the King and the late Pope Gregory X at Lausanne on 20 October 1275. On 3 February 1279, he was one of nine cardinals who subscribed the new Constitution for the Canons and Beneficiati of S. Peter's Basilica.

On March 12, 1278, Pope Nicholas III (Orsini) created nine new cardinals, most of whom were not of the French or Angevin faction. This was a challenge to King Charles I of Naples, who had been the principal political factor in Roman and Italian politics since 1265. Nicholas manipulated Charles into resigning the Senatorship, which Nicholas took into his own hands. He also required Charles to resign his post as Rector of Tuscany, where the Pope placed two of his nephews instead. This ensured a continuous struggle during Nicholas' reign between Guelfs and Ghibbelines, French and Romans. It furthermore ensured that the future Conclave on his death would pit the Imperial party and French party against each other.

Early in the year 1278, Cardinal Guillaume was a member of a committee of three cardinals who examined the canonical election and the personal character of Arnoldus de Villa, Bishop of Dax. The appointment was approved on their recommendation by Pope Nicholas. A similar case, that of Giovanni Boccamazza, the Archbishop-elect of Monreale (and future cardinal), was handled in the summer of 1278.

On 18 March 1279, he and nine other cardinals subscribed two bulls for the benefit of the Monastery of Cluny, and yet another on 7 May 1279. In the spring of 1279 he sat on a cardinalatial committee that advised the Pope on the disputed election to the See of Sorrento. In September, he was a member of the committee that examined the election of William Wickwane, Archbishop-elect of York; a technical defect in the canonical election was found, and the election overturned. But Pope Nicholas then immediately provided (appointed) William Wickwane as Archbishop anyway.

Another case concerned the Church of Vannes. When Bishop Guy died in October, 1270, the Cathedral Chapter split into two parties and engaged in a double election. Both sides appealed to Pope Gregory X, who appointed an examination committee. The case was still pending when Gregory died, and John XXI appointed another committee, of which Cardinal Guillaume de Bray was a member. But then Pope John died on 20 May 1277, and it was only on 12 December 1279, that the election was settled by Pope Nicholas III.

Early in 1280 Cardinal Guillaume was Auditor (judge) in the case of a disputed election in the monastery of S. Launomarius Blesensis in the Diocese of Chartres.

== Election of Martin IV ==
Pope Nicholas III died at his summer retreat at Soriano near Viterbo on 22 August 1280. Guillaume de Bray was one of thirteen cardinals alive at the time of the Pope's death. His party, the French-Angevin, had sufficient votes to exclude any candidate they considered unfriendly, but the Roman party led by the Orsini was also in the same position. With a two-thirds vote required for a canonical election, a bitter struggle was inevitable. The struggle began in Rome as soon as the death was known, with a revolt against the Orsini faction by a pro-Angevin faction headed by Riccardo Annibaldi. When the revolt failed, the Annibaldi fled the city, but then managed to get the people of Viterbo, where the Conclave was meeting, to revolt against their Podestà (Governor), another Orsini papal nephew named Orso Orsini. Annibaldi became the "Protector of the Conclave", and managed the city for the benefit of the French faction. There were three Orsini cardinals, however, and with only a little support from two or three of their uncle's cardinals, the French faction could get nowhere. That situation continued for some five months.

But suddenly, on 2 February 1281, the Conclave was invaded by a mob led by Riccardo Annibaldi and six of his captains, and the three Orsini cardinals were seized. Cardinal Latino Malabranca Orsini was released, but the other two were hauled off to imprisonment. Three days later, the late Pope's brother, Cardinal Giordano Orsini, was released and allowed to rejoin his colleagues in Conclave. But Cardinal Matteo Rosso Orsini was held until after the Conclave had concluded. Even with this degree of intimidation, though, it took the cardinals to agree on a French candidate, Cardinal Simon de Brion, who had been Papal Legate in France for more than a decade, and who had been the leading figure in bringing Charles of Anjou to Italy in the first place. He chose to be called Martin IV.

He immediately approached the Roman leaders, hoping to be crowned at S. Peter's, according to tradition. He was flatly refused. The Romans wanted nothing to do with the puppet of Charles I and the Annibaldi. He would not be crowned in Viterbo, since the city was under Interdict and Excommunication for their actions against the Cardinals in Conclave. Martin IV and the Papal Curia therefore moved to Orvieto, where he was crowned in the Cathedral of S. Pietro on Sunday, March 23, 1281, and where he resided for the next fifteen months. On June 27, 1284, Martin IV was forced to leave Orvieto because of the hostility of Raynerius, the Captain of the People. On October 4, 1284, he arrived in Perugia, where he died on March 28, 1285.

== Death of Cardinal de Bray ==
Under Martin IV (Simon de Brion), Cardinal Guillaume continued to be appointed to episcopal and abbatial examination committees. Early in 1282, he was one of the examiners of the election of the monk Jacobus de Roma to be abbot of S. Paul's Outside the Walls' but, before the examination was concluded, Jacobus resigned the election, and the Pope appointed Bartholomeo, Abbot of S. Gregorio in Clivo Scauri instead. He was also a member of a committee of cardinals who had been appointed by Pope Nicholas IV to examine the election of an Abbess of the monastery of S. Victorino in Benevento, but then Nicholas died and the examination continued under Martin IV, but Cardinal Guillaume of S. Marco died before the final papal decision, which was given on 23 November 1282.

Cardinal Guillaume de Bray died in Orvieto on 29 April 1282, and was buried in the Church of the Dominicans, with a monument designed by Arnolfo di Cambio, that is his first signed work. The inscription gives the Cardinal credit for mathesis, lex et decreta, and poesis (mathematics, Canon and civil law, poetry).

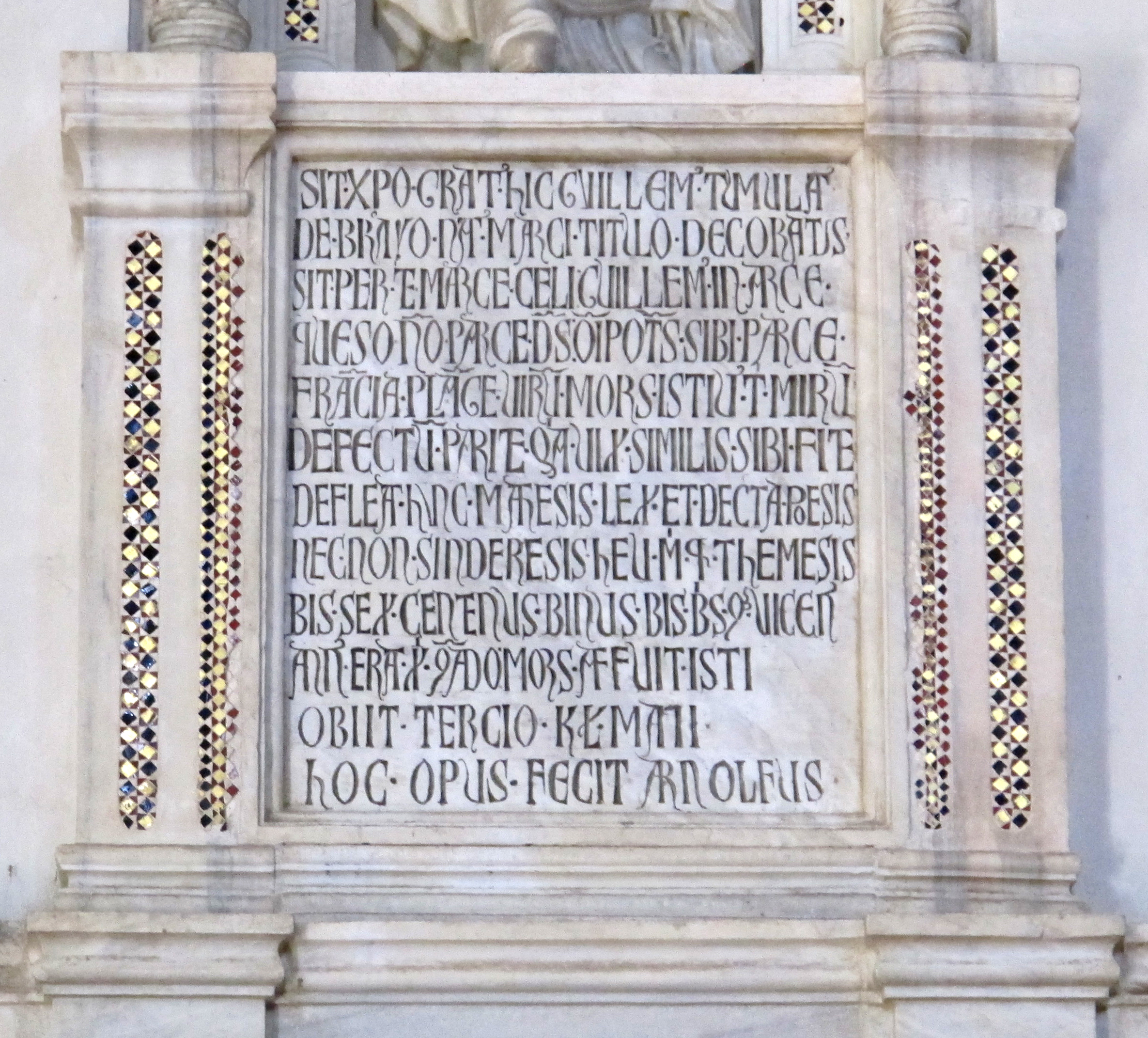
Inscription on Monument of Cardinal de Bray

== Bibliography ==
- Jean Roy, Nouvelle histoire des cardinaux François Tome IV (Paris: Poinçot, 1787). "Guillaume XXIII".
- Lorenzo Cardella, Memorie delle cardinali della Santa Romana Chiesa I, parte 2 (Roma 1792).
- E. Jordan, "Les promotions de cardinaux sous Urbain IV," Revue d' histoire et de littérature religieuses 5 (1900) 322–334.
- Ferdinand Gregorovius, History of the City of Rome in the Middle Ages, Volume V. 2, second edition, revised (London: George Bell, 1906).
- F. Paniconi, Monumento al cardinale Guglielmo De Braye nella chiesa di San Domenico in Orvieto (Roma 1906).
- Agostino Paravicini Bagliani, I Testamenti dei Cardinali del Duecento (Roma: Presso la Società alla Biblioteca Vallicelliana, 1980).
- Antonio Franchi, Il conclave di Viterbo (1268-1271) e le sue origini: saggio con documenti inediti (Assisi: Porziuncola, 1993).
- Gary M. Radke, Viterbo: Profile of a Thirteenth-century Papal Palace (Cambridge University Press 1996).
- Andreas Fischer, Kardinale im Konklave. Die lange Sedisvakanz der Jahre 1268 bis 1271 (Stuttgart: W. de Gruyter-Max Niemeyer 2008) [Bibliothek des Deutschen Historischen Instituts in Rome, 118].
- Arnolfo di Cambio : il monumento del Cardinale Guillaume de Bray dopo il restauro : atti del convegno internazionale di studio "Il monumento del Cardinal Guillaume De Braye di Arnolfo di Cambio dopo il restauro," Roma-Orvieto, 9-11 dicembre 2004 : in ricordo di Angiola Maria Romanini (Roma: Istituto poligrafico e Zecca dello Stato, 2010; Firenze : L.S. Olschki, 2010).
- Vittorio Franchetti Pardo, Arnolfo di Cambio e la sua epoca: costruire, scolpire, dipingere, decorare : atti del convegno internazionale di studi, Firenze-Colle di Val d'Elsa, 7-10 marzo 2006 (Roma: Viella, 2006).
