= September 1276 papal election =

Election of Catholic Pope John XXI

Papal election September 1276

Dates and location
- Palazzo dei Papi di Viterbo

Key officials
- Protopriest: Simone Paltanieri
- Protodeacon: Riccardo Annibaldi

Elected pope
- Pedro Julião; Name taken: John XXI
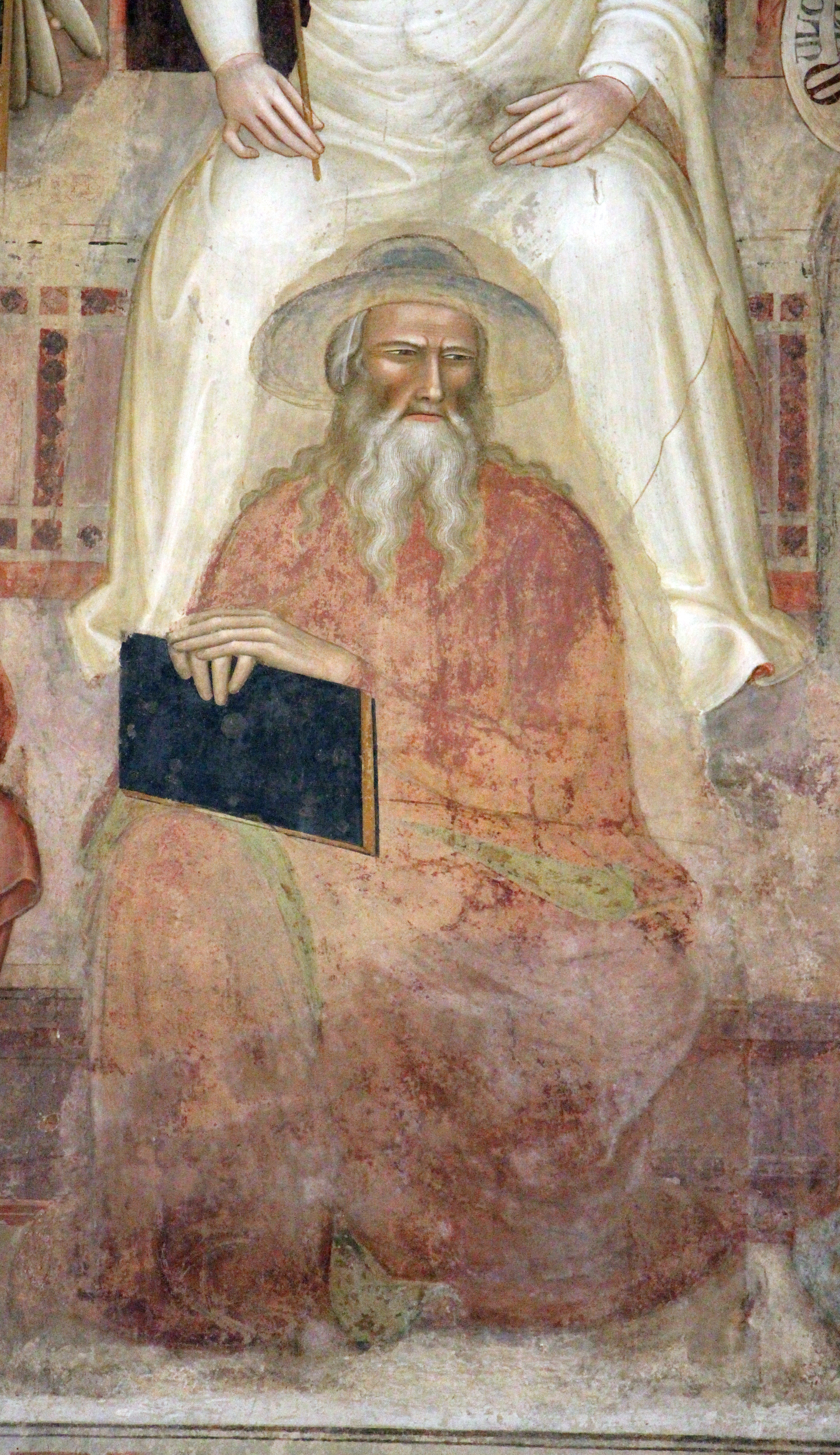

The September 1276 papal election is the only papal election to be the third election held in the same year; after Pope Gregory X died, two successors died that year, requiring yet another election. The election was also the first non-conclave since the establishment of the papal conclave after the 1268–1271 papal election.

== Election of John XXI ==
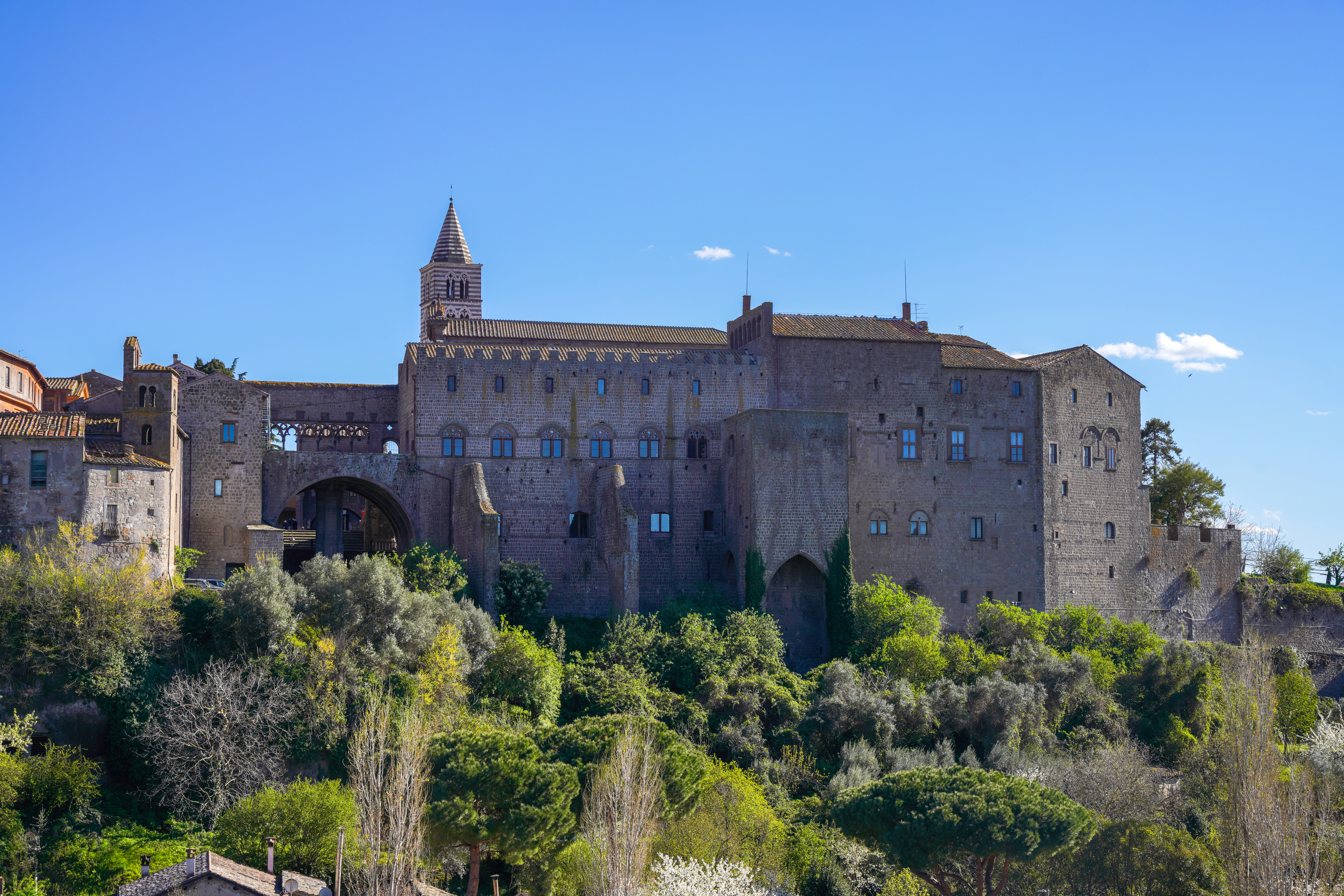
Palazzo dei Papi di Viterbo

Pope Adrian V died on August 18, 1276, at Viterbo after a pontificate of only 38 days without being consecrated. The only act of his pontificate was the suspension of the constitution Ubi periculum about the conclave.

The number of the cardinals present at Viterbo at the death of Adrian V is unclear, but, except for Simon de Brion, who acted as legate in France, at least cardinal Vicedomino de Vicedominis (and perhaps also Riccardo Annibaldi) was absent at Rome due to illness. The rest of the cardinals decided to await on his arrival. Vicedomino joined the electors at the beginning of September, and the electors finally started to proceed. However, the gravely ill Cardinal Vicedomino died on September 6.

The remaining 10 (nine?) electors continued to proceed. They were divided into two national parties: French and Italian. Neither of them had sufficient number of votes to elect his own candidate. On advice of Giovanni Gaetano Orsini the cardinals finally elected the only neutral cardinal, Portuguese Pedro Juliani, bishop of Frascati. The contemporary chronicles do not agree on the date of his election: dates between September 8 and September 17 are given. Most probable seems to be September 15. Due to errors in the numbering of the popes named John in the contemporary catalogs, the elect took the name John XXI, although there was no John XX. He was solemnly crowned by his grand elector Orsini on September 20.

== Legend about Pope-elect Gregory XI ==
According to the later account created probably in the ecclesiastical circles of Piacenza and popularized by Franciscan historians, Cardinal Vicedomino de Vicedomini, bishop of Palestrina and (ostensibly) dean of the College of Cardinals, was elected pope on September 5 and took the name Gregory XI in honour of his uncle Gregory X, but he died within hours of his election, before it could be proclaimed.

This story, though repeated by some notable authors (incl. Lorenzo Cardella, Gaetano Moroni or more recently Francis Burkle-Young) has several weak points. The contemporary accounts know nothing about "pope-elect Gregory XI". His election has not been recorded by any chronicle, and also Pope John XXI in the bull in which he announced his election makes no reference to this fact. On the contrary, he explicitly calls Adrian V his direct predecessor. Medieval necrology of the Cathedral of Piacenza recorded only: obiit Vicedominus quondam ep. Paenestrinus anno 1276 .., without any allusion to his election to the papacy. False or at least dubious are also other details of the story. Vicedomino ostensibly was elected under the influence of his relative, Cardinal-Bishop of Sabina Giovanni Visconti. No such cardinal existed at that time. The suburbicarian see of Sabina was occupied by Bertrand de Saint Martin, who is well attested in the curial documents until 1277. Also the statement, that Vicedomino was dean of the College (the first in the order of precedence) seems to be inaccurate – on the bulls of Gregory X which contain subscriptions of the cardinals he is always preceded by Pedro Juliani.

Together, all these facts indicate that the story about pope-elect Gregory XI is rather unlikely to be true. Perhaps this is a reminiscence of the candidature of Vicedomino in this election.

== Cardinal electors ==
| Elector | Nationality | Order and title | Elevated | Elevator | Notes |
|---|---|---|---|---|---|
| João Pedro Julião | Portuguese | Cardinal-Bishop of Frascati | June 3, 1273 | Gregory X | Dean of the College of Cardinals; Elected Pope John XXI |
| Bertrand de Saint-Martin O.S.B. | French | Cardinal-Bishop of Sabina | June 3, 1273 | Gregory X | |
| Simone Paltanieri | Monselice, near Padua | Cardinal-priest of Ss. Silvestro e Martino | December 17, 1261 | Urban IV | Protopriest |
| Anchero Pantaleone | French | Cardinal-priest of S. Prassede | May 1262 | Urban IV | Nephew of Urban IV |
| Guillaume de Bray | French | Cardinal-priest of S. Marco | May 1262 | Urban IV | |
| Riccardo Annibaldi | Roman | Cardinal-deacon of S. Angelo in Pescheria | 1238 | Gregory IX | Protodeacon, Archpriest of the patriarchal Vatican Basilica and protector of Augustinians |
| Giovanni Gaetano Orsini | Roman | Cardinal-deacon of S. Nicola in Carcere Tulliano | May 28, 1244 | Innocent IV | Inquisitor General and protector of Franciscans; Future Pope Nicholas III |
| Giacomo Savelli | Roman | Cardinal-deacon of S. Maria in Cosmedin | December 17, 1261 | Urban IV | Future Pope Honorius IV |
| Goffredo da Alatri | Alatri | Cardinal-deacon of S. Giorgio in Velabro | December 17, 1261 | Urban IV | |
| Matteo Rosso Orsini | Roman | Cardinal-deacon of S. Maria in Portico | May 1262 | Urban IV | Nephew of Pope Nicholas III |

=== Died during sede vacante ===
| Elector | Nationality | Order and title | Elevated | Elevator | Notes |
|---|---|---|---|---|---|
| Vicedomino de Vicedominis | Piacenza | Cardinal-Bishop of Palestrina | June 3, 1273 | Gregory X | nephew of Pope Gregory X; died on September 6, 1276 |

== Absentee ==
| Elector | Nationality | Order and Title | Elevated | Elevator | Notes |
|---|---|---|---|---|---|
| Simon de Brion | French | Cardinal-priest of S. Cecilia | December 17, 1261 | Urban IV | Legate in the Kingdom of France; Future Pope Martin IV |

== Bibliography ==
- Richard Stapper, Papst Johannes XXI, Kirchengeschichtliche Studien, Münster 1898.
- Konrad Eubel, Hierarchia Catholica Medii Aevi, vol. I, edition altera, Münster 1913.
