= Uberto Coconati =

Roman Catholic Cardinal

Uberto Coconati (Cocconato, de Coconatis) (died 13 July 1276), a Roman Catholic Cardinal, was born at Asti in the Piedmont region of Italy, a member of the family of the Counts of Cocconato, who were vassals of the Marchese di Monferrato. Thierry de Vaucouleurs, the author of the Johanneslegende, Uberto was "Lombardus nomine, stirpe potens" ('Lombard in name, from a powerful family').

== Family ==
Uberto had a brother named Manuel (Emmanuele). Two of his relatives became Bishop of Asti. He was not connected with the d'Elci of Siena. He had two nephews in holy orders, Bonifacio di Cocconato and Alberto.

== Career ==
Nothing is known about his education, beyond the fact that he held the title Master (Magister) when he first appears in historic sources. He had an advanced university education, therefore, and, considering his career, it must have been in law. For what it is worth, there was a fellow Piedmontese in the College of Cardinals, the influential Henry of Segusio, "Hostiensis", the most celebrated canon lawyer of his day, who had been a professor at Bologna and Paris.

=== Early career ===
In November, 1257, Uberto Coconati was present in Viterbo as a witness when Cardinal Stephanus (Istvan Báncsa), Bishop of Palestrina, issued a final ruling in a dispute between the Archbishop of Canterbury, Boniface of Savoy (1241-1270), and the Prior of the Convent of S. Trinity in London. He is called Magister Uberto de Coconato and is identified as a Papal Chaplain.

On 23 December 1257, Pope Alexander IV granted to the Commune of Perugia the farmland (contado) in the neighborhood of Gubbio which belonged to the Roman Church for a period of five years, understanding that the Commune of Perugia would pay the annual assessment of 200 small Sienese pounds. Magister Uberto de Cocanato, Apostolic Subdeacon and papal chaplain, was appointed Executor on 28 December to convene a general assembly in Perugia to appoint a Syndic with appropriate powers to oversee the arrangement; he was also to swear the People of Perugia to obey the terms of the agreement under oath, with a penalty of 10,000 silver marks if they violated the agreement. Magister Uberto then appointed the Bishop of Perugia as his Executor Subdelegate to oversee the transfers.

== Cardinal ==
Uberto Coconati was one of seven cardinals created by Pope Urban IV in a Consistory of 17 (or 24) December 1261. He was assigned the Deaconry of Sant'Eustachio.

Cardinal Uberto was able to benefit his nephew, Alberto, when Vivián, the bishop-elect of Calahorra presented himself at the Roman Curia at Orvieto, and was obligated to resign his Archdeaconry of Guadalajara. Alberto also received a canonry and prebend in the Cathedral. But when he died at Asti in 1263, the benefices were handed on by papal favor to another of the Cardinal's nephews, Bonifacius de Coconato, clericus Verzellensis ('cleric of Vercelli'). Another nephew, Rainerius, was confirmed as a prebendary of the Church of Leon in Spain, during a process ordered by Pope Urban IV to reduce the number of papal appointments in that Church from twelve, which had been granted by Alexander IV, to six.

In 1265, Cardinal Uberto became the Protector of the Roman Catholic Diocese of Salamanca. When Bishop Domingo Dominici of Salamanca died on 30 January 1268, he left in a codicil to his Will 150 maravedis al cardenal don Uberto de Cucunato.

In 1267, Cardinal Uberto was named Auditor (judge) in the case of the confirmation of an Abbess for the monastery of S. Trinité de Caën in the diocese of Bayeux.

== Council of Lyon ==
He travelled to Lyon in 1273, and was present at the opening session of the Second Ecumenical Council of Lyon on 1 May 1274. Cardinal Uberto de Coconati was one of thirteen cardinals who attended a Consistory in Lyons on 6 June 1274, when the Pope and Cardinals received the Chancellor of Rudolf, King of the Romans, who had come to Lyons to arrange for papal recognition of Rudolf's election as Emperor. He was not, however, one of the cardinals who accompanied Pope Gregory X on his return journey to Italy; he was not present in Lausanne on 20 October 1275, when Pope Gregory received the Oath of Feudal Loyalty of Rudolf, King of the Romans.

In 1275, while he was in Lyons, Cardinal Uberto became involved in the beginning phase of the long dispute between Tedisio de Camilla and his opponents, the Archbishops of Canterbury, first Robert Kilwardby (1273-1278) and then John Peckham (1279-1292). Both Primates of England disliked the idea of clergy holding multiple benefices which involved the care of souls at the same time, and particularly when they were foreigners appointed by the Roman Curia. Tedisio (Theodosius), an Italian from the territory of Genoa, was a cousin of Cardinal Ottobono Fieschi, who had been Apostolic Legate in England from 1265 to 1268. At the time the conflict began, Tedisio was Rector of Wingham (the King's Chapel) and Terringes as well as Dean of Wolverhampton. He tenaciously refused to surrender his benefices and repeatedly appealed to the Pope. At one moment, Cardinal Uberto was appealed to, and he issued a letter advising Archbishop Kilwardby to desist. His letter is mentioned in a mandate of Pope Gregory X to the Archbishop to do nothing further about Tedisio until the Pope sends him further instructions. Gregory X actually authorized Tedisio to found a college at Wingham. On 13 November 1276, Pope John XXI dispensed Tedisio with respect to his benefices. He was instructed, however, to resign the parish of Wistanestea and Frondingham in the diocese of Lincoln, and the parish of Archexea in the diocese of York. It is clear that Tedisio had powerful friends at the Roman Curia, and that the policy of the English Archbishops interfered with papal prerogatives. It also is revealed that Tedisio was not an ordained priest, and he was dispensed from that requirement as well.

Cardinal Uberto and eleven or twelve other cardinals participated in the Conclave of 20–21 January 1276, which followed the death of Pope Gregory X and which elected Pierre de Tarantaise as Pope Innocent V. Cardinal Uberto also participated in the Conclave of 2–11 July 1276, which followed the death of Pope Innocent V and which elected Ottobono Fieschi as Pope Adrian V. He ruled for thirty-nine days, was never ordained a priest, consecrated a bishop, or crowned as Pope.

Cardinal Uberto Coconati was one of the cardinals who was present, according to Pope John XXI in his decree "Licet felicis", when Pope Adrian V suspended the Constitution of Pope Gregory X on conclaves, "Ubi Periculum". The Consistory could only have taken place in Rome on 11 July, the day of his election, or perhaps 12 July. Pope Adrian was already in Viterbo on 23 July, when he signed his only bull. This decision to suspend the Conclave regulations had dire consequences over the next thirty years, since it facilitated the manipulation of cardinals in Conclave by outside parties, especially King Charles I of Naples.

== Death ==
Cardinal Uberto Coconati died in Rome on 13 July 1276, two days after the election of Pope Adrian V.

== Bibliography ==
- Antonio Franchi, Il conclave di Viterbo (1268-1271) e le sue origini: saggio con documenti inediti (Assisi: Porziuncola, 1993) 63, 96-113.
- Andreas Fischer, Kardinäle im Konklave: die lange Sedisvakantz der Jahre 1268 bis 1271 (Berlin: Walter de Gruyter 2008), pp. 165–171.
- Jean-Daniel Morerod, "Aller à Lausanne pour une bulle. Papes, curialistes et solliciteurs (XIIe-XIIIe siècle)," Aspects diplomatiques des voyages pontificaux (ed. B. Barbiche, R. Grosse) (Paris 2008), 182-193.
