= Riccardo Annibaldi =

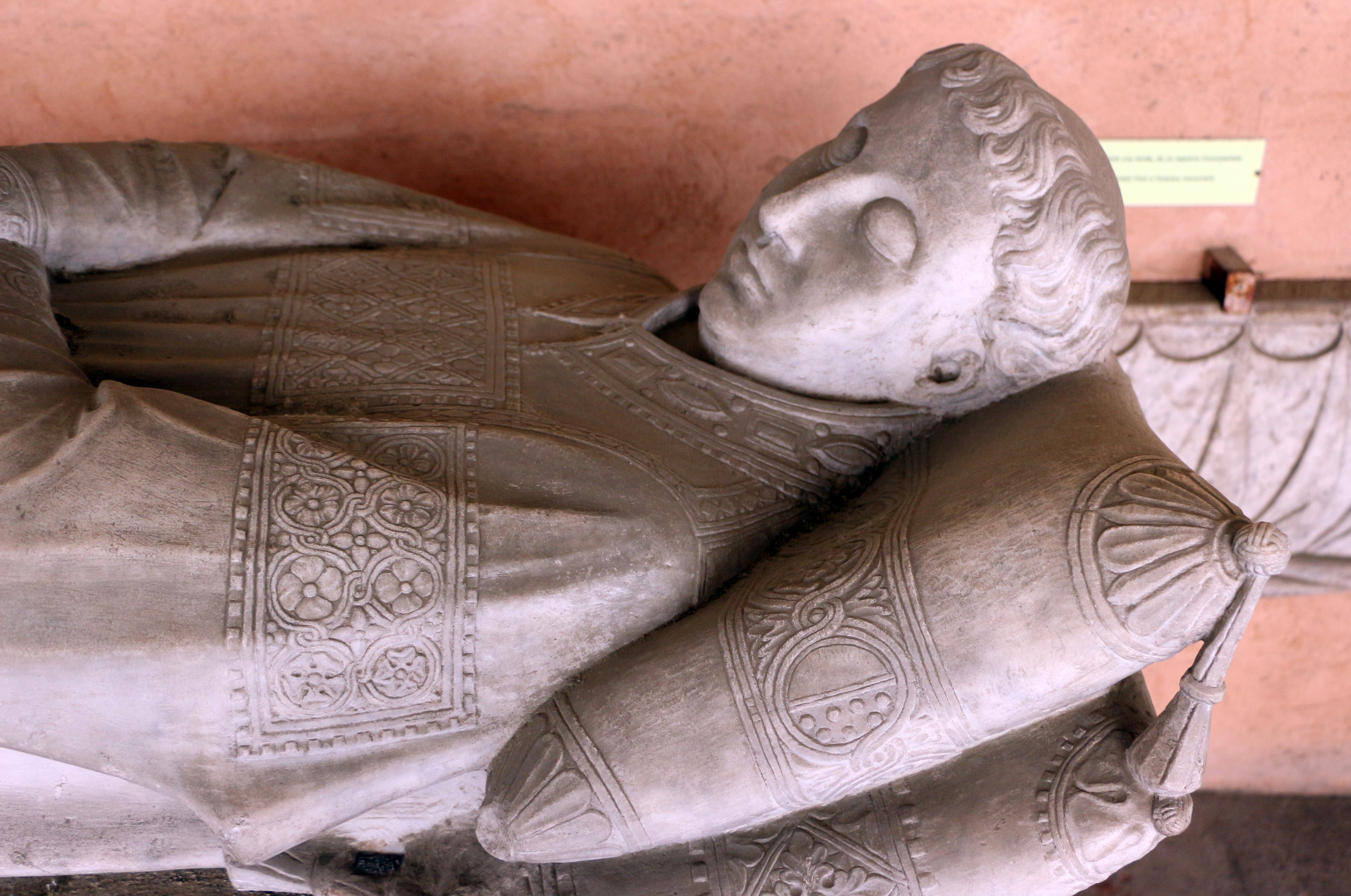
Riccardo Annibaldi

Riccardo Annibaldi (1200 – October 4, 1276) was an Italian cardinal. A nephew of Pope Innocent III, he was also related to Popes Gregory IX and Alexander IV. Pope Gregory IX appointed him cardinal deacon of Sant'Angelo in Pescheria probably in 1238, as the first bull signed by him is dated June 25, 1238.

From 1239 to 1249 he was a rector (governor) of the province of Campagna e Marittima. In year 1243 he was appointed the first cardinal protector of the Tuscan Hermits, one of the predecessor groups to the Augustinian Order; he held this position until his death in 1276. In 1244 he oversaw the Tuscan Hermits' adoption of the Rule of St Augustine and the so-called Small Union. Riccardo never formally joined the Augustinian Order, ultimately leading the Friars to forge new origin myths linking them back to St Augustine as they could not rely on the prestige of Annibaldi as a founding figure. Riccardo did not attend the Second Council of Lyon but his influence there likely saved the Order from suppression, as the papacy moved to close down religious orders with a perceived lack of antiquity. The 1274 general chapter meeting of the Augustinian Friars was held in Molara, the ancestral castle of the Annibaldi family.

== Bibliography ==
- "Riccardo Annibaldi: first protector of the augustinian order". ghirardacci.it (in Italian).
- "RICHARDUS DE ANNIBALDIS".
- "Augnet.org: 4305 Richard Annibaldi".
- Ilko, Krisztina (2025). The Sons of St Augustine: Art and Memory in the Augustinian Churches of Central Italy, 1256–1370. Oxford: Oxford University Press.
