= Pope Adrian V =

Head of the Catholic Church in 1276

- Bishop of Rome
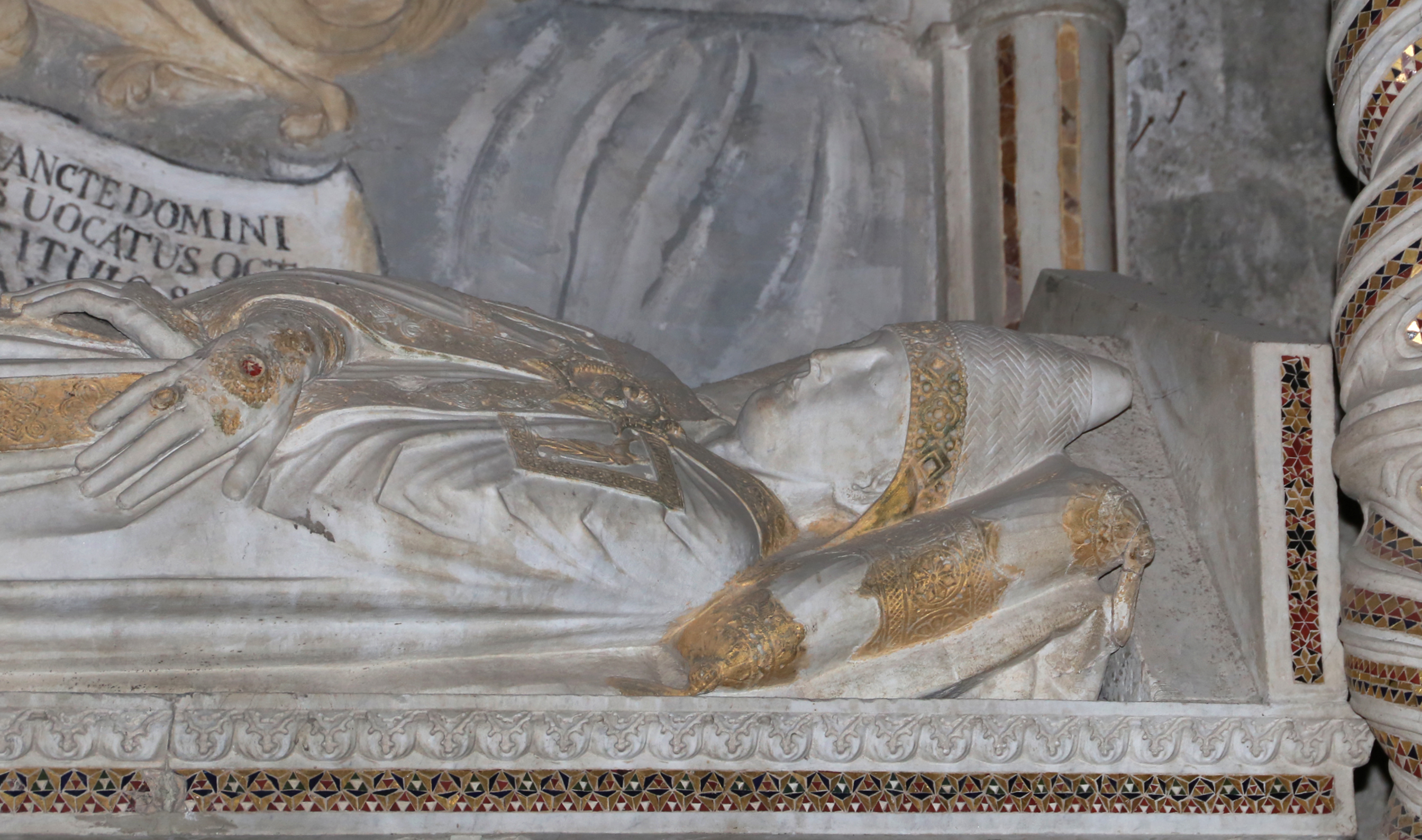
- Tomb of Adrian V
- Church: Catholic Church
- Papacy began: 11 July 1276
- Papacy ended: 18 August 1276
- Predecessor: Innocent V
- Successor: John XXI
- Previous posts: Cardinal-Deacon of Sant’Adriano al Foro (1251–1276); Archpriest of the Basilica di Santa Maria Maggiore (1262–1276)

Orders
- Created cardinal: December 1251 by Innocent IV

Personal details
- Born: Ottobuono de' Fieschi c. 1210–1220 Genoa, Republic of Genoa
- Died: 18 August 1276 Viterbo, Papal States
- Coat of arms

Coat of Arms of the Fieschi family.

Pope Adrian V (Latin: Hadrianus V; c. 1210/1220 – 18 August 1276), born Ottobuono de' Fieschi, was the head of the Catholic Church and ruler of the Papal States from 11 July 1276 to his death on 18 August 1276. He was an envoy of Pope Clement IV sent to England in May 1265 who successfully completed his task of resolving disputes between King Henry III of England and his barons. Adrian V was elected pope following the death of Innocent V, but died of natural illness before being ordained to the priesthood.

In the Divine Comedy, Dante meets Adrian V in the fifth terrace of Purgatorio where Adrian V cleanses for the vice of avarice.

== Biography ==
Ottobuono belonged to a feudal family of Liguria, the Fieschi, counts of Lavagna. His first clerical position came in 1243, when he was created a papal chaplain. Subsequently, he received several ecclesiastical benefices, becoming archdeacon in Bologna (1244) and Parma (1244/48–1255), canon and chancellor of the cathedral chapter in Reims (1243–1250), canon and dean of the chapter in Piacenza (c. 1247) and canon of the cathedral chapter in Paris (1244/45–1270). In December 1251, he was created Cardinal Deacon of San Adriano by his uncle Pope Innocent IV. He was also archpriest of the patriarchal Liberian Basilica (attested from 1262).

He was sent to England in 1265 by Pope Clement IV to mediate between King Henry III of England and his barons, and to preach the Crusades. Fieschi was related distantly, by affinity, to Henry III; his sister had married Thomas II of Savoy, who was a cousin of Henry's wife, Eleanor of Provence.

He remained in England for several years as the papal legate, serving from October 1265 to July 1268. His diplomatic position was such that his name is still on the oldest extant piece of English statute law, the Statute of Marlborough of 1267, where the formal title mentions as a witness "the Lord Ottobon, at that time legate in England". (Also on this legation was a young diplomat, the future Boniface VIII.) In April 1268 he issued a set of canons, which formed the basis of church law in England until the Protestant Reformation of the sixteenth century.

Under the influence of Charles I of Anjou, he was elected pope to succeed Innocent V on 11 July 1276 but died at Viterbo on 18 August 1276 from illness without ever having been ordained to the priesthood. He is buried there in the church of San Francesco alla Rocca. His funeral monument is attributed to Arnolfo di Cambio. Adrian V was the third pope in the "Year of Four Popes" of 1276.

He annulled Pope Gregory X's bull on the holding of papal conclaves, but died before enacting new regulations.

== In literature ==
=== Pope Adrian V in Dante's Divine Comedy ===
In the Divine Comedy, Dante Alighieri meets Pope Adrian V in the fifth terrace of Purgatorio (reserved for the avaricious and the prodigal) where Adrian V is being cleansed of the vice of avarice (Purgatorio 19.79-145). Since the souls in this terrace purge their vices by facing down on earth and fixing their eyes on the ground, Adrian V’s identity is not revealed by facial recognition but through indirect inference. His papal identity is inferred from his Latin phrase, scias quod ego fui successor Petri ("I was Peter’s successor," Purgatorio 19.99), and by his words fui roman pastore ("I was a Roman shepherd," Purgatorio 19.107). These phrases reveal the papal identity of Adrian V, given that popes are successors of the first pope, Saint Peter, and shepherds of the church in the teachings of the Catholic Church. Adrian V also describes his family name as being descended from those that reside between Sestri and Chiavari (Purgatorio 19.100-102). This reveals his family title, Fieschi, as the family held extensive land between the two cities.

There exists a lack of historical evidence about Adrian V’s avaricious behavior. Some scholars believe that Dante’s view of Adrian V emanated from reading excerpts from John of Salisbury's Policraticus, in which the author anonymously attributed the behavior of avarice to Adrian IV. Dante likely interpreted the excerpts as referring to Adrian V instead of Adrian IV.

Despite the possible misinterpretation of Adrian V’s character, his presence in the Comedy help to understand Dante’s views about the Church and the role of women in achieving man’s salvation. Pope Adrian V’s representation of avarice reflects the zealous ambition for earthly power and goods. Adrian V describes that he had to detach himself from the love of worldly things that came to be after he was assigned the papal sit in the short period he was a pope (Purgatorio 19.106-114). This symbolizes Dante’s view of how avarice was at the heart of the church and popes in the Middle Ages were excessively drawn to earthly things and preoccupied with exercising power. Moreover, Adrian V outlines not only his avarice but also the corrupt nature of his family, with the exception of his niece, Alagia Fieschi (Purgatorio 19.142-145). In a melancholic tone, Adrian V expresses how Alagia is the only remaining virtuous woman whose extension of prayer can help his journey of salvation. Alagia's portrayal reflects Dante’s view of how Christian women play a miraculous role in men’s achievement of salvation through their prayer.

== See also ==
- List of popes

Catholic Church titles
Preceded by Innocent V	Pope; 1276	Succeeded by John XXI
