= Pope John XXI =

Head of the Catholic Church from 1276 to 1277

- Bishop of Rome
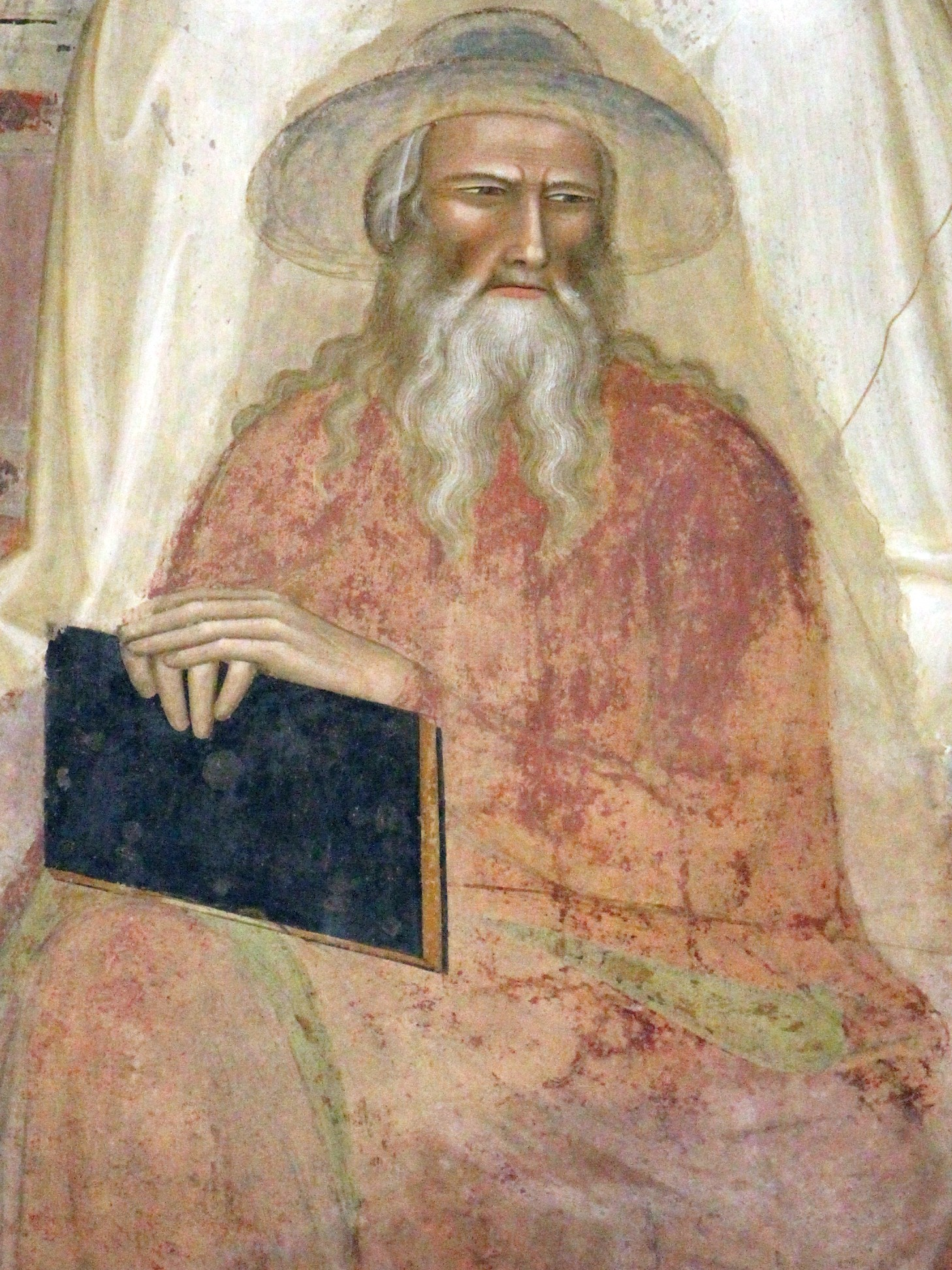
- Portrait identified as Peter of Spain, by Andrea di Bonaiuto, c. 1366
- Church: Catholic Church
- Papacy began: 8 September 1276
- Papacy ended: 20 May 1277
- Predecessor: Adrian V
- Successor: Nicholas III
- Previous posts: Archbishop of Braga (1272–1275); Cardinal-Bishop of Frascati (1273–1276)

Orders
- Ordination: May 1275
- Created cardinal: 3 June 1273 by Gregory X

Personal details
- Born: Pedro Julião c. 1215 Lisbon, Portugal
- Died: 20 May 1277 (aged 61–62) Viterbo, Papal States
- Coat of arms: John XXI's coat of arms

Pope John XXI (Latin: Ioannes XXI, Italian: Giovanni XXI, Portuguese: João XXI; c. 1215 – 20 May 1277), born Pedro Julião (Latin: Petrus Iulianus), was head of the Catholic Church and ruler of the Papal States from 8 September 1276 to his death in May 1277. He is the only Portuguese pope in history. (Note: Pope Damasus I was born in what is today Portugal, but isn't considered Portuguese.) He is sometimes identified with the logician and herbalist Peter of Spain (Latin: Petrus Hispanus; Portuguese: Pedro Hispano), which would make him the only pope to have been a physician.

== Early life ==
Pedro Julião was born in Lisbon between 1210 and 1220 to Julião Pais and Mor Mendes. His father was chancellor of Afonso Henriques and Sancho I. He started his studies at the episcopal school of Lisbon Cathedral and later joined the University of Paris, although some historians claim that he was educated at Montpellier. Wherever he studied, he concentrated on medicine, theology, logic, physics, metaphysics, and Aristotle's dialectic. He is traditionally and usually identified with the medical author Peter of Spain, an important figure in the development of logic and pharmacology. Peter of Spain taught at the University of Siena in the 1240s and his Summulae Logicales was used as a university textbook on Aristotelian logic for the next three centuries. At the court in Lisbon, he was the councilor and spokesman for King Afonso III in church matters. Later, he became prior of Guimarães.

He was Archdeacon of Vermoim (Vermuy) in the Archdiocese of Braga. He tried to become bishop of Lisbon but was defeated. Instead, he became the Master of the school of Lisbon. Peter became the physician of Pope Gregory X (1271–1276) early in his reign. In March 1273, he was elected Archbishop of Braga, but did not assume that post; instead, on 3 June 1273, Pope Gregory X created him Cardinal Bishop of Tusculum (Frascati).

== Papacy ==
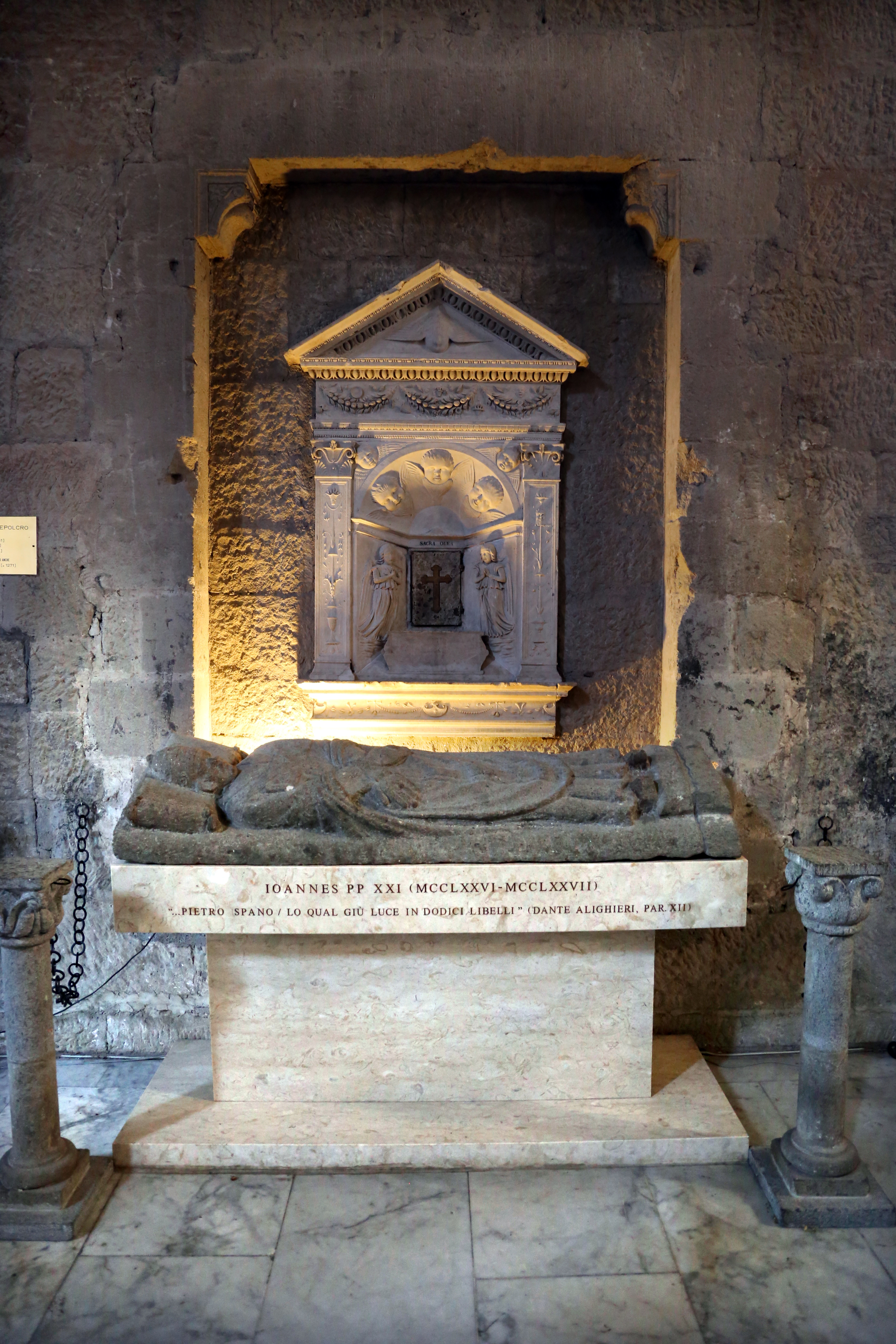
Tomb of Pope John XXI in Viterbo Cathedral

After the death of Pope Adrian V on 18 August 1276, Peter was elected pope on 8 September. He was crowned a week later on 20 September. One of John XXI's few acts during his brief reign was the reversal of a decree recently passed at the Second Council of Lyon (1274); the decree had not only confined cardinals in solitude until they elected a successor pope, but also progressively restricted their supplies of food and wine if their deliberations took too long. Though much of John XXI's brief papacy was dominated by the powerful Cardinal Giovanni Gaetano Orsini, who succeeded him as Pope Nicholas III, John attempted to launch a crusade for the Holy Land, pushed for a union with the Eastern church, and did what he could to maintain peace between the Christian nations.

Among his other acts, he excommunicated Afonso III of Portugal for interfering with episcopal elections and sent legates to Kublai Khan. He also launched a mission to convert the Tatars, but he died before it could start.

To secure the necessary quiet for his medical studies, he had an apartment added to the papal palace at Viterbo, to which he could retire when he wished to work undisturbed. On 14 May 1277, while the pope was alone in this apartment, the ceiling collapsed; John was rescued alive from beneath the rubble; however, he died of his serious injuries on 20 May, possibly an early recorded case of crush syndrome.

He was buried in the Duomo di Viterbo, where his tomb can still be seen. The original porphyry sarcophagus was destroyed during the cathedral's 16th-century refurbishment, and was replaced with a more modest one in stone with the pope's effigy. In the 19th century, the Duke of Saldanha, as Portuguese Ambassador to the Holy See, had the pope's remains transferred to a new sarcophagus sculpted by Filippo Gnaccarini. In 2000, the Lisbon City Council, led by Mayor João Soares, successfully had a new funeral monument built in lioz stone, topped by the original stone effigy of the pope, placed in a more condign location in the transept.

== Legacy ==
After his death, it was rumored that John XXI had actually been a necromancer, a suspicion frequently directed towards the few scholars among medieval popes (see, e.g., Sylvester II). It was also said that his death had been an act of God, stopping him from completing a heretical treatise. Since the works of "Peter of Spain" continued to be studied and appreciated, however, Dante Alighieri placed "Pietro Spano" in his Paradiso's Sphere of the Sun with the spirits of other great religious scholars.

== See also ==
- List of popes

== Notes ==
Catholic Church titles
| Preceded by Adrian V | Pope; 1276–77 | Succeeded by Nicholas III |
