= Cardinals created by Gregory X =

Catholic appointments in 1273

Pope Gregory X (1271–1276) create five cardinals in one consistory.

== Consistory of 3 June 1273 ==
- Pedro Julião, archbishop of Braga — cardinal-bishop of Frascati, later elected Pope John XXI (20 September 1276), † 20 May 1277
- Vicedomino de Vicedominis, nephew of the pope and archbishop of Aix — cardinal-bishop of Palestrina, † 6 September 1276
- Bonaventure, O.F.M., Minister General of the Order of Friars Minor — cardinal-bishop of Albano, † 15 July 1274
- Pierre de Tarentaise, O.P., archbishop of Lyon — cardinal-bishop of Ostia e Velletri, then (21 January 1276) Pope Innocent V † 22 June 1276
- Bertrand de Saint-Martin, O.S.B., archbishop of Arles — cardinal-bishop of Sabina, † 28 March 1278 (?)

== "Presumed cardinals" ==
According to Cardella in 1275 Gregory X celebrated the second consistory for the creation of two additional cardinals, but modern scholars have established that this never happened:

"Presumed" cardinal	Alleged cardinalate	Notes
Giovanni Visconti, nephew of the pope	Cardinal-bishop of Sabina 1275–1277/78. According to Cardella, in 1276 he was named judge in the case concerning the translation of bishop Giovanni of Potenza to the archbishopric of Monreale, postulated by the cathedral chapter of Monreale	The existence of this cardinal is not possible at that time because the suburbicarian see of Sabina was occupied by Bertrand de Saint-Martin from 1273 until 1278 The document of John XXI concerning the postulation of bishop Giovanni of Potenza to the see of Monreale actually refers to cardinal Bertrand and even explicitly calls him by name!
Teobaldo de Ceccano, O.Cist., abbot of Fossanova	Cardinal-priest 1275–1279, papal legate on several occasions	There is no documentary proof of his promotion to the cardinalate; contemporary sources call him only abbot of Fossanova

Apart from the lack of any documentary proof attesting the promotion of these individuals (in the case of Visconti even of his existence), the contemporary chronicler Salimbene explicitly says that the consistory of 1273 was the only single promotion of new cardinals in the pontificate of Gregory X, and mentions only five cardinals promoted at that time.

== Sources ==
- Miranda, Salvador. "Consistories for the creation of Cardinals 13th Century (1198-1303): Gregory X (1271-1276)". The Cardinals of the Holy Roman Church. Florida International University. OCLC 53276621.
- Konrad Eubel: Hierarchia Catholica Medii Aevi, vol. 1, Münster 1913
- Richard Stapper: Papst Johannes XXI, Kirchengeschichtliche Studien, Münster 1898
- Richard Sternfeld, Der Kardinal Johann Gaetan Orsini (Papst Nikolaus III.) 1244-1277, Berlin 1905
- Lorenzo Cardella: Memorie storiche de' cardinali della Santa Romana Chiesa, vol. 2, Rome 1793
