= 1280–1281 papal election =

Election of Catholic Pope Martin IV

Papal election 1280–81

Dates and location
- 22 September 1280 – February 22, 1281; Palazzo dei Papi di Viterbo

Key officials
- Dean: Ordonho Alvares
- Protopriest: Anchero Pantaleone
- Protodeacon: Giacomo Savelli

Elected pope
- Simon de Brion; Name taken: Martin IV
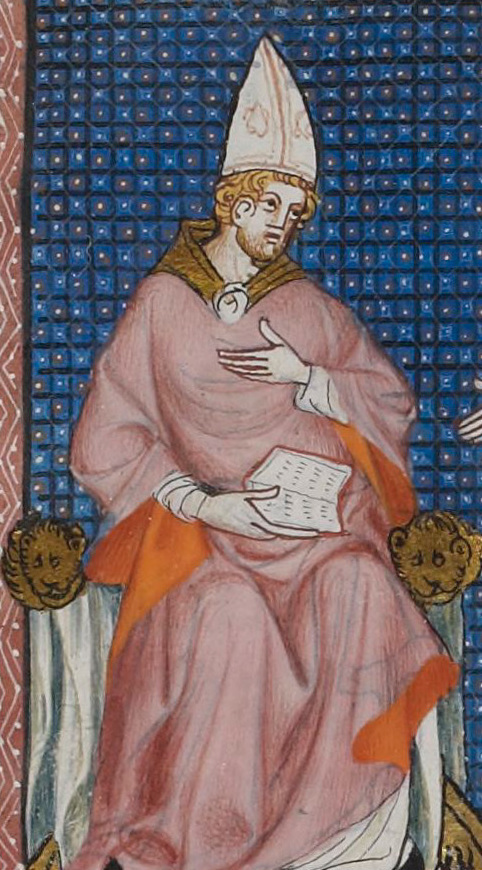

The 1280–81 papal election (September 22 – February 22) elected Simon de Brion, who took the name Pope Martin IV, as the successor to Pope Nicholas III.

The protracted election is unique due to the violent removal of two cardinals—Matteo Orsini and Giordano Orsini—by the magistrates of Viterbo on the charges that they were "impeding" the election. Only a decade earlier, the magistrates of Viterbo had intervened in the papal election, 1268–1271 by removing the roof tiles of the Palazzo dei Papi di Viterbo to speed up another deadlocked contest. The expulsion of the Orsini and the subsequent election of Simon was due to the influence of Charles I of Naples ("Charles of Anjou").

== Context ==
The previous meeting of the cardinals, the papal election, 1277, had dragged on for six months as the six cardinal electors (the fewest in the history of the Roman Catholic Church), were evenly divided between the Roman and Angevin factions. The aged Giovanni Gaetano Orsini was elected Pope Nicholas III, to the dissatisfaction of Charles I of Naples (whose interests were supported by the three French cardinals).

Previously, Pope Clement IV had crowned Charles I the King of Naples and Sicily (previously a papal fief), but had failed to sufficiently stack the College of Cardinals with like-minded cardinals. Following Clement's death, the papal election, 1268–1271, was the longest in the history of the Roman Catholic Church, eventually electing outsider Teobaldo Visconti as Pope Gregory X, who concerned his papacy with little more than the advocacy of the Crusades (having been elected while not a cardinal on the Crusades). Although Gregory X had issued a papal bull Ubi Periculum (1274), mandating the stricture of the papal conclave to accelerate disputed papal elections, the bull was not in force at the time of this election, having been suspended by Pope Adrian V and revoked by Pope John XXI.

== Cardinal electors ==
Elector	Nationality	Cardinalatial order and title	Elevated	Elevator	Other ecclesiastical titles	Notes
Ordonho Alvares	Portuguese	Cardinal-bishop of Frascati	1278, March 12	Nicholas III	Dean of the College of Cardinals	
Latino Malabranca Orsini, O.P.	Rome	Cardinal-bishop of Ostia e Velletri	1278, March 12	Nicholas III	Inquisitor General	Cardinal-nephew
Bentivenga dei Bentivenghi, O.F.M.	Acquasparta	Cardinal-bishop of Albano	1278, March 12	Nicholas III	Grand penitentiary	
Anchero Pantaléone	French	Cardinal-priest of S. Prassede	1262, May 22	Urban IV	Protopriest	Cardinal-nephew
Simon de Brion	French	Cardinal-priest of S. Cecilia	1261, December 17	Urban IV		Elected Pope Martin IV
Guillaume de Bray	French	Cardinal-priest of S. Marco	1262, May 22	Urban IV		
Gerardo Bianchi	Parma	Cardinal-priest of Ss. XII Apostoli	1278, March 12	Nicholas III		
Girolamo Masci, O.F.M.	Lisciano	Cardinal-priest of S. Pudenziana	1278, March 12	Nicholas III		Future Pope Nicholas IV
Giacomo Savelli	Rome	Cardinal-deacon of S. Maria in Cosmedin	1261, December 17	Urban IV	Protodeacon	Future Pope Honorius IV
Goffredo da Alatri	Alatri	Cardinal-deacon of S. Giorgio in Velabro	1261, December 17	Urban IV		
Matteo Rosso Orsini	Rome	Cardinal-deacon of S. Maria in Portico	1262, May 22	Urban IV	Archpriest of the Vatican Basilica	Removed by the magistrates of Viterbo
Giordano Orsini	Rome	Cardinal-deacon of S. Eustachio	1278, March 12	Nicholas III		Removed by the magistrates of Viterbo; Cardinal-nephew
Giacomo Colonna	Rome	Cardinal-deacon of S. Maria in Via Lata	1278, March 12	Nicholas III	Archpriest of the Liberian Basilica	

=== Absentee cardinal ===
Elector	Nationality	Cardinalatial order and title	Elevated	Elevator	Other ecclesiastical titles	Notes
Bernard Ayglerius, O.S.B.	French	Unknown	1265 or 1268	Clement IV	Abbot of Montecassino	De facto retired (also 'retired' at the Conclave of 1268–1271; the three conclaves of 1276; the Conclave of 1277); several sources doubt that he was ever promoted to the cardinalate.

== Proceedings ==
From the start of the conclave, the anti-Angevin faction, mostly cardinals created by Nicholas III, who controlled many key positions in the college and included three Orsini cardinals, had consolidated themselves as an unbreakable voting bloc.

The breakthrough in the deadlock came when Charles I replaced Orso Orsini, the podestà of Viterbo, with Riccardello Annibaldi, who proceeded to burst into the election and arrest and remove the Orsini cardinals, allowing the pro-Angevin faction and the Aldobrandeschi partisans to push through the election of Simon de Brion, the favored candidate of Charles, as Pope Martin IV. Giordano, the leader of the anti-French faction, and his nephew Matteo, were imprisoned, actions that ensured that the new French pope would find no welcome in returning to Rome. In fact, Martin IV never set foot in Rome during his papacy of forty-nine months.

== Aftermath ==
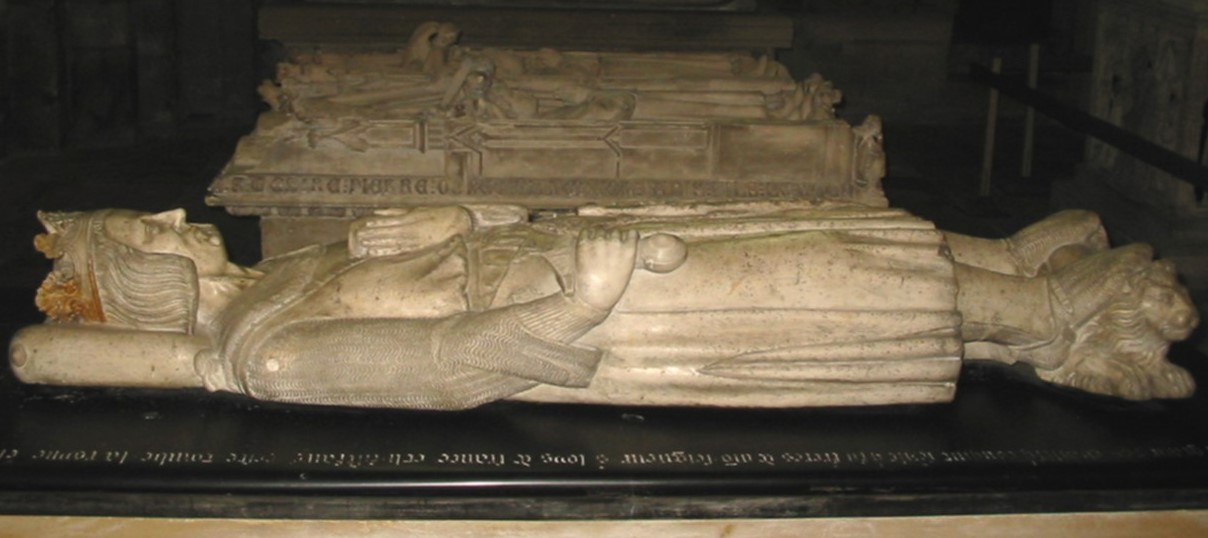
The tomb of Charles I of Naples ("Charles of Anjou"), who engineered the election of Martin IV and exercised considerable influence over him

The imprisonment of the cardinals caused an interdict to be placed on the city of Viterbo. As a result of the interdict, and of the hostility of the city of Rome to a pontiff favorable to the Angevins, Martin IV was compelled to move the Roman Curia to Orvieto, where he was crowned on March 23, 1281. Among the first acts of Martin IV were to remove from prominent positions the Orsini cardinal-nephews of his predecessor, Nicholas III, and to replace them with French and pro-French candidates.

Martin IV remained dependent on Charles throughout his papacy; soon after his coronation, on 29 April he named Charles a Roman Senator and assisted in his attempts to restore the Latin Empire, including through the excommunication of Byzantine Emperor Michael VIII Palaiologos. The latter act resulted in the undoing of the fragile union of East and West brokered at the Council of Lyons in 1274. Martin IV's support of Charles continued after the Sicilian Vespers, when Martin IV excommunicated Peter III of Aragon, recently elected by the Sicilians as king, and further declared null his kingship in Aragon and ordered a crusade against him, which resulted in the ensuing War of the Sicilian Vespers.

The first seven cardinals appointed by Martin IV were French, but the fact that Martin IV's death coincided with that of Charles I inevitably began to weaken the French influence.
