= Bertrand de Saint-Martin =

French cardinal

Bertrand de Saint-Martin (died 28 or 29 March 1278) was a French cardinal.

He was born in Arles.

== Career in the Church ==
He entered the Order of Benedictines and by 1238 was dean of the abbey of Saint-André de Villeneuve at Avignon. In 1248 he was elected bishop of Fréjus (1248-1264) by the Cathedral Chapter. He was already consecrated on 9 August, when he participated in the dedication of the Dominican convent of Baume in Sisteron. He had already been named Coadjutor of the Archbishop of Aix by 20 February 1250. In July 1252 he took part in the final negotiations for a peace between Aix and Marseille. On 13 July 1257, he was present at Brignoles at a ceremony of infeudation, between Charles, Count of Anjou, and Gilbert de Baux. In 1264 he was transferred to the see of Avignon, and in 1266 to the metropolitan see of Arles.

== Cardinal ==
Pope Gregory X (1271-1276) created him Cardinal-Bishop of Sabina on 3 June 1273. He was Legate in Lombardy, perhaps after the time of his creation in June 1273. He participated in the Second Council of Lyon (1274). His name appears among signatories of the papal bulls between 7 March 1274 and 23 March 1275. He pronounced the decision in an arbitration, along with Cardinal Vicedomino de Vicedominis, at Lyon on 25 April 1275. On 7 June 1275, at Bellicadri, he was assigned the Roman titulus of S. Marcello in commendam He apparently did not accompany Pope Gregory X in the return trip from Lyon to Rome. His name is not mentioned among the cardinals at Lausanne, who witnessed the oath of fealty of King Rudolf I. He had joined the Curia, however, by the time it was in Arezzo, since he was one of the three Cardinal-bishops who were present at the death of Gregory X on 10 January 1276.

== 1276 ==
He participated in the three papal conclaves in 1276. The first conclave began in the Episcopal Palace in Arezzo on 21 January, in accordance with the Constitution "Ubi Periculum" of Gregory X. The conclave was brief. On 21 January, on the first ballot, the cardinals unanimously elected Cardinal Peter of Tarantaise in Savoy, OP, the senior Cardinal-Bishop. The new Pope, Innocent V, died on 22 June 1276, after a reign of five months and one day. The Annals of Verona state that he had been poisoned, on orders of King Charles I of Sicily.

The second Conclave of 1276 opened in Rome, in the Lateran Palace, on 2 July. There were thirteen cardinals in attendance; Cardinal Simon de Brion was acting as Legate in France. This time the Conclave lasted ten days. A struggle developed between the cardinals who favored the Angevin Charles of Sicily and the cardinals who were hostile to his influence. Charles had been in Rome since 8 January, and, as Senator of Rome, he was the Governor of the Conclave. He was partisan, and was using pressure to have one of his supporters elected. On 11 July the cardinals settled on Cardinal Ottobono Fieschi of Genoa, the nephew of Pope Innocent IV, who took the name Adrian V. He was not yet a priest, let alone a bishop. He died on 18 August 1276, after only thirty-nine days in office. He had not been consecrated a bishop, and nor had he been crowned pope. A rumor circulated in German monasteries that he had been poisoned, along with Cardinal Riccardo Annibaldi.

During his brief tenure of the Apostolic throne, Adrian V appointed Cardinal Bertrand de Saint-Martin and two other cardinals to go to King Charles I of Sicily, who was in Rome, and invite him to come to Viterbo to swear his feudal oath of allegiance to the pope.

The third Conclave of 1276, should have begun in Viterbo ten days after the death of Pope Adrian V, according to the Constitution of Gregory X, "Ubi Periculum". The date should have been 28 August or 29 August. However, Pope Adrian had suspended that very constitution while he was still in Rome, shortly after his election. He had summoned a Consistory, in which all the cardinals were present except Vicedomino de Vicedominis, Uberto d'Elci, Guillaume de Bray, and Simon de Brion (who was serving as papal Legate in France). The meeting discussed the problems that had been encountered in the two conclaves that year, and it was agreed that adjustments and additions were needed. Pope Adrian agreed to rework "Ubi periculum" and issue a new constitution. But in the meantime "Ubi periculum" was suspended. The Conclave did not begin, therefore, in accordance with the regulations of Gregory X. In any case, there were people in Viterbo who were unhappy at the way business was being done. Popular riots erupted in Viterbo, but the leaders were prelates and members of the papal Curia. A long drawn out Conclave, like the one of 1268-1271, was neither to their taste nor to their pocketbooks. Without a pope, bishops could not be appointed, benefices could not be granted, privileges and concessions could not be granted, and the curia could not collect its fees for those transactions or benefit in them themselves. The Conclave did not begin voting, therefore, until 8 September 1276, but its work was accomplished quickly. On the first ballot, ten cardinals elected the eleventh, the Portuguese cardinal, Peter of Lisbon, who took the name John XXI (despite the fact that there had been no John XX). John XXI (XX) was crowned in the Cathedral of St. Lorenzo in Viterbo on 20 September 1276, by Cardinal Giovanni Gaetano Orsini, the Cardinal Protodeacon.

Cardinal Bertrand became prior episcoporum in September 1276, upon the election of Peter of Lisbon, the Cardinal Bishop of Tusculum to the Papacy. Bertrand was the only cardinal-bishop in the College at that time, and one of only eleven cardinals. No cardinals had been appointed since the Consistory on 3 June 1273, in which Bertrand himself and four others had been elevated. Pope John XXI had an immediate job for Cardinal Bertrand. He was assigned to lead the investigation into the persons responsible for the disorders which took place during the Sede Vacante. The Pope wanted confessions, and not the sacramental sort. He believed that scriptores and procurators in the Curia were the ringleaders, and if their confessions were not forthcoming within a week, Cardinal Bertrand was to proceed to inquisition.

== Death ==
Pope John XXI was killed suddenly, when the roof of a room in the Episcopal Palace in Viterbo, which had recently been constructed, happened to fall on him. He lingered for a few days, and died on 20 May 1277. The Conclave probably began on 30 or 31 May, but it was no easy business to elect a pope. There were only seven cardinals (Simon de Brion was still Legate in France), and they were bitterly divided, three in the Angevin party, and three in the Imperial. The seventh was the Bishop of Sabina, Bertrand de Saint-Martin, who favored neither party. The chronicle lists Symonus de Tursso (de Brion) as present, and does not mention Geoffrey d'Alatri at all; it is Geoffrey who was present and Simon who was absent. It was not until 25 November that a successful election took place. Cardinal Giovanni Gaetano Orsini, a Roman, became Pope Nicholas III.

For a long time it was thought that Cardinal Bertrand de Saint-Martin died during the Second Council of Lyon in 1274 or in 1275, and shortly thereafter was succeeded in the see of Sabina by Giovanni Visconti, nephew of Gregory X. However, modern research has established that "cardinal Giovanni Visconti" never existed, while Bertrand is attested in the papal documents until the Sede Vacante following the pontificate of John XXI (died in Viterbo on 16 May 1277). His death has been registered in the contemporary necrologies under 28 March or 29 March. The most probable year of his death seems to be 1278, because contemporary sources mention him as participant in the papal election, 1277, which took place between May and November, and (by inference) in the first consistory of Pope Nicholas III on 12 March 1278. At that Consistory, no new cardinal-bishop of Sabina had been appointed to replace him, although all the other episcopal seats were then filled. It would seem that Bertrand was still holding his.

Cardinal Bertrand is spoken of as deceased in a letter of Nicholas III of 5 April 1278.
