= Displaying the Body of Saint Bonaventure =

Painting by Francisco de Zurbarán

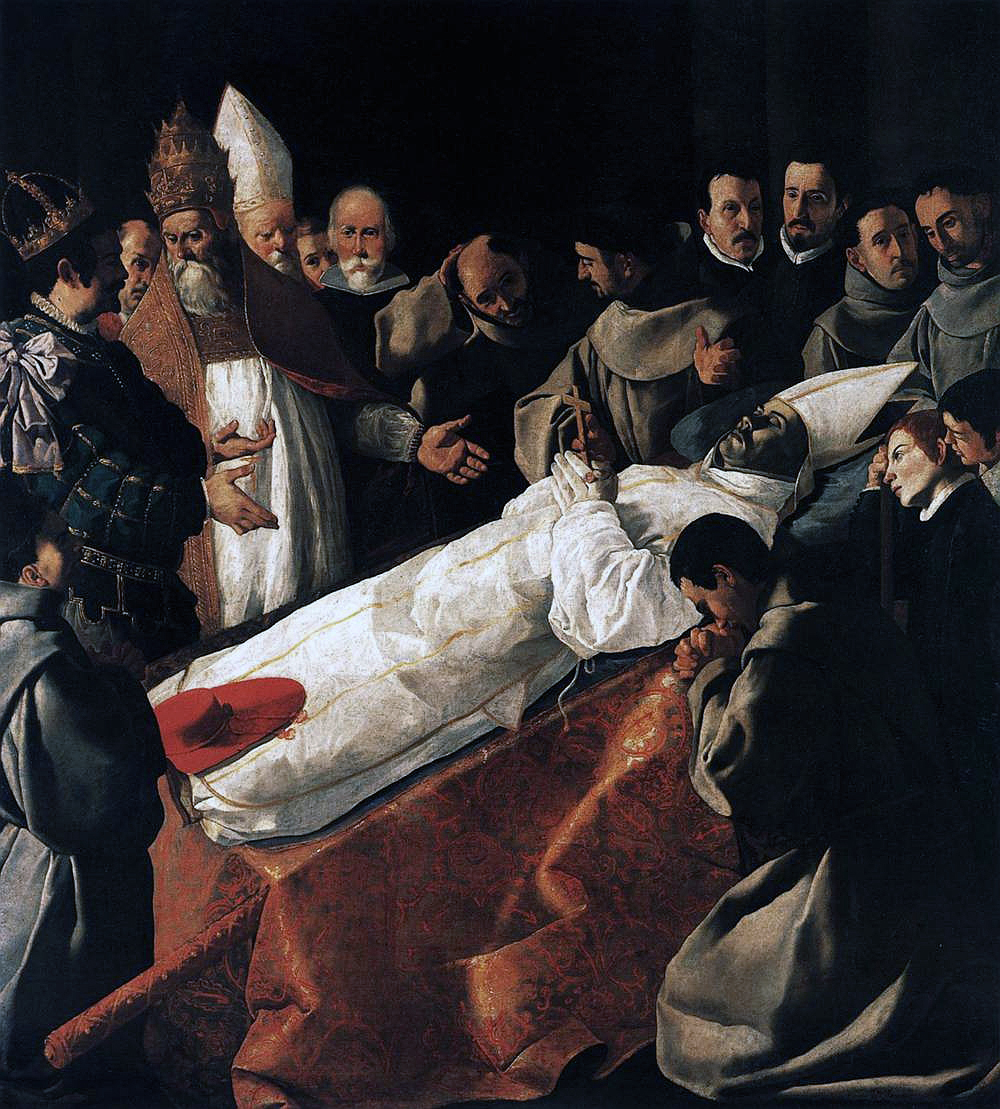
Displaying the Body of Saint Bonaventure (1629) by Francisco de Zurbarán

Displaying the Body of Saint Bonaventure (French: Exposition du corps de saint Bonaventure) is a 1629 oil painting on canvas by the Spanish painter Francisco de Zurbarán, now in the Louvre. Around the body of Saint Bonaventure are figures including James I of Aragon and Pope Gregory X, shown in conversation. It formed part of a series of paintings on the saint's life – the other works are Saint Bonaventure at the Council of Lyon (Louvre), Saint Bonaventure and the Angel (Dresden) and Saint Bonaventure and Saint Thomas Aquinas before a Crucifix (Berlin).
