= 1277 papal election =

Election of Catholic Pope Nicholas III

Papal election 1277

Dates and location
- 30 May – 25 November 1277; Palazzo dei Papi di Viterbo

Key officials
- Dean: Bertrand de Saint-Martin
- Camerlengo: Guillaume de Bray
- Protopriest: Anchero Pantaleone
- Protodeacon: Giovanni Orsini

Elected pope
- Giovanni Orsini; Name taken: Nicholas III
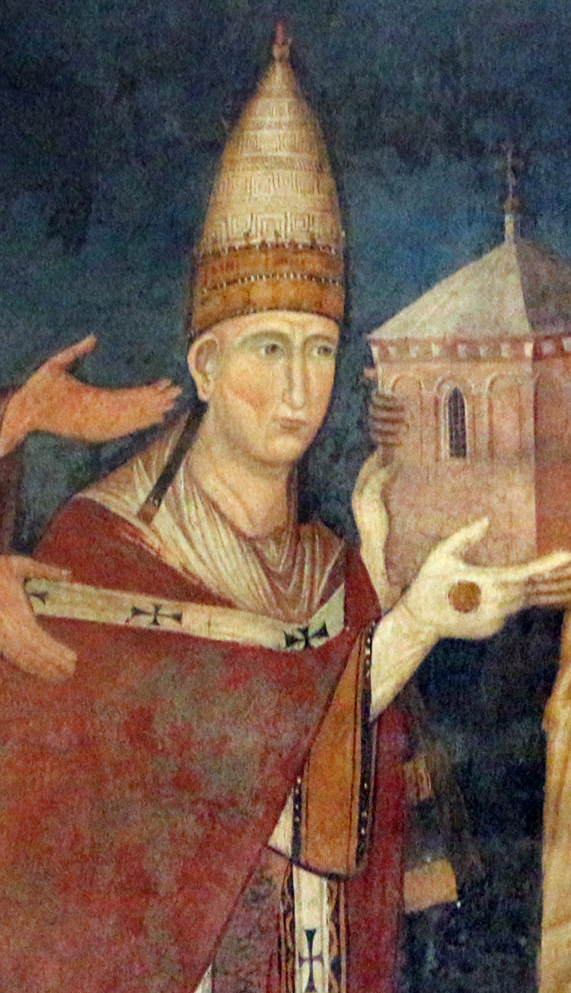

The 1277 papal election (May 30 – November 25), convened in Viterbo after the death of Pope John XXI, was the smallest papal election since the expansion of suffrage to cardinal-priests and cardinal-deacons, with only seven cardinal electors (following the deaths of three popes who had not created cardinals). Because John XXI had revoked Ubi periculum, the papal bull of Pope Gregory X establishing the papal conclave, with his own bull Licet felicis recordationis, the cardinal electors were able to take their time. After six months of deliberation, the cardinals eventually elected their most senior member Giovanni Orsini as Pope Nicholas III. From the end of the election until Nicholas III's first consistory on 12 March 1278, the number of living cardinals—seven—was the lowest in the history of the Roman Catholic Church.

== Cardinal electors ==
The seven cardinal electors were evenly divided between three supporters of Charles of Anjou and three cardinals from prominent Roman families, who opposed the interests of Charles in Italy, and there was one uncommitted cardinal.

Elector	Nationality	Faction	Order and Title	Elevated	Elevator	Notes
Bertrand de Saint-Martin	French	neutral	Cardinal-bishop of Sabina	1273, June 3	Gregory X	Dean of the College of Cardinals
Anchero Pantaleone	French	Angevin	Cardinal-priest of S. Prassede	1262, May 22	Urban IV	Protopriest; Cardinal-nephew
Guillaume de Bray	French	Angevin	Cardinal-priest of S. Marco	1262, May 22	Urban IV	Camerlengo of the Sacred College of Cardinals
Giovanni Orsini	Roman	Roman	Cardinal-deacon of S. Nicola in Carcere Tulliano	1244, May 28	Innocent IV	Protodeacon, archpriest of the patriarchal Vatican Basilica, Inquisitor General, and Protector of the Order of Franciscans; Elected Pope Nicholas III
Giacomo Savelli	Roman	Roman	Cardinal-deacon of S. Maria in Cosmedin	1261, December 17	Urban IV	Future Pope Honorius IV
Goffredo da Alatri	Italian	Angevin	Cardinal-deacon of S. Giorgio in Velabro	1261, December 17	Urban IV	
Matteo Rosso Orsini	Roman	Roman	Cardinal-deacon of S. Maria in Portico	1262, May 22	Urban IV	Nephew of Giovanni Orsini

=== Absentee cardinal ===
Elector	Nationality	Order and Title	Elevated	Elevator	Notes
Simon de Brion	French	Cardinal-priest S. Cecilia	1261, December 17	Urban IV	Papal legate in France; Future Pope Martin IV

== Procedure ==
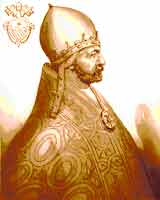
Pope Nicholas III was elected after six months of deadlock.

Initially, the cardinals met only once a day for balloting and returned to their respective habitations after the scrutinies. For two months, voting proceeded uneventfully along national lines with the French and Roman cardinals evenly divided.

After six months the impatient magistrates of Viterbo locked the cardinals in the town hall (once elected, Nicholas III moved the papacy back to Rome).

== Sources ==
- Bower, Archibald. 1766. The History of the Popes.
- Konrad Eubel, Hierarchia Catholica Medii Aevi, vol. I, Leipzig 1913, p. 9
- J.P. Adams (2016), "SEDE VACANTE 1277", California State University Northridge; retrieved: 2 September 2022.
