= Giovanni Visconti (bishop) =

Giovanni Visconti was, according to Lorenzo Cardella, nephew of Pope Gregory X. He was ostensibly created cardinal-bishop of Sabina by his uncle in 1275 and in 1276 was named judge in the case concerning the translation of bishop Giovanni of Potenza to the archbishopric of Monreale, postulated by the cathedral chapter of Monreale. He died in 1277 or 1278.

The modern scholars have concluded that no such cardinal existed in 13th century because the suburbicarian see of Sabina was occupied by Bertrand de Saint-Martin from 1273 until at least 1277. The document of Pope John XXI concerning the postulation of bishop Giovanni of Potenza to the see of Monreale actually refers to cardinal Bertrand and even explicitly calls him by name.

== Sources ==
- The Cardinals of the Holy Roman Church
- Konrad Eubel: Hierarchia Catholica Medii Aevi, vol. 1, Münster 1913
- Richard Stapper: Papst Johannes XXI, Kirchengeschichtliche Studien, Münster 1898
- Richard Sternfeld, Der Kardinal Johann Gaetan Orsini (Papst Nikolaus III.) 1244-1277, Berlin 1905
- Lorenzo Cardella: Memorie storiche de' cardinali della Santa Romana Chiesa, vol. 2, Rome 1793
