= Cardinals created by Nicholas III =

Catholic appointments in 1278

Pope Nicholas III (r. 1277–1280) created nine cardinals in one consistory celebrated on 12 March 1278:

- Ordonho Alvares, Archbishop of Braga – named Cardinal-Bishop of Frascati, † 21 December 1285.
- Bentivenga dei Bentivenghi, O.F.M., Bishop of Todi – named Cardinal-Bishop of Albano, † 25 March 1289.
- Latino Malabranca Orsini, O.P., nephew of Nicholas – named Cardinal-Bishop of Ostia e Velletri,† 10 August 1294
- Robert Kilwardby, O.P., Archbishop of Canterbury – named Cardinal-Bishop of Porto and S. Rufina, † 12 September 1279.
- Gerard de Lessines, Bishop of Auxerre – named cardinal-bishop of Palestrina, † 18 July 1278.
- Gerardo Bianchi – named Cardinal-Priest of SS. XII Apostoli, then cardinal-bishop of Sabina (12 April 1281), † 1 March 1302.
- Girolamo Masci, O.Min. – Minister General of the Franciscans. Named Cardinal-Priest of S. Pudenziana, then cardinal-bishop of Palestrina (12 April 1281) and Pope Nicholas IV (22 February 1288), † 4 April 1292
- Giordano Orsini, brother of Pope Nicholas III – named Cardinal-Deacon of S. Eustachio, † 8 September 1287.
- Giacomo Colonna – named Cardinal-Deacon of S. Maria in Via Lata; excommunicated and deposed on 10 May 1297, restored as Cardinal-Deacon without a title on 15 December 1305, † 14 August 1318.

Most of these new Cardinals were not of the French party, and among them were five members of religious orders. Two died before the next Conclave, which was to take place on the death of Nicholas III in 1280, and the rest had to be terrorized into voting for a candidate of Charles I of Sicily.

== Sources ==
- Konrad Eubel: Hierarchia Catholica Medii Aevi, vol. 1, Münster 1913, pp. 9–10.
- Miranda, Salvador. "Consistories for the creation of Cardinals, 13th Century (1198-1303): Nicholas III (1277-1280)". The Cardinals of the Holy Roman Church. Florida International University.
