= Vicedomino de Vicedominis =

Italian cardinal

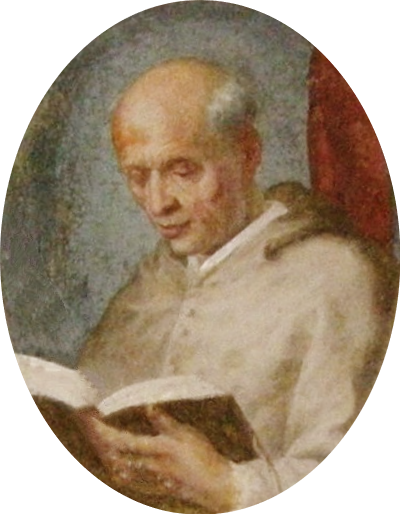

Vicedomino de Vicedominis (c. 1210 – 6 September 1276) was an Italian cardinal.

== Family background ==
Born at Piacenza, he was the nephew of Pope Gregory X, and had been married, with two children. When his wife died, he decided to enter the clerical state. His son Gregory became Provost of Grasse in 1269, and in 1275 he was named Provost of Marseille. The other son had died before 1257.

== Administrator in Provence ==
How he came to be in Provence is unknown, but it is on record that he was in the service of Count Raymond Béringuer V, and then of Charles of Anjou. He had a pension of 50 pounds tournois from Count Raymond, which was continued to him by a diploma of Charles and Beatrice, dated 7 May 1265. One can follow his developing career through a series of charters of Count Raymond. He was Canon of Clermont and Provost of Barjols in 1241. He was sent to Geneva by Count Raymond to strike a treaty of alliance with the Republic of Geneva; in those documents, he is called Judge of the Curia of Count Raymond. In 1243, he had the same title and the same mission in Avignon, which at that time was a free city and not yet the possession of the popes. Count Raymond died in 1245.

On 20 February 1251, he was Treasurer of the Church of Béziers and Chaplain of Pope Innocent IV, who granted him the privilege of holding pontifical dignities, even though he had been married and had children. On 1 May 1251, he went with Guy Foulques (Foucauld, Folcaldi), the future Pope Clement IV (1265-1269), to arrange a treaty of peace between Arles and Count Charles (Charles of Anjou). At the end of 1251 Vicedomino de Vicedominis was Provost of Grasse. On 6 June 1254, he was granted the privilege of holding several benefices at the same time: the Provostship of Grasse, the Precentorship of the Church of Béziers, a Canonry at Clermont, a Canonry at Narbonne, and two parishes which involved the care of souls.

== Archbishop of Aix ==
On 22 July 1257, the election of Vicedomino de Vicedominis to the Archbishopric of Aix was confirmed in Consistory by Pope Alexander IV. He required a dispensation since he had been married and had one son surviving. He was not ordained a priest (it seems) or consecrated bishop, however, until 1258, in the meantime styling himself Archbishop-Elect. From the beginning of his tenure of the See, he was assisted by his relative, Grimier (Grimerius, Grimoard) de Vicedominis, whom he first appointed as an official of his curia, then Archdeacon and Canon supernumerary of the Cathedral, then Vicar-General. Finally, Grimier was Vicedomino's successor as Archbishop of Aix (1274-1282). Amazingly, his promotion was not without turmoil. The Canons of Aix elected Alain of Sisteron as their new archbishop; Bishop Alain had been administering the Church of Aix while Vicedomino was serving at the side of Pope Gregory. But Gregory, residing at Lyons, did not want to confirm him, believing that he would do more usefully as Bishop of Sisteron—an odd judgment considering that Alain was working at Aix, not Sisteron. Pope Gregory, therefore, intervened directly and appointed Grimier.

In 1265, Archbishop Vicedomino followed Charles of Anjou and his wife Beatrice, the youngest daughter of Raymond Berenguer, to Italy, where Charles had been invited to become Senator of Rome and also King of Sicily. In her testament dated 30 June 1266, Queen Beatrice of Sicily, the wife of Charles of Anjou, Comte de Provence and King of Sicily, named Vicedomino one of the executors.

== Cardinal Vicedomino ==
Then, on 3 June 1273, Vicedomino de Vicedominis was one of five cardinals created by his uncle, Pope Gregory X (1271-1276). He was transferred from Aix to the Suburban Roman See of Palestrina. The creation took place during the Ecumenical Council of Vienne, and therefore Vicedomino did not proceed immediately to his new diocese, but instead participated in the Council. When the Council ended, and Pope Gregory began his return journey to Rome, Vicedomino was (unaccountably) not one of the travelling party. The Oath of Fidelity of the King Rudolf mentions seven cardinals as present in Lausanne on 20 October 1275: Petrus Ostiensis, Ancherus Pantaleone of S. Prassede, Guglelmus de Bray of S. Marco, Ottobono Fieschi of S. Adriano, Giacomo Savelli of S. Maria in Cosmedin, Gottifridus de Alatri of S. Giorgio in Velabro, and Mattheus Rosso Orsini of S. Maria in Porticu—but not Vicedomino de Vicedominis, Cardinal Bishop of Palestrina. And when the Pope died at Arezzo on 10 January 1276, only three Cardinal Bishops were with him: Peter of Tarantaise, Peter Juliani and Bertrand de St. Martin—but not Vicedomino de Vicedominis, Cardinal Bishop of Palestrina.

== Conclaves ==
Nonetheless, Vicedomino and eleven other cardinals were present for the opening of the Conclave on 20 January 1276, the first to be held under the regulations promulgated by Gregory X at the Council of Lyons in 1274. The Conclave was held in Arezzo, the place where the pope died, and lasted one day. On 21 January, the Dominican friar, Cardinal Peter of Tarantaise in Savoy, was elected on the first scrutiny and chose the name Innocent V. He was consecrated in Rome in the Vatican Basilica in February 1276. He died on 22 June of the same year. The Annals of Verona report that he was poisoned on orders of King Charles I of Sicily.

The second Conclave of 1276 opened in Rome at the Lateran on 2 July, and lasted for ten days. King Charles had been in the city of Rome since 9 February and was therefore in a position to influence the direction of conclave politics. Since Innocent V had created no new cardinals, the participants were the same as those of the January Conclave. It may occasion little surprise that Cardinal Ottobono Fieschi, the leader of the faction of King Charles, was chosen pope on 11 July, after eight scrutinies, taking the name Adrian V. He was certainly supported by Vicedomino de Vicedominis, a committed member of the French faction. Early in August, partly to escape the heat of Rome in the summer, and partly to deal with pressing problems with King Rudolf, Pope Adrian travelled to Viterbo. There, he died suddenly on 18 August 1276. He had reigned 39 days, but had not been ordained priest, consecrated bishop, or crowned. In those thirty-nine days, however, even before he left the Lateran for Viterbo, he did one important thing: he suspended Gregory X's Constitution that regulated the conclave. He intended, according to all cardinals who were present, not including Vicedomino de Vicedominis, to make adjustments and improvements to the Gregorian document.

The third Conclave of 1276 took place in Viterbo, the city where Pope Adrian V had died. Eleven cardinals participated, only Cardinal Simon de Brion being absent as Legate in France. The date of the opening is unknown because the Constitution of Gregory X had been suspended. Had it been in operation, the Conclave would have begun on 28 or 29 August. It is known, however, that the Conclave did not open as expected, but had to be postponed for several days due to disorders on the part of the people of Viterbo. A subsequent investigation, led by Cardinal the Bishop of Sabina, Bertrand de Saint Martin, charged prelates and other members of the papal Curia with instigating the riots, probably because they did not want to see a repetition of the Conclave of 1268-1271. When things finally settled down and the Conclave began, on the first day of voting, 8 September 1276, the Cardinals elected the Dominican Cardinal Peter Julian of Lisbon, who chose to be called John XXI. Cardinal Vicedomino de Vicedominis did not participate in the scrutiny, since he had died on 6 September.

== Myths ==
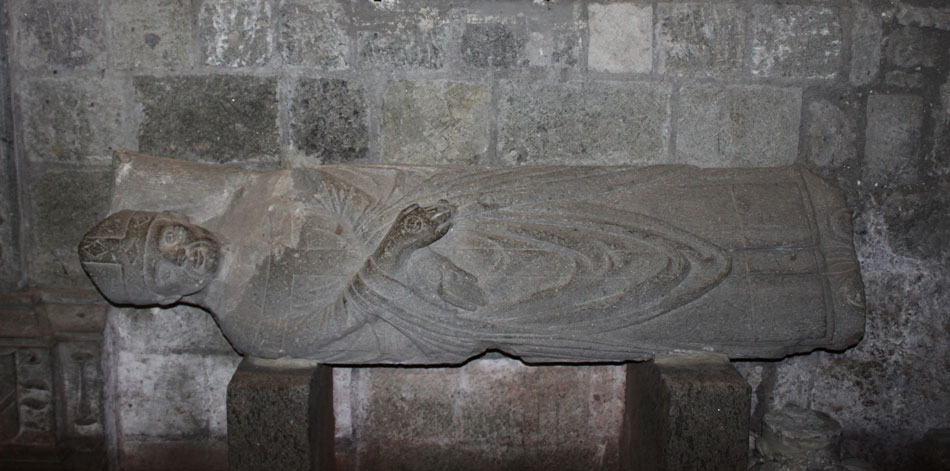
Tomb of Vicedomino in Viterbo

Vicedomino is wrongly said to have become dean of the Sacred College of Cardinals in July 1275.

According to the later accounts, attested for the first time in the 17th century, in the papal election held after the death of Pope Adrian V he was elected to the Papacy on 5 September 1276 and took the name Gregory XI, but having died the following day early in the morning, his election was not recorded as he was never proclaimed. His death was noted in his home town of Piacenza, in the Necrology of the Cathedral, and on the correct day, 6 September, but it records him only as a cardinal, and makes no mention of his Papacy. This story is rejected by many modern historians, who point out that it is unsupported by any contemporary source, and unsupportable by the chronology of the Conclave of August–September 1276. It is also said that he became a member of the Third Order of S. Francis (Franciscan Tertiary), after he was already a Cardinal, and when he was suffering from a disease and in danger of death. But, if he was in danger of death, it seems unlikely that the Cardinals would have chosen Cardinal Vicedomino as pope on 5 September 1276.

The remains of his tomb, reconstructed several times, are in the church of San Francesco at Viterbo.

== Bibliography ==
- J. S. Pitton, Annales de la sainte Eglise d'Aix (Lyon: Mathieu Liberal 1668), pp. 151–157.
- Lorenzo Cardella, Memorie storiche de' Cardinali della Santa Romana Chiesa Tomo secondo (Roma: Pagliarini 1793), pp. 2–3.
- Francesco Cristofori, Le tombe dei pape in Viterbo (Siena 1887), 185-202.
- J.-H. Albanés, Gallia christiana novissima Tome premier: Aix, Apt, Fréjus, Gap, Riez et Sisteron (Montbéliard 1899), pp. 70–73.
