= Pope Nicholas III =

Head of the Catholic Church from 1277 to 1280

- Bishop of Rome
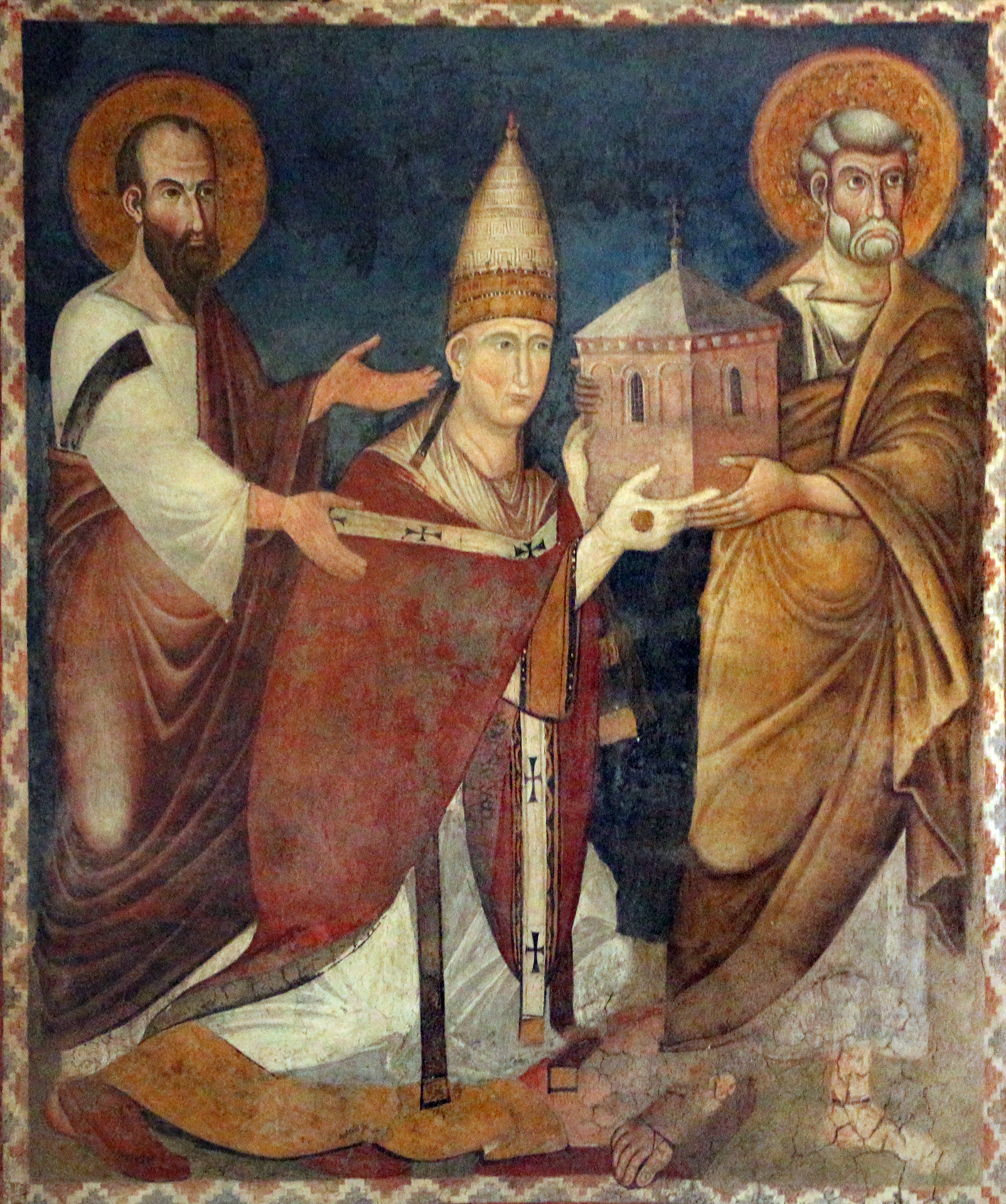
- 13th century fresco in the Sancta Sanctorum (Lateran, Rome) depicting Nicholas III offering the church to Christ
- Church: Catholic Church
- Papacy began: 25 November 1277
- Papacy ended: 22 August 1280
- Predecessor: John XXI
- Successor: Martin IV
- Previous posts: Cardinal-Deacon of San Nicola in Carcere (1244–1277); Archpriest of Saint Peter's Basilica (1276–1277)

Orders
- Created cardinal: 28 May 1244 by Innocent IV

Personal details
- Born: Giovanni Gaetano Orsini c. 1225 Rome, Papal States
- Died: 22 August 1280 (aged 54–55) Viterbo, Papal States
- Coat of arms: Nicholas III's coat of arms

Ordination history of Pope Nicholas III
History
Cardinalate
- Elevated by: Pope Innocent IV
- Date: 28 May 1244
Episcopal succession
Bishops consecrated by Pope Nicholas III as principal consecrator
- Thrugot Thorstensen: 27 December 1277
- Willem van Moerbeke, O.P.: 9 April 1278
- John Peckham, O.F.M.: 19 February 1279
- Heinrich Fleming: 21 March 1279
- William Wickwane: 17 September 1279
- Nicholas Cusack, O.F.M.: 15 May 1280
- William Fraser: 19 May 1280
- Fernando Covarrubias, O.F.M.: Sometime between 21 May 1280 to 22 August 1280

Pope Nicholas III (Latin: Nicolaus III; c. 1225 – 22 August 1280), born Giovanni Gaetano Orsini, was head of the Catholic Church and ruler of the Papal States from 25 November 1277 to his death on 22 August 1280.

He was a Roman nobleman who had served under eight popes, been made Cardinal-Deacon of St. Nicola in Carcere Tulliano by Pope Innocent IV (1243–1254), protector of the Franciscans by Pope Alexander IV (1254–1261), inquisitor-general by Pope Urban IV (1261–64), and succeeded Pope John XXI (1276–1277) after a six-month vacancy in the Holy See resolved in the papal election of 1277, largely through family influence.

== Personal life ==
Giovanni Gaetano Orsini, was born in Rome, a member of the prominent Orsini family of Italy, the eldest son of Roman nobleman Matteo Rosso Orsini by his first wife, Perna Caetani. His father was Lord of Vicovaro, Licenza, Cantalupo, Roccagiovine, Galera, Formello, Castel Sant'Angelo di Tivoli, Nettuno, Civitella, Bomarzo, San Polo and Castelfoglia, of Nerola from 1235; Lord of Mugnano, Santangelo and Monterotondo; Senator of Rome 1241–1243.

His brother Giordano was named Cardinal Deacon of San Eustachio by Nicholas III on 12 March 1278. His brother Gentile became Lord of Mugnano, Penna, Nettuno and Pitigliano. Another brother, Matteo Rosso of Montegiordano, was Senator of Rome (probably) in 1279, War Captain of Todi, and Podestà of Siena in 1281. There were five other younger brothers and two sisters.

The Orsini family had already produced several popes: Stephen II (752–757), Paul I (757–767) and Celestine III (1191–1198).

He did not, as some scholars used to think, study at Paris—though his nephew did. His career shows no indication that he was a legal professional or a theologian. He never became a priest, until he became pope in 1277.

== Cardinalate ==
Giovanni Gaetano Orsini was one of a dozen men created a cardinal by Pope Innocent IV (Sinibaldo Fieschi) in his first Consistory for the creation of cardinals, on Saturday, May 28, 1244, and was assigned the Deaconry of San Nicola in Carcere. He was a Canon and Prebendary of York, and also of Soissons and Laon. In the summer of 1244, he was one of five cardinals who fled to Genoa with Pope Innocent IV. He was at Lyon, and was present in June and July for the Ecumenical Council of Lyon. Cardinal Orsini and the Curia did not return to Italy until May 1251—after the death of Emperor Frederick II Hohenstaufen. After spending the summer in Genoa, Milan and Brescia, they finally reached Perugia in November 1251, where the Papal Court resided continuously until April 1253.

The Curia returned to Rome in mid-October, where Pope and Curia resided continually until the end of April, 1254. In May they went on pilgrimage to Assisi, then visited Anagni, where the Court stayed from June until the second week in October, when they went off in pursuit of Manfred, Hohenstaufen regent of the Kingdom of Sicily. At the beginning of December, the Battle of Foggia took place, and the papal army was routed. Innocent IV died in Naples, where he had taken refuge, on 7 December 1254, and the meeting to elect his successor was therefore held in Naples in the palace in which he had died. Voting began on Friday, 11 December, with ten of the twelve cardinals present, but no candidate received the required votes. But on Saturday, 12 December, Cardinal Rinaldo dei Conti di Segni, the nephew of Pope Gregory IX, who had a reputation of a conciliator, was elected pope. He chose to be called Alexander IV and was crowned on Sunday, December 20, 1254, in the Cathedral of Naples. As for Cardinal Giovanni Gaetano Orsini, in his first eleven and a half years as a cardinal, he had only spent six months in the city of Rome. A peripatetic Curia had its disadvantages.

Pope Alexander IV and the Curia continued to live in Naples, until the first week of June 1255 when they returned to Anagni, and it was not until mid-November that the Pope was back in Rome. There the Curia stayed until the end of May, 1256, when it was off to Anagni for the summer, until the beginning of December. The problem was that Rome was in the hands of Senator Brancaleone degli Andalo, Count of Casalecchio, and the Ghibellines since 1252, and Alexander was repeatedly driven out by unruly mobs. Rome was home again until the end of May, 1257, until the summer vacation at Viterbo began. The vacation lasted until the end of October, 1258, when the Court visited Anagni again; they stayed until the beginning of November, 1260. The Pope then was able to reside at the Lateran until the first week of May, 1261, when the Court was off to Viterbo again. Alexander IV died at Viterbo on 25 May 1261. Nineteen months were spent in Rome, out of a total of seventy-eight. Alexander had created no new cardinals, and so the Electoral meeting following his death had only eight participants. The Election was a long-drawn-out one, lasting from 25 May to 29 August 1261. Unable to agree on one of themselves, the Cardinals chose Jacques Pantaléon, the Latin Patriarch of Jerusalem, who, since 1255, was Papal Legate with the Crusade in the Holy Land. He became Pope Urban IV, and was crowned at Viterbo on 4 September 1261.

Cardinal Orsini was named General Inquisitor by Urban IV on November 2, 1262, the first known Grand Inquisitor.

Cardinal Orsini attended the first Conclave of 1268–1271, and was one of the cardinals who signed the letter of complaint against the authorities and people of Viterbo for their treatment of the cardinals and the Curia. He was one of the six cardinals who were chosen by the rest of the Sacred College on September 1, 1271, to select a compromise candidate for election as pope. He was therefore instrumental in bringing to the papal throne the Archdeacon of Liège, Teobaldo Visconti, who was not a cardinal, and who was not even in Italy, but in the Holy Land on crusade. He traveled with the Curia to France in 1273, and was present at the Ecumenical Council of Lyon. He was not one of the cardinals in the suite of Pope Gregory X when he left Lyon in 1275 to return to Rome, nor was he at Arezzo where the Pope died on 10 January 1276, before reaching the city. He did not attend the first conclave which began on 20 January 1276, and concluded the next day with the election of Peter of Tarantaise, who became Pope Innocent V. Pope Innocent V (Peter of Tarantaise) died in Rome at the Lateran, on 22 June 22, 1276.

The second Conclave of 1276 began, therefore, according to the rules set down by Pope Gregory X, on July 2. Thirteen cardinals were present, including Giovanni Gaetano Orsini. King Charles I of Sicily acted as the Governor of the Conclave, in which position he is said to have been rigorous, but understandably partisan in favor of the French faction. Cardinal Ottobuono Fieschi of Genoa was elected on July 11 and chose the name Pope Adrian V. He lived only thirty-nine days longer, dying at Viterbo, where he had gone to meet King Rudolf and avoid the summer heat of Rome. According to Bernardus Guidonis, he was never ordained priest, consecrated bishop or crowned pope (nondum promotus in sacerdotem nec coronatus nec consecratus). His one memorable act was to suspend the Constitution of Gregory X "Ubi periculum" which regulated conclaves. He intended, on the advice of his cardinals, to improve Gregory's regulations. Cardinal Orsini was present at the discussion and decision. Shortly after his accession, moreover, Pope Adrian V had wanted King Charles I of Sicily to come to Viterbo to carry out the usual fealty, and sent the Suburbicarian Bishop of Sabina (Bertrand de Saint Martin); Cardinal Giovanni (Orsini), Cardinal Deacon of St. Nicola in Carcere Tulliano; and Cardinal Giacomo (Savelli), Cardinal Deacon of Santa Maria in Cosmedin, to effect his wishes. Charles arrived in Viterbo from Rome on July 24. Unfortunately, Pope Adrian died, on August 18, leaving his negotiations with King Charles unfinished.

The third Conclave of 1276 began at the beginning of September in Viterbo, where Adrian V had died. The opening ceremonies, which should have taken place on August 29, had to be delayed for several days because of the riotous behavior of the people of Viterbo. Since Pope Adrian had created no new cardinals, the number of cardinals was twelve; Cardinal Simon de Brion was still in France, serving as Papal Legate. Once the tumults had been put down, however, the cardinals did their business quickly. On September 8, 1276, the senior Cardinal-Bishop, Peter Julian of Lisbon, was elected on the first ballot. He chose to be called John XXI, and on September 20 he was crowned at the Cathedral of San Lorenzo in Viterbo by Cardinal Giovanni Caetano Orsini. Since John XXI was already a bishop, there was no ordination or consecration necessary. He was the fourth pope of 1276. On 18 October, Cardinal Giovanni Gaetano Orsini was appointed Archpriest of St. Peter's, in place of Cardinal Riccardo Annibaldi, who had recently died, and who may have been too ill to participate in the Conclave or the Coronation.

Pope Adrian V's suspension of the regulations of Gregory X, however imperfect they may have been, was under attack. Some critics even claimed that the cardinals who vouched for the truth of the suspension, including Cardinal Peter Julian, were liars, or that the revocation was uncanonical. These were probably the same troublemakers in the Curia who had instigated the disturbances that delayed the Conclave. John XXI immediately struck back, on 30 September 1276, making it perfectly clear that the suspension had taken place and that it was valid. Ptolemy of Lucca states that the issue of this bull of revocation by John XXI was made at the suggestion of Cardinal Giovanni Caetano Orsini. The negotiations which Cardinal Giovanni Caetano had been engaged in with King Charles I were brought to a completion, and Charles swore his oath of fealty to Pope John on 7 October 1276. It appeared that his reign was going to be a successful one, when one day in mid-May 1277, while the Pope was in a new room which he had just had built in the Episcopal Palace in Viterbo, suddenly the roof caved in. There was nothing suspicious about this, since the palace had been under construction since 1268 and was still being worked on. The Pope was severely injured from the falling stones and timber. He lingered in pain for several days (three, or six), and died on 20 May 1277, exactly eight months after his coronation. He had named no cardinals.

Yet another Conclave took place in Viterbo, therefore, with seven cardinals in attendance. Cardinal Simon de Brion was still in France as papal legate. But this was not an easy conclave. Three of the electors belonged to the Angevin faction, and three opposed it. The only surviving Cardinal-Bishop, the Benedictine Bertrand de Saint Martin, wavered back and forth, providing little leadership. The Conclave therefore went on for more than five and a half months. Finally, on the Feast of S. Catherine, 25 November 1277, Cardinal Giovanni Gaetano Orsini was elected. He chose the name Nicholas III. The new pope set out immediately for Rome. He was ordained a priest on December 18, consecrated a bishop on December 19, and crowned on the Feast of S. Stephen, 26 December. His election portended serious difficulties, for he was not a candidate of King Charles of Sicily. Quite the contrary, he believed that King Charles had entirely too much influence in church affairs and in the operation of the Papal States.

== Activities as pope ==
=== Politics ===
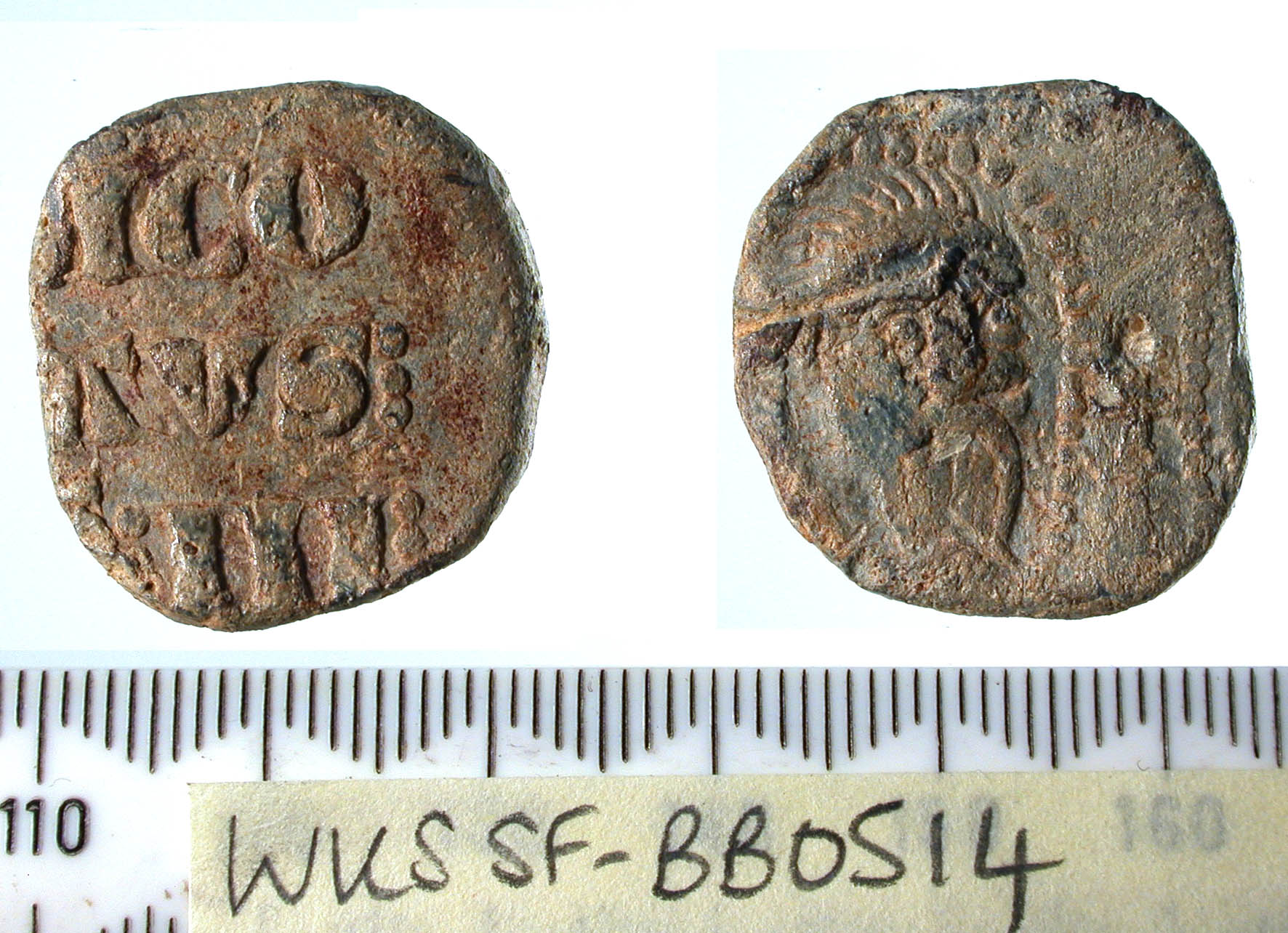
Bulla of Nicholas III

The lands under direct papal rule were threatened by surrounding powers. In the second quarter of the 13th century, they were threatened by the expansionist policies of the Emperor Frederick II, who aimed to unite his inheritance in the south (Sicily and southern Italy) with his acquisition of the Holy Roman Empire in northern Italy. He spent a great deal of time and energy attempting to gain control over Lombardy and Tuscany, which brought him into direct conflict with the Papacy. Frederick was repeatedly excommunicated by one pope after another. In order to drive off the Hohenstaufen, the Papacy contrived a deal with the brother of Louis IX of France, Charles of Anjou, Count of Provence, who was invited to Italy to assume the crown of Sicily and be a counterweight against the Empire. He was too successful, however, and the Papacy found itself in the deadly embrace of the Angevins. Nicholas' prime goal was to loosen Charles I's grip on the Papacy, Rome, and the lands of the Church.

Nicholas' pontificate, though brief, was marked by several important events. He greatly strengthened the papal position in Italy. On 1 October 1273, Rudolph I of Habsburg, the godson of Frederick II, had been elected King of Germany and King of the Romans. Pope Gregory X had recognized him as King, after some hard negotiation, but the imperial title and coronation were withheld. Pope Nicholas was willing to negotiate, but he refused to crown Rudolf as Emperor until Rudolph had acknowledged all the claims of the Church, including many that were quite dubious. The concordat with Rudolph I of Habsburg was concluded in May 1278. In it the city of Bologna, the Romagna, and the exarchate of Ravenna were guaranteed to the papacy. According to the chronographer Bartholomew of Lucca (Ptolemy of Lucca), he discussed with Rudolph, in general terms at least, the splitting the Holy Roman Empire into four separate kingdoms – Lombardy, Burgundy, Tuscia and Germany – where Rudolph's kingdom would be made hereditary and he himself would be recognized as Holy Roman Emperor.

Nicholas III was even able to persuade King Charles I of Naples and Sicily to give up his position as Roman Senator in 1278, at the conclusion of ten years of tenure, as well as the position of Papal Vicar for Tuscany. In July 1278, Nicholas III issued an epoch-making constitution for the government of Rome, Fundamenta militantis which forbade foreigners from taking civil office. It depends for its justification not only on the biblical phrase, "Tu es Petrus, et super hanc petram aedificabo ecclesiam meam" (Matthew 16:18), but also on the forged Donations of Constantine.

=== Ecclesiastical ===
Nicholas' father had been a personal friend of Francis of Assisi, and he himself had to focus much of his attention on the Franciscan order. More than 165 of his bulls and letters address the subject. Most importantly, he issued the papal bull Exiit qui seminat on 14 August 1279, to settle the strife within the order between the parties of strict and relaxed observance.

He repaired the Lateran Palace and the Vatican at enormous cost, and erected a beautiful country house at Soriano nel Cimino near Viterbo, where he died of a cardiovascular event (sources differ on whether it was a heart attack or a stroke).

=== Nepotism ===
Nicholas III, though a man of learning noted for his strength of character, was known for his excessive nepotism. He elevated three of his closest relatives to the cardinalate and gave others important positions. This nepotism was lampooned both by Dante and in contemporary cartoons, depicting him in his fine robes with three "little bears" (orsetti, a pun on the family name) hanging on below.

=== Cardinals ===
See: Cardinals created by Nicholas III

=== Death ===
Pope Nicholas III was stricken ill quite unexpectedly. The Curia was residing at the time in the city of Viterbo. Pope Nicholas was at his country retreat at Castro Soriano. According to the Chronicon Parmense he was suddenly deprived of consciousness and movement (privatus subito omni sensu et motu). Bartholomeus (Ptolemy) of Lucca says, subito factus apoplecticus, sine loquela moritur ('suddenly stricken with apoplexy, he died without speaking'). Nicholas was unable to make his confession, and died at his palace at Castro Soriano, in the diocese of Viterbo, on 22 August 1280. He had been pope for two years, eight months, and twenty-eight days. His remains were taken to Rome, where he was buried in the Vatican Basilica, in the Chapel of S. Nicholas. There was an alternative story circulating, as was frequently the case in the sudden deaths of medieval and renaissance popes—that the pope had been poisoned.

According to the biography of the kabbalist Abraham Abulafia, the latter had gone to Rome in 1280 in order to convert Pope Nicholas III to Judaism. The Pope issued orders to "burn the fanatic" as soon as he reached Soriano, and the stake was erected in preparation close to the inner gate; but Abulafia set out for Soriano all the same and reached there August 22. While passing through the outer gate, he heard that the Pope had died from an apoplectic stroke during the preceding night.

== Portrayal in The Inferno ==
Dante, in The Inferno (of the Divine Comedy), talks briefly to Nicholas III, who was condemned to spend eternity in the Third Bolgia of the Eighth Circle of Hell, reserved for those who committed simony, the ecclesiastical crime of paying for offices or positions in the hierarchy of a church.

In Dante's story, the simoniacs are placed head-first in holes, flames burning on the soles of their feet (Canto XIX). Nicholas was the chief sinner in these pits, which is demonstrated by the height of the flames on his feet. At first he mistakes Dante for Pope Boniface VIII. When the confusion is cleared up, Nicholas informs Dante that he foresees the damnation (for simony) not only of Boniface VIII, but also Clement V, an even more corrupt pope.

== See also ==
- Cardinals created by Nicholas III
- List of popes

== Bibliography ==
- Jules Gay (editor), Les registres de Nicolas III (1277–1280): Nicolaus III. Recueil des bulles de ce pape publiées et analysées d'après les manuscrits originaux des archives du Vatican (1898) (Bibliothèque des Écoles françaises d'Athènes et de Rome Sér. 2, Volume 14).
- Fr. Joannis Hyacinthi Sbarale, Bullarium Franciscanum Romanorum Pontificum constitutiones, epistolas... tribus ordinibus Minorum, Clarissarum, et Poenitentium a... Sancto Francisco institutis concessa... Tomus III (Roma: typis Sacrae congregationis de Propaganda fide, 1765), pp. 279–468. (The Franciscan collection of papal bulls, 165 documents)
- Thomas Ripoll and Antonino Bremond (editors), Bullarium ordinis ff. praedicatorum Tomus primus (Roma: ex Typographia Hieronymi Mainardi, 1729), pp. 553–575. (The Dominican collection of papal bulls, 19 documents)
- A. Demski, Papst Nikolaus III. Eine Monographie (Münster 1903).
- Richard Sternfeld, Der Kardinal Johann Gaëtan Orsini (Papst Nikolaus III) 1244–1277 (Berlin 1905).
- Ferdinand Gregorovius (tr. Annie Hamilton), History of the City of Rome in the Middle Ages Volume V, part 2 (London: George Bell, 1906), pp. 477–491.
- Daniel Waley, The Papal State in the Thirteenth Century (London: Macmillan 1961), pp. 189–201.
- F. Elizondo, "Bulla "Exiit qui seminat" Nicolai III (14 Augusti 1279)", Laurentianum 4 (1963), pp. 59–119.
- Charles T. Davis, "Roman Patriotism and Republican Propaganda: Ptolemy of Lucca and Pope Nicholas III", Speculum 50 (1975), pp. 411–433.
- F. Allegrezza, Organizzazione del potere e dinamiche familiari. Gli Orsini dal Duecento agli inizi del Quattrocento (Roma 1998), pp. 15–6, 19–22, 36–41.
- S. Carocci, Il nepotismo nel medioevo. Papi, cardinali e famiglie nobili (Roma 1999), pp. 124–127.
- Kristin A. Triff, "Rhetoric and Romanitas in Thirteenth-Century Rome: Nicholas III and the Sancta Sanctorum", Artibus et Historiae Vol. 30, No. 60 (2009), pp. 71–106.
- Erika Starr Nelson, The religious, political, and personal aspirations of Pope Nicholas III in the frescoes at Old St. Peter's and the Sancta Sanctorum (Austin Texas, USA: University of Texas at Austin, 2002).

Catholic Church titles
Preceded by John XXI	Pope; November 25, 1277 – August 22, 1280	Succeeded by Martin IV
