= Ubi periculum =

Papal bull, defining how to elect a new pope

Ubi periculum is a papal bull promulgated by Pope Gregory X during the Second Council of Lyon on 7 July 1274 that established the papal conclave format as the method for selecting a pope, specifically the confinement and isolation of the cardinals in conditions designed to speed them to reach a broad consensus. Its title, as is traditional for such documents, is taken from the opening words of the original Latin text, Ubi periculum maius intenditur, 'Where greater danger lies'. Its adoption was supported by the hundreds of bishops at that council over the objections of the cardinals. The regulations were formulated in response to the tactics used against the cardinals by the magistrates of Viterbo during the protracted papal election of 1268–1271, which took almost three years to elect Gregory X. In requiring that the cardinals meet in isolation, Gregory was not innovating but implementing a practice that the cardinals had either adopted on their own initiative or had forced upon them by civil authorities. After later popes suspended the rules of Ubi periculum and several were elected in traditional elections rather than conclaves, Pope Boniface VIII incorporated Ubi periculum into canon law in 1298.

== Background ==
The goal of Ubi periculum was to limit dilatory tactics and distractions within papal elections, and outside intrusions which might impinge upon the freedom of the electors; it was certainly intended to produce faster outcomes, and, by making the rules more explicit and detailed, to reduce the chances of schism and disputed elections. The imposition of monastic-style modes of living inside the conclave may also have been intended to lift the minds of the electors out of the everyday business of governing the church, and focus their attention on the spiritual importance of their activity.

At five of the nine papal elections that were held between 1198 and 1271, inclusive, the participating cardinals had worked in isolation under physical constraints that they chose or had forced on them. (Note: The five elections were those of 1198, 1216 (in Perugia), 1227, 1241, and 1261 (Viterbo).) In 1198 they sequestered themselves with the rationale that they needed "to be free and safe in their deliberations". In 1241, Rome was under siege and civic officials isolated the cardinals to force the prompt election of a pope who could negotiate with the city's attackers. For the three elections where the cardinals were sequestered in Rome, they used the same location, the Septizodium, as if the practice were becoming traditional. At the most recent, lengthy election in Viterbo, the local authorities had not held the cardinals incommunicado, but had restricted their movements and controlled their access to food. In other respects the procedures established by Ubi periculum appear to have derived from the election procedures of the Dominican constitution of 1228 as well as the communes of Venice (1229) and Piacenza (1233).

== Provisions ==
Gregory first required that procedures already established be maintained, citing specifically those of Alexander III, which meant that election requires the votes of two-thirds of the cardinals present. In Ubi periculum Gregory specified further that:

- upon the death of a pope, all magistracies and offices cease their functions, except for the Major Penitentiary and the Minor Penitentiaries, and the Camerlengo of the Holy Roman Church
- the meeting for the election of a pope should be held where the pope and his curia were residing when the pope died, or in the nearest city in the diocese, but not until ten days have elapsed
- men of every order and condition are eligible candidates
- cardinals may not cast votes in absentia
- late arrivals shall be admitted and no cardinal shall be denied entry, not even if he be excommunicated
- none may leave until the election is concluded, except on account of illness
- the cardinals should be enclosed incommunicado in the palace where the pope died, carefully guarded, each accompanied by one or, if they are ill, two servants
- the cardinals should live in common, their shared accommodations should have no interior walls
- the cardinals are forbidden to engage in politics or bribery or deal-making, and must restrict themselves to the election at hand
- if a pope has not been elected after three days, the cardinals are permitted only one dish at their meals; after eight days only bread, wine and water
- enforcement of these rules–and no additional restrictions of their own devising–is delegated to the rulers and officials of the city where the election is held

== Impact ==
The first election following Ubi periculum observed its rules and took only one day, 20–21 January 1276, to elect Innocent V. The application of Ubi periculum, however, was suspended by his successor Pope Adrian V in consultation with the cardinals in order to make adjustments based on the conclave of January 1276, an effort that ended with Adrian's death just thirty-nine days after his election. His successor John XXI revoked Ubi periculum on 20 September 1276, announced he would issue a substitute set of regulations, but failed to do so before his death in May 1277. The elections–not proper conclaves–of 1277, 1280–1281, 1287–1288, and 1292–1294 were long and drawn out, lasting 7, 6, 11, and 27 months respectively. (Note: The suspension of Ubi periculum contributed to the length of these elections, allowing greater interference by the Kings of Sicily, Charles I and Charles II, as did the close contest between two factions in the College and the small number of cardinals involved.) Pope Celestine V, a Benedictine monk who had not been a cardinal, reinstituted the rules of Ubi periculum. Unlike most of his predecessors, he was free to act independently rather than court the support of the cardinals. He was elected in July 1294, reintroduced the rules in September, and abdicated in December. (Note: Celestine restored the rules of Ubi periculum in three papal bulls: Quia in futurorum on 28 September 1294, Pridem tum nobiscum on 27 October 1294 and Constitutionem felicis recordationis on 10 December 1294.) Pope Benedict XI, elected in 1303 at the second conclave to follow Celestine's withdrawal, documented how the conclave that elected him followed Ubi periculum precisely.

In 1311 Pope Clement V reaffirmed the rules of Ubi periculum in Ne Romani. He reiterated that the power of the College remained strictly limited during an interregnum and authorized local diocesan authorities in whose jurisdiction a conclave met to force the cardinals to adhere to conclave procedures.
