= Pope Innocent V =

Head of the Catholic Church in 1276

Pope Blessed Innocent V
- Bishop of Rome
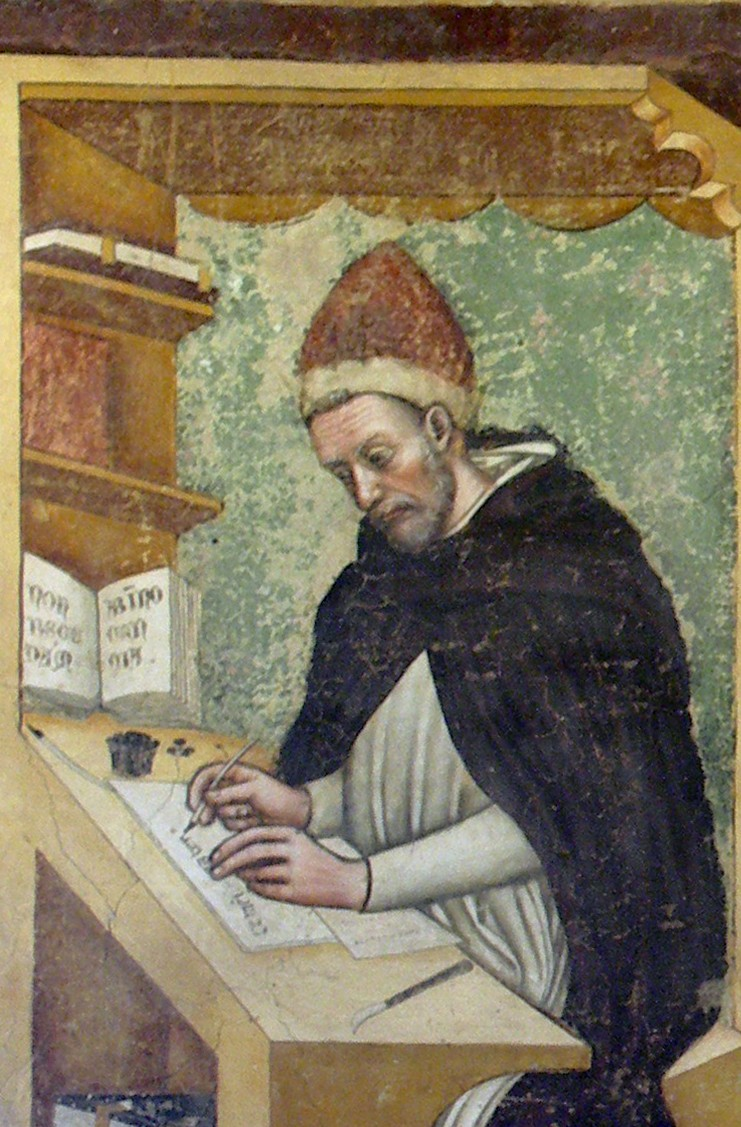
- Portrait by Tommaso da Modena, c. 1352
- Church: Catholic Church
- Papacy began: 21 January 1276
- Papacy ended: 22 June 1276
- Predecessor: Gregory X
- Successor: Adrian V
- Previous posts: Archbishop of Lyon (1272–1273); Cardinal-Bishop of Ostia e Velletri (1273–1276); Major Penitentiary (1273–1276)

Orders
- Ordination: c. 1259
- Consecration: 1272
- Created cardinal: 3 June 1273 by Gregory X

Personal details
- Born: Pierre de Tarentaise c. 1225 Near Champagny-en-Vanoise or La Salle, County of Savoy, Kingdom of Burgundy-Arles, Holy Roman Empire
- Died: 22 June 1276 (aged 50–51) Rome, Papal States
- Coat of arms: Innocent V's coat of arms

Sainthood
- Feast day: 22 June
- Venerated in: Catholic Church
- Title as Saint: Blessed
- Beatified: 9 March 1898; Rome, Kingdom of Italy by Pope Leo XIII
- Attributes: Dominican vestments; Papal vestments; Papal tiara; Book

Pope Innocent V (Latin: Innocentius V; c. 1225 – 22 June 1276), born Pierre de Tarentaise, was head of the Catholic Church and leader of the Papal States from 21 January until his death on 22 June 1276.

A member of the Order of Preachers, he acquired a reputation as an effective preacher. He held one of the two "Dominican Chairs" at the University of Paris, and was instrumental in helping with drawing up the "program of studies" for the Order. In 1269, Peter of Tarentaise was Provincial of the French Province of Dominicans. He was a close collaborator of Pope Gregory X, who named him Bishop of Ostia and raised him to cardinal in 1273.

Upon the death of Gregory in 1276, Peter was elected pope, taking the name Innocent V and becoming the first pope elected in a papal conclave. He died about five months later, but during his brief tenure facilitated a peace between Genoa and King Charles I of Sicily. Pope Innocent V was beatified in 1898 by Pope Leo XIII.

== Early life ==
Pierre de Tarentaise was born around 1225 near Moûtiers in the Tarentaise region of the County of Savoy. An alternative popular hypothesis, however, suggests that he was born in La Salle, in the Aosta Valley, in what is now Italy. Both places were then part of the Kingdom of Arles in the Holy Roman Empire, but now the first is in southeastern France and the second in northwestern Italy. Another hypothesis, favored by some French scholars, is that Peter originated in Tarantaise in Burgundy, or Tarantaise in the Department of the Loire in the Arrondissement of Saint-Etienne. In early life, around 1240, Peter joined the Dominican Order at their convent in Lyons. In the summer of 1255, he was transferred to the studium generale in the Convent of S. Jacques in Paris. This move was essential for someone who was likely to study at the University of Paris. He obtained the degree of Master of Theology, and quickly acquired great fame as a preacher.

== Professor and provincial ==
Between 1259 and 1264, Peter held the "Chair of the French", one of the two chairs (professorships) that were allocated to the Dominicans.

In 1259, he took part in the General Chapter of the Dominican Order at Valenciennes, under the leadership of the Master General, Humbertus de Romans, either due to his status as a Master at Paris or as an elected Definitor (delegate) for the province of France. Peter participated together with Albert the Great, Thomas Aquinas, Bonushomo Britto, and Florentius. This General Chapter established a ratio studiorum, or program of studies, which was to be implemented for the entire Dominican Order, that featured the study of philosophy as a preparative for those not sufficiently trained to study theology. This innovation initiated the tradition of Dominican scholastic philosophy which was to be put into practice in every Dominican convent, if possible, for example, in 1265 at the Order's studium provinciale at the convent of Santa Sabina in Rome. Each convent was expected to have an elected Lector to supervise the preparative studies and an elected Master for theological studies. In the next year he was assigned the title of Preacher General.

In 1264 a new Master General of the Order of Preachers was elected, John of Vercelli. It was taken as an opportunity to engage in some academic politics, since Humbertus de Romans, Peter's patron, was dead. One hundred and eight of Peter's statements in his Commentary on the Sentences of Peter Lombard were denounced as heretical. But, though Peter withdrew from his professorship, John of Vercelli appointed Thomas Aquinas to write a defense of the 108 propositions. Peter's reputation was such that he was immediately elected Provincial of the French Province for a three-year term (1264–1267). He was granted his release from office at the General Chapter, which was held in Bologna in May, 1267. At the conclusion of his term, and after Thomas of Aquinas' rejoinder to his critics was circulated, Peter returned to his chair at the University of Paris (1267). In 1269 he was reelected to the office of Provincial of the French Province, and he held the post until he was named Archbishop of Lyons.

On 6 June 1272, Pope Gregory X himself named Peter of Tarantaise to be Archbishop of Lyons, a post he held until he was appointed to be Bishop of Ostia. It is said, however, that Peter was never consecrated. He did, however, take the oath of fealty in early December, 1272, to King Philip III of France. Pope Gregory himself arrived in Lyons in mid-November, 1273, intent upon bringing as many prelates as possible to his planned ecumenical council. He met immediately with King Philip III of France. Their conversations were obviously harmonious, since Philip ceded to the Church the Comtat Venaissin, which he had inherited from his uncle Alphonse, Count of Toulouse. The Second Council of Lyons opened on 1 May 1274. The first session was held on Monday, 7 May. The principal items on the agenda were the Crusade, and the reunion of the Eastern and Western Churches.

== Cardinal Bishop of Ostia ==
Peter of Tarantaise was elevated to the cardinalate on 3 June 1273, in a Consistory held at Orvieto by Pope Gregory X, and named Bishop of the suburbicarian See of Ostia. He participated in the Second Ecumenical Council of Lyons. During the council, he sang the Funeral Mass and delivered the sermon at the funeral of Cardinal Bonaventure, Bishop of Albano, who had died on 15 July 1274, and was buried on the same day in the Church of the Franciscans in Lyons. Pope Gregory, the Fathers of the Council and the Roman Curia all attended. After the conclusion of the council, Pope Gregory spent the autumn and winter in Lyons. He and his suite left Lyons in May 1275, leaving Vienne shortly after 30 September 1275, and arriving in Lausanne on 6 October. It was in Lausanne that met the Emperor-elect Rudolph, King of the Romans, and on 20 October received the King's oath of fealty. There were seven cardinals with the Pope at the time, and their names are mentioned in the record of the oath-taking: Petrus Ostiensis, Ancherus Pantaleone of S. Prassede, Guglelmus de Bray of S. Marco, Ottobono Fieschi of S. Adriano, Giacomo Savelli of S. Maria in Cosmedin, Gottifridus de Alatri of S. Giorgio in Velabro, and Matteo Rosso Orsini of S. Maria in Porticu. The party reached Milan on Tuesday, 12 November 1275, and Florence on 18 December. Though the papal party reached Arezzo in time for Christmas, the Pope was weak and ill. The stay in Arezzo was prolonged until Gregory X died, on 10 January 1276. Only three cardinals were at his deathbed: Peter of Tarantaise, Peter Giuliani of Tusculum, and Bertrand de Saint-Martin of Sabina, all cardinal-bishops. According to the Constitution "Ubi Periculum" which had been approved by the Council of Lyons, the Conclave to elect his successor was to begin ten days after the pope's death.

== Papacy: January—June, 1276 ==
=== Conclave ===
After the required ten days had passed, the Cardinals assembled on the Vigil of St. Agnes (20 January) to hear the customary Mass of the Holy Spirit. There were twelve cardinals present. Two cardinals, Simon de Brion, who was Papal Legate in France, and Giovanni Gaetano Orsini, did not attend. The next morning, 21 January, Cardinal Peter of Tarantaise was the unanimous choice of the electors, on the first ballot (scrutiny). He was the first Dominican to become Pope. He chose the pontifical name of "Innocent". His decision was to be crowned in Rome, which had not seen a pope since the departure of Gregory X in the third week of June, 1272. By 7 February the Papal Curia had reached Viterbo. King Charles of Naples rode up to Viterbo to meet the new Pope and escort him to Rome. On 22 February 1276, the Feast of S. Peter's Chair, Pope Innocent was crowned in the Vatican Basilica by Cardinal Giovanni Gaetano Orsini.

=== Actions and policies ===
On 2 March 1276, Pope Innocent granted King Charles I of Naples the privilege of retaining the Senatorship of Rome, the government of the city, and the Rectorship of Tuscia. In a letter of 4 March, the Pope testifies that King Charles had sworn fealty for the Kingdom of Naples and of Sicily. On 9 March, he wrote to Rudolf, King of the Romans, begging him not to come to Italy, and if he had already started his journey, to break it off, until an agreement between him and the Papacy could be finalized. This meant that Rudolf's coronation, which had been agreed to by Gregory X, would not take place immediately. On 17 March he wrote again to Rudolf, advising him to meet the papal nuncios, and that, in their negotiations, he should by no means introduce the topic of the Exarchate of Ravenna, the Pentapolis, and the Romandiola. This looked like extortion. The French Innocent's favoritism toward King Charles, the brother of Louis IX and uncle of Philip III, and his harshness toward Rudolf was beginning to change the balance of power in Italy once more and was pointing in the direction of war. Pope Gregory's efforts to bring about peace had been ruined.

On the 26th he ordered the Bishops of Parma and Comacchio to see to it that Boniface de Lavania (Lavagna) be installed as Archbishop of Ravenna, as Pope Gregory X had decided. Innocent was able to arrange a peace treaty between Genoa and Naples, which was signed on 18 June 1276.

On 18 May 1276, Pope Innocent V notified King Philip III of France that he had appointed his friend Fr. Guy de Sully, OP, the Dominican Provincial of Paris (a post that Innocent himself had held until 1272, when he was appointed Archbishop of Lyon), to the see of Bourges.

A noteworthy feature of his brief pontificate was the practical form assumed by his desire for reunion with the Eastern Church. He wrote to Michael VIII Palaeologus, the Byzantine emperor, informing him of the death of Gregory X, and apologizing for the fact that the Emperor's representatives, George, the Archdeacon of Constantinople, and Theodore, the Dispensator of the Imperial Curia, had not yet been released to return to Constantinople. He was proceeding to send legates to the Emperor in connection with the recent decisions of the Second Council of Lyons, hoping to broker a peace between Constantinople and King Charles I of Naples. King Charles, however, was interested in conquest, not in concord. Innocent was interested in sending people to negotiate the reunion. He appointed Fr. Bartolommeo, O.Min., of Bologna, a Doctor of Sacred Scripture, to travel to the East, but he ordered him to come to Rome first, so that a suitable suite could be chosen for him.

Pope Innocent V died at Rome on 22 June 1276, after a reign of five months and one (or two) days. He was buried in the Lateran Basilica, in a magnificent tomb built by King Charles. Unfortunately, the tomb was destroyed by the two fourteenth century fires at the Basilica, in 1307 and 1361.

Innocent V had created no new cardinals at all, and therefore the participants at the Conclave of July 1276, were the same as in January. King Charles, however, was in Rome the entire time, and was in the position as Senator of Rome, to be the Governor of the Conclave. His wishes could not be ignored.

=== Writings ===
Pope Innocent V was the author of several works of philosophy, theology, and canon law, including commentaries on the Pauline epistles, and on the Sentences of Peter Lombard. He is sometimes referred to as famosissimus doctor.

== Beatification ==
Pope Leo XIII beatified Innocent V on 14 March 1898, on account of his reputation for holiness. The cause for his canonization was formally opened on 25 May 1943.

== See also ==
- List of popes

Catholic Church titles
Preceded by Henry of Segusio	Cardinal-Bishop of Ostia; 1273–1276	Succeeded by Latino Malabranca Orsini
Preceded by Gregory X	Pope; 1276	Succeeded by Adrian V
