= Anchero Pantaléone =

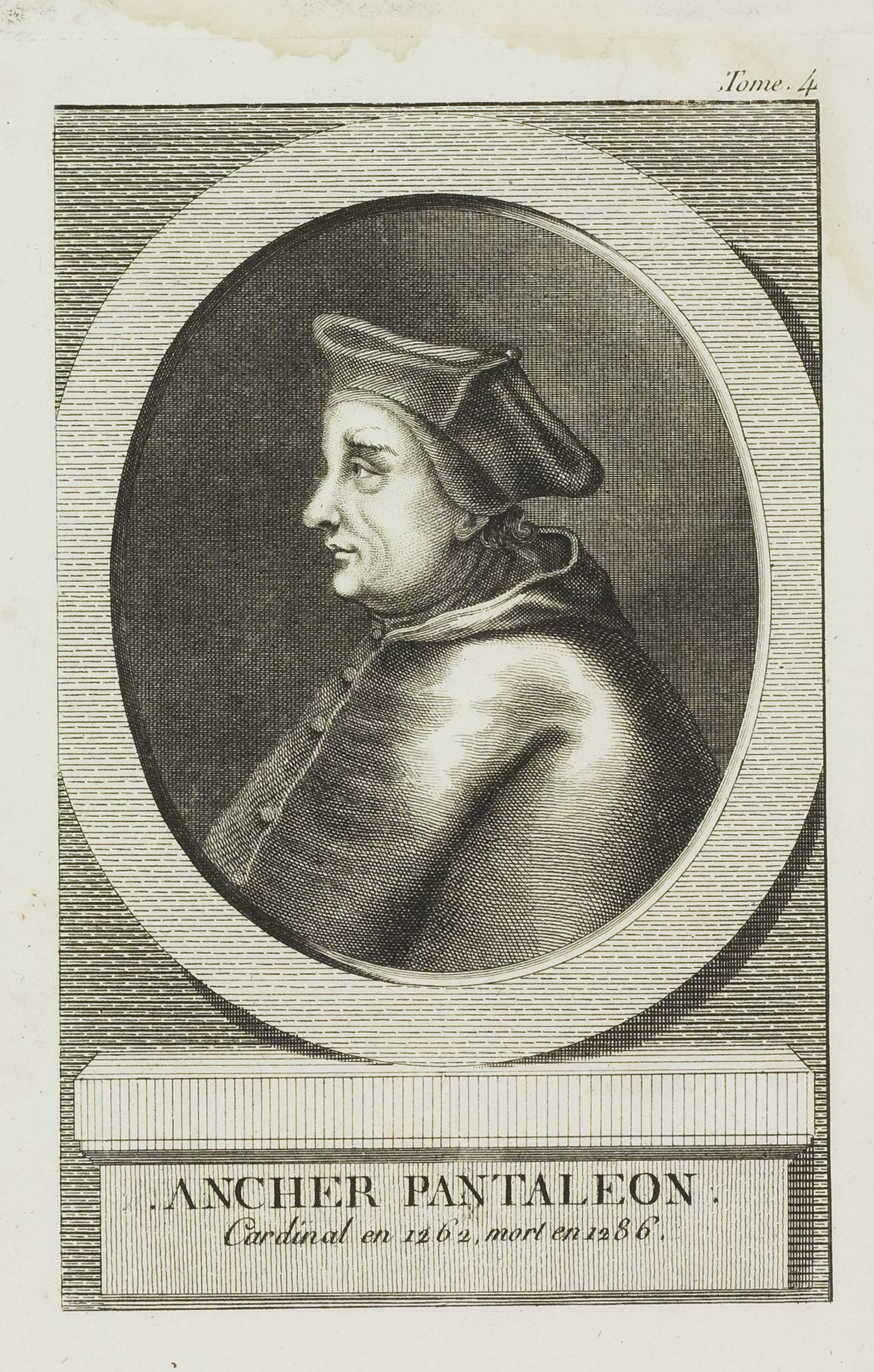
Ancher Pantaleon

Anchero Pantaleone (1210–1286) was a French cardinal and cardinal-nephew of Pope Urban IV, his uncle who elevated him on 22 May 1262. After the death of Urban IV in 1264, Cardinal Ancher supervised the construction of the Basilica of St. Urbain, Troyes, that his uncle had started. Ancher was cardinal protopriest from 1277. He died on 1 November 1286. He is buried in Rome.
