= Pope Gregory X =

Head of the Catholic Church from 1271 to 1276

Pope Blessed Gregory X
- Bishop of Rome
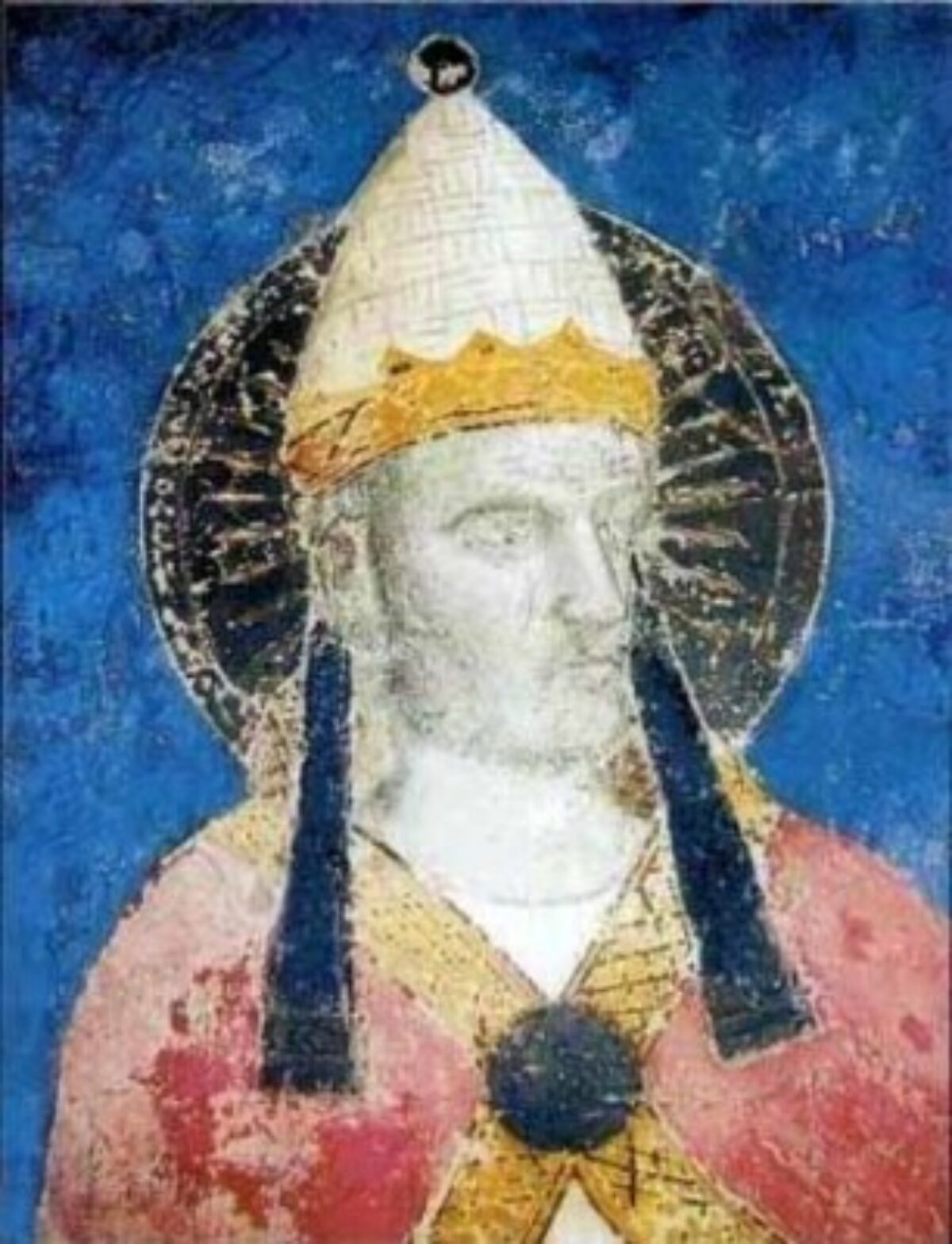
- Fresco of Gregory X by Buonamico Buffalmacco (c. 1330)
- Church: Catholic Church
- Papacy began: 1 September 1271
- Papacy ended: 10 January 1276
- Predecessor: Clement IV
- Successor: Innocent V
- Previous post: Archdeacon of Liège (1246–1271)

Orders
- Ordination: 19 March 1272
- Consecration: 27 March 1272 by John of Toledo

Personal details
- Born: Teobaldo Visconti c. 1210 Piacenza, Holy Roman Empire
- Died: 10 January 1276 (aged 65–66) Arezzo, Holy Roman Empire
- Coat of arms: Gregory X's coat of arms

Sainthood
- Feast day: 10 January
- Venerated in: Catholic Church
- Title as Saint: Blessed
- Beatified: 8 July 1713; Rome, Papal States by Pope Clement XI
- Attributes: Papal vestments; Papal tiara; Crozier
- Patronage: Diocese of Arezzo; Franciscan Tertiaries

Ordination history of Pope Gregory X
History
Priestly ordination
- Date: 19 March 1272
Episcopal consecration
- Date: 27 March 1272
Episcopal succession
Bishops consecrated by Pope Gregory X as principal consecrator
- Pietro Angelleli, O.P.: ?? ???? 1272
- Bishop Matthew of Ross: 29 December 1272
- Guy des Prés: 5 January 1273
- Saint Bonaventure, O.F.M.: 11 November 1273
- Giselbert von Brunkhorst: ?? ???? 1274
- Rudolf von Habsburg-Laufenburg: ?? ???? 1274
- Pierre d'Anisy: 16 September 1274
- Juan de Luna: 5 November 1274
- Amedée de Roussillon: ?? ???? 1275
- Siegfried de Westeburg: 7 April 1275
- Henri d'Isny, O.F.M.: 9 October 1275

Pope Gregory X (Latin: Gregorius X; born Teobaldo Visconti; c. 1210 – 10 January 1276) was head of the Catholic Church and ruler of the Papal States from 1 September 1271 to his death and was a member of the Third Order of St. Francis. He was elected at the conclusion of a papal election that ran from 1268 to 1271, the longest papal election in the history of the Catholic Church.

He convened the Second Council of Lyon and also made new regulations in regards to the papal conclave. Gregory was beatified by Pope Clement XI in 1713 after the confirmation of his cultus.

Gregory's regulations on the conduct of the conclave, though briefly annulled by Adrian V and John XXI, remained standard practice until the 20th century. Gregory's rules were dispensed in certain extraordinary circumstances, offering greater latitude in regulating an upcoming conclave, such as by Pope Pius VI in 1798, in consideration of the occupation of Rome by the French, and by Pope Pius IX in 1878, fearing a potential Vatican invasion could prevent or dominate a papal election.

== Early life ==
Teobaldo Visconti, a member of the Visconti family, was born in Piacenza around 1210.

It is said that he began his career by attaching himself to the household of the Cistercian Cardinal Giacomo di Pecorari, Bishop of Palestrina (1231–1244), who was also from Piacenza. He was attracted by the reputation of holiness which the Cardinal enjoyed; he had been elected abbot of the monastery of Trois-Fontaines in Champagne. Teobaldo became the Cardinal's Oeconomus or Majordomo, and was therefore in constant attendance. The Cardinal was Legate of Pope Gregory IX in Tuscany in 1235, in Lombardy in 1236–1237, and in Provence, France and Germany in 1239–1241. It was probably during the assignment in Provence that Teobaldo became known to important French clergy and laity. He was already Canon of the Basilica of S. Antonino in Piacenza when he returned to Piacenza on business of the Cardinal in 1239.

He then returned to the Cardinal, whose new assignment in France was actually to preach a crusade against Frederick II, the Hohenstaufen Emperor, who was again at war with Pope Gregory IX. Early in 1239, the Pope had again excommunicated the Emperor. Each had demanded an Ecumenical Council to settle their differences. The Pope was willing, but he planned that the council would meet under his auspices and in his territory. He would also bring to Rome all of the enemies of Frederick Hohenstaufen. It was at this point in 1240 that Teobaldo also became a Canon of the Cathedral of Lyons, at the request of the Canons made to Cardinal Giacomo de Pecorari when a vacancy in their number occurred. Pope Gregory's ecumenical council never took place, and he died on 22 August 1241.

The search for a successor to Gregory IX took more than two months. The new Pope, Celestine IV, who was old and ill, survived his election by only 17 days, dying on 10 November 1241. The second electoral assembly of 1241 did not take place for some time, however. The cardinals who were in Rome at the pope's death, having endured considerable mistreatment during the Vacancy of 22 August 1241 to 25 October 1241, which they did not want to endure again, scattered immediately. Only a half-dozen of the 12 cardinals remained in the city. It was not until June 1243 that all the Cardinals, assembled at Anagni and not in Rome, elected Cardinal Sinibaldo Fieschi of Genoa as Pope Innocent IV. In 1243, when the Bishop of Piacenza died, Innocent IV offered the position to Archdeacon Teobaldo, who declined, preferring to follow in the company of Cardinal Giacomo. Cardinal Giacomo, however, died in Rome on 25 June 1244.

== France ==
Upon the death of his patron and spiritual model, Teobaldo decided not to remain any longer in the Curia, planning to travel to Paris, where he would study theology. When he reached Lyons, however, he was received by the Archbishop-elect, Philippe, who asked him to be the dominus and magister of the household. Teobaldo initially refused, but the Archbishop insisted and finally Teobaldo accepted the position.

In July 1244, Pope Innocent IV was forced by Frederick II Augustus to flee from Rome. He first travelled to his native Genoa, and then headed to Lyons, where the idea of an ecumenical council took shape. Teobaldo helped to organize the Ecumenical Council which met at Lyons in June and July 1245. During this period, Visconti became acquainted with people such as Bonaventure, Thomas Aquinas, Gui Foucois, Pierre de Tarentaise and Matteo Rubeo Orsini, all of whom were participants in the council. Visconti was appointed Archdeacon of Heinault in the diocese of Liège on 9 September 1246, perhaps as a reward for his services. He was instructed by Pope Innocent IV (Sinibaldo Fieschi, 1243–1254) to preach the crusade for the recovery of the Holy Land. Such preaching had a significant financial character, since both the Crusaders and the papacy were desperate to raise funds. Teobaldo was not able to do much more than preach, sacerdotally, since he still was not a priest.

Teobaldo's time in Liège was evidently not a happy one. The bishop whom he had come to know at the Council of Lyons, Robert de Thorete, died after a brief illness on 16 October 1246. There had been a struggle for the episcopal seat when he was appointed. The Provost of Utrecht, the candidate of Frederick II, had attempted to usurp the seat, and Cardinal Giacomo de Pecorari, Bishop of Palestrina had been ordered by the Pope to intervene and prohibit an election until the canons of the cathedral could meet with him. But the vacancy of the papal throne occurred after the death of Pope Gregory IX, and lasted until June 1243. In that interval the squabbling electors came to an understanding, and on 30 October 1240, Robert, the brother of the Bishop of Verdun, was chosen. Another struggle between two candidates ensued on his death, and Cardinal Robert Capocci was sent to settle the election. Since Teobaldo was a canon as well as Archdeacon, he was directly involved. The successful candidate, on 10 October 1247, Henry III of Guelders, was a worldly man, the brother of Otto II, Count of Guelders, and was not yet in Holy Orders. In fact, for the next twelve years, he was neither ordained priest nor consecrated bishop. The new Bishop-Elect and his Archdeacon immediately had problems about Teobaldo's conduct of his office while being absent in Paris, an issue which was not settled until the end of 1250.

Finally, in 1258, Henry of Guelders was consecrated. He also had himself elected Abbot of the famous Monastery of Stabulo (Stavelo). This did not mean that he gave up his former dissolute military life. In 1262, he clashed with Archdeacon Teobaldo. During a Chapter meeting, he was roundly criticized by Teobaldo, who accused him of compromising the virtue of Berta, daughter of Conrardi de Coen le Frison, by force. The Bishop threatened to strike the Archdeacon. Consequently, few days later, Teobaldo was moved to leave Liège, and it is said that he undertook a pilgrimage to the Holy Land. He actually got as far as Paris, where he resumed his long-standing plan of studying theology. During this time he became a friend of King Louis IX.

Visconti left Liège in 1267 for Paris at the behest of Pope Clement IV who sent him to England to assist Cardinal Ottobono Fieschi, who had been appointed Papal Legate in England in 1265, to support King Henry III in the rebellion of the barons, led by Simon de Montfort. It was during this assignment that Teobaldo became friends with Prince Edward of England (the future Edward I), with whom he went on Crusade. Cardinal Fieschi returned to Viterbo, and participated in the conclave of 1268–1271. Edward took the cross on 24 June 1268, followed Louis IX to Tunisia, and finally reached Acre on 9 May 1271.

== Papal election ==
Visconti was elected to succeed Pope Clement IV on 1 September 1271 after the papal chair had been vacant for two years and nine months, due to divisions among the cardinals. The College of Cardinals, meeting in Viterbo where Pope Clement IV (1265–1268) had died, was equally divided between the French and Italian cardinals. The French wanted a pope from their own country, influenced by Charles of Anjou, the younger brother of King Louis IX of France, who had been invested with the throne of Sicily by Pope Clement IV (1265–1268). Charles had also successfully intrigued to have himself elected Senator of Rome, and he repeatedly intervened in the political affairs of the entire Italian peninsula. He had entered Rome on 23 May 1265 where he was made Senator and was proclaimed king of Sicily. On 6 January 1266, he was crowned in St. Peter's Basilica by Cardinals Riccardo Annibaldi, Raoul de Grosparmy, Ancher Pantaleoni, Matteo Orsini, and Goffredo da Alatri, with permission of Pope Clement IV, who did not dare to approach Rome himself due to the hostility of the Ghibelline government toward him.

The deadlock was not even broken when the citizens of Viterbo locked up the cardinals in the Episcopal palace where they were meeting, and finally tearing off part of the roof of the building. Finally, in August 1271, the Cardinals decided to appoint a committee, three of their number from each side, to negotiate a settlement (Election by Compromise). When the six could not agree, however, on the choice of one of the cardinals, they decided to look outside their ranks. They settled on Teobaldo Visconti, the Archdeacon of Liège. Their decision was ratified by all of the Cardinals on 1 September 1271. This was a victory, in fact, for the French-leaning faction, since Teobaldo had intimate connections with France, and his nephew, Vicedomino de Vicedomini, a native of Piacenza but Archbishop of Aix in Provence, had been a follower and advisor of Charles of Anjou ever since he came into Italy.

The election of Visconti, after a two-year, nine-month struggle, came as a complete surprise to him, since it took place while he was engaged in the Ninth Crusade at Acre in Palestine with King Edward I of England. Not wanting to abandon his mission, his first action, upon hearing of his election, was to send out appeals for aid to the Crusaders. At his final sermon at Acre just before setting sail for Italy, he famously remarked, quoting Psalm 137: "If I forget thee, O Jerusalem, let my right hand forget her cunning."

Nonetheless, Visconti had to return to Italy immediately, since he had been summoned by the Cardinals in order to accept the election at their hands. On 1 January 1272, the Pope-Elect reached Brindisi. After another month of travel, he arrived in Viterbo, the site of the Election, where the Cardinals were waiting, in early February 1272. On some unknown date over the next few weeks after his arrival, he completed the Election by accepting the Papacy; it was in Viterbo that he assumed the papal mantle. But he was still careful to call himself Episcopus-electus. On 13 March 1272, he entered Rome with the entire Roman Curia. Since he was not in Holy Orders, he had to be ordained a priest, which took place on 19 March 1272. He was consecrated a bishop and finally crowned on 27 March 1272 at St. Peter's Basilica.

== Papal protection of Jews and condemnation of the "blood libel" ==
On the seventh of October 1272 Gregory X in Orvieto gave the papal bull "Vineam Sorec" on treatment of the Jews to John Lectator, the vice-chancellor of the Holy Roman Empire in which he sought to offer his protection for Jews, clarify church teaching on treatment of Jews and condemn violence against Jews, forced baptism and the blood libel. (a false claim that Jews killed children for ritual purposes) In the bull Gregory reaffirms teachings of Pope St Gregory the great, saying "Even as it is not allowed to the Jews in their assemblies presumptuously to undertake for themselves more than that which is permitted them by law, even so they ought not to suffer any disadvantage in those [privileges] which have been granted them." (This sentence was first written by Gregory the great).He then also condemns forced baptisms saying: "We decree moreover that no Christian shall compel them or any one of their group to come to baptism unwillingly." and "For, indeed, that person who is known to have come to Christian baptism not freely, but unwillingly, is not believed to possess the Christian faith."

Gregory then condemns Christians who "seize, imprison, wound, torture, mutilate, kill or inflict violence on them [Jews]".Gregory also says that no one should disturb the Jews during their festivals with "clubs or stones or anything else."

Gregory in the bull then says that Christian testimony against Jews is not valid unless among the Christians there is also a Jew to give testimony. (A similar law which was also designed to protect Jews was written by Louis the Pious of the Frankish empire (814-840)

Next Gregory explains that sometimes Christians lose their children and lies are made up against Jews accusing them of carrying away the children and performing a ritual murder on them, Gregory condemns this idea saying "And most falsely do these Christians claim that the Jews have secretly and furtively carried away these children and killed them, and that the Jews offer sacrifices from the heart and the blood of these children, since their law in this matter precisely and expressly forbids Jews to sacrifice, eat, or drink the blood, or to eat the flesh of animals having claws. This has been demonstrated many times at our court by Jews converted to the Christian faith: nevertheless very many Jews are often seized and detained unjustly because of this." Gregory orders that Jews arrested under "such a silly pretext" be freed from imprisonment and they "shall not be arrested henceforth on such a miserable pretext, "He then says that Christians should not stir up anything new against them.

Gregory spends the rest of the bull condemning desecration of Jewish cemeteries and excommunicates anyone who digs up Jewish graves to use the bodies as ransom.

While Gregory had condemned charges of "blood libel" and commanded them to stop, such accusations continued to be made into the 20th century and the letter failed to stop them.

== Diplomatic communications with Mongols ==
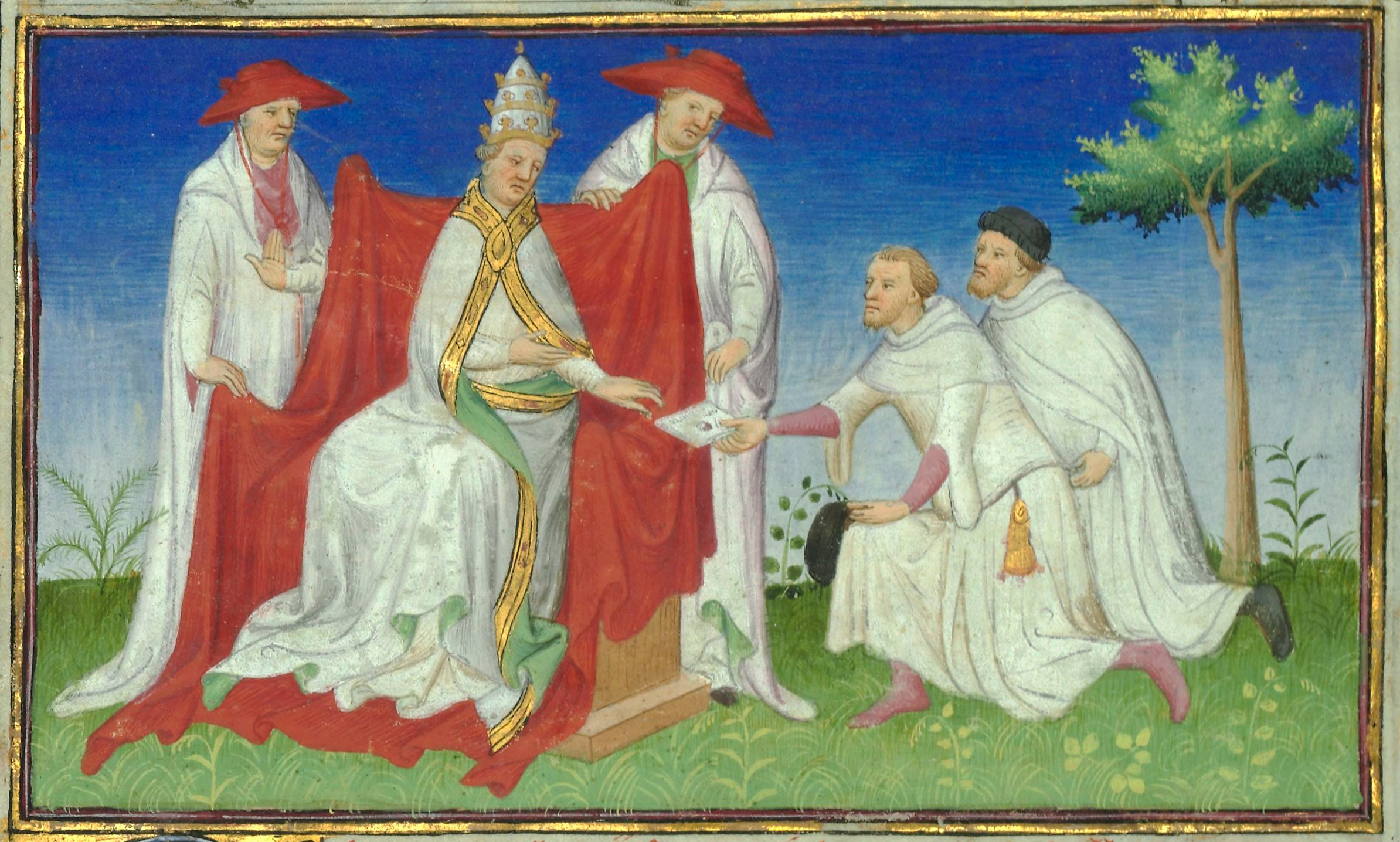
Niccolò and Maffeo Polo remitting a letter from Kublai Khan to Pope Gregory X in 1271.

As soon as he was elected in 1271, Pope Gregory X received a letter from the Mongol Great Khan Kublai, remitted by Niccolò and Maffeo Polo following their travels to his court in Mongolia. Kublai was asking for the dispatch of a hundred missionaries, and some oil from the lamp of the Holy Sepulcher. The new Pope could spare only two friars and some lamp oil. The friars turned back soon after the party left for Mongolia. The two Polos (this time accompanied by the young Marco Polo, who was then 17 years old) returned to the Mongol Empire and remitted the oil from the Pope to Kublai in 1275.

The Mongol Ilkhanate leader Abaqa sent a delegation with over a dozen members to the 1274 Council of Lyon, where plans were made for possible military cooperation between the Mongols and the Europeans. After the council, Abaqa sent another embassy led by the Georgian Vassali brothers to further notify Western leaders of military preparations. Gregory X answered that his legates would accompany the Crusade, and that they would be in charge of coordinating military operations with the Il-Khan. However, these projects for a major new Crusade essentially came to a halt with the death of Gregory X on 10 January 1276. The money which had been saved to finance the expedition was instead distributed in Italy.

== Pope and Council ==
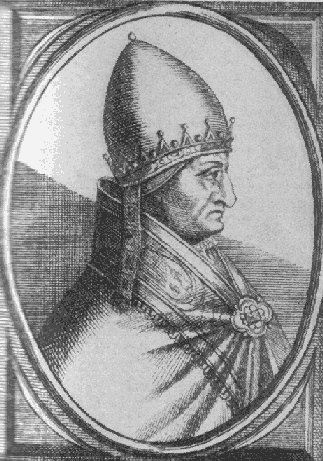
engraving of Pope Gregory X

Mindful of the scandals attached to the conclave at Viterbo that had elected him, realizing that tighter controls on the entire process of election were needed, he produced the papal bull Ubi periculum which was subsequently ratified by the Council of Lyons on 16 July 1274 and incorporated into the Code of Canon Law.

On his arrival at Rome in 1272, his first act was to carry forward the wish of Gregory IX and summon a council. Two days after his coronation Gregory X sent a letter to King Edward I of England, inviting him to a general council to be held on the subject of the Holy Land, beginning on 1 May 1274. Pope Gregory X left Orvieto on 5 June 1273, and arrived in Lyons in the middle of November 1273. Not all of the cardinals followed him. Pope Gregory notes in a letter to King Edward dated 29 November 1273 that Cardinal Riccardo Annibaldi and Cardinal Giovanni Orsini were still in Rome and had been ordered to find a secure place of imprisonment for Guy de Montfort. The two cardinals were hereditary enemies and would be an effective check on each other. Neither was present at the opening of the Council of Lyons. Gregory himself had an immediate meeting with King Philip III of France, whom he had been cultivating vigorously since his accession. The meeting was evidently quite harmonious and successful, since Philip ceded to the Papacy the Comtat Venaissin. The Second Ecumenical Council met at Lyons, beginning on 1 May 1274 for the purpose of considering the East-West Schism, the condition of the Holy Land, and the abuses of the Catholic Church.

== Council objectives ==
His main objective as pope was to convene the council, and he had a programme for that council:

- Reconciliation with the Orthodox Church to end the schism between the East and West.
- Preparation of a new crusade and donations of a tithe of all churches for it.
- Establishment of measures to end abuses in the church.
- Regulation of papal elections through the constitution "Ubi periculum maius".

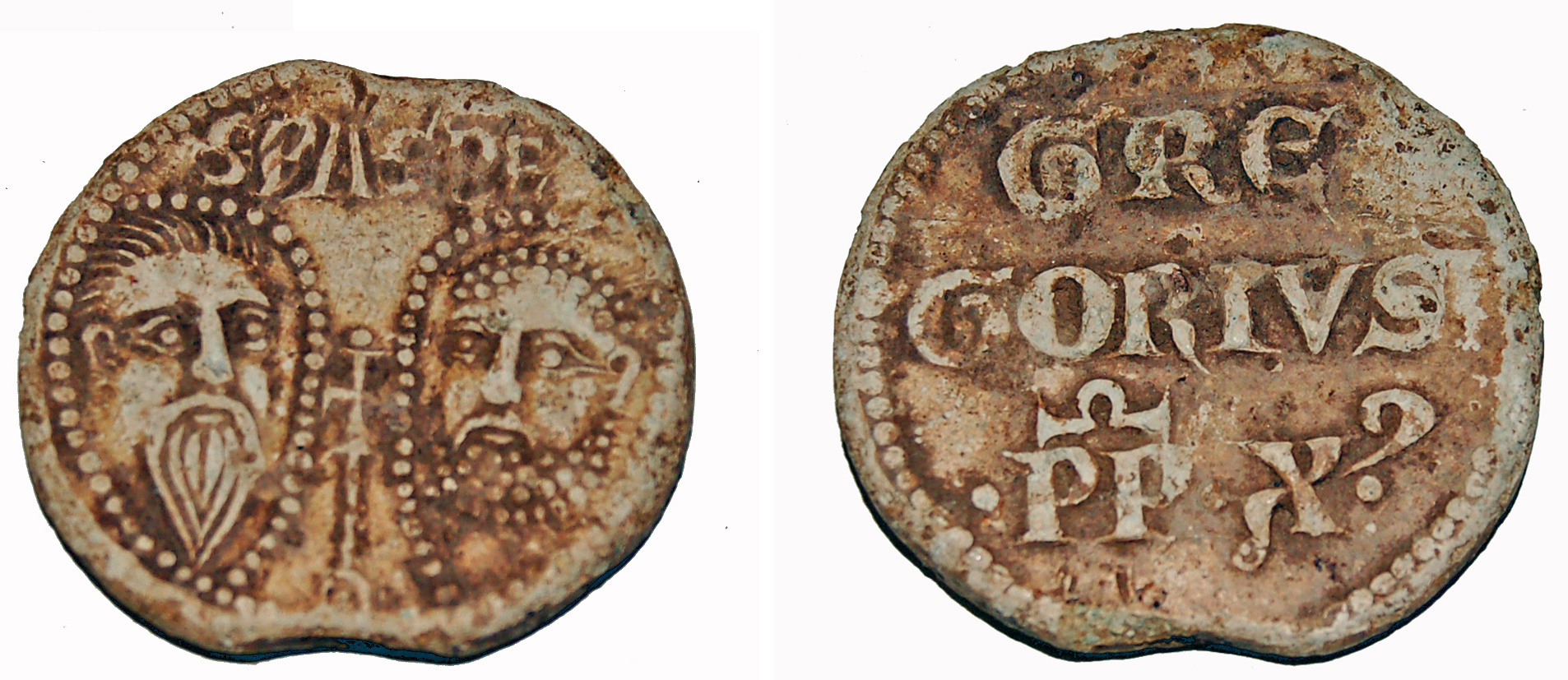
Papal bulla of Gregory X

The Pope's interests were not doctrinal in nature, but disciplinary.

In connection with the financing of the Crusade, Pope Gregory imposed on all clerics a six-year long tax of 10% of their income. This was a considerable increase in the tax rate, which, on previous occasions had been for three years, at a rate of 5%. 26 permanent tax districts were established, each having a Collector and a Sub-Collector.

His Constitution with respect to conclaves legislated a number of important points:

- that a meeting for the election of a pope should be held at a suitable place, where the Pope and his Curia were residing when the Pope died; if they were at a villa, or a country village, or a town, they should proceed to the nearest city in the diocese (unless it was under an interdict).
- that a meeting for the election of a pope should not take place until the space of at least ten days had intervened;
- that all cardinals who were absent from the Conclave should have no right to cast a vote;
- that not only absent cardinals, but also men of every order and condition, are eligible to be created the Roman pontiff;
- that, at the conclusion of the Novendiales, and the Mass of the Holy Spirit sung on the tenth day, all the cardinals who are present should be enclosed in the palace where the Pope died; along with two or, if they are ill, three or four servants; none may enter or leave, except on account of illness. There should be no interior walls, but each cardinal's quarters should be separated from the rest by cloth drapes, and they should live in common.
- that the place of the conclave and its entries should be carefully guarded;
- that the Cardinals may not leave the Conclave for any reason, until a new pope has been elected;
- that Cardinals who arrive after the enclosing of the Conclave, and before the election of a new pope, have the power to enter the Conclave and vote along with the others, and no Cardinal can be excluded for any reason, not even if he be excommunicated;
- that, if a pope has not been elected in three days, then cardinals are permitted to have only one dish at their meals;
- that, in holding the deliberations, no one is to be put under an anathema, no one is to engage in bribery, or to make any promises, or by going around politicking to promise a cardinal anything once he has been created pope. During the Conclave, the cardinals are to engage in no other business than completing the election;
- that no one can be elected pope without the votes of two-thirds of the Cardinals present in the Conclave;
- that, upon the death of a pope, all magistracies and offices cease and vacate their functions, except for the Major Penitentiary and the Minor Penitentiaries, and the Chamberlain of the Holy Roman Church (Camerlengo).

== Death and burial ==
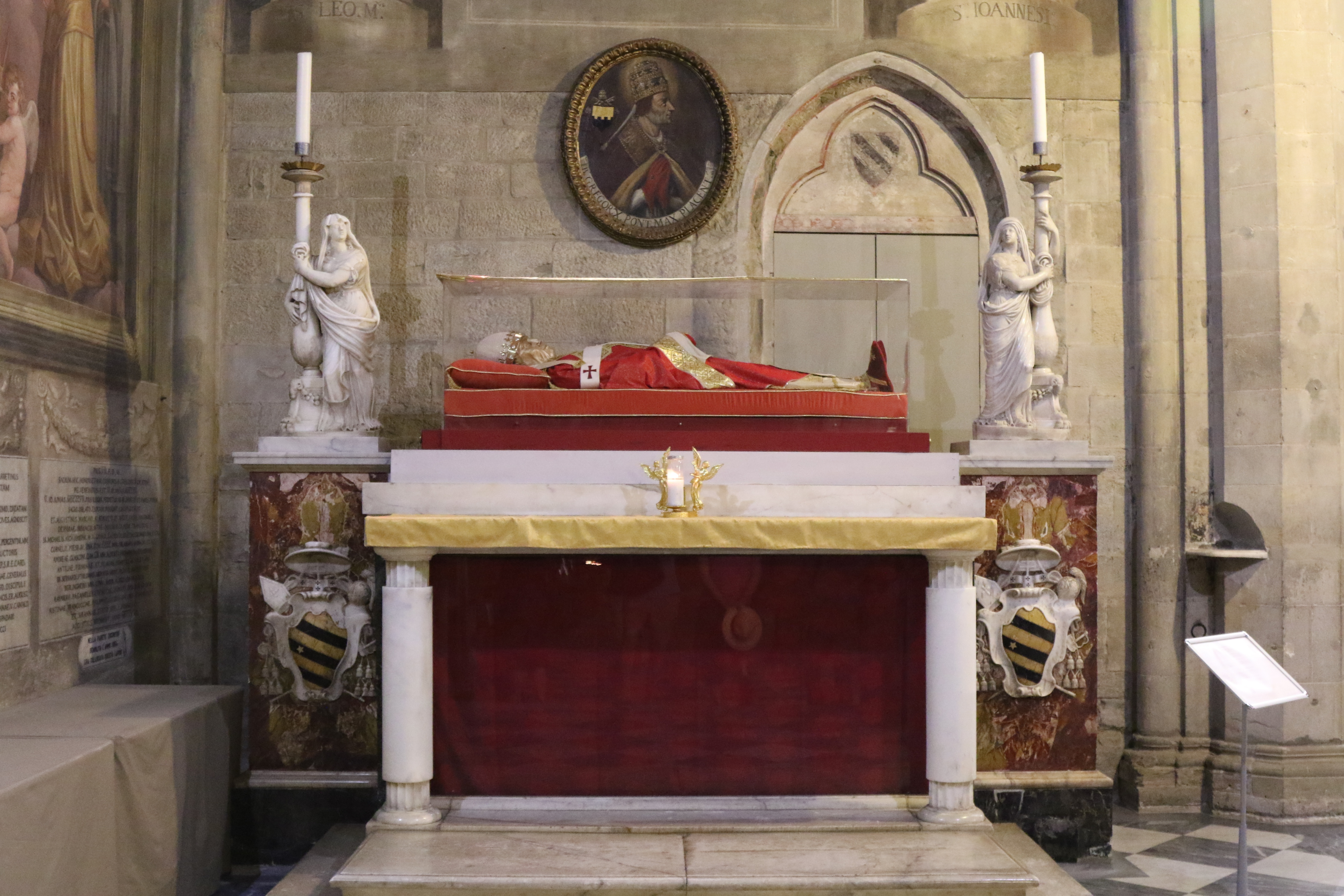
The effigy of Pope Gregory X in Arezzo

Gregory's health had worsened after he left Lyons in April 1275. He was suffering from a hernia, and so he was forced to stop frequently on the way back to Rome. He departed Vienne shortly after 30 September 1275 and arrived in Lausanne on 6 October 1275. In Lausanne, he met with the Emperor-elect Rudolf of Habsburg, King of the Romans, and on 20 October 1275, received his oath of fealty. On Tuesday, 12 November 1275, he was in Milan. His party reached Reggio Emilia on 5 December 1275, and they were in Bologna on 11 December 1275. A severe rise in his temperature and the presence of the hernia forced him to a halt at Arezzo in time for Christmas of 1275. His condition rapidly declined following this and led to his death on 10 January 1276. He is buried inside the Cathedral Church of Arezzo.

He was succeeded by the Dominican Peter of Tarantaise of Savoy (Pope Innocent V), a close collaborator of the pontiff throughout his pontificate.

== Beatifications and canonizations ==
Throughout his pontificate, Gregory X only canonized one individual. He confirmed the cultus of Franca Visalta in September 1273. She was a Cistercian nun from Piacenza, authoritarian and given to extreme forms of self-mortification. Having been eased out of a Benedictine convent, where she had been placed at the age of seven, she built her own convent, over which she ruled as Abbess.

He commenced the cause of canonization of King Louis IX of France in 1272, an act which bestowed on the king who had died in August 1270 the title of Servant of God.

He beatified Luchesius Modestini in 1274 with the confirmation of his cultus.

== Vestments ==
Writing in L'Osservatore Romano, Agostino Paravicini Bagliani says that the popular belief that Pius V (1566–72) was the first Pope to wear the white cassock is inaccurate. Instead, writes Bagliani, the first document that mentions the Pope's white cassock dates from 1274. "The first pope to be solemnly invested with the red mantle immediately after his election was Gregory VII (1076)", the scholar added, noting that traditionally "from the moment of his election the Pope put on vestments of two colors: red (cope, mozzetta, shoes); and white (cassock, socks)."

== Beatification ==
Pope Clement XI beatified Gregory X in 1713. He was made a patron of the Diocese of Arezzo and of Franciscan Tertiaries. His cause of canonization resumed in 1944 under Pope Pius XII and remains open, with the requirement of a miracle attributed to his intercession needed for his canonization.

== Pope Gregory X in popular culture ==
Teobaldo Visconti is a central character in the 1982 American-Italian miniseries Marco Polo, in which he is portrayed by American actor Burt Lancaster. He is also depicted by Irish actor Gabriel Byrne in the 2014–2016 Netflix series Marco Polo.

== See also ==
- Papal election, 1268–71
- Cardinals created by Gregory X

== Notes ==
Catholic Church titles
Preceded by Clement IV	Pope; 1271–76	Succeeded by Innocent V
