= 1287–1288 papal election =

Election of Catholic Pope Nicholas IV

Papal election 1287–88

Dates and location
- 4 April 1287 – 22 February 1288; Corte Savella, Aventine Hill

Key officials
- Dean: Bentivenga dei Bentivenghi
- Protopriest: Jean Cholet
- Protodeacon: Goffredo da Alatri; Matteo Orsini Rosso

Elected pope
- Girolamo Masci; Name taken: Nicholas IV
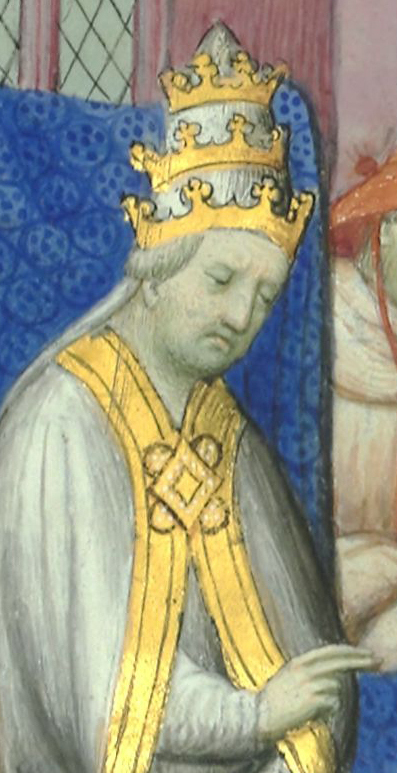

The 1287–88 papal election (April 4 – February 22) was the deadliest papal election in the history of the Roman Catholic Church, with six (or five) of the sixteen (or fifteen) cardinal electors perishing during the deliberations. Eventually, the cardinals elected Girolamo Masci, O.Min. as Pope Nicholas IV, almost a year after the death of Pope Honorius IV, who died on April 3, 1287. Nicholas IV was the first Franciscan pope.

The cardinals' deaths are usually attributed to malaria. After the deaths of the six cardinals, the remaining electors—with the exception of Masci—left Rome and reassembled on 15 February 1288. When the Cardinals reassembled in February 1288, there were seven electors left: Latino Malabranca, Bentivenga de Bentivengis, Girolamo Masci, Bernard de Languissel, Matteo Rosso Orsini, Giacomo Colonna, and Benedetto Caetani. Upon finding that Masci had remained at Santa Sabina in Rome the reassembled cardinals immediately elected him, but he refused until he was re-elected on 22 February. It was thought at the time that Masci had survived by keeping a fire burning in his room to "purify" the pestilential vapors, or mal aria thought to cause the disease.

The election was held near Santa Sabina on Aventine Hill in the Savelli palace, Corte Savella, which Honorius IV had built and used as the de facto papal residence. According to Smith, Nicholas IV was, like his predecessor, "an undisguised partisan of the French interest" and "another example of the dishonest use of spiritual authority for political ends, by releasing Charles II of Naples from an inconvenient oath to Alfonso III of Aragon".

== Cardinal electors ==
Elector	Nationality	Order	Title	Elevated	Elevator	Notes
Bentivenga da Bentivengi, O.F.M.	Acquasparta	Cardinal-bishop	Bishop of Albano	March 12, 1278	Nicholas III	Dean of the Sacred College of Cardinals; Major Penitentiarius
Latino Malabranca Orsini, O.P.	Roman	Cardinal-bishop	Bishop of Ostia e Velletri	March 12, 1278	Nicholas III	Inquisitor General of the Papal Inquisition; nephew of Pope Honorius IV
Bernard de Languissel	French	Cardinal-bishop	Bishop of Porto e Santa Rufina	April 12, 1281	Martin IV	
Giovanni Boccamazza	Roman	Cardinal-bishop	Bishop of Frascati	December 22, 1285	Honorius IV	Cardinal-nephew
Gerardo Bianchi	Parma	Cardinal-bishop	Bishop of Sabina	March 12, 1278	Nicholas III	Some sources indicate that he was absent
Girolamo Masci, O.F.M.	Ascoli	Cardinal-bishop	Bishop of Palestrina	March 12, 1278	Nicholas III	Elected Pope Nicholas IV
Jean Cholet	French	Cardinal-priest	Title of S. Cecilia	April 12, 1281	Martin IV	Protopriest
Matteo Rosso Orsini	Roman	Cardinal-deacon	Deacon of S. Maria in Portico	May 22, 1262	Urban IV	Protodeacon after the death of Goffredo da Alatri; archpriest of the Vatican Basilica since 1278; cardinal-protector of the Order of Franciscans
Giacomo Colonna	Roman	Cardinal-deacon	Deacon of S. Maria in Via Lata	March 12, 1278	Nicholas III	Archpriest of the Liberian Basilica
Benedetto Caetani, seniore	Anagni	Cardinal-deacon	Deacon of S. Nicola in Carcere Tulliano	April 12, 1281	Martin IV	Future Pope Boniface VIII
Goffredo da Alatri†	Alatri	Cardinal-deacon	Deacon of S. Giorgio in Velabro	December 17, 1261	Urban IV	Protodeacon; Died in 1287, possibly during the sede vacante after April 3, 1287
Giordano Orsini†	Roman	Cardinal-deacon	Deacon of S. Eustachio	March 12, 1278	Nicholas III	Died during the sede vacante on September 8, 1287
Hugh of Evesham†	English	Cardinal-priest	Title of S. Lorenzo in Lucina	April 12, 1281	Martin IV	Died during the sede vacante on September 4, 1287
Gervais Jeancolet de Clinchamp†	French	Cardinal-priest	Title of Ss. Silvestro e Martino ai Monti	April 12, 1281	Martin IV	Died during the sede vacante on September 15, 1287
Glusiano de Casate†	Milanese	Cardinal-priest	Title of Ss. Marcellino e Pietro	April 12, 1281	Martin IV	Died during the sede vacante on April 8, 1287
Geoffroy de Bar†	French	Cardinal-priest	Title of S. Susanna	April 12, 1281	Martin IV	Died during the sede vacante on August 21, 1287
