= 1285 papal election =

Election of Catholic Pope Honorius IV

Papal election 1285

Dates and location
- 1–2 April 1285; Perugia

Key officials
- Dean: Ordonho Alvares
- Protopriest: Anchero Pantaleone
- Protodeacon: Giacomo Savelli

Election
- Ballots: 1

Elected pope
- Giacomo Savelli; Name taken: Honorius IV

The 1285 papal election, convened in Viterbo after the death of Pope Martin IV, elected Cardinal Giacomo Savelli, who took the name Honorius IV. Because of the suspension of the apostolic constitution Ubi periculum by Adrian V in 1276, this election was technically not a papal conclave. In fact, for the first time since the tedious papal election of 1268–1271, the meetings were dominated neither by the Hohenstaufen nor Charles I of Naples (who had died on January 7, 1285). It may even be that the cardinals proceeded so swiftly to an election with the intention of forestalling any intervention from Naples.

== Participants ==
Pope Martin IV, who was living at Perugia, never having visited the city of Rome, was stricken ill with a slow fever on Easter Sunday, March 25, and died on March 28, 1285. At that time, there were 18 living cardinals in the Sacred College, though three of them were away as Legates and were not notified in time. Fifteen of them participated in the election of his successor:

Elector	Nationality	Cardinalatial title	Elevated	Elevator	Notes
Ordonho Alvares	Portuguese	Bishop of Frascati	1278, March 12	Nicholas III	Dean of the Sacred College of Cardinals
Bentivenga dei Bentivenghi, O.F.M.	Italian	Bishop of Albano	1278, March 12	Nicholas III	Grand penitentiary
Latino Malabranca Orsini, O.P.	Italian	Bishop of Ostia e Velletri	1278, March 12	Nicholas III	Inquisitor General of the Papal Inquisition
Girolamo Masci, O.F.M.	Italian	Bishop of Palestrina	1278, March 12	Nicholas III	
Anchero Pantaleone	French	Priest of S. Prassede	1262, May 22	Urban IV	Protopriest of the Sacred College of Cardinals
Hugh of Evesham	English	Priest of S. Lorenzo in Lucina	1281, April 12	Martin IV	
Gervais Jeancolet de Clinchamp	French	Priest of SS. Silvestro e Martino ai Monti	1281, April 12	Martin IV	
Cosmo Glusano de Casate	Italian	Priest of SS. Marcellino e Pietro	1281, April 12	Martin IV	
Geoffroy de Bar	French	Priest of S. Susanna	1281, April 12	Martin IV	
Giacomo Savelli	Italian	Deacon of S. Maria in Cosmedin	1261, December 17	Urban IV	Protodeacon of the Sacred College of Cardinals. Elected as Pope Honorius IV
Goffredo da Alatri	Italian	Deacon of S. Giorgio in Velabro	1261, December 17	Urban IV	
Matteo Rosso Orsini	Italian	Deacon of S. Maria in Portico Octaviae	1262, May 22	Urban IV	Archpriest of the patriarchal Vatican Basilica; Cardinal-protector of the Order of Franciscans
Giordano Orsini	Italian	Deacon of S. Eustachio	1278, March 12	Nicholas III	
Giacomo Colonna	Italian	Deacon of S. Maria in Via Lata; commendatario of S. Marcello and S. Maria in Aquiro	1278, March 12	Nicholas III	Archpriest of the patriarchal Liberian Basilica
Benedetto Caetani	Italian	Deacon of S. Nicola in Carcere Tulliano	1281, April 12	Martin IV	

== Absentee cardinals ==
Three cardinals were absent:

Elector	Nationality	Cardinalatial Title	Elevated	Elevator	Notes
Gerardo Bianchi	Italian	Bishop of Sabina	1278, March 12	Nicholas III	Papal Legate in the Kingdom of Sicily
Bernard Languissel	French	Bishop of Porto e Santa Rufina	1281, April 12	Martin IV	Papal Legate in Lombardy and Tuscany
Jean Cholet	French	Priest of S. Cecilia	1281, April 12	Martin IV	Papal Legate in France

== The election of Pope Honorius IV ==
Fifteen cardinals assembled in the episcopal residence at Perugia on April 1, three days after the death of Martin IV. This was according to the ancient custom, rather than the Constitution "Ubi Periculum" (1274) of Pope Gregory X. In the first scrutiny on the following day, they unanimously elected Cardinal Giacomo Savelli, prior Diacanorum of the College of Cardinals. Although he was already 75 years old, Savelli accepted his election and took the name of Honorius IV. His election and acceptance were even more surprising since he was suffering from a severe case of arthritis. He could only get around on crutches, and he had to have a special chair designed for him so that he could be seated at the altar during Mass, and have his arm supported so that he could raise the host at the consecration. He left Perugia for Rome at some point after April 25, 1285, where his election had been welcomed because he was a leading aristocrat of the Eternal City. His father had been Senator of Rome in 1266. He took up residence at the family estate on the Aventine Hill, next to the Church of Santa Sabina. On May 19 the new Pope was ordained to the priesthood in the Vatican Basilica. On the following day, he was consecrated bishop by Cardinal-Bishop of Ostia Latino Malabranca Orsini and solemnly crowned by Cardinal Goffredo da Alatri, who became new protodeacon of the Sacred College.

== Bibliography ==
- Bernhard Pawlicki, Papst Honorius IV. Eine Monographie (Münster 1896).
- Ferdinand Gregorovius, History of Rome in the Middle Ages, Volume V.2, second edition, revised (London: George Bell, 1906).
