= Cardinals created by Martin IV =

Catholic appointments in 1281

Pope Martin IV (1281–1285) created seven new Cardinals in one consistory on 12 April 1281:

1. Bernard de Languissel, archbishop of Arles – cardinal-bishop of Porto e S. Rufina, † 19 September 1291.
2. Hugh of Evesham – cardinal-priest of S. Lorenzo in Lucina, † 27 July 1287.
3. Jean Cholet – cardinal-priest of S. Cecilia, † 2 August 1292.
4. Gervais Jeancolet de Clinchamp – cardinal-priest of SS. Silvestro e Martino, † 15 September 1287.
5. Conte de Casate – cardinal-priest of SS. Marcellino e Pietro, † 8 April 1287.
6. Geoffroy de Bar – cardinal-priest of S. Susanna, † 21 August 1287.
7. Benedetto Caetani – cardinal-deacon of S. Nicola in Carcere, then cardinal-priest of SS. Silvestro e Martino (22 September 1291) and Pope Boniface VIII (24 December 1294), † 11 October 1303.
