= Matteo Rosso Orsini (cardinal) =

Roman aristocrat

Matteo Rosso Orsini (c. 1230, in Rome – 4 September 1305, in Perugia), was a Roman aristocrat, politician, diplomat, and Roman Catholic Cardinal. He was the nephew of Pope Nicholas III (Giovanni Gaetano Orsini) (1277-1280).

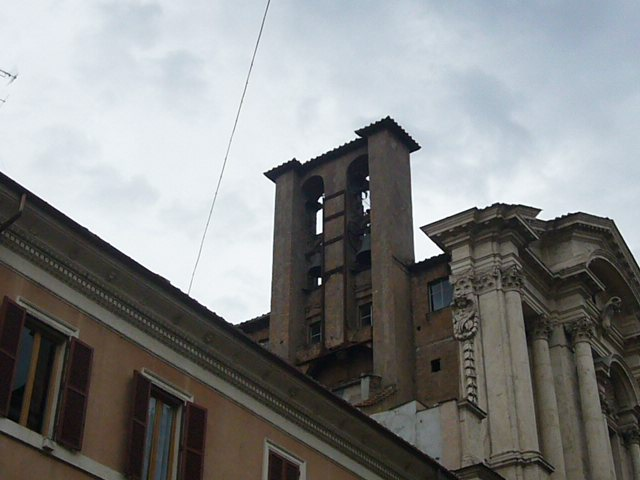
S. Maria in Portico

== Family and early life ==
Matteo Rosso was the son of Gentile Orsini, Lord of Mugnano, Penna, Nettuno and Pitigliano, who was the son of Matteo Rosso Orsini, "Il Grande" (1178-1246). Matteo's mother was named Costanza. He had two older male siblings, Romano (a Dominican) and Bertoldo, and two older female siblings, Perna (who married Pietro Stefaneschi, Lord of Porto, the parents of Cardinal Giacomo Giovanni Gaetani Stefaneschi) and Angela (who married Guastarano de’ Paparoni, Count of Anguillara). He had a younger brother, Orso, and a sister, Elisabetta (who married Roffredo Caetani, Lord of Sermoneta). His uncle was Cardinal Giovanni Gaetano Orsini, who had been made a cardinal in 1244 and who became Pope Nicholas III in 1277.

The family was very close to S. Francis of Assisi. The Grandfather, Matteo Rosso "Il Grande", had been a member of the Third Order of S. Francis, and Giovanni Gaetano Orsini had been an oblate as a child, and had been named Protector of the Franciscans by Pope Alexander IV.

There is little evidence about Matteo Rosso Orsini's education.

On 4 January 1253, Pope Innocent IV (Fieschi) wrote concerning the testamentary bequests of Cardinal Giovanni Colonna (died 1245), which were being administered by his executor, Cardinal Aegidius de Torres; some 200 marks of Cardinal Colonna's money had been deposited at S. Geneviève in Paris for the benefit of Oddo Colonna, his nephew. The Pope ordered that the 200 marks be paid to Oddo Colonna or his procurator, and that his Subdeacon and Chaplain, Matteo Rosso, Parisius commoranti, be instructed to compel the agents to turn over the money to Oddo Colonna. From this, it is inferred that Matteo Rosso Orsini was studying at the University of Paris.

His name appears in a document of 13 November 1255, in which he is present in a court proceeding before Cardinal Giovanni Gaetano Orsini, his uncle, as Magister Matheus Rubeus, Canon of Laon, Papal chaplain, and providus iuris This indicates that Matteo Rosso had a teaching degree, and that it was in law. It is inferred that he took his degree at Bologna, though there is no evidence for that inference, and there are several of other possibilities. It would appear, however, that his study of the law was rather brief if he was still in Paris at the beginning of 1253, and already working at the Roman Curia in November 1255.

It is said that Matteo Rosso Orsini wrote theological tracts, but it is likely that this statement is the result of a confusion with his nephew and namesake, who was a Dominican and a theologian, and a Cardinal at Avignon (1327-1340).

It is not known when, or how, Matteo Rosso became a Canon at Laon. There is no evidence that Matteo Rosso was ever ordained a priest or consecrated a bishop.

== Cardinalate ==
Matteo Rosso was created a cardinal by Pope Urban IV (Jacques Pantaleone) in May 1262, and granted the Deaconry of S. Maria in Porticu. It is said that he held the titular church of S. Maria in Trastevere in commendam (as an Administrator). He was Archpriest of the Vatican Basilica from early in the reign of Nicholas III, who had himself been Archpriest before his election to the Papacy. In 1263 his uncle Giovanni Gaetano Orsini was named Protector of the Franciscans and the Poor Clares.

In 1264, Cardinal Matteo was appointed Apostolic Legate and Rector of the Patrimony of S. Peter in Tuscia by Pope Urban IV (1261-1264), to recover territories in Tuscany which had been usurped by various lords, especially Petrus de Vico and his German forces. Another of his tasks was to restrain the government of Siena, which was encroaching on various smaller towns in Tuscany. During the time of his legation, on 2 October 1264, Pope Urban died at Perugia, having been driven out of Orvieto, and Matteo Rosso Orsini, along with seventeen other cardinals, sat down in Perugia to elect a new Pope. It took them only five days to choose a new pope, Cardinal Guido Grosso Fulcodi (Guy Folques), but he was absent in France. He had been appointed Legate to England, but the civil war in that country prevented his crossing the channel. He finally abandoned his mission and travelled to Perugia, where, on 5 February 1265, he accepted the papal throne, and announced that he would be called Clement IV.

At the end of December 1264 Cardinal Matteo was assigned, with four other cardinals, to carry out the unction and coronation of Charles of Anjou and his wife Beatrice as King and Queen of Sicily. Charles entered Rome on 23 May 1265 and was crowned on 6 January 1266. Pope Clement had offered to crown Charles himself, if he would come to Viterbo, since Pope Clement was not welcome in Rome. But Charles insisted on being crowned in Rome.

Then came the serious negotiations. Ambassadors from King Charles presented the Pope with three requests in May 1266. First, he wanted to have the Senatorship of Rome, despite oaths he had taken and promises he had made relinquish the office and title; he wanted a dispensation. Second, he was obligated to pay the Pope 50,000 marks, which he wanted cancelled. Third, he wanted advice as to what to do about the Saracens who lived in his kingdom centered in Luceria. Pope Clement consulted with the cardinals who were in the Curia, but it happened that three cardinals were absent on assignments: Giovanni Gaetano Orsini, Giacomo Savelli, and Matteo Rosso Orsini. He therefore sent messengers to each cardinal, requesting their advice in writing. At the time, his answer to the ambassadors was that, in the case of the Senatorship, the 'way of this provision was not open to us.' Charles was running the risk of excommunication. As to the other points, the Pope put off the ambassadors until he could get input from the three absent cardinals by return messenger. The fear that Charles could not be contained is palpable. He wanted Rome and he wanted it indefinitely. At the same time, the Ghibbelines were rallying around Conradin, the son of Frederick II, placing the successes of King Charles in favor (or so it seemed) of the Guelphs in danger.

In the summer of 1266, Cardinal Matteo was appointed examiner of the election of a new Abbot for the Monastery of S. Maria de Valle Pontis in the diocese of Perugia. Papal approval was granted. In the Fall of 1267, he was an examiner into the election of Johannes Alfonsi as Archbishop of Compostella. So much irregularity was uncovered about the candidate's career that the Pope quashed the election entirely, and reserved to himself the matter of illegally held benefices and offices.

In November 1267 Henry of Castile, brother of King Alfonso of Castile, Senator of Rome, had shown himself openly as a supporter of Conradin, and had arrested numerous nobles who were relatives of Cardinal Matteo and Cardinal Giovanni Orsini, Cardinal Riccardo Annibaldi, and Cardinal Giacomo Savelli In May 1268 Cardinal Orsini was in Rome. On 17 May 1268 Pope Clement IV had to issue orders to Henry, brother of the King of Castile, who was Senator of Rome, to cease molesting Cardinal Mattheo and Cardinal Giovanni Orsini. In August 1268 Cardinal Matteo Rosso Orsini and Cardinal Giovanni Caetano Orsini were in the city of Rome when Conradin and his forces descended on the city, enraged by their defeat in the Battle of Tagliacozzo on 23 August. Among his leaders was Henry of Castile, called "The Senator", because King Charles of Anjou had appointed him to govern Rome in 1267. The city was plundered, St. Peter's was occupied and its treasury looted, and the two Orsini cardinals were roughed up and suffered material losses. Henry was excommunicated for his outrages, and it was only two decades later that he was canonically absolved.

=== Conclave of 1268–1271 ===
Pope Clement IV died on 29 November 1268 in Viterbo. There is no evidence as to the date of the beginning of the meeting to elect his successor. One cardinal, Raoul de Grosparmy, did not participate, since he was Papal Legate with the French army led by King Louis IX which was on crusade. Nineteen other cardinals, however, did assemble in Viterbo, including Matteo Rosso Orsini, and began the struggle to elect a new pope. The cardinals were more or less evenly divided into two factions, one which favored Charles of Anjou, and the other which most certainly did not. Cardinal Matteo, who had participated in the coronation of King Charles, belonged to the Angevin faction, as did his uncle. In the end the cardinals could not find one among themselves for whom a two-thirds majority would vote, let alone achieve consensus and unity. They therefore resorted to the 'Way of Compromise', appointing a committee of cardinals, three from either party, to select a candidate. Unable to agree again on one of their own number, the committee looked outside for an appropriate candidate, and found the Archdeacon of Liège, Teodaldo Visconti of Piacenza, the nephew of the Archbishop of Milan; Teodaldo's nephew was a follower of Charles of Anjou. On 1 September 1270 the cardinals summoned him to Viterbo from Acre in the Holy Land, where he was on crusade. He accepted the election and was crowned in Rome as Pope Gregory X on 27 March 1272 by his own choice of officiant, Cardinal Giovanni Gaetano Orsini, rather than by the Cardinal Protodeacon.

=== Gregory X, John XXI, and Nicholas III ===
Cardinal Matteo Rosso Orsini was one of the cardinals who travelled to France with Pope Gregory X and attended the Second Ecumenical Council of Lyons, which opened on 1 May 1274. He was with the Pope on his return trip as well, being present at the Ceremony of Rudolf of Habsburg's swearing the Oath of Fealty in Lausanne, on 20 October 1275. He was not with Gregory X, however, when he died at Arezzo on 10 January 1276. But he did arrive in time to attend the very brief one-day conclave on 20–21 January 1276, in which a dozen cardinals elected Cardinal Pierre de Tarantaise as Pope Innocent V. This was Cardinal Matteo's third conclave.

In the Winter of 1278-1279, Cardinal Matteo and Cardinal Giacomo Savelli had been appointed by Pope Nicholas III to act as negotiatiors in a dispute between King Charles I of Sicily and King Hugh III of Cyprus. Cardinal Matteo was present at the Consistory at S. Peter's on 4 May 1278, when Fr. Conradus, O. Min., the ambassador of King Rudolf, ratified the arrangements which Gregory X had made with him at Lausanne on 20 October 1275, at which Cardinal Matteo had also been present. On 23 January 1280 Cardinal Matteo and the papal notary Benedict of Anagni were sent as negotiators to attempt to arrange a peace between Rudolf, King of the Romans, and Charles of Anjou, King of Sicily. They presented a detailed memorandum on 3 February to Bishop Peter of Tripolitana about papal instructions for the embassy, as well as about the relevant materials in the papal archives.

Pope Gregory X (1271-1276) appointed Cardinal Matteo as Auditor causarum (judge) in a dispute involving the holding of benefices by canons in the diocese of Valva. He was also named Auditor in the examination of Bishop-elect Guillaume of Laon by Gregory X, but the illness and death of the Pope, followed by the election of three short-lived popes in 1276 (Cardinal Matteo's third, fourth and fifth Conclaves), deferred the case until Nicholas III settled the matter on 25 May 1278. He performed the same function as part of a commission of cardinals who examined the election and candidate for the diocese of Monreale in Sicily, Giovanni Boccamazza, the nephew of Cardinal Giacomo Savelli. Pope John XXI (1276-1277) appointed Cardinal Matteo to be Assessor in a lawsuit involving the election of an Archbishop of Magdeburg; the case continued to be a problem in 1279. In each case, the election was investigated for its adherence to canon law and the absence of simony, and each candidate was examined for his orthodoxy and moral suitability. In the case of the election of a new Archbishop of Acherenza, Cardinal Matteo was a member of a three-man cardinalatial committee that found that the election had been the subject of undue influence (oppression)and therefore contrary to canon law, and they recommended that it be annulled. He was also a member of the committee that approved the new archbishop, Peter of Archia. In the case of a double election of an Archbishop of Dublin, which had begun under Gregory X, with Cardinal Simon Paltineri as Auditor, who unfortunately died before the case was decided, John XXI handed the examination to Cardinal Matteo, but after Pope John's death, Pope Nicholas III decided to provide a new archbishop himself. When the proctors of William de Wickwane, the Archbishop-elect of York, presented his case for confirmation, Cardinal Matteo was one of the examiners, and, on a technicality, the election was quashed. Pope Nicholas, however, immediately appointed Wickwane anyway, using the plenitude of his power as Pope, and granted him the pallium.

=== Nicholas III (1277-1280) ===
In 1278-1279, Cardinal Matteo's father, Matteo Rosso Orsini, was elected Senator of Rome by his brother, Nicholas III. On 12 March 1278, Nicholas III created nine new cardinals, three of whom were relatives—Latino Malabranca Orsini, Giordano Orsini, and Giacomo Colonna. Five of the new cardinals were members of religious orders. Only one new cardinal was French, Erhard de Lessines (Lesigny), son of Guillaume, Marshal of Champagne, but he died on 18 July 1278, of dysentery. These appointments provoked a sharp response from the chronicler of Parma, the Franciscan friar Salimbene (tr. Robert Brentano, p. 187):

The fourth cardinal among the pope's relatives was lord Giordano, the pope's brother, a man of little learning, rather like a layman. But because flesh and blood told, he made him cardinal. So he made those four cardinals from his own family (parentela). So he built, as other Roman popes had, Sion on his own blood, of which Miceas III says, "who builds Sion on blood and Jerusalem on iniquity." I believe certainly on my conscience, I am persuaded, that there are a thousand friars minor of the Order of Saint Francis (of which order I am a minor and inferior friar) who are better suited to be raised to the cardinalate both by reason of their learning and their saintly lives, than many of those who by reason of their being related to the Roman pontiff are elevated.

The goal behind Nicholas' choices, however, was obvious−the diminution of the French, and especially the Angevin influence in the College of Cardinals. Nicholas also appointed his own nephew, Cardinal Latino's cousin, Bertoldus Orsini (son of Gentile Orsini), to be Rector of the Romandiola and of the City of Bologna (most of the Po Valley, south of the Po), and Cardinal Latino himself was named Papal Legate to the Romandiola. Another nephew, Orso Orsini, was named Rector of the Patrimony of S. Peter in Tuscany; he was also Podestà of Viterbo. Nepotism thus diminished King Charles' control over Rome and central Italy.

In 1280, Cardinal Matteo Rosso Orsini was Auditor causarum (Judge) in a case involving the Bishop of Brescia and a Canon of Parma. When Robert Kilwardby, Archbishop of Canterbury was promoted to the cardinalate on 12 March 1278, leaving the See of Canterbury vacant, the electors chose the Bishop of Bath and Wells, Robert Burnell as his successor; but his translation to Canterbury was refused by Pope Nicholas III, and John Peckham was appointed instead; then Robert Burnell was elected to the vacancy at Winchester following the death of Nicholas Ely, and that election was submitted for examination to a committee of cardinals which included Cardinal Matteo, but the Pope decided that he could not allow that translation either, though it was in proper form, as a matter of principle.

Pope Nicholas III died at the papal country residence at Soriano, east of Viterbo, on 22 August 1280. Most of the Roman Curia were resident in Viterbo itself. This was the signal for an uprising of the dissidents in Rome, led by the Colonna and the Annibaldi, led by Riccardo Annibaldi. The Annibaldi and their allies were able to drive out the Orsini-appointed Senators. They also reached an understanding with King Charles. In Viterbo, the Podestà of the city, Orso Orsini, the Pope's nephew was unable to maintain his position and was ousted by forces led by Riccardo Annibaldi and supported by King Charles. The Conclave therefore fell into the hands of the opponents of the Orsini. There were thirteen cardinals at the death of Nicholas III, and they were as bitterly divided into two factions as were the people of Rome. The Conclave began in early September but it dragged on through the rest of 1280 and through January 1281 without any successful election.

Then, on 2 February 1281, a remarkable incident took place. Riccardo Annibaldi and six of his henchmen made an attack on the Conclave, which he was supposed to be protecting, and kidnapped two of the Orsini Cardinals, Matteo Rosso Orsini and Giordano Orsini, Pope Nicholas' brother. Another of the eyewitnesses, Cardinal Giacomo Savelli, puts the responsibility on the people of Viterbo, who had a history of unruliness and disrespect for the Roman Curia. They had promised, moreover, that they would neither enclose nor confine the cardinals. It is even said that a third Orsini was taken, Cardinal Latino Malabranca, but that he was released almost immediately. Cardinal Giordano Orsini was released after three days imprisonment. Cardinal Matteo Rosso Orsini, however, was kept in confinement until after the Conclave had concluded. The result, whoever bore the responsibility, was the breaking of the deadlock in the Conclave. Without the Orsini, and in the midst of a good deal of fear, the thinking of the cardinals was forced to change. Nonetheless, it took nearly three more weeks for them to agree on the Frenchman, Cardinal Simon de Brion, the strongest supporter of King Charles in the entire Conclave. He was elected on 22 February 1281 and took the throne name Martin IV.

=== Martin IV (1281-1285) ===
Immediately after his election, Pope Martin sent two cardinals to Rome to patch up a reconciliation between the city and the Papacy, which would allow him to be crowned at S. Peter's Basilica. The Orsini cardinal, Latino Malabranca, Cardinal Matteo's cousin, was one of the intermediaries, the other was Cardinal Geoffrey of Alatri. They were, as Pope Martin put it in his letter to the Romans, his 'angels of peace'. His overtures were rejected by the Romans. Because of the behavior of the people of Viterbo, he refused to be crowned there, and took the Papal Court instead to Orvieto, where he was consecrated and crowned on 23 March 1281. In a nice piece of irony, he was consecrated a bishop by an Orsini, Cardinal Latino Malabranca, the Bishop of Ostia, who held the traditional right.

Pope Martin (Simon de Brion) immediately began to reverse the anti-Angevin policy of his predecessor, Nicholas III (Orsini). The Orsini family lost many of their positions of power. Cardinal Latino Malabranca was replaced as papal Legate in the Romandiola, as was his brother Bertholdus Orsini, who had been Rector of the Romandiola. The People of Rome named Martin IV as their Senator, in his capacity as a private person, not in his capacity as Pope. they gave him the right to appoint anyone he pleased as his Vicar. He appointed King Charles of Sicily. In April 1281 King Charles was appointed Senator of Rome, in violation of a decree of Nicholas III, but the election was immediately approved by Martin IV.

When the Abbot of S. Paolo fuori le mure died in 1282, and Jacobus de Roma was elected the new Abbot, the examination of the election was assigned to a committee which included Cardinal Matteo Rosso Orsini; but Jacobus renounced the election, and Pope Martin appointed Abbot Bartolomeo of S. Gregorio Magno to the office. On 17 June 1282 Pope Martin confirmed the election of John, a monk of Montecassino, as Archbishop of Benevento, after the election was examined by a committee of cardinals including Matteo Rosso Orsini. He performed the same function in the case of the Monastery of S. Alexander in Parma and the appointment of Abbess Margarita de Campilio; and the case of the Monastery of S. Victorino in Benevento and the appointment of Abbess Mabilia; and in the case of the Monastery of S. Benedetto de Padolirone in the diocese of Mantua, and the contested election of an abbot.

Pope Martin had assigned him to another examination committee, that for the election of an archbishop of Nidrosia (Trondheim in Norway), but the Pope died just as the matter was completed in January 1285, and it was left to Honorius IV (Savelli) to actually send the bull. A similar situation arose with the matter of the election of the Bishop of Châlons-sur-Marne, and though Cardinal Matthew had been appointed to the examination committee by Pope Martin, it was Honorius IV who made the final decision to approve the election.

King Charles I of Naples lost the Island of Sicily in 1282 as a result of the uprising called the "Sicilian Vespers". On 22 January 1284 the City of Rome drove out the forces of King Charles in an uprising of their own. His Vicar was imprisoned, and his own Senatorship was cancelled. Pope Martin, who was a perpetual exile from Rome, and really had no influence, agreed to the appointment of two new Vicars, Annibaldo Annibaldi and Pandolfo Savelli, the brother of Cardinal Jacopo Savelli. The troublemaker from the Conclave of 1281 in Viterbo, Riccardo Annibaldi, was compelled to do penance at the residence of Cardinal Matteo Rosso Orsini. Charles finally died on 7 January 1285. His creature, Pope Martin, was desolate and abandoned. Martin IV died at Perugia on 28 March 1285, after a three-day illness. At the time of his death there were eighteen cardinals, fifteen of whom attended the Conclave of 1285. This was Cardinal Matteo Rosso Orsini's eighth Conclave. The opening ceremonies of the Conclave, unusually, took place only four days after the death of the Pope, on 1 April. There was no compulsory enclosure at Perugia, as there had been in Viterbo in 1281. Next morning, 2 April, Cardinal Jacopo Savelli was elected pope on the first scrutiny.

=== Honorius IV (1285-1287) ===
Pope Honorius IV (Savelli) appointed Cardinal Orsini to an examination committee on the election of a new Abbot of the Benedictine Monastery of Montecassino; the bulls were finally issued on 28 September 1285, and Abbot Thomas was approved. In the Summer of 1285, Cardinal Orsini had been a member of a committee to examine the election of an Abbess of the Monastery of Cala (Kalensis, Chelles) in the diocese of Paris, but the election was contested and dragged through several appeals, reaching a final settlement on 5 September 1285, with the confirmation of Abess Margarita.

Upon the death of Cardinal Goffredo d' Alatri in the Spring of 1287, Cardinal Matteo Rosso became the senior cardinal-deacon, Prior Diaconum (or Protodeacon). It was the function of the Prior Diaconum to announce the election of a new pope for popular acclamation, and to crown the new pope.

Pope Honorius IV died in Rome at his palace next to Santa Sabina on the Aventine on 3 April 1287. He was buried on Holy Saturday, 5 April, in Saint Peter's Basilica, next to Nicholas III. The papal throne was vacant for more than ten months.

=== Nicholas IV (1288-1292) ===
On 25 April 1288 Cardinal Matteo Rosso Orsini was granted by Pope Nicholas IV (Masci) the Canonicate and Prebendary of Lincoln cathedral, which had been vacated by the death of Pietro Savelli. This provided him with additional income. On 10 May 1291, Pope Nicholas wrote to King Edward I of England, asking him not to take it amiss that he had granted prebends in York Minster and at Lincoln to Cardinal Matteo.

On 28 May 1288 Cardinal Matthew was sent to Perugia with Cardinal Benedetto of S. Nicolai in Carcere to redress injuries done to Foligno.

On 10 May 1291 Cardinal Orsini is mentioned as Master of the Hospital of S. Spirito in Sassia in the Borgo. He had been appointed by his uncle, Nicholas III. The Cardinal was already Protector of the Ordo Fratrum Minorum (Franciscans) by 1278, in succession to his uncle Pope Nicholas III, an honor confirmed on 7 May 1288 by Nicholas IV. As such he was the principal spokesman in the Roman Curia for all Franciscan business that was transacted with the Holy See. In 1291 Cardinal Matteo Rosso was named Protector of the Monastery of S. Clare in Assisi and the Order of Poor Clares.

Pope Nicholas IV died in Rome on Holy Saturday, 4 April 1292, in the Patriarchal residence at the Liberian Basilica (Santa Maria Maggiore)

=== Celestine V (1294) ===
Twelve cardinals attended the funeral of Pope Nicholas IV in S. Maria Maggiore. Six were Romans, four were from elsewhere in Italy, two were French. One, Cardinal Jean Cholet, died during the Sede Vacante. Of the Romans, three belonged to the Orsini faction, three belonged to the Colonna faction. It was Cardinal Matteo Rosso Orsini's tenth Conclave. The papal throne was vacant for two years and three months. The Conclave ought to have begun on 15 April but the senior Cardinal Bishop, Latino Malabranca Orsini had difficulties in assembling the cardinals at S. Maria Maggiore. With a civil war between Orsini and Colonna in progress, neither side wished to entrust its safety to anyone. Cardinal Malabranca then tried to assemble at Santa Sabina, which was distant from the center of Rome and had fortifications, but that too was unacceptable, as was a final desperate suggestion of Santa Maria sopra Minerva. Instead of assembling, the cardinals began to disperse. Benedetto Caetani went to Anagni, his home town. Four other cardinals retired to the cooler air of Reate. On 2 August Cardinal Cholet died. Throughout 1293 there was anarchy in Rome, and no conclave. The cardinals negotiated with each other through messengers and finally agreed to meet in Perugia, far from the strife of Rome, on 23 October 1293. Even then, there was no decision. King Charles II of Naples visited the Cardinals and harangued them, but to no effect. The two year mark since the death of the pope passed.

The six Roman cardinals had the majority of the eleven votes, but they would never agree on one of their own number on either side as Pope. At the same time, together they could block the election of any of the non-Roman cardinals. But the non-Romans, as it happened, had no cause or personality to rally around. Finally, in early July 1294, during a meeting of the cardinals in Perugia, Cardinal Boccamati and Cardinal Latino Malabranca Orsini made casual mention of some visions they had heard about. Cardinal Caetani asked whether they were talking about a vision received by Brother Peter, the hermit of Mount Murrone near Sulmone (who had received approval for his little religious group from Pope Gregory X at the Council of Lyons). Latino Orsini replied in the affirmative, and Brother Peter became the subject of discussion. Suddenly and unanimously, on Monday 5 July 1294, the Cardinals elected Peter da Murrone pope. Matteo Rosso Orsini was one of the eleven cardinals who signed their names to the Electoral Decree. Celestine V was crowned in L'Aquila on 29 August 1294, by the prior Diaconum, Cardinal Matteo Rosso Orsini.

The new Pope, who was not eager to leave L'Aquila, let alone take up residence in the chaotic city of Rome, allowed himself to be persuaded by his friend and protector, Charles II, to visit Naples. Though several cardinals feared King Charles, and all dreaded the influence that he would exercise over the inexperienced hermit, they could not dissuade Celestine, who transferred the Roman Curia to Naples and took up residence in the Castel Nuovo. He immediately appointed a dozen new cardinals, including King Charles' chancellor, two members of his own little community of monks (Celestines), three Benedictines, and seven who had French connections. These creatures of Charles and Celestine began to transact papal business without reference to the old Cardinals, and knowing the traditions and practices of the Curia. It was charged that corruption was rife. Cardinals began to agitate for Celestine to resign. Celestine himself missed his hermitage, and even had a replica built in one of the rooms of the Castel Nuovo; he also began to realize that he was inadequate for the position to which he had been elected. Cardinal Benedetto Caetani and several other prevailed upon Celestine to resign his office. Finally, on 13 December 1294, after additional consultations and having taken legal counsel, Celestine V laid down his tiara and resigned the Papacy. Following the regulations of Gregory X, the opening ceremonies of the Conclave to elect a successor to Celestine V would have been held on 23 December and the voting (scrutiny) would have begun on 24 December.

=== Boniface VIII (1294-1303) ===
There is a modern hypothesis that Matteo Rosso Orsini was elected Pope in December 1294. The basis of this hypothesis is a statement in a chronicle of the German Siegfried von Ballhausen, "Therefore in the same year on the Vigil of the Birth of the Lord [24 December], when the cardinals were assembled for the election, on the first scrutiny Lord Matheus Rubeus the Cardinal Archdeacon was elected. On his refusal of the papacy, they proceeded to a second scrutiny, with no result. On the third scrutiny, though, Lord Benedict was elected..." This statement was taken up and treated seriously in an article published in 1923 by Raffaello Morghen. Grave doubt, however, has been expressed by Peter Herde, Paola Pavan, Agostino Paravacini-Bagliani, Andreas Fischer, Jochen Johrendt, and others. A contemporary witness, Cardinal Jacopo Stefaneschi, Matteo Rosso's nephew, clearly states that Cardinal Caetani, not Cardinal Orsini, had the majority of votes on the first scrutiny, and that he won the required two-thirds majority on the Accessio (opportunity to change votes, after the initial scrutiny is announced), on the same day. Pope Boniface VIII (Caetani), himself, says that he was elected on the Accessio after the Scrutiny. Everything was accomplished on Christmas Eve, not over several days.

Pope Boniface VIII named him Protector of the Monastery of S. Silvestro in Rome, where the Pope had installed a community of Poor Clares.

Matteo Rosso Orsini was one of the Roman barons who organized a mission to rescue Pope Boniface VIII, who had been attacked at Anagni on 7 September 1303 by a force of French soldiers led by Guillaume de Nogaret and abetted by the two deposed Colonna cardinals and their family. After being held in captivity for three days, the Pope was rescued by loyal citizens of Anagni on 9 September, and managed to escape the city and the French. His party was met on the highway to Rome by the Orsini and escorted to the Lateran Palace, the first place the party came to as it reached the city on 25 September; he spent two days there. But he was quickly taken to greater safety at the Castel S. Angelo, which was in the hands of the Orsini, and finally, ill and dying, brought to the papal palace at S. Peter's.

Pope Boniface died in the Vatican Palace on 11 October 1303. There were eighteen cardinals living at the time of his death; there were also two deposed Cardinals, Jacopo and Pietro Colonna, who did not participate in the Conclave of 1303. The Conclave was held, as Benedict XI himself says in his Electoral Manifesto, Opera divinae potentiae ('The works of divine power'), in the palace at St. Peter's. Cardinal Niccolò Boccasini, the former Master General of the Dominicans, was elected Pope Benedict XI on the first ballot, on 22 October 1303. He was crowned on Sunday 27 October by Cardinal Matteo Rosso Orsini, the prior Diaconum. King Charles II of Naples and his son were present.

On 4 June 1304 Pope Benedict XI appointed Cardinal Orsini as gubernator of the Chapel of S. Vincent, which was located between the Vatican Basilica and the Vatican Palace. This expanded slightly the administrative power which he already possessed as Archpriest of the Vatican Basilica.

The Cardinal was a friend and regular informant of King James II of Aragon, and recipient of his largesse

=== Conclave (1304-1305) ===
The Conclave of 1304-1305, following the death of Pope Benedict XI at Perugia on 7 July 1304, was Cardinal Orsini's thirteenth conclave. Unfortunately, though he was able to attend the opening of the Conclave in Perugia, he was ill, and left the Conclave area before the final voting took place. When Archbishop Bertrand de Got of Bordeaux was elected pope on 5 July 1305, the Cardinals sent representatives to obtain Cardinal Orsini's consent to the election, he is said to have refused for a time. In the end, however, he was prevailed upon to consent.

== Death ==
Matteo Rosso Orsini died in Perugia on 4 September 1305, two months after the conclusion of the Conclave. Nine years after his death, his body was removed to Rome and interred in the Vatican Basilica, of which he had been Archpriest. The tomb was destroyed during the demolitions carried on under Pope Julius II. His memorial inscription survives.

== Bibliography ==
- Lorenzo Cardella, Memorie storiche de' cardinali della Santa Romana Chiesa Tomo II (Roma 1792), pp. 308–310.
- Augustin Demski, Papst Nikolaus III, Eine Monographie (Münster 1903).
- Richard Sternfeld, Der Kardinal Johann Gaetan Orsini (Papst Nikolaus III.) 1244-1277 (Berlin: E. Ebering 1905).
- Ferdinand Gregorovius, History of Rome in the Middle Ages, Volume V. 2 second edition, revised (London: George Bell, 1906).
- Albert Huyskens, "Das Kapitel von S. Peter in Rom unter dem Einflusse der Orsini (1276-1342)," Historisches Jahrbuch 27 (1906) 266-290. (in German)
- August Haag, Matteo Rosso Orsini, Kardinaldiakon von S. Maria in Porticu, Blätter zur Geschichte des Kardinalats im ausgehenden dreizehnten und beginnenden vierzehnten Jahrhundert (Freiburg: Caristas-Druckerei, 1912). (in German)
- R. Morghen, "Il cardinale Matteo Rosso Orsini," Archivio della Reale Società romana di storia patria 46 (1923), 271-372. (in Italian)
- Francesco Frascarelli, "Orsini, Matteo Rosso", Enciclopedia Dantesca (1970).
- Agostino Paravicini Bagliani, Cardinali di curia e "familiae" cardinalizie 2 volumes (Padova: Antenore 1972). (in Italian)
- Raffaello Morghen, "Il cardinale Matteo Rosso Orsini e la crisi del pontificato romano alla fine del XIII secolo," in Tradizione religiosa nella civiltà dell’Occidente cristiano (Roma: Istituto storico italiano per il Medio Evo 1979), pp. 109–142. (in Italian)
- Agostino Paravicini Bagliani, I testamenti dei cardinali del Duecento (Roma 1980), pp. 75–76. (in Italian)
- Robert Brentano, Rome Before Avignon: A Social History of Thirteenth Century Rome (Berkeley-Los Angeles: University of California Press 1990).
- F. Allegrezza, Organizzazione del potere e dinamiche familiari. Gli Orsini dal Duecento al Quattrocento (Roma 1998). (in Italian)
- Jochen Johrendt, Die Diener des Apostelfürsten: das Kapitel von St. Peter im Vatikan (11.-13. Jahrhundert) (Berlin: Walter de Gruyter, 2011), pp. 186, 451-452. (in German)
- Paola Pavan, "Orsini, Matteo Rosso" Dizionario Biografico degli Italiani Volume 79 (2013). (in Italian)
