= Nicholas of Bar =

Bishop of Mâcon (died 1310)

Nicholas of Bar (died 16 May 1310) was the bishop of Mâcon from 1286 until his death.

According to a posthumous document, Nicholas was the "son of Poncetus of Bar in the diocese of Tulle". His obituary in the register of his alma mater, however, gives his namesake as Bar-le-Duc. Given family connections to Lorraine there can be no doubt that the latter is correct. His uncle was Cardinal Geoffroy de Bar, who secured his appointment by Pope Honorius IV as bishop in 1286.

Nicholas died on 16 May 1310. An alumnus of the College of Sorbonne, he was a rich man at his death who left the college eighteen manuscripts plus all his possessions in the diocese of Paris. Although he intended that one professor and two students should be sustained on his bequest, this was reduced to only a single student of his own family or else from Lorraine.

One of the manuscripts he gave to the Sorbonne is the original manuscript of Thomas of Ireland's Manipulus florum, which the author had given him. It is now Paris, Bibliothèque nationale de France, lat. 15985. Another is that collection of 170 quodlibetal disputations that he commissioned. The first six questions in this collection are anonymous and may be from Nicholas' own disputation. They probably date to 1285–1286. The manuscript, now Paris, Bibliothèque nationale de France, lat. 15850, probably dates from before 1303–1304.

== Bibliography ==
- Glorieux, Palémon (1929). La littérature quodlibétique de 1260 à 1320. Vol. 1. Le Saulchoir.
- Glorieux, Palémon (1935). La littérature quodlibétique de 1260 à 1320. Vol. 2. Le Saulchoir.
- La Rochette, Charles de (1867). Histoire des évêques de Mâcon. Vol. 2. Mâcon.
- Piron, Sylvain (2007). "Nicholas of Bar's Collection". In Schabel, Christopher (ed.). Theological Quodlibeta in the Middle Ages: The Fourteenth Century. Brill. pp. 333–343.
