= Cardinals created by Nicholas IV =

Catholic appointments in 1288

Pope Nicholas IV (r. 1288–1292) created six Cardinals in one consistory celebrated on May 16, 1288:

- Bernardo de Berardi (Berardus Calliensis), bishop of Osimo — cardinal-bishop of Palestrina, † August 5, 1291
- Hugh Aycelin, O.P. — cardinal-priest of S. Sabina, then cardinal-bishop of Ostia e Velletri (August 1294), † December 28, 1297
- Matteo de Acquasparta, O.F.M., minister general of his order — cardinal-priest of S. Lorenzo in Damaso, then cardinal-bishop of Porto e Santa Rufina (September 22, 1291), † October 28, 1302
- Pietro Peregrosso, vice-chancellor of the Holy Roman Church — cardinal-deacon of S. Giorgio in Velabro, then cardinal-priest of S. Marco (December 18, 1288), † August 1, 1295
- Napoleone Orsini Frangipani — cardinal-deacon of S. Adriano, † March 23, 1342
- Pietro Colonna — cardinal-deacon of S. Eustachio; deposed on May 10, 1297 by Pope Boniface VIII; restored by Clement V on December 15, 1305 as cardinal-deacon without a title; then cardinal-deacon of S. Angelo (March 2, 1317), † January 7, 1326

== Sources ==
- Konrad Eubel: Hierarchia Catholica Medii Aevi, vol. 1, Münster 1913
- Miranda, Salvador. "Consistories for the creation of Cardinals, 13th Century (1198-1303): Nicholas IV (1288-1292)". The Cardinals of the Holy Roman Church. Florida International University. OCLC 53276621.
