= Giordano Orsini (died 1287) =

Italian cardinal

His Eminence Giordano Orsini
- Cardinal deacon of Sant'Eustachio

Orders
- Created cardinal: 12 March 1278
- Rank: Cardinal deacon

Personal details
- Born: 13th century Rome, Italy
- Died: 8 September 1287 Rome, Italy

Giordano Orsini (? in Rome – 8 September 1287, in Rome) was an Italian cardinal. He was the cardinal deacon of Sant'Eustachio from 1278.

== Life ==
He was born to the noble Orsini family, and was the brother of Pope Nicholas III (r. 1277–80). In the consistory of 12 March 1278, Pope Nicholas III created him cardinal, assigning to him the diaconate of Sant'Eustachio. He underwrote the papal bulls from 3 February to 28 June 1279 and then from 17 September 1285 to 11 June 1286. He participated in the 1280–1281 conclave that elected Pope Martin IV (r. 1281–5). He was dismissed from the conclave by representatives of the people of Viterbo, who accused him of wanting to hinder the election of the new pope, but later returned and took part in the conclave for the election. He also participated in the conclave of 1285 that elected Pope Honorius IV (r. 1285–7). He died during the sede vacante after the death of Honorius IV.

Monte Giordano, an artificial hill in rione Ponte lying southeast of Ponte Sant'Angelo, historically a stronghold of the Orsini family, takes possibly its name from him
