= Pope Nicholas IV =

Head of the Catholic Church from 1288 to 1292

- Bishop of Rome
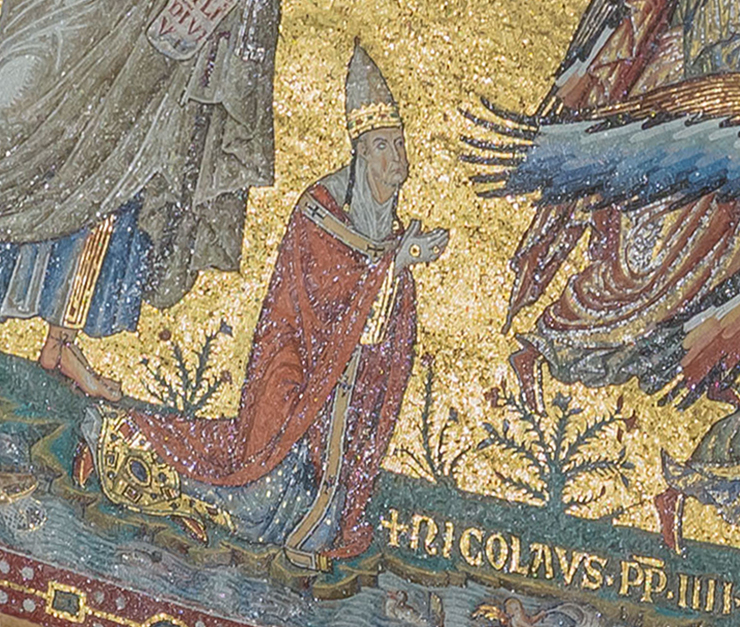
- Portrait in the apse of Santa Maria Maggiore, Rome
- Church: Catholic Church
- Papacy began: 22 February 1288
- Papacy ended: 4 April 1292
- Predecessor: Honorius IV
- Successor: Celestine V
- Previous posts: Minister General of Order of Friars Minor (1274–1279); Cardinal-Priest of Santa Pudenziana (1278–1281); Cardinal-Bishop of Palestrina (1281–1288)

Orders
- Consecration: 1281
- Created cardinal: 12 March 1278 by Nicholas III

Personal details
- Born: Girolamo Masci; 30 September 1227 Lisciano, Kingdom of Naples
- Died: 4 April 1292 (aged 64) Rome, Papal States
- Coat of arms

Pope Nicholas IV (Latin: Nicolaus IV; born Girolamo Masci; 30 September 1227 – 4 April 1292) was head of the Catholic Church and leader of the Papal States from 22 February 1288 to his death, on 4 April 1292. He was the first Franciscan to be elected pope.

== Early life ==
Jerome Masci (Girolamo Masci) was born on 30 September 1227 at Lisciano, near Ascoli Piceno. He was a pious, peace-loving man whose goals as a Franciscan friar were to protect the Church, promote the crusades, and root out heresy. According to Heinrich of Rebdorf, he was a Doctor of Theology. As a Franciscan friar, he had been elected the Order's superior (minister) for Dalmatia during the Franciscan general chapter held at Pisa in 1272. Pope Gregory X (1271-1276), was sending a legate to the Byzantine emperor, Michael VIII Palaiologos, in 1272, to invite the participation of Byzantine prelates in the Second Council of Lyons. The pope's ambition was to achieve a reunion of Eastern and Western Christendom. St Bonaventure, then minister general of the Order of Friars Minor (Franciscans), was asked to select four Franciscans to accompany the legation as nuncios. He chose Friar Jerome Masci as one of the four. When Bonaventure died suddenly during the fifth session of the Order's General Chapter at Lyons on 15 July 1274, Friar Jerome Masci was elected to succeed him as the Franciscan minister general, even though he was absent at the time, only then returning with the Byzantine delegates from the embassy to Constantinople.

Jerome was the associate of John of Vercelli, master general of the Dominican Order, when the latter was sent by Pope Nicholas III (Giovanni Caetani Orsini) on 15 October 1277, to arrange a peace between Philip IV of France and Alfonso III of Aragon. Jerome and John of Vercelli were again appointed to the same task on 4 April 1278. At the same time, Jerome was ordered to continue for the time being as the Franciscan Minister General.

In 1278 Jerome was made cardinal priest by Pope Nicholas III, and at some point after 16 May 1279 was assigned the titular church of Santa Pudenziana. Even after his appointment as a cardinal, he was allowed to remain as minister general of the Franciscans until the next general chapter. In the event, however, he was unable to attend the chapter for reasons of ill health, as a letter of apology of Pope Nicholas III, written in May 1279, indicates. On 12 April 1281 he was promoted to cardinal bishop of Palestrina by Pope Martin IV.

== Pontificate ==
=== Papal conclave ===
After the death of Pope Honorius IV on 3 April 1287, a conclave was held in Rome, at the papal palace next to Santa Sabina on the Aventine Hill, where Pope Honorius had died. This was in accordance with the Constitution Ubi periculum of Pope Gregory X. At the beginning, in April, there were thirteen cardinals in Rome; three cardinals—Gerardo Bianchi, Giovanni Boccamati, and Jean Cholet—did not attend at all. The Sacred College was for a time hopelessly divided in its selection of a successor. When six of the electors died during the year 1287 (Ancher Pantaleon, Geoffrey de Bar, Hugh of Evesham, Giordano Orsini, Comes de Casanate, and Goffredo of Alatri—some, at least, carried off by fever), the others, with the sole exception of Jerome Masci, left the conclave and returned to their homes. It was not until the following year that they reassembled. The electors at that time were seven in number: Jerome Masci, along with Latino Malabranca, Bentivenga de Bentivengis, Bernard de Languissel, Matteo Rosso Orsini, Giacomo Colonna, and Benedetto Caetani. On 15 February 1288, the survivors unanimously elected Jerome Masci, to the papacy on the first scrutiny. It is said that the cardinals were impressed by his steadfastness in remaining at the papal palace, but there is no real documentation as to their motives. As he admitted in his electoral manifesto, Cardinal Masci was extremely reluctant to accept, and indeed he persisted in his refusal for an entire week. Finally, on 22 February, he gave in and agreed. He became the first Franciscan pope and chose the name Nicholas IV in remembrance of Nicholas III, who had made him a cardinal.

=== New cardinals ===
Given the considerable losses to the numbers of the Sacred College in 1286 and 1287, it is not surprising that Nicholas IV quickly proceeded to fill vacancies. What is surprising is that he did not even reach the number of cardinals who were alive under Honorius IV, let alone exceed it. On 16 May 1288, he named six new cardinals: Bernardus Calliensis, Bishop of Osimo (who died in 1291), Hugues Aiscelin (Seguin) de Billon, OP, of the diocese of Clermont in the Auvergne; Matthew of Aquasparta in Tuscany, minister general of the Franciscans since 1287; Pietro Peregrosso of Milan, the vice-chancellor of the Holy Roman Church; Napoleone Orsini; and Pietro Colonna.

Nicholas IV issued an important constitution on 18 July 1289, which granted to the cardinals one-half of all income accruing to the Holy See and a share in the financial management, thereby paving the way for that independence of the College of Cardinals which, in the following century, was to be of detriment to the papacy.

=== Actions ===
In regard to the question of the Sicilian succession, as feudal suzerain of the kingdom, Nicholas annulled the treaty, concluded in 1288 through the mediation of Edward I of England, which confirmed James II of Aragon in the possession of the island of Sicily. This treaty had not properly seen to papal interests. In May 1289 he crowned Charles II as king of Sicily after the latter had expressly recognized papal suzerainty, and in February 1291 concluded a treaty with Kings Alfonso III of Aragon and Philip IV of France looking toward the expulsion of James from Sicily.

In 1288 Nicholas met with the Nestorian Christian Rabban Bar Sauma from China.

In August 1290 he granted the status of studium generale to the university that King Denis of Portugal has just founded a few months earlier in the city of Lisbon.

The loss of Acre in 1291 stirred Nicholas IV to renewed enthusiasm for a crusade. He sent missionaries, among them the Franciscan John of Monte Corvino, to labour among the Bulgarians, Ethiopians, Mongols, Tatars and Chinese.

== Death ==
Nicholas IV died in Rome on 4 April 1292, in the palace which he had built next to the Liberian Basilica (S. Maria Maggiore). He was buried in the Basilica di Santa Maria Maggiore. His epitaph reads: "Here lies Nicolas IV son of St. Francis" (Hic requiescit / Nicolaus PP Quartus / Filius Beati Francisci). His death lies on Good Friday, being 2 days before Easter Sunday on 6 April 1292 (in the Julian calendar).

== Taxatio ==
The 1291–92 Taxatio he initiated, which was a detailed valuation for ecclesiastical taxation of English and Welsh parish churches and prebends, remains an important source document for the medieval period. An edition was reprinted by the Record Commission in 1802 as Taxatio Ecclesiastica Angliae et Walliae Auctoritate.

== See also ==
- Cardinals created by Nicholas IV
- List of popes

== Bibliography ==
- Otto Schiff, Studien zur Geschichte Papst Nikolaus' IV. (Berlin 1897) (Historiswche Studien 5).
- Gustavo Parisciani, Nicolò IV, fra Girolamo Masci d' Ascoli, primo papa francescano. VII centenario del pontificato 1288-1292. (Ancona 1988).
- Antonio Franchi, Nicolaus papa IV 1288-1292 (Girolamo d'Ascoli) (Ascoli Piceno 1990).
- Giulia Barone, "Niccolo IV," Enciclopedia dei papi (Roma 2000) I, pp. 455–459.

Catholic Church titles
Preceded by Bonaventure	Minister General of the Order of Friars Minor; 1274–1279	Succeeded by Bonagratia de San Giovanni in Persiceto
Preceded by Honorius IV	Pope; 22 February 1288 – 4 April 1292	Succeeded by Celestine V
