= Geoffroy de Bar =

French cardinal and member of the Roman Curia

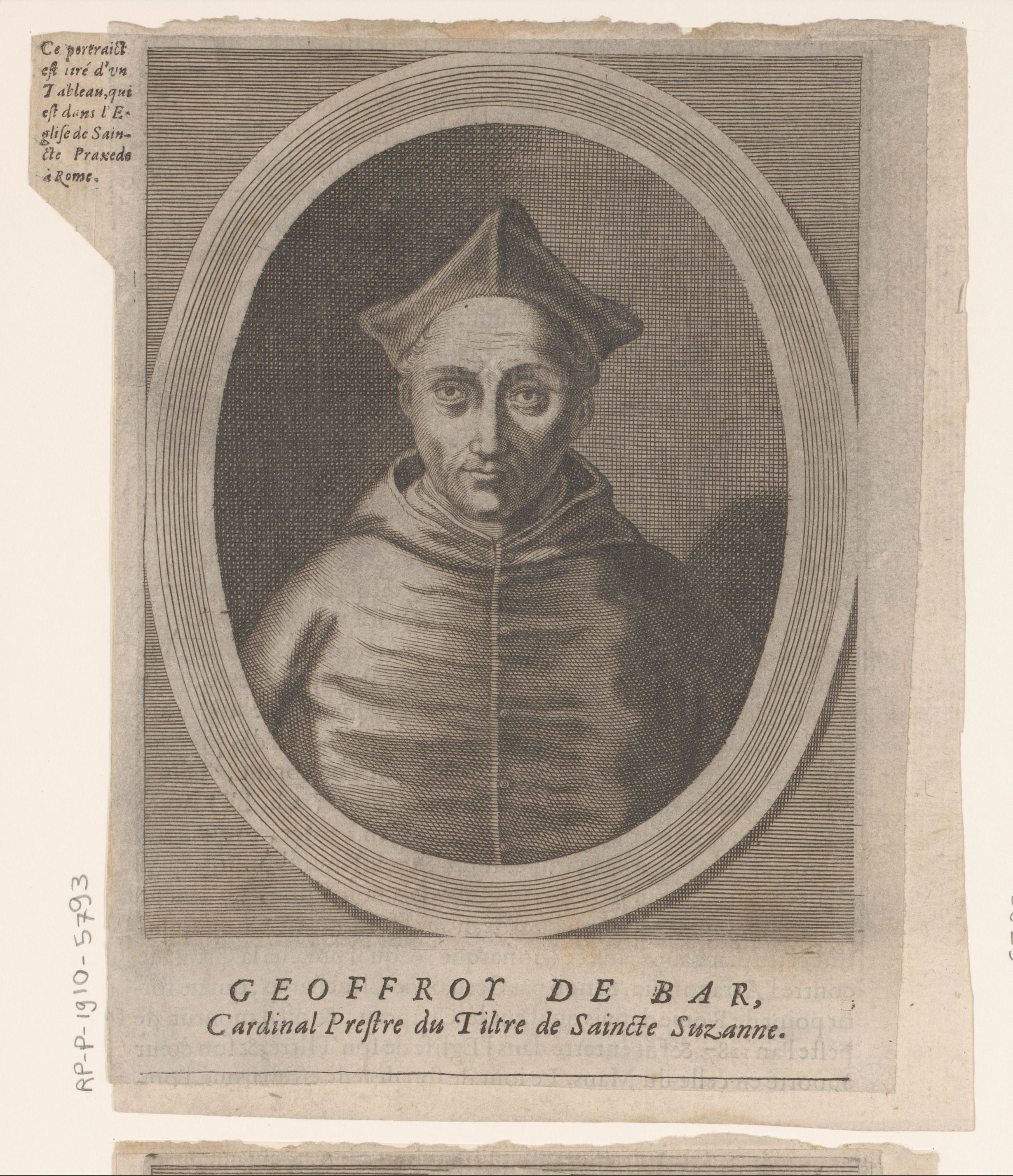
Geoffroy de Bar

Geoffroy de Bar (in Latin: Gaufridus de Barro) or Barbeau, of Burgundy, was a French cardinal and member of the Roman Curia. He died in 1287.

== Early career ==
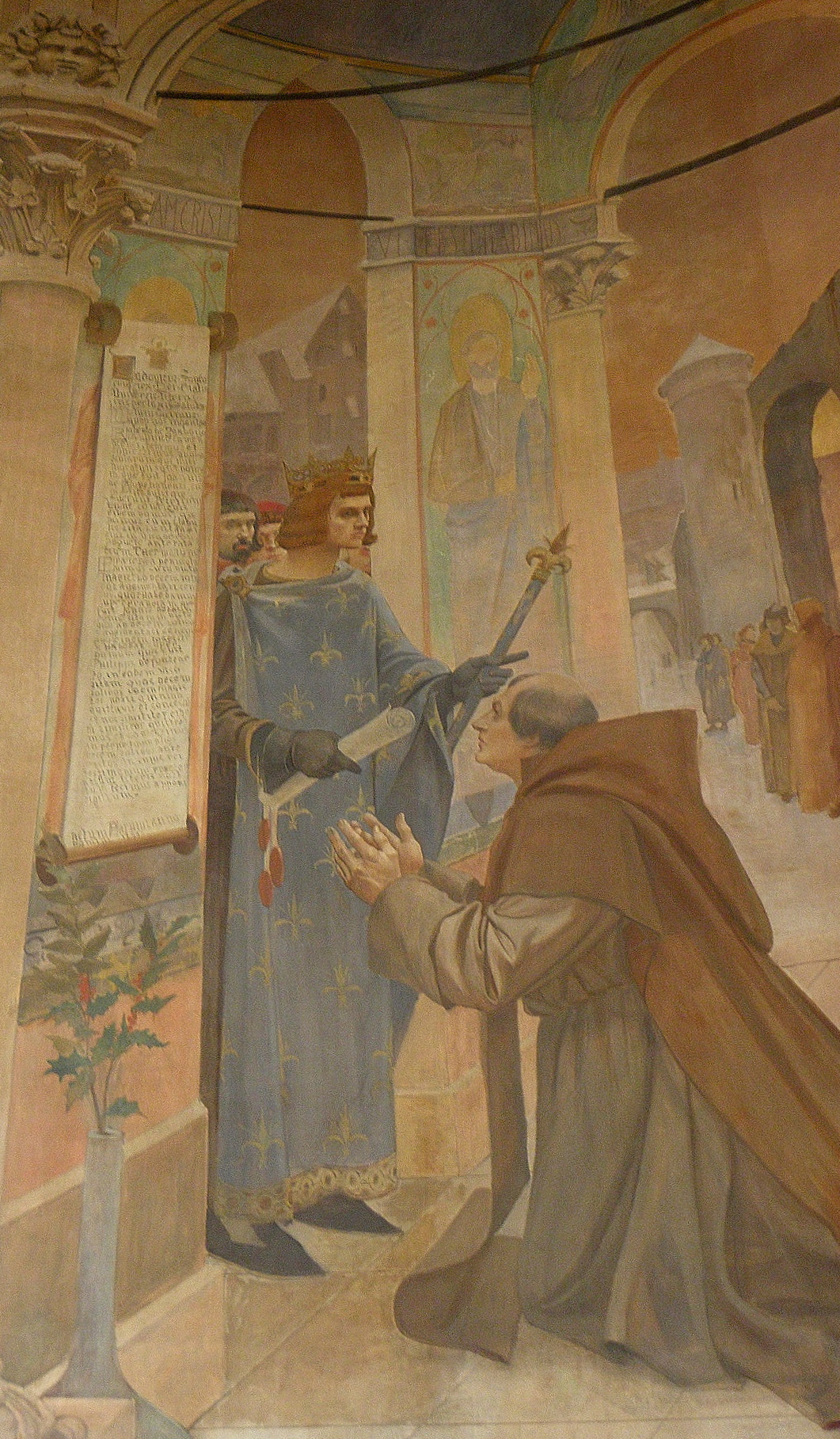
Robert de Sorbon and Louis IX

Geoffroy was Dean of the Church of St. Quentin en Vermandois (Picardy). The King of France was the Patron, and had the right of appointment of Canons. In 1263 he is attested as Chaplain of the Bishop of Paris, and he was also Canon of the Cathedral of Notre Dame de Paris. He became friends with Robert de Sorbon, a fellow Canon of Paris and founder of the Collège de Sorbonne, and on 29 September 1270 he was named heir of Robert de Sorbon in his Will. In November 1274, when he was Dean of the Cathedral of Paris, he in turn gave all the property he inherited from Robert de Sorbon to the Congregatio pauperum Magistrorum Parisius studentium in Theologica Facultate.

On 5 August 1279, he was Dean of Paris when he was appointed by Cardinal Simon de Brion, the Apostolic Legate, along with Gervais de Clinchamp, a Canon of Paris, to investigate a dispute at the University of Paris, between the Regent Masters in the Faculty of Arts on the one hand, and the Masters in Canon Law and Masters in Medicine on the other. The two appointees were to take testimony, employing canonical penalties for non-cooperation if necessary. They transmitted their findings under seal to the Cardinal Legate.

== Cardinalate ==
He was created cardinal-priest by Pope Martin IV (Simon de Brion) in the Consistory of 12 April 1281, and assigned the title of Santa Susanna.

On 30 April 1283, he was granted control over the Hospice of St. Andrew next to St. Maria Maggiore. In September 1283 he was appointed by Pope Martin as a member of an examination committee concerning the election and credentials of the Abbot-elect of St. Pietro de Montecornaro. It was in 1283 as well, that John Peckham, Archbishop of Canterbury, in his campaign against pluralism in benefices in general, and those of Tedisius de Camilla in particular, attempted to engage the influence of Cardinal Geoffrey at the Papal Court on his behalf. He was unsuccessful.

On 5 May 1284, he was one of the cardinals who subscribed to the Bull of Pope Martin IV, which granted the Kingdom of Aragon to Charles of Anjou, son of King Philip III of France. In 1285, he secured for his nephew, Nicolas de Bar, the diocese of Mâcon.

He died in 1287.

== Bibliography ==
- Alphonsus Ciaconius (ed. Augustinus Olduin), Vitae et res gestae pontificum Romanorum et S.R.E. cardinalium Tomus II (Rome 1677).
- Jean Roy, Nouvelle histoire des cardinaux françois Tome IV (Paris: Poincot 1787).
- Conradus Eubel, Hierarchia catholica medii aevi Tomus I, editio altera (Monasterii 1913).
- Agostino Paravicini Bagliani, Cardinali di curia e familiae cardinalizie 2 vols. (Padova: Antenore, 1972).
- Agostino Paravicini Bagliani, La vita quotidiana alla corte dei papi nel Duecento (Roma: Laterza, 1996).
