= Latino Malabranca Orsini =

Catholic cardinal

Servant of God Latino Malabranca Orsini OP
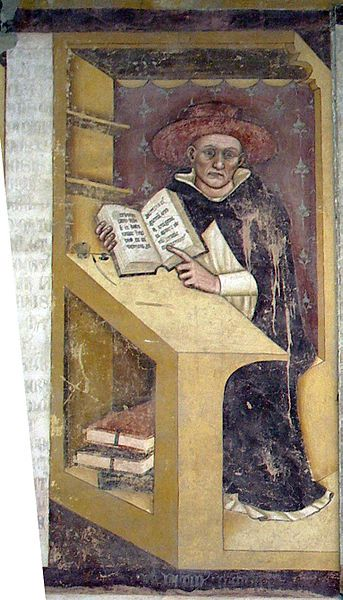
- Born: unknown Rome, Italy
- Died: 10 August 1294; Perugia, Italy

Latino Malabranca Orsini (died 10 August 1294, Perugia) was a Roman noble, an Italian cardinal of the Holy Roman Church, and nephew of Pope Nicholas III. Though revered as 'blessed' by the Order of Preachers, his cause for beatification is still within preliminary stages.

== Early life ==
Latino was son of Roman senator Angelo Malabranca and Mabilia Orsini, the daughter of Matteo Rosso Orsini 'Il Grande'. Mabilia was therefore sister of Giovanni Gaetano Orsini (Pope Nicholas III), Cardinal Giordano Orsini (died 1287), and eight other siblings. The Malabranca family were once said to be a branch of the Frangipani, but this hypothesis has been contradicted.

His uncle, Giovanni Gaetano Orsini, a Roman, Cardinal Deacon of S. Niccolo in Carcere, was created a cardinal by Pope Innocent IV (Fieschi) on Saturday, May 28, 1244.

== Education ==
Latinus studied at the University of Paris, and became Doctor in utroque iure. He obtained the title Magister in theology. He entered the Order of Preachers in his youth, at Santa Sabina, in the reign of Pope Alexander IV (1254-1261). It is not known where, when, or whether he became a priest before his elevation to Cardinal Bishop.

== The Dominican Friar ==
Frater Latino was appointed a lector at the studium conventuale at the convent at Santa Sabina on the Aventine in Rome. He subsequently became Prior of the Dominican convent of Santa Sabina. Thomas Aquinas was moderator of studies at Santa Sabina from 1265-1267, before his return to Paris. Fr. Latino served as definitor (elected delegate) to the Provincial Chapter in Orvieto (September 14, 1261). Under Pope Urban IV (1261-1264), he was Inquisitor General, a not uncommon assignment for a Dominican friar. He succeeded his uncle in the post of head of the Papal Inquisition in 1278, a position he occupied until his death in 1294.

== Papacy of Nicholas III (1277-1280) ==
Cardinal Giovanni Gaetano Orsini was elected pope at Viterbo on November 25, 1277. His predecessor, John XXI, had died suddenly when the roof of a room he was in fell in upon him. There had been only seven cardinals in Italy at the time (an eighth, Simon de Brion, was Legate in France), and the Conclave of 1277 was severely split into two groups of three, one composed of Giovanni Gaetano Orsini, Giacomo Savelli, and Matteo Rosso Orsini—all cardinal-deacons; the other of Ancher Pantaleoni, Goffredo d'Alatri, and Guillaume de Bray—all cardinal-priests. The sole cardinal-bishop, Bertrand de S. Martin, belonged to neither group. The regulations of the Constitution "Ubi Periculum" of Gregory X were not in effect, and therefore the discussions dragged on through the summer and fall of 1277. The major issue was whether Charles of Anjou would continue to be allowed to control the city of Rome and the Patrimony of St Peter. The Roman party finally succeeded in attracting two other votes, and Giovanni Gaetano Orsini was elected. This was a major setback for the Angevins.

On 12 March 1278 Fr. Latino Malabranca Orsini, OP, was created Cardinal-Bishop of Ostia e Velletri by his uncle, Nicholas III (1277-1280). He was one of ten created at the same time, with the object of diminishing the Angevin interest in the Sacred College, thereby giving the Papacy more independent counsel, and lessening the chances of indefinite control of the papacy by King Charles I. Five new cardinal-bishops were named, including Latino Malabranca, as well as two cardinal-priests and three cardinal-deacons. Five of the new cardinals were members of religious orders. Two were relatives of the new pope: Latino and the Pope's brother Giordano Orsini. One French appointee, Erhard de Lessines (Lesigny), son of Guillaume, Marshal of Champagne, died on July 18, 1278, of dysentery. Another, Robert Kilwardby, who had been Archbishop of Canterbury, died on September 12, 1279. The Franciscan Gerardo Cupalates, O.Min. also died in 1279.

The Pope, who was politically caught between the Emperor Rudolf I and King Charles I of Sicily, began to work to extricate himself and the Church from these two powerful forces, while at the same time keeping those two forces from confronting each other directly in a war which could ruin central Italy. First, he convinced the Emperor that the Romandiola (Romagna) and the Pentapolis (Cinque Terra) had once belonged to the Church, employing documents from the papal archives. He could not produce the alleged donation of Pipin III d'Heristal, but he did produce documents of Louis the Pious, Otto I, and Henry II. These were accepted as proof by the Emperor and his officials, without even considering that they might be forgeries, like the Donations of Constantine. At the same time, the Pope demanded that King Charles resign his position as Rector of Tuscany, which allowed him to dominate Rome from both north and south. To overcome the Emperor's reluctance to part with such rich territories as the Romandiola, the Pope offered him the Rectorship of Tuscany. On May 29, the Emperor Rudolf authorized his ambassador Gottfridus to agree to the terms, which he did in the treaty of June 30, 1278. Cardinal Latino's cousin, Bertoldus Orsini (son of Gentile Orsini), another papal nephew, was named Rector of the Romandiola and of the City of Bologna, and Cardinal Latino was named Papal Legate to the Romandiola. Another nephew, Orso Orsini, was named Rector of the Patrimony of S. Peter in Tuscany.

On August 2, 1278, as the time for election of new senators for Rome was drawing near, Pope Nicholas, who was in Viterbo, sent a letter to Cardinal Latino and to Cardinal Giacomo Colonna, Cardinal Deacon of S. Maria in Via Lata, instructing them to use their influence, without seeming to manipulate the election, to ensure the right outcome. The Pope most certainly did not want to give the impression that he himself wanted the office. Whatever else might happen, they must be discreet. King Charles had been granted the Senatorship of Rome for a period of ten years by Clement IV, and the end of the term was coming on September 16, 1278. On July 18, 1278, after consultation with the Cardinals, Nicholas had issued a bull, Fundamenta militantis, instituting the rule that emperors, kings, princes, marquises, dukes, counts, and barons were ineligible for the office of Senator of Rome, and others were eligible for one-year terms only. On August 30, King Charles instructed his Vicar in Rome, Jean de Fossames, to surrender all the fortresses and prisoners into the hands of the Romans on the appointed day—though not into the hands of the Pope. But, what Roman would dare to stand for election and survive the wrath of King Charles? The two cardinals were in fact working in the interest of Pope Nicholas himself. He was the only person who could be elected without a loss of face on the part of King Charles, and he was the only person who would resist the blandishments and threats of the king. But the people would never have the Pope as their Senator. Instead, they voted to invest Signor Giovanni Gaetano Orsini (not the Pope) with the powers and privileges of the Senatorship for the term of his life, inviting him to name a Senator for Rome. Signor Orsini (not the Pope) named his brother Matteo Rosso Orsini “di Montegiordano” as Senator for the coming year.

On the same day that King Charles was due to vacate the Senatorship, September 16, 1278, Cardinal Latino was ordered by Pope Nicholas to receive from the Royal Vicar in Tuscia all of the fortifications under his control, and that the Cardinal should hand them over to trusted agents.

But in the Fall of 1278, Bertoldus fell ill. Pope Nicholas named Cardinal Latino as Apostolic Legate and have him full powers to substitute for Bertoldus in all of his functions, including that of leading and provisioning the royal army of King Charles I of Sicily under the command of Guillaume d'Estendard. He immediately arranged peace in Florence and the Romandiola (Romagna) On November 7, Nicholas sent a letter to Cardinal Latino, commending his positive achievements in so short a time, even without the specific Instructions that the Pope had intended to send him. The Pope expressed his confidence that Cardinal Latino could carry on successfully without any additional instructions. On November 16, the Pope expressed his satisfaction that Guido de Montefeltro (the leader of the Ghibellines in the Romandiola) had been brought to obey his commands, but he conveyed as well the bad news that the Apostolic Camera (Treasury) was almost empty, and various expenses, including the payment of troops would have to be handled according to verbal instructions to be sent to Cardinal Latino through Giovanni Capucci, Canon of S. Maria Transtiberim.

On September 30, 1279, at Bologna, Cardinal Latino Malabranca issued a set of constitutions for his entire Legation, comprising six chapters: (1) on people who illegally occupy churches; (2) on visitation of monasteries; (3) against clerical concubines; (4) on granting and remitting penances; (5) on indulgences; (6) on the dress of women (this section being known from its first word, the Constitution Omnipotens). The sixth chapter addressed the subject of female apparel. Fra Salimbene tells us in his chronicle that Latino, in this campaign to pacify factional strife, issued a tough ordinance on female dress, banning long trains and requiring all women to veil their faces when they went out. This ordinance forbade priests giving absolution to those who violated the statute and did not repent. As is the case with all sumptuary legislation, Cardinal Latino's regulation of female attire was unpopular, complained about, and disregarded.
In the next pontificate, that of the French Martin IV (1281-1285), Cardinal Latino's successor as Legate in Lombardy, Cardinal Bernard de Languissel, Bishop of Porto, was so beset with protests and complaints that he had to modify and relax Cardinal Latino's Constitution Omnipotens. The legislation, however, remained on the books, until it was revoked by Pope Nicholas V in 1454.

In the Fall of 1279, Cardinal Latino had to attend to a serious revolt against the authority of the members of his own Order. In Parma, the Dominican inquisitors had tried to burn a woman whom they had convicted of being a Cathar. The people of Parma rose up against the Dominican inquisitors, who were forced to abandon the city and seek refuge in Reggio. Cardinal Latino, who was in Florence at the time, intervened by excommunicating the people of Parma. The absolution of the people of Parma was authorized by Martin IV in 1283, but the Dominicans still had not returned to Parma by November 22, 1286.

Malabranca was vicar and governor of Rome during the absence of the pope from July to November 1279, at least according to Dominican writers.

At some point during the reign of Nicholas III, Cardinal Latino was Auditor causarum in a case involving the Augustinian canons of the church at Wiborg in the Diocese of Ripen (Ribe) in Denmark.

On January 16, 1280, Cardinal Latino was instructed by Nicholas III to leave Florence, suspending negotiations for a peace for the present, and betake himself to Bologna, in order to bring about peace there. On March 2, 1280, Pope Nicholas wrote to Cardinal Latino that he had received Latino's messenger and report about the disturbed state of the city of Bologna and the Romagna, and that Latino was to continue his unremitting labors to find a resolution of the problems. Nicholas was sending him a Memoriale through Fr. Bartolomeo de S. Gemino, O.Min., who would explain verbally the Pope's intentions. A similar letter was sent to the Cardinal's cousin, Bertoldo Orsini, Rector of the Romandiola and of the City of Bologna. But Cardinal Latino was not yet in Bologna; he received another letter, sent on April 1, demanding his presence in Bologna. These problems in the Romandiola were, no doubt, the result of the transfer of sovereignty from the Emperor to the Pope, causing strife between Ghibellines and Guelfs.

Cardinal Malabranca's uncle, Pope Nicholas III, died on August 22, 1280, at his castle of Soriano, in the hills to the east of Viterbo. It is said that he suffered a sudden apoplectic stroke that left him speechless. The throne of Peter was vacant for six months.

== Latino's first Conclave, 1280-1281 ==
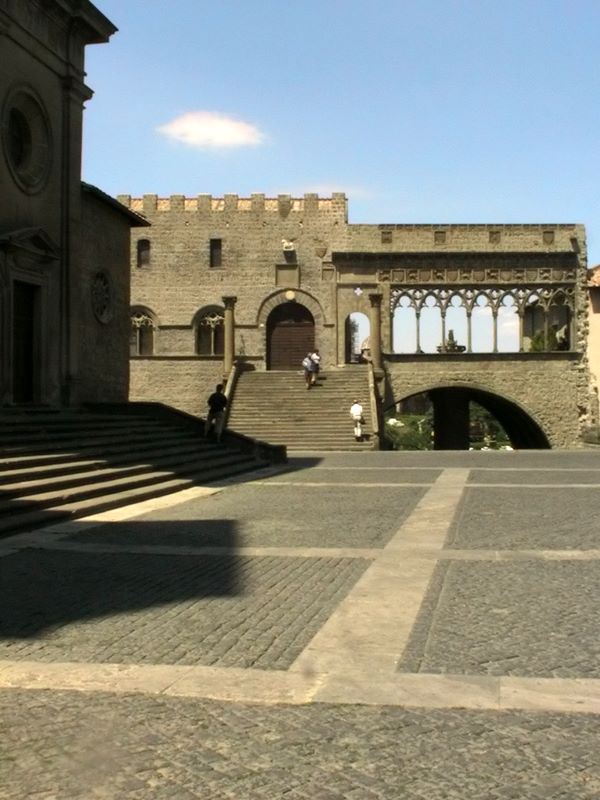
The Cathedral and Episcopal Palace, Viterbo

Since Pope Nicholas had died inside the diocese of Viterbo, Pope Gregory's rules, even though they were in suspension, required that the Cardinals should meet in Viterbo to elect his successor. The Roman Curia was already residing there. The Episcopal Palace in Viterbo, which had already hosted the long election of 1268-1271, that of September 1276, and that of 1277, was again the site of a conclave.

In Rome, as soon as the news of pope's death arrived, a coup-d-état against the Orsini government was led by Riccardo Annibaldi, whose forces were friendly to King Charles of Sicily. Unsuccessful, they were driven from the city. They headed for Viterbo, hoping to achieve the same coup where the Curia was in residence. This time they were successful. Riccardo Annibaldi roused the people against the papal Podestà of the city of Viterbo, Orso Orsini, and established a new regime favorable to King Charles of Sicily and hostile to the Orsini; thus, the Angevin party hosted the Conclave which began in September. Thirteen cardinals participated in the Conclave; and yet nine votes were necessary for a canonically valid election. The Orsini faction of the conclave, which included Cardinal Latino Malabranca and two other members of the Orsini family, forced a stalemate that lasted the entire year 1280. The Orsini faction had enough votes to block the Angevin candidate, and the Angevins had enough to prevent the election of an Orsini candidate.

The situation changed on February 2, 1281, the day of the Feast of the Purification of the Blessed Virgin Mary. The people of Viterbo, led by Riccardo Annibaldi and six of his captains (including Raynerius Gatto), entered the Conclave, caused serious injuries to several of the cardinals, and kidnapped two of the Orsini cardinals, Matteo Rosso Orsini, Cardinal Deacon of S. Maria in Portico, and Giordano Orsini, Cardinal Deacon of San Eustachio. Antoninus of Florence states that Cardinal Latino Malabranca Orsini was also abducted, but released shortly thereafter. Cardinal Giordano Orsini was released some three days later, having been made to agree to some stipulations (which, no doubt, compelled him to agree to vote for a candidate of King Charles). Cardinal Matteo Orsini was kept in prison until after the conclusion of the Conclave, thereby reducing the number of electors to twelve, and the number of votes needed to elect to eight. Even with the return of Cardinal Giordano, it took another two weeks to break the deadlock. On Saturday, February 22, 1281, the Cardinals finally elected Cardinal Simon de Brion, who took the name Martin IV. He had been the papal Legate in France for many years, and was the person principally responsible for having negotiating the bringing of Charles of Anjou to Italy in the first place, and making him King of Sicily.

== Papacy of Martin IV (1281-1285) ==
Cardinal Simon de Brion, Cardinal Priest of S. Cecilia, was elected Pope Martin IV at Viterbo on February 22, 1281.

Immediately upon his election, and even before his coronation, Martin IV sent Cardinals Latino Malabranca and Godefridus of Alatri to Rome, as 'angels of peace', to try to compose the differences among the various Roman factions; the People were to pay attention to their exhortations and warnings. In a separate letter to King Charles of Sicily he revealed his real purpose, to pave the way for his consecration and Coronation in Rome. The function of consecration would be carried out by Cardinal Malabranca, the Bishop of Ostia. The 'angels of peace' failed to arrange a peace, and therefore Martin IV was consecrated and crowned in Orvieto. He died in Perugia on March 28, 1285, never having set foot inside the city of Rome.

On March 10, 1281, King Charles was elected Senator of Rome for life, in violation of the Constitution of Nicholas III. On April 29, Pope Martin approved the election and conferred his powers upon him, authorizing him to appoint someone else as Senator. He notified the Roman people that he had transferred his Senatorship-for-life to King Charles.

On April 12, 1281, Pope Martin created seven new cardinals, four of whom were French. The lessening of Angevin influence in the Sacred College, which was a major policy decision of Nicholas III, had been deliberately reversed.

As to the Romandiola, which had been in the care of Cardinal Latino, the new Pope, on May 9, authorized Guillaume Durand, the Dean of Chartres, to spend up to 10,000 livres Tournois in France to raise troops for the purpose of pacifying the rebels of the Romandiola. The principal target of this action was Guido of Montefeltro, against whom an army was being put together under the banner of Johannes de Epa of Bologna, Rector of the entire army of the Church. On May 24, Johannes was named Rector of the Romandiola, Bologna, and the Brictinori. Clearly Guillaume and Johannes had replaced Cardinal Latino and his cousin Bertoldus Orsini in the administration of the Romandiola.

Cardinal Latino was present in Consistory (assistentibus...) at Orvieto on May 24, 1281, when Pope Martin issued an invitation to Rudolf King of the Romans to revise their treaty, given the fact that some of the conditions specified in the agreement made with Nicholas III had not been met. The impression is given that Latino and the rest of the cardinals were in agreement with Martin IV—which was surely not the case. But the new cardinals had changed the political balance, and Pope Martin had his way. In fact Martin was systematically reversing all of the policies on which Nicholas III had based his papacy.

Cardinal Latino, however, served as an examiner of bishops (to ensure that bishops were canonically elected, and suitable in learning and character for being a bishop) in 1284 in the matter of the election of the Archbishop of Nidrosia (Drontheim) in Norway, and in the election of Jean de Château-Villain as Bishop of Châlons-sur-Marne. He also served as Auditor causarum in the disputed election at the Priory of S. Maria de Boxgrave.

King Charles, who had long been involved with his barons over the operations of his administrative system, again met with serious trouble with the Sicilian Vespers, which began in Palermo on March 29, 1282, and resulted in the loss of the entire island of Sicily to Pedro of Aragon by the end of the year. Charles died at Foggia on January 7, 1285. Pope Martin died in Perugia on March 28, 1285, never having set foot inside the city of Rome. The throne of Peter was vacant for only four days.

== Papacy of Honorius IV (1285-1287) ==
Giacomo Savelli, a Roman, Cardinal Deacon of Santa Maria in Cosmedin, was elected pope on April 2, 1285, on the first ballot. He was immediately elected Senator for life by the Roman people.

On 20 May 1285 Cardinal Latino Malabranca conferred the episcopal consecration on the newly elected Pope Honorius IV; the consecration of a new pope as a bishop was the special privilege of the Bishop of Ostia.

On September 17, 1285, he subscribed the Bull "Justitia et Pax" of Pope Honorius IV, the Constitution for the good order of the Kingdom of Sicily. This document was intended to bring order out of the disorder left by King Charles I at his death. In 1285, Cardinal Latino was again examiner of bishops in the matter of Bishop Guillaume de Gardies of Utica (Uzès) in France. He carried out other examinations throughout the reign.

On February 17, 1286, Pope Honorius confirmed the election of Archbishop John le Romain of York, and authorized Cardinal Latino Malabranca to consecrate him in St. Peter's Basilica, and invest him with the pallium. On August 23, Cardinal Latino was authorized to consecrate Fr. Peter as the Latin Patriarch of Constantinople.

Honorius IV died on Holy Thursday, April 3, 1287, at his palace at Santa Sabina, and was buried in S. Peter's next to Nicholas III.

== Papacy of Nicholas IV (1288-1292) ==
Nicholas IV (Fr. Girolamo Masci, O.Min.) was elected on February 22, 1288, at the papal palace at Santa Sabina on the Aventine Hill.

On June 12, 1288, Pope Nicholas granted to Cardinal Latino Malabranca, de gratia speciali, all of the income which came to the Papacy from the city and territory of Segni for the term of his life.

On April 5, 1288, at the request of Cardinal Malabranca, Pope Nicholas IV granted an exemption from assessments owed to the Apostolic Camera to Paltomitono son of Theobald, a citizen of Viterbo, to his share of Castro Tessampano in the territory of Viterbo. On September 27, 1288, Cardinal Latino was given the mandate to correct and reform the Monastery of S. Angelo de Fontanellis near Todi, which belonged to the Vallombrosian monks. On February 15, 1290, he was ordered, employing civil assistance if necessary, to investigate the situation at the Benedictine Monastery of Montis Fani in the Diocese of Camerino, and ensure that no person illegally occupy any territory or property of the monastery, and, if there were such cases, to compel the restitution of the properties. On October 16, he was a member of the examination committee that approved the election of Bishop Jacobus of Segni, and on February 10, 1291, that of Archbishop Salimbene of Capua.

Malabranca became dean of the College of Cardinals after the death of Cardinal Bentivenga dei Bentivenghi on March 25 or 26, 1289. The position, which is not an office, and which was obtained strictly on the basis of seniority among the Cardinal Bishops, gave its holder the right to preside as prior Episcoporum at all meetings of Cardinals during a vacancy of the papal throne (Sede Vacante), as well as the right to be the first to nominate a candidate at a Conclave, and to cast the first vote. For many centuries, votes were cast publicly.

Pope Nicholas IV died in Rome on Holy Saturday, April 4, 1292, in the Patriarchal residence at the Liberian Basilica (Santa Maria Maggiore), in the fifth year of his reign. The Church would be without a pope for the next two years, three months, and two days.

== Conclave ==
Twelve cardinals attended the funeral, according to the Apostolic Subdeacon, Giacopo Caetani Stefaneschi, who was present at the events. There were six Romans, four Italians, and two French. They were divided into two opposing groups, one led by Matteo Rosso Orsini, which sought a new pope who would be compliant to the wishes of King Charles II of Sicily, the other by Giacopo Colonna. Cardinal Latino, as Ordine Pontificum primus (in the words of Giacopo Caetani Stefaneschi), undertook the expected task of summoning the Conclave. According to the rules, it would have opened on August 15 or 16, 1292, at S. Maria Maggiore, where Nicholas IV had died. But his efforts were unsuccessful. Some did assemble at S. Maria Maggiore, but the rest held back. Then he tried to assemble everyone at the papal palace at Santa Sabina, and then at Santa Maria sopra Minerva. The reason for his failure is not far to seek. There was a civil war going on in the streets and neighborhoods of Rome between the Orsini family and their adherents and the Colonna family and theirs. Each faction of the cardinals was unwilling to entrust its safety to the other faction, or to anyone else. There was also the heat and oppressive humidity of a Roman summer to contend with, and that always brought plague of some sort, especially malaria. Instead of coming together, the Cardinals began to disperse. Claiming illness, Cardinal Benedetto Caetani withdrew to his home town of Anagni, in the hills east of Rome. Cardinal Hugues de Billon and three other cardinals retreated to Reate in Tuscany, north of Rome. It was only in September, 1292, after the summer heat had dissipated, that Caetani, Matthew of Acquasparta, and Bianchi returned to the city. But still there was no conclave. It was time to elect new Senators for Rome for the year 1293, but civil disorders made an election impossible.

Anarchy prevailed until Easter of 1293, when an effort to achieve a truce by compromise brought Agapito Colonna and Orso Orsini to the Senatorial office. But then Orsini died, and perhaps Colonna as well. Meanwhile, the Cardinals had sought safety outside Rome again. Hugues Billon and Matthew of Acquasparta returned to Riеti ([ˈrjеːti]), and Benedetto Caetani sought refuge at Viterbo. Stefaneschi says that only three cardinals remained in the City. It was not until October that order was restored in Rome, and two neutral citizens, Petrus Stefaneschi (the Subdeacon's father) and Oddo di S. Eustachio, were elected Senators. But the cardinals were no longer in Rome. Many of them were assembled in Perugia, and they decided, after negotiations with the absent cardinals, that the Conclave would begin there on October 18, the Feast of S. Luke the Evangelist. October 18 arrived, and passed, and there was still no Conclave. During that winter, King Charles II of Naples, who was returning to Italy from Provence, visited Perugia and was received by the Cardinals. Two cardinal deacons (according to Stefaneschi) rode out to meet him, accompanied by the magistrates and people of the city, and his son, who had travelled up from Naples. The King spent several days there, and was entertained by the Cardinals. He gave a harangue to the cardinals, entreating them to proceed to an election of a pope, and he was answered in gentle terms (placido diffudit verba lepore) in a speech given by Cardinal Latino Malabranca. Ptolemy of Lucca, however, says that King Charles also had some hard talk with Cardinal Benedetto Caetani. King Charles and his son then proceed on their way to Naples.

On May 28, 1294, three of the cardinals who were at Perugia wrote a letter to the Council and Citizens of Viterbo, warning them not to attack the citizens of Orvieto in a dispute over a castle and property belonging to the Roman Church in the neighborhood of the Lake of Bolsena, under penalty of excommunication, interdict, and fine. The cardinals were Gerardo Bianchi, Cardinal Bishop of Sabina; Giovanni Boccamati, Bishop of Tusculum (Frascati); and Matteo d'Acquasparta, OFM, Bishop of Porto. It is curious that the letter is signed by the Cardinal Bishops, but that Cardinal Latino Malabranca, who was the senior Cardinal Bishop, does not sign.

After the departure of the King, and after the Feast of S. John the Baptist (June 24), according to Ptolemy of Lucca, Cardinal Latino Malabranca directed the attention of the Cardinals toward a certain hermit of the Benedictine Order, who was greatly attached to King Charles.

== Celestine V ==
On Monday, July 5, 1294, the College of Cardinals elected Pietro da Morrone as pope. The official declaration, issued on the same day, is signed by all eleven cardinals who were present, headed by Cardinal Latinus, Bishop of Ostia and Velletri. It relates the story of the election, which is different from Ptolemy's version in some important details. According to the Cardinals themselves, they were conducting discussions as usual, though in the absence of Cardinal Pietro Peregrosso, of Milan, Cardinal Priest of S. Marco, who was ill in hospitio suo ('in his own house'). At some point, without plan and unexpectedly, remarks were made about the Benedictine Brother Pietro da Morrone, and the attention of everyone, as though divinely inspired, was directed to a consideration of him. And they reached a unanimous decision, not without tears in their eyes. Cardinal Giovanni Boccamati, Bishop of Tusculum, Cardinal Hugues de Billon, OP, Cardinal Priest of Santa Sabina, and Cardinal Giacopo Colonna, Cardinal Deacon of S. Maria in Via Lata, were sent to Cardinal Pietro, and secured his consent to the election. Cardinal Latino Malabranca, Bishop of Ostia, then proclaimed Brother Peter's election, and all the Cardinals signified their assent.

The notice of Brother Peter's election, bearing the date of July 11, 1294, was carried to him by the Archbishop of Lyons (Beraldus de Got), the bishops of Orvieto (Francesco Monaldeschi) and Portuensis (Oporto? Julianus Mendez?), and two Apostolic notaries, who were accompanied by Cardinal Pietro Colonna, entirely on his own initiative. The official Nuntii had a good deal of trouble locating Peter in his mountain hermitage, for when he heard of their approach and their purpose, he is said to have fled farther into the wilderness. With a great deal of coaxing, from Charles Martel, son of King Charles, among many others, he was persuaded to come down as far as L'Aquila (which was part of King Charles' domains). The actual date of his acceptance of the Papal office is not recorded, though on August 17, he signed a document at Aquila with the note suscepti a nobis apostolatus officii anno 1.

== Death and Tomb ==
Cardinal Malabranca died on August 9, 1294, shortly after the election of Pope Celestine V, in which he played a notable part. His Last Will and Testament survives. He is venerated as 'blessed' by the Order of Preachers. He was buried in the Church of Santa Maria sopra Minerva in Rome; in 1630 the Minister General of the Dominicans transferred his remains and those of Cardinal Matteo Orsini from the Sacristy, where they had originally been placed, to new tombs near the High Altar, behind the statue of the Risen Christ.

== Musical Interests ==
"Dies iræ" (Day of Wrath), a 13th-century Latin hymn describing the day of judgment and used in the Roman liturgy as the sequence for the Requiem Mass for centuries, is sometimes attributed to Malabranca, who was a composer of ecclesiastical chants and offices.

== Bibliography ==
- Giovanni Villani, Ioannis Villani Florentini Historia Universalis (ed. Giovanni Battista Recanati) (in Ludovico Antonio Muratori (editor) Rerum Italicarum Scriptores (Milan 1728), Tomus 13).
- A. Touron, Histoire des hommes illustres de l' Ordre de Saint Dominique Tome premier (Paris 1743), pp. 542–559.
- August Potthast, Regesta pontificum Romanorum II (Berlin 1875).
- Lea, Henry Charles (1888). History of the Inquisition of the Middle Ages. Vol. 1. New York.
- F. Kaltenbrunner, (editor) (1889), Actenstücke zur Geschichte des Deutschen Reiches unter den Königen Rudolf I. und Albrecht I. (Wien 1889).
- Ferdinand Gregorovius (1906), History of Rome in the Middle Ages, Volume V. part 2, second edition, revised (London: George Bell, 1906).
- Richard Sternfeld, "Das Konklave von 1280 und die Wahl Martins IV. (1281)," Mitteilungen des Instituts für Österreichische Geschichtsforschung 21 (1910), pp. 1–53.
- Izbicki, Thomas M. (2009). "Failed Censures: Ecclesiastical Regulation of Women's Clothing in Late Medieval Italy". Medieval Clothing and Textiles. 5: 37–53. doi:10.5040/9781800108363.ch.003. ISBN 9781800108363.
- "The Cardinals of the Holy Roman Church created in the consistory of 12 March 1278". Archived from the original on 10 August 2011.
- Jean Dunbabin, Charles I of Anjou: Power, Kingship and State-Making in Thirteenth-Century Europe (New York-London: Routledge, 2014; reprint of Addison Wesley Longman, 1998), Chapters 10 and 11.

Catholic Church titles
Preceded by Pierre de Tarentaise	Cardinal-bishop of Ostia; 1278–1294	Succeeded by Hugh Aycelin
