= Gervais Jeancolet de Clinchamp =

Roman Catholic cardinal and diplomat

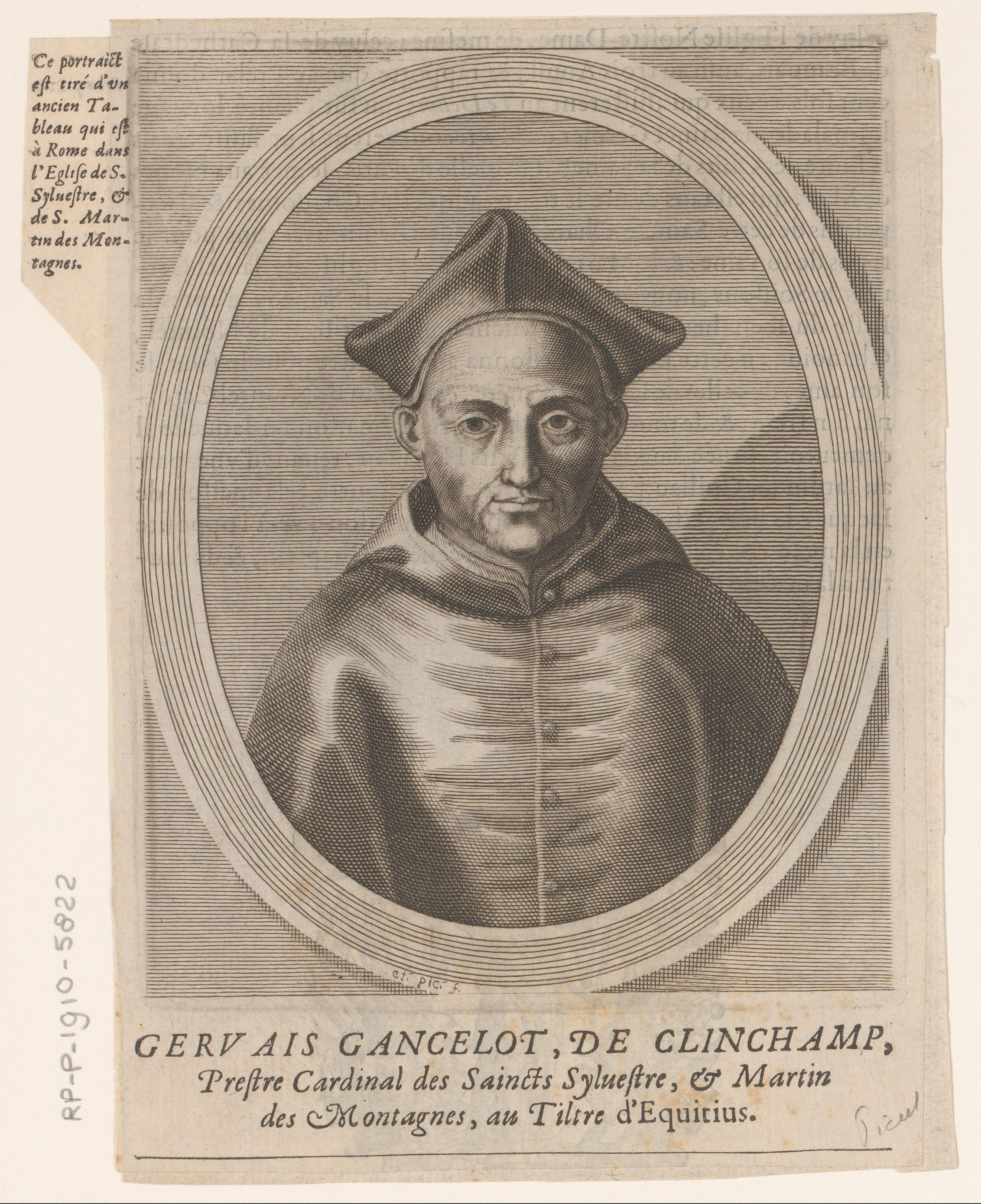
Gervais Jeancolet de Clinchamp

Gervasius Giançolet de Glincamp (in Latin: Gervasius de Clinio Campo) was born (perhaps around 1218) in the diocese of Mans, son of Gervais, great-grandson of Eudes, chevalier and seigneur de Groestel. He was a Roman Catholic cardinal and diplomat. He had a brother, Jean de Glincamp, who became Abbot of S. Remi in Reims (died April 1297). Another relative, a first-cousin, Robert de Glincamp, was bishop of Mans (1298–1309).

== Early career ==
Gervais Clinchamp's career in indicative of a person who was skilled in law, and his connections point toward Paris. The notion that he was Doctor of Theology is derived from the 15th century writer Paulus Cortesius, and it is claimed that Gervais wrote works in theology; but none of these alleged works survives, not even the titles or topics.

On 15 November 1277 Gervais de Clinchamp is attested as being a Canon of Paris, appointed by Cardinal Simon de Brion, the Papal Legate, to inquire into the jurisdiction of the Abbey of Saint-Corneille. He was Archdeacon of Le Mans. On 5 August 1279 he was appointed, along with Gaufridus (Geoffroy) de Barro, Dean of Paris, by Cardinal Simon de Brion, Apostolic Legate, to investigate a dispute at the University of Paris, between the Regent Masters in the Faculty of Arts on the one hand, and the Masters in Canon Law and Masters in Medicine on the other. The two appointees were to take testimony, employing canonical penalties for non-cooperation if necessary. They were to transmit their findings under seal to the Cardinal Legate.

== Cardinalate ==
Gervasius de Glincamp was created Cardinal Priest by the French Pope Martin IV (Simon de Brion) in the Consistory of 12 April 1281, along with six other prelates, including Geoffrey de Bar, his fellow investigator. He was assigned the titular church of S. Martino ai Monti. Since Martin IV never visited Rome even once during his pontificate, but kept the Roman Curia either in Viterbo or Orvieto, it is unlikely that Cardinal de Clinchamp saw the city of Rome either, until the accession of Honorius IV.

In November 1282 he was a member of a committee of cardinals who reviewed the election and the personal character of Reynaldus Malavolti, Bishop-elect of Siena. At the same time, he was a member of a committee that reviewed the election of a new abbot of Cryptaferrata, which they found to be uncanonical; but Pope Martin confirmed his election anyway.

In September 1283, Cardinal Gervais and Cardinal Girolamo Masci received a mandate from Pope Martin to intervene in a war between the people of Viterbo and the Orsini family over the ownership of the castello of Monte Coccozonis, which was held in feudal tenure from the Roman Church.

On 5 May 1284 he was one of the cardinals who signed the Bull of Pope Martin IV which granted the Kingdom of Aragon to Charles of Anjou, son of King Philip III of France.

In 1284 he was one of sixteen cardinals who received a distribution of income from the Treasury of the College of Cardinals, each cardinal receiving 156 florins of gold.

On 17 June 1285 he appears along with Pope Honorius IV as one of the executors of Pope Martin IV, and they turn over to the Prior and Chapter of the Church of S. Cecilia in Trastevere a silver icon which had been bequeathed by the late Pope, In August 1285 he was one of the Examiners of the bishop-elect of Tours, Olivier de Chaon, who died at the Roman Curia on 24 August while he was being confirmed.

In March 1286, Cardinal Gervais was appointed Auditor by Pope Honorius IV (Savelli) to examine the contested election of a bishop of Lescar in France.

In 1287, beginning on 22 July, the General Chapter of the Carmelites had its meeting in Montpellier under the leadership of Petrus de Aemiliano, their Prior General. One of the issues that they were debating was the use of a cloak as part of the habit, and the desire of some of the monks that the color of the habit and the cloak should be standardized; there was also a proposal that it should be dispensed with entirely. In anticipation of dissention and wishing to show proper respect to the Pope, they approached the Holy See, and the matter was explained to Pope Honorius (who died on 3 April 1287) by Cardinal Gervaisius de Glincamp. Permission was given by the Pope, through, Cardinal Gervasius, for them to deal with the matter in their General Chapter, and act in accordance with their constitutions. The Cardinal wrote them a letter to that effect from the Basilica XII Apostolorum on 9 February 1287. He wrote another letter on 3 May, reassuring them of Rome's position, as he had previously explained it, and that the death of the Pope did not change the instructions.

== Death and Burial ==
Pope Honorius IV (Savelli) died on Holy Thursday 3 April 1287. Cardinal Ancher Pantaleon, Cardinal Priest of Santa Prassede, in fact, predeceased Pope Honorius, dying on 1 November 1286. At the time of the Pope's death there were therefore only sixteen cardinals, but three of them were outside the Curia on diplomatic assignments. Cardinal Comes Casate, Cardinal Priest of SS. Marcellino e Pietro was dead on or by 8 April 1287. The Conclave began in mid-April at the papal palace next to Santa Sabina on the Aventine Hill in Rome. During the Sede Vacante in 1287 there also died Cardinal Geoffrey of Alatri, Giordano Orsini, and Geoffrey de Bar, Cardinal Priest of Santa Susanna. Cardinal Hugh of Evesham died on 28 July 1287.

Cardinal Gervais de Clinchamp died on 24 September 1287, during an intermission in the Conclave of 1287–1288, in which the cardinals had scattered due to a fear of 'the plague'. He was buried in his titular church of S. Martino ai Monti. Only one cardinal remained at the papal palace next to Santa Sabina on the Aventine, where the Conclave had begun. In February 1288, when the plague had abated and the Cardinals who had been ill had recovered, the Conclave resumed, with seven cardinals participating. Cardinal Girolamo Maschi, the cardinal who had stayed at his post, was elected on 22 February and chose the name Nicholas IV.

== Bibliography ==
- Jean Roy, Nouvelle histoire des cardinaux françois Tome IV (Paris: Poincot 1787).
- J. B. Sägmüller, Thätigkeit und Stellung der Kardinale bis Papst Bonifaz VIII. (Freiburg i.Br.: Herder 1896).
- Ferdinand Gregorovius, History of Rome in the Middle Ages, Volume V.2 second edition, revised (London: George Bell, 1906).
