= Pope Martin IV =

Head of the Catholic Church from 1281 to 1285

- Bishop of Rome
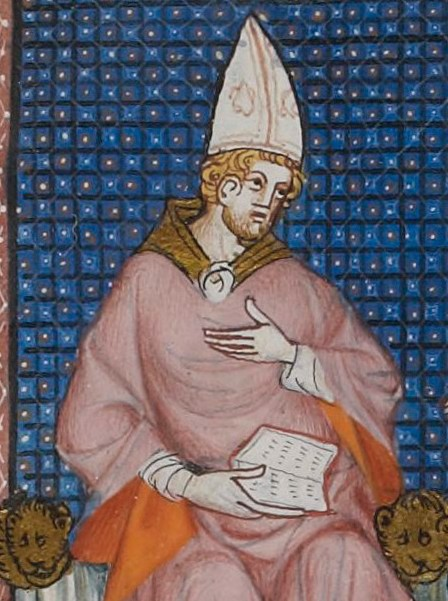
- 14th century Illumination of Pope Martin IV
- Church: Catholic Church
- Papacy began: 22 February 1281
- Papacy ended: 28 March 1285
- Predecessor: Nicholas III
- Successor: Honorius IV
- Previous post: Cardinal-Priest of Santa Cecilia (1261–1281)

Orders
- Consecration: 23 March 1281 by Latino Malabranca Orsini
- Created cardinal: 17 December 1261 by Urban IV

Personal details
- Born: Simon de Brion c. 1210 Andrezel, Brie, Kingdom of France
- Died: 6 March 1285 Perugia, Papal States
- Coat of arms

Pope Martin IV (Latin: Martinus IV; born Simon de Brion; c. 1210 – 28 March 1285), was the head of the Catholic Church and leader of the Papal States from 22 February 1281 until his death on 22 March 1285. He was the last French pope to hold his court in Rome before the papacy moved to Avignon.

Before his election, Simon de Brion was a prominent French cleric who served as chancellor to Louis IX of France and was made a cardinal by Pope Urban IV in 1261. His papacy was marked by close dependence on Charles of Anjou, whom he appointed Senator of Rome, and by significant political conflicts, including the excommunication of the Byzantine Emperor Michael VIII Palaiologos, which ended the fragile union between the Eastern Orthodox and Roman Catholic Churches established at the Second Council of Lyon in 1274. Martin IV also faced the Sicilian Vespers uprising and excommunicated Peter III of Aragon, declaring a crusade against him in an unsuccessful attempt to maintain Angevin control over Sicily.

Due to political instability and hostility in Rome and Orvieto, Martin IV spent much of his pontificate outside the city and died in Perugia in 1285.

== Early life ==
Simon de Brion, son of Jean, sieur de Brion, was born at the château of Meinpincien, Île-de-France, France, in the decade following 1210. He had a brother named Gilo, who was a knight in the Diocese of Sens. The seigneurial family of Brion, who took their name from Brion near Joigny, flourished in the Brie français. He spent time at the University of Paris, and is said to have then studied law at Padua and Bologna. Through papal favour he received a canonry at Saint-Quentin in 1238 and spent the period 1248–1259 as a canon of the cathedral chapter in Rouen, finally as archdeacon. At the same time he was appointed treasurer of the church of St. Martin in Tours by King Louis IX of France, an office he held until he was elected pope in 1281. In 1255–1259, King Louis IX founded the French royal convent at Longchamps for the Poor Clares (Minoresses); the King's sister Isabelle was the patroness (though she never entered the cloister herself), and Simon de Brion was the Guardian. In 1259, he was appointed to the council of the king, who made him keeper of the great seal, chancellor of France, one of the great officers in the household of the king. He became Chancellor of Louis IX of France (1260–1261).

== Cardinal Simon de Brion ==
On 17 December 1261, the new French Pope, Urban IV (Jacques Pantaléon), made Chancellor de Brion cardinal-priest, with the titulus of the church of St. Cecilia. This would have entailed Simon de Brion's residence in Rome, but the affairs of Pope Urban required that he send a representative of the highest level to France to deal personally with King Louis IX and his brother Charles of Anjou and Provence. Simon's previous experience at the French Court made him the perfect choice as Legate.

Cardinal Simon therefore returned to France as Papal Legate for Urban IV and also for his successor Pope Clement IV in 1264–1268. In 1264, on the eve of S. Bartholomew, he held a general synod at Paris. He was appointed again, by Pope Gregory X on 1 August 1274, and he served continuously in France until 1279. His first task was to raise support and money for a Crusade against Manfred, the Hohenstaufen candidate for the Imperial Crown. He immediately became deeply involved in the negotiations for papal support for the assumption of the crown of Sicily by Charles of Anjou. As Legate he presided over several synods on reform, and on the raising of funds for Pope Gregory's crusade. The most important of these was held at Bourges on 13 September 1276.

Signatures on papal bulls indicate that Cardinal Simon was back in Viterbo by 11 January 1268. In a letter of 14 or 15 January 1268, Pope Clement IV wrote to Cardinal Simon de Brion that he had heard that the Cardinal had fallen from his horse and in the accident had injured his leg. He also wrote that Conradin and Ludwig Duke of Bavaria were at Verona, and were pressing for Pavia. A general war was likely. Cardinal Simon's injury must not have been severe, since, on 3 April 1268, the Pope wrote to him with the request (not an order) that he undertake a legation to Germany (Teutonia), if he wished and if it were possible. The Pope needed a prudent and faithful man, who had clean hands and eyes wide open, who could stay centered on the business and let himself stray neither right nor left, who could preserve the Empire, keep the Apostolic See free from scandal, and the neighboring kingdoms free from danger. In vetting names, Simon seemed the most suitable.

Pope Clement IV (Guy Foulques) fell ill on the Feast of S. Cecilia (22 November), and died at Viterbo on 29 November 1268. He had governed the Church for three years, nine months, and twenty-four days. The See of Peter was vacant for two years and nine months. Cardinal Simon de Brion came from France to attend the Conclave, which took place in the Episcopal Palace, next to the Cathedral of S. Lorenzo in Viterbo. He was the senior cardinal-priest. Around Pentecost of 1270 (1 June), Cardinal Simon and Cardinal Riccardo Annibaldi of S. Angelo had to leave the Conclave and retire to their residences for the sake of their health. On 22 August 1270, he was one of the signatories to the letter of protest sent by the Cardinals to Raynerius Gatti, Captain of the City of Viterbo, to cease and desist from their harassment of the Cardinals and their suites. He was one of the cardinals who signed the electoral compact on September, 1270, to leave the election of a new pope to a committee of six, promising to accept the committee's decision. He was not, however, one of the six cardinals elected to the Compromise Committee that selected Archdeacon Teobaldo Visconti as pope on 1 September 1270. The newly elected pope was not present in Viterbo, but was serving on Crusade with King Edward I of England. He arrived in Italy on 1 January 1271, and travelled to Viterbo, where he arrived early in February. He accepted the election, and chose to be called Gregory X. He and the Curia travelled to Rome, arriving on 13 March. On 19 March he was ordained a priest, and on 27 March he was consecrated bishop, and then crowned by Cardinal Giovanni Gaetano Orsini.

== Three Conclaves of 1276 ==
Simon de Brion's appointment as Legate in France, made by Pope Gregory on 1 August 1274 continued throughout 1276. He was unable to be present for the Conclave of 1 January 1276, which elected Peter of Tarantaise as Pope Innocent V. Nor was he present for the Conclave of 2–11 July, which elected Ottobono Fieschi as Pope Adrian V. Nor was he present at the September Conclave, which, on 8 September, elected Peter Julian as Pope John XXI. In each case the election was completed before he could have been notified, and before he could have travelled from France to central Italy. This was one of the defects of Gregory X's regulations on the holding of a Conclave.

== Election of Nicholas III ==
Pope John XXI was in contact with Cardinal Simon. He had written to him on 3 March 1277, ordering him to speak with the king of France about matters connected with Alfonso of Castile. But the Pope died rather suddenly, after a reign of only eight months. He was still living in the Episcopal Palace in Viterbo, where Adrian V (Fieschi) had died and where he had been elected. The palace was still under construction, when suddenly the roof of one of the chambers collapsed. The Pope was in the room at the time, and he was severely injured. He died three (or six) days later, on 20 May 1277. Cardinal Simon de Brion was still in France when the Conclave began, but he was unable to predict that the Conclave would last until 25 November, and therefore he was not present. There were only seven cardinals in Viterbo, since neither Innocent V, nor Adrian V, nor John XXI had named any new cardinals. They argued on and on, trying to choose a pope. There were three cardinals who favored the Angevin Charles I and his designs. There were three who opposed him. Cardinal Bertrand de Saint Martin, Bishop of Sabina, the only surviving Cardinal Bishop, held a middle course, or perhaps one should say he saw too clearly to be willing to commit to either party. Finally, they chose Cardinal Giovanni Gaetani (Orsini), a native Roman, the Deacon of S. Nicola in Carcere and senior Deacon, and Archpriest of the Vatican Basilica.

Nicholas III immediately set out for Rome, where he was ordained a priest on 18 December 1277, and consecrated Bishop of Rome on 19 December. He was crowned on the Feast of S. Stephen, 26 December 1277 at the Vatican Basilica. One person, at least, was deeply unhappy about the outcome of this Conclave, King Charles I of Sicily. The new Orsini pope was an enemy of the Angevins, and Charles knew he would have nothing but trouble from Nicholas III.

A week after the election of Nicholas III, the new pope wrote to Simon, who was still Legate in France, urging him to effect a reconciliation between the King of France, Philip III, and the King of Leon and Castile, Alfonso the Wise. Since the King of Aragon, Peter III (who was married to Constance of Sicily) was involved in the struggle over Sicily with Charles I, this peace initiative threatened King Charles directly. On 22 April 1279, Pope Nicholas wrote to Cardinal Simon about King Philip. The Pope had issued a prohibition on tournaments, and King Philip and his barons were flagrantly violating the prohibition. Cardinal Simon was ordered to excommunicate the King of France.

To ensure that his victory against the Angevins would stand, Nicholas III decided to go forward with a much needed addition to the Sacred College of Cardinals. At his first opportunity, on 12 March 1278, he created nine cardinals. Five cardinal bishops were named: Latino Frangipani Malabranca, OP, of Rome (Nicholas III's nephew by his sister Mabilia); Erhard de Lessines (Lesigny), of Langres, son of Guillaume, Marshal of Champagne; Bentivenga de Bentivengis, O.Min., of Aquasparta; Robert Kilwardby, OP, Archbishop of Canterbury; and Ordoño (Ordeonio) Álvarez, Bishop of Braga. Two cardinal-priests were named: Gerardo Bianchi of Parma, and Girolamo Masci d' Ascoli, O.Min., of Picenum. He also appointed two cardinal-deacons: Giordano Orsini, brother of Pope Nicholas III, of Rome; and Giacomo Colonna of Rome. The effect of these creations was to seriously dilute the Angevin influence in the Sacred College, and to considerably increase the monastic element, especially the Franciscan one. It needs to be recalled that Nicholas III was the Governor, Corrector, and Protector of the Franciscans. The Roman influence was also strengthened. The inevitable consequence would be that the next pope too would not be a creature of Charles I of Sicily.

Eventually, though, by 19 October 1279, Pope Nicholas recalled Cardinal Simon de Brion.

== Conclave of 1280–1281 ==
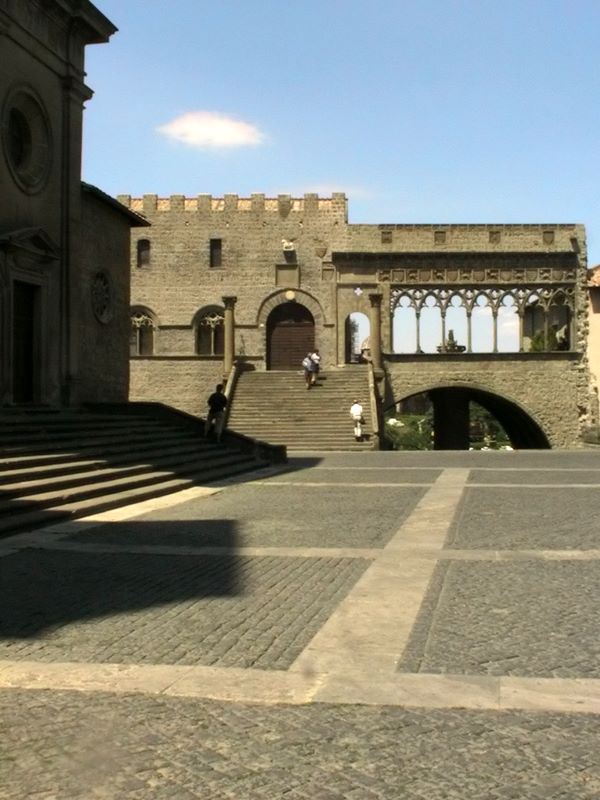
The Cathedral and Episcopal Palace, Viterbo

Pope Nicholas III (Giovanni Caetano Orsini) died at Castro Soriano in the diocese of Viterbo on 22 August 1280 of an apoplectic stroke which had left him without speech. A story was circulated nonetheless that he had been poisoned. At the time of his death on 22 August 1280, there were thirteen cardinals. This would be the fifth Conclave in five years. King Charles had taken the trouble to make friends with the Annibaldi faction, led by Riccardo Annibaldi, who were enemies of the Orsini and who had been driven out of Rome in street fighting following the death of Nicholas III. They had taken refuge in Viterbo, and now, by coincidence, they were present and entrenched and ready to make trouble on behalf of Charles I and themselves. Annibaldi led a coup in Viterbo, which drove out the governor of the city, Orso Orsini, the dead pope's nephew. The Angevins thereupon dominated the Conclave, in which the regulations of Gregory X were still in abeyance. But the Conclave still required a two-thirds vote to elect a pope, in according with the Constitution of Alexander III, which was still in effect. Neither the Orsini faction nor the French faction had sufficient votes to elect, but each had sufficient votes to block an election. The stalemate continued throughout the winter. On 2 February 1281, the Feast of the Purification of the Blessed Virgin Mary, a mob broke into the Episcopal palace, where the Conclave was in progress, and abducted two of the cardinals, Matteo Rosso Orsini and Giordano Orsini (the late pope's brother). Without their opposition, Simon de Brion was unanimously elected to the papacy on 22 February 1281, taking the name Martin IV,

For the third time in fifteen years Viterbo had hosted a papal conclave. And for the third time there were disorders which had threatened the validity of the election and the lives of the participants. Viterbo was placed under the ban of excommunication and of the interdict for the imprisonment of the cardinals. It was not possible, therefore, for the Coronation to take place in Viterbo. But Rome was not at all inclined to accept a hated Frenchman as Pope. Martin IV sent two cardinals, Latino Orsini and Goffredo da Alatri, to Rome with a letter, proposing that he be crowned in Rome on Quadragesima Sunday. The Romans positively refused to allow the Coronation to take place in Rome. But they did hold a public meeting, and elected Giovanni Caetani Orsini in his purely personal capacity as their Senator, and authorized him to appoint anyone he chose as his substitute. So Martin IV was crowned instead at Orvieto on 23 March 1281. He never visited Rome during his Pontificate. Instead he immediately sent his Vicar, Peter of Lavagna, to Rome. But on 30 April 1281, Pope Martin handed the senatorial power over to King Charles for the rest of his reign.

== Papacy ==
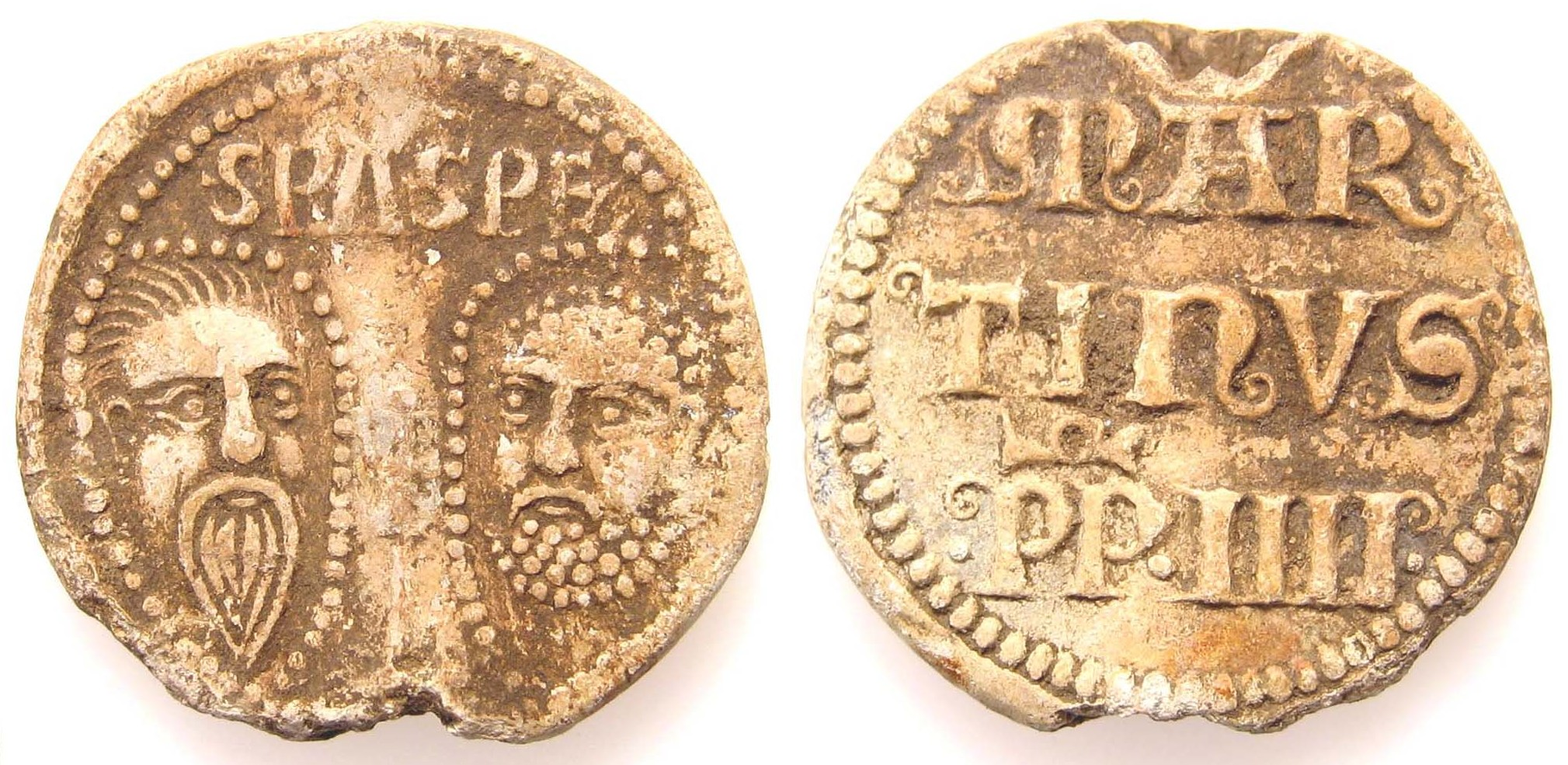
Papal bulla of Martin IV

Dependent on Charles of Anjou in nearly everything, the new Pope quickly appointed him to the position of Senator of Rome. At the insistence of Charles, Martin IV excommunicated the Eastern Roman Emperor Michael VIII Palaiologos on 10 April 1281 without warning nor provocation, since he stood in the way of Charles's plans to restore the Latin Empire, which had been established in the aftermath of the Fourth Crusade. He thus broke the tenuous union which had been reached between Constantinople and Rome at the Second Council of Lyons in 1274 and further compromise was rendered impossible.

In 1282, Charles lost control of the island of Sicily in the violent massacre known as the Sicilian Vespers. The Sicilians had elected Peter III of Aragon as their king and sought papal confirmation, in vain, though they were willing to reconfirm Sicily as a vassal state of the papacy. Martin IV used all the spiritual and material resources at his command against the Aragonese in order to preserve Sicily for the House of Anjou. He excommunicated Peter III, declared his kingdom of Aragon forfeit, and ordered a crusade against him, but it was all in vain.

Due to the hostility of Raynerius, the Captain of Orvieto, in the repeated struggles between Guelphs and Ghibellines, Pope Martin was unable to remain at Orvieto. He removed himself and the Papal Curia from Orvieto on 26 June 1284, and arrived in Perugia on 4 October. He died at Perugia on 28 March 1285.

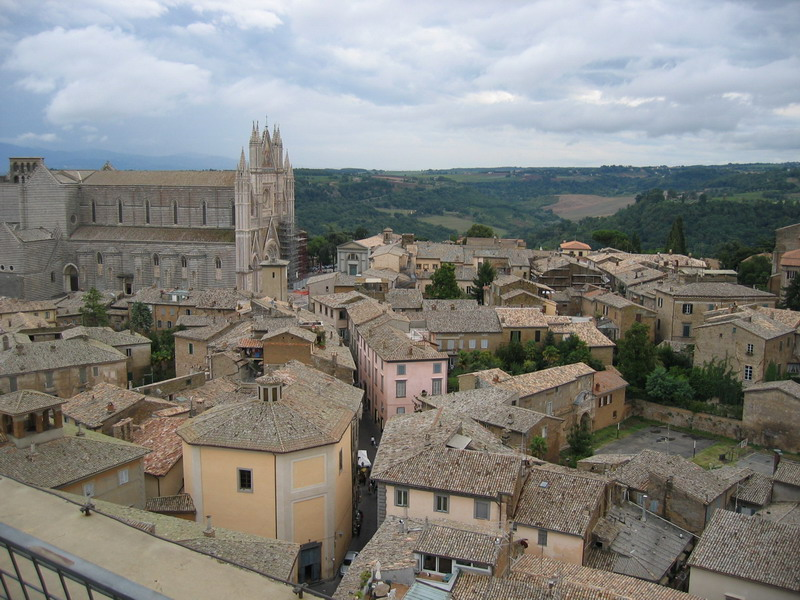
The cathedral and town of Orvieto

Following the example of Nicholas III, Pope Martin IV created new cardinals at his first opportunity, on the Quattuor Tempora of Lent, 12 April 1281. His new cardinals included: Bernardus de Languissello of Nîmes, the Archbishop of Arles since 1273; Hugh of Evesham, Canon of York and Archdeacon of Worcester; Gervasius de Glincamp of Mans, Archdeacon of Paris; Comes Giusianus, Conte de Casate, of Milan, Auditor of the Rota; Gaufridus (Geoffroy) de Barro or Barbeau, of Burgundy, Dean of the Cathedral of Paris; Johannes Chauleti (Cholet), of the village of Nointre in the diocese of Beauvais, a personal friend of Philip III, Philip IV, and Pope Martin IV; and Benedetto Gaetano of Anagni, who was elected Pope Boniface VIII on 24 December 1295. The French influence is strongly in evidence, and only Cardinal Gaetano came from the neighborhood of Rome.

== Death ==
Pope Martin IV celebrated a solemn Mass in the Cathedral of Perugia on Easter Sunday, 25 March 1285, which was also the Feast of the Annunciation. After his usual lunch with his chaplains, he was stricken with a sudden illness. On Easter Wednesday, 28 March, around the fifth hour of the night, he died. He was buried in the Cathedral of San Lorenzo in Perugia. He had reigned four years and one month. His successor was elected four days later, on 2 April.

In the Divine Comedy, Dante sees Martin IV in Purgatory, where the reader is reminded of the former pontiff's fondness for Lake Bolsena eels and Vernaccia wine.

== See also ==
- Cardinals created by Martin IV
- List of popes

== Bibliography ==
- Chouiller, Ernest, "Recherches sur la vie du pape Martin IV," Revue de Champagne et de Brie 4 (1878) 15–30.
- Picherit, Gilles, Documents pour l'histoire de Simon de Brion, pape Martin II dit IV., 1215–1285 (Les Herbiers: chez l'Auteur 1995).
- Cerrini, Simonetta, "Martino IV," Enciclopedia dei papi (Roma 2000), I, 446–449.
- Catholic Encyclopedia "Pope Martin IV"
- Miranda, Salvador. "Consistories for the creation of Cardinals 13th Century (1198–1303): Martin IV (1281–1285) – April 12, 1281". The Cardinals of the Holy Roman Church. Florida International University. OCLC 53276621.

Catholic Church titles
Preceded by Nicholas III	Pope; 22 February 1281 – 28 March 1285	Succeeded by Honorius IV
