= Pope Honorius IV =

Head of the Catholic Church from 1285 to 1287

- Bishop of Rome
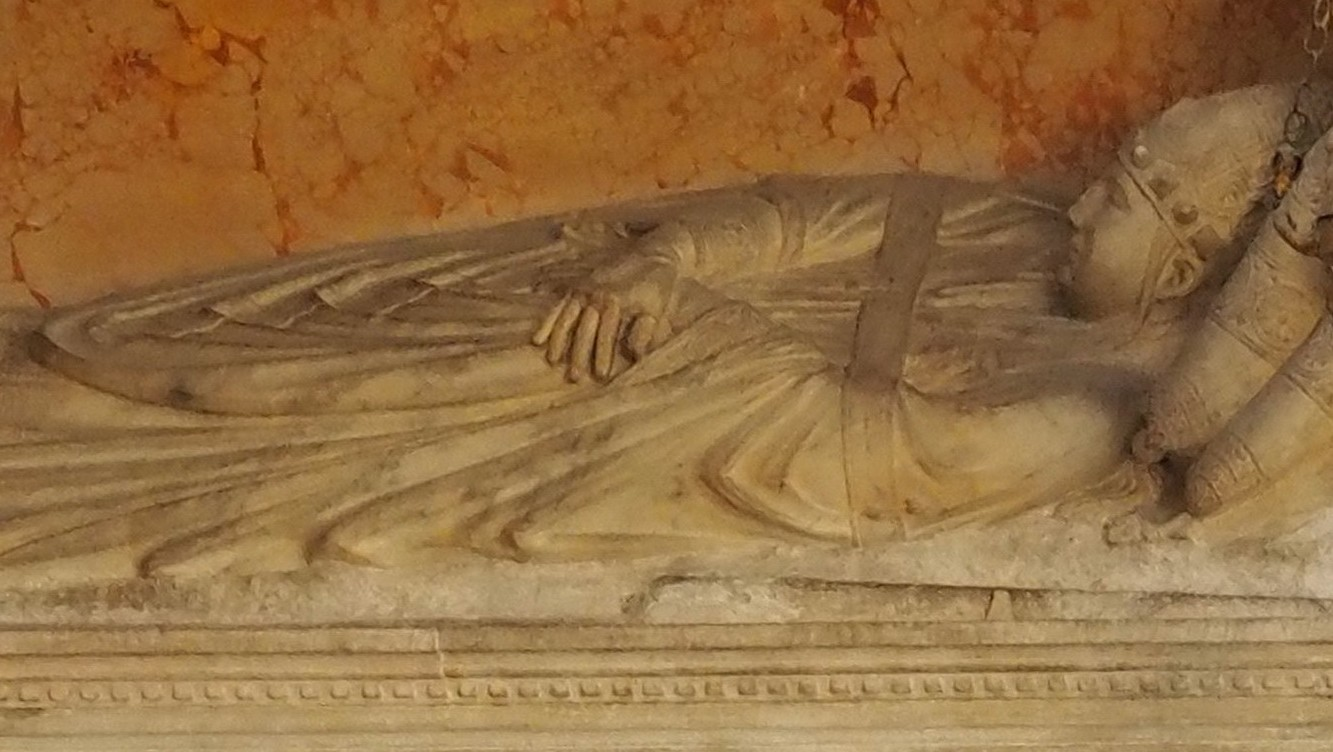
- Effigy on Honorius' tomb
- Church: Catholic Church
- Papacy began: 2 April 1285
- Papacy ended: 3 April 1287
- Predecessor: Martin IV
- Successor: Nicholas IV
- Previous post: Cardinal-Deacon of Santa Maria in Cosmedin (1261–1285)

Orders
- Consecration: 20 May 1285 by Latino Malabranca Orsini
- Created cardinal: 17 December 1261 by Urban IV

Personal details
- Born: Giacomo Savelli c. 1210 Rome, Papal States
- Died: 3 April 1287 (aged 76–77) Rome, Papal States
- Coat of arms

Pope Honorius IV (born Giacomo Savelli; c. 1210 — 3 April 1287) was head of the Catholic Church and ruler of the Papal States from 2 April 1285 to his death on 3 April 1287. His election followed the death of Pope Martin IV and was notable for its speed; he was chosen unanimously on the first ballot. Honorius IV's papacy occurred during a tumultuous period marked by political strife and conflict in Sicily, where he sought to navigate complex relationships with various rulers while maintaining papal authority. During his pontificate he continued to pursue the pro-French political policy of his predecessor. He is the most recent pope to take the pontifical name "Honorius" upon election, after his granduncle Pope Honorius III.

== Early life and education ==
Giacomo Savelli was born in Rome into the rich and influential Savelli family. His father, Luca Savelli, was a senator of Rome who died in 1266. His mother Joanna belonged to the Aldobrandeschi family.

Savelli studied at the University of Paris, and held a prebend and a canonry at the cathedral of Châlons-sur-Marne. Later he obtained the benefice of rector at the church of Barton Mills in Suffolk, England, although he never visited the country.

== Career ==
In 1261, he was created Cardinal Deacon of Santa Maria in Cosmedin by Pope Urban IV, who also appointed him papal prefect in Tuscany and captain of the papal army. Cardinal Savelli pursued a diplomatic career. Pope Clement IV sent him and three other cardinals to invest Charles of Anjou as King of Sicily at Rome on 28 July 1265. After the long deadlocked vacancy in the papal seen after the death of Clement IV, when the see of Rome was vacant for three years, he was one of the six cardinals who finally elected Pope Gregory X "by compromise" (a technical procedure) on 1 September 1271, in a conclave held at Viterbo because conditions in Rome were too turbulent.

In 1274, he accompanied Gregory X to the Council of Lyon, where it was established that only four mendicant orders were to be tolerated: Dominicans, Franciscans, Augustinians and Carmelites. In July 1276, he was one of the three cardinals whom Pope Adrian V sent to Viterbo with instructions to treat with the German King, Rudolf I of Habsburg, concerning his imperial coronation at Rome and his future relations towards Charles of Anjou, whom papal policy supported. The death of Adrian V in the following month rendered the negotiations with Rudolf fruitless.

Savelli became Protodeacon of the Sacred College in November 1277 and as such, he crowned Popes Nicholas III on 26 December 1277 and Martin IV on 23 March 1281.

According to John Julius Norwich, he was the last pope to be married before ordination.

== Election as pope ==
When Martin IV died on 28 March 1285, at Perugia, Cardinal Savelli was unanimously elected Pope on 2 April, on the first ballot, and took the name of Honorius IV. He remained at Perugia throughout April, but, once negotiations were completed, he travelled to Rome and took up residence in the family palace next to Santa Sabina on the Aventine Hill. He was ordained a priest by Cardinal Latino Malabranca Orsini on 19 May, and was consecrated a bishop and crowned pope on Trinity Sunday, 20 May in St. Peter's Basilica. Honorius IV was already advanced in age and so severely affected with gout (or arthritis) that he could neither stand nor walk. When saying Mass, he was obliged to sit in a specially constructed chair and at the elevation of the host, his hands had to be raised by a mechanical contrivance.

== Papacy ==
=== Sicilian Conflict ===
Sicilian affairs required immediate attention from the new pope. Previously, under Martin IV, the Sicilians had rejected the rule of Charles of Anjou, taking Peter III of Aragon as their king without the consent and approval of the Pope.

The massacre of 31 March 1282 known as the Sicilian Vespers had precluded any reconciliation. Martin IV put Sicily and Peter III under an interdict, deprived Peter III of the Crown of Aragon, and gave it to Charles of Valois, the younger of the sons of King Philip III of France, whom he assisted in his attempts to recover Sicily by force of arms. The Sicilians not only repulsed the attacks of the combined French and Papal forces, but also captured the Angevin heir, Charles of Salerno. On 6 January 1285, Charles of Anjou died, leaving his captive son Charles as his natural successor. Honorius IV, more peaceably inclined than Martin IV, did not renounce the Church's support of the House of Anjou, nor did he set aside the severe ecclesiastical punishments imposed upon Sicily.

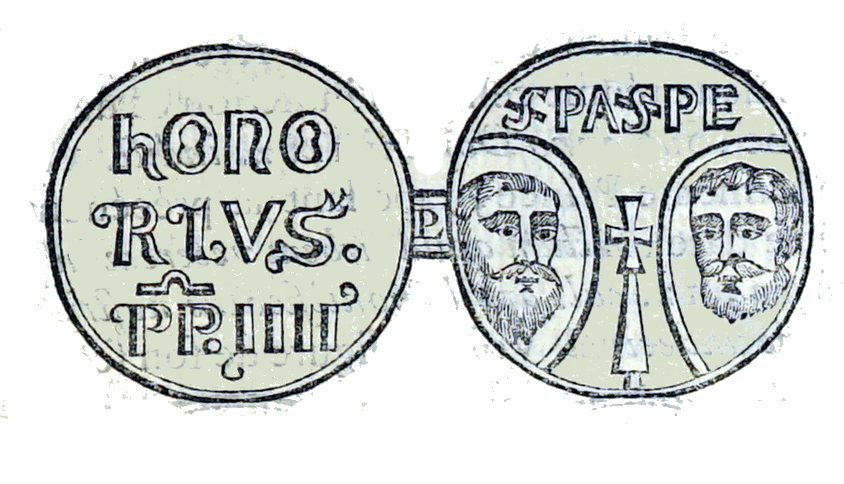
Bulla of Honorius IV

Honorius did not approve of the tyrannical government the Sicilians had been subject to under Charles of Anjou. This is evident from legislation embodied in his constitution of 17 September 1285 (Constitutio super ordinatione regni Siciliae), in which he stated that no government can prosper that is not founded on justice and peace. He passed forty-five ordinances intended chiefly to protect the people of Sicily against their king and his officials.

The death of Peter III on 11 November 1285 changed the Sicilian situation in that his kingdoms were divided between his two oldest sons: Alfonso III of Aragon, who received the crown of Aragon, and James II of Aragon, who succeeded as King of Sicily. Honorius IV acknowledged neither the one nor the other: on 11 April 1286, he solemnly excommunicated King James II of Sicily and the bishops who had taken part in his coronation at Palermo on 2 February. Neither the king nor the bishops concerned themselves about the excommunication. The king even sent a hostile fleet to the Roman coast and destroyed the city of Astura by fire.

Charles of Salerno, the Angevin pretender, who was still held captive by the Sicilians, finally grew tired of his long captivity and signed a contract on 27 February 1287 in which he renounced his claims to the kingdom of Sicily in favour of James II of Aragon and his heirs. Honorius IV, however, declared the contract invalid and forbade all similar agreements for the future.

While Honorius IV was inexorable in the stand he had taken towards Sicily, his relations towards Alfonso III of Aragon became less hostile. Through the efforts of King Edward I of England, negotiations for peace were begun by Honorius IV and King Alfonso III. The Pope, however, did not live long enough to complete these negotiations, which finally resulted in a peaceful settlement of the Aragonese as well as the Sicilian question in 1302 under Pope Boniface VIII.

=== Rome ===
Rome and the Papal States enjoyed a period of tranquillity during the reign of Honorius IV, the like of which they had not enjoyed for many years. He had the satisfaction of reducing the most powerful and obstinate enemy of papal authority, Count Guy of Montefeltro, who for many years had successfully resisted the papal troops. The authority of the pope was now recognized throughout the Papal States, which then comprised the Ravenna, the March of Ancona, the Duchy of Spoleto, the County of Bertinoro, the Mathildian lands, and the Pentapolis, i.e., the cities of Rimini, Pesaro, Fano, Senigallia, and Ancona. Honorius IV was the first pope to employ the great family banking houses of central and northern Italy for the collection of papal dues.

The Romans were greatly elated at the election of Honorius IV, for he was a citizen of Rome and a brother of Pandulf, a senator of Rome. The continuous disturbances in Rome during the pontificate of Martin IV had not allowed that pope to live in Rome, but now the Romans cordially invited Honorius IV to make Rome his permanent residence. During the first few months of his pontificate he lived in the Vatican, but in the autumn of 1285 he removed to the magnificent palace he had just erected on the Aventine.

=== Relations with the Holy Roman Empire ===
In his relations with the Holy Roman Empire, where no more danger was to be apprehended since the fall of the Hohenstaufen dynasty, Martin followed the moderate course taken by Gregory X. Rudolf I of Germany sent Bishop Henry of Basel to Rome to request coronation. Honorius IV appointed the envoy Archbishop of Mainz, fixed a date for the coronation, and sent Cardinal John of Tusculum to Germany to assist Rudolf I's cause. But general opposition showed itself to the papal interference; a council at Würzburg (16–18 March 1287) protested energetically, and Rudolf I had to protect the legate from personal violence, so that both his plans and the Pope's failed.

=== Other acts ===
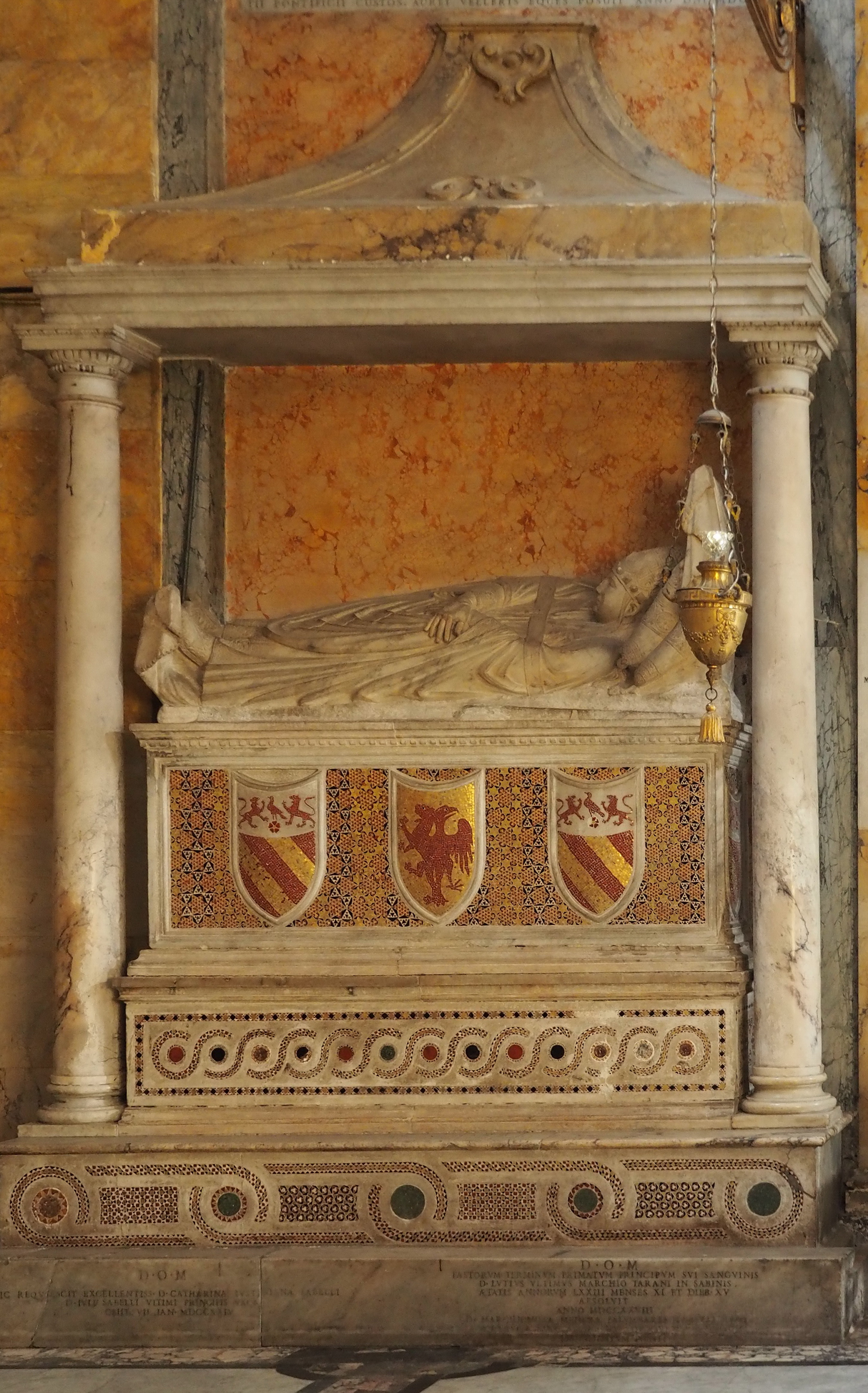
Honorius IV's tomb at Santa Maria in Aracoeli

Honorius IV inherited plans for another crusade, but confined himself to collecting the tithes imposed by the Council of Lyon, arranging with the great banking houses of Florence, Siena, and Pistoia to act as his agents.

The two largest religious orders received many new privileges from Honorius IV, documented in his Regesta. He often appointed them to special missions and to bishoprics, and gave them exclusive charge of the Inquisition.

He also approved the privileges of the Carmelites and the Augustinian hermits and permitted the former to exchange their striped habit for a white one. He was especially devoted to the order founded by William X of Aquitaine and added numerous privileges to those they had already received from Alexander IV and Urban IV. Besides turning over to them some deserted Benedictine monasteries, he presented them with the monastery of St. Paul at Albano, which he himself had founded and richly endowed when he was still cardinal.

Salimbene, the chronicler of Parma, asserted that Honorius IV was a foe to the religious orders. This may reflect the fact that he opposed the Apostolic Brethren, an order embracing evangelical poverty that had been started by Gerard Segarelli at Parma in 1260. On 11 March 1286, he issued a bull condemning them as heretics.

At the University of Paris, he advocated the establishment of chairs for Eastern languages to teach these languages to those who would labour for the conversion of the Muslims and the reunion of the schismatic churches in the East.

He raised only one man to be cardinal, his cousin Giovanni Boccamazza, archbishop of Monreale, on 22 December 1285.

The tomb of Pope Honorius IV is in the church of Santa Maria in Aracoeli in Rome.

=== Contacts with the Mongols ===
The Mongol ruler Arghun sent an embassy and a letter to Pope Honorius IV in 1285, a Latin translation of which is preserved in the Vatican. It mentions the links to Christianity of Arghun's family, and proposes a combined military conquest of Muslim lands:

"As the land of the Muslims, that is, Syria and Egypt, is placed between us and you, we will encircle and strangle ("estrengebimus") it. We will send our messengers to ask you to send an army to Egypt, so that us on one side, and you on the other, we can, with good warriors, take it over. Let us know through secure messengers when you would like this to happen. We will chase the Saracens, with the help of the Lord, the Pope, and the Great Khan."

— Extract from the 1285 letter from Arghun to Honorius IV, Vatican Archives

Honorius IV was hardly capable of acting on this invasion and could not muster the military support necessary to achieve this plan.

== See also ==
- Cardinals created by Honorius IV

== Bibliography ==
- F. Gregorovius, History of Rome in the Middle Ages, Volume V.2 second edition, revised (London: George Bell, 1906) 491–515.
- Grousset, René (1935). Histoire des Croisades III, 1188-1291 (in French). Editions Perrin. ISBN 978-2-262-02569-4.
- Venditelli, Marco, "Onorio IV," Enciclopedia dei papi (Roma 2000) I, pp. 449–455.

Catholic Church titles
Preceded by Martin IV	Pope; 2 April 1285 – 3 April 1287	Succeeded by Nicholas IV
