= Radji =

Radji is a surname. Notable people with the surname include:

- Mohammed Mostajo-Radji (born 1989), Bolivian scientist and diplomat
- Nafissath Radji (born 2002), Beninese swimmer
- Parviz C. Radji (1936–2014), Iranian diplomat

== See also ==
- Raji (disambiguation)
- Radzi (name)
- Raggi
