= Raggi =

Raggi is a surname and may refer to:

- Andrea Raggi (born 1984), Italian footballer
- Antonio Raggi (1624–1686), Italian sculptor
- Camilla Salvago Raggi (born 1924), Italian poet and novelist
- Giuseppe Salvago Raggi (1866-1946), Italian diplomat
- Gonippo Raggi (1875–1959), Italian artists
- Jorge Humberto Raggi (born 1938), retired Portuguese footballer
- Lorenzo Raggi (1615–1687), Italian Catholic Cardinal
- Maria Raggi (1552–1600), Catholic nun of Genoese descent from island of Chios
- Mario Raggi (1821–1907), Italian sculptor
- Ottaviano Raggi (1592–1643), Italian Catholic Cardinal
- Pietro Paolo Raggi (1646–1724), Italian painter
- Reena Raggi (born 1951), US federal judge
- Virginia Raggi (born 1978), mayor of Rome

== See also ==
- Raggio
- Memorial to Maria Raggi
- Raggi Bjarna (born 1934), Icelandic singer
- Ragnar Þórhallsson, Icelandic musician, male singer for Of Monsters and Men
