= Pietro Urbano =

Italian painter

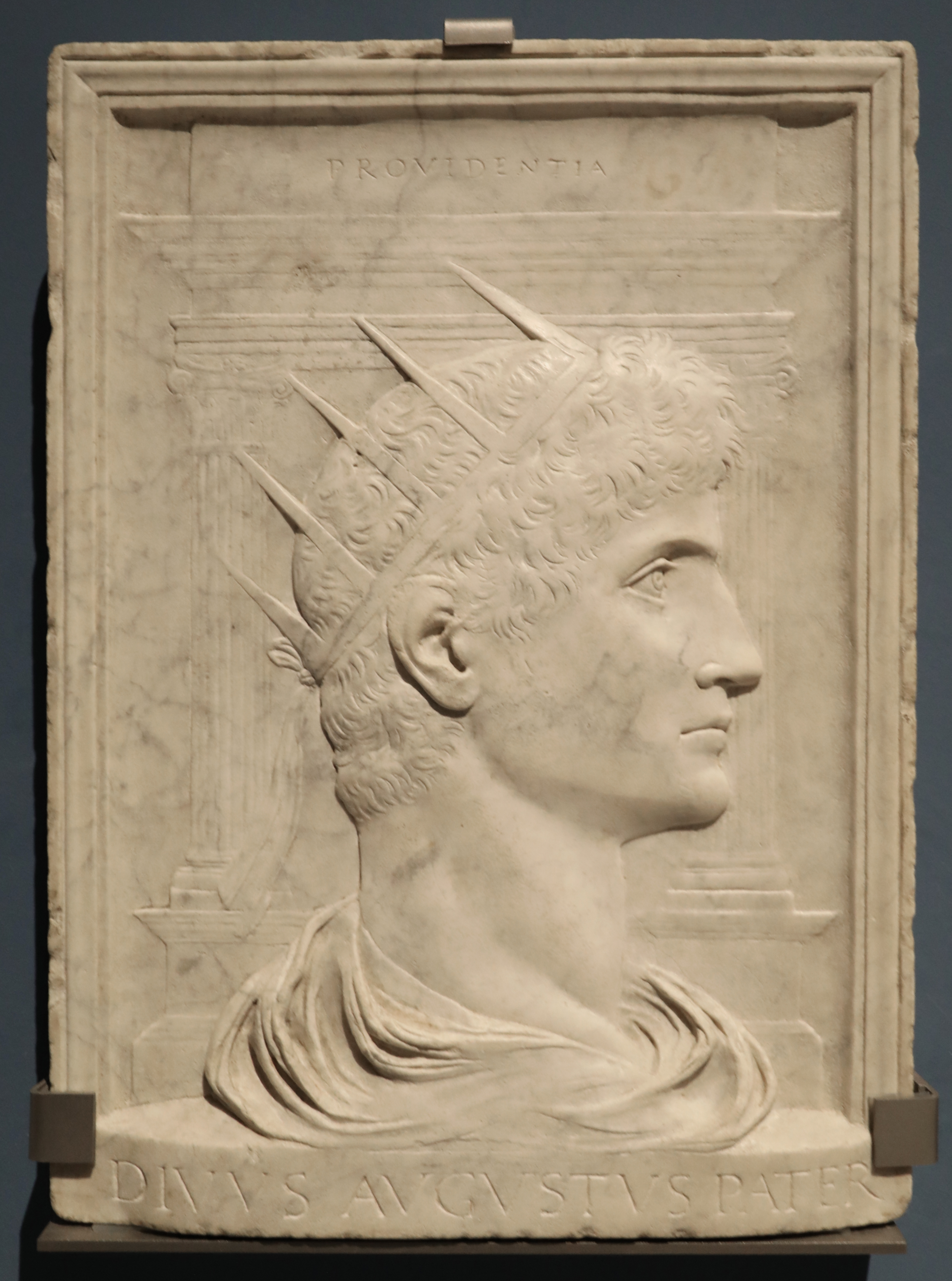
Augustus, 1515-1525 circa (Barcelona, MNAC)

Pietro Urbano was an Italian artist of the Renaissance period. He was born in Pistoia, and was a pupil of Michelangelo as a sculptor. He was dismissed from Michelangelo's service for allegedly defacing the master's Risen Christ, rather than completing the finer details onsite at the church of Santa Maria sopra Minerva, as he had been charged. According to Michelangelo's confidant Sebastiano del Piombo, "all he has worked on is completely disfigured." Urbano subsequently absconded with pilfered jewelry and clothing, fleeing to Rome with the stolen goods in order to gamble and engage prostitutes.

In the Roman Basilica of Santa Maria in Ara Coeli, he sculpted the funeral monument of Cecchino Bracci, another pupil of Michelangelo, dead at the age of sixteen.

== Bibliography ==
- Bryan, Michael (1889). Walter Armstrong; Robert Edmund Graves (eds.). Dictionary of Painters and Engravers, Biographical and Critical. Vol. II L-Z. London: George Bell and Sons. p. 600.
