= Radzi (name) =

Radzi is a Malay name. There typically are no surnames in Malay names. For example, in the name Mohd Badhri Mohd Radzi, the last part "Radzi" is not a surname, as could be expected by European customs. Rather, "Mohd Radzi" is a patronymic, i.e., the name of the father of the person.

Notable people with the name which include "Radzi" include:

- Mohd Radzi Sheikh Ahmad
- Mohd Badhri Mohd Radzi
- Radzi Jidin
- Jamaluddin Mohd Radzi
- Radzi Chinyanganya, television presenter
- Nolee Ashilin Mohammed Radzi
- Ras Adiba Radzi (Ras Adiba binti Mohd Radzi)
- Radzi Mohd Hussin

== See also ==
- Radži, Roma Lithuanian pop singer
- Raji (disambiguation)
- Radji
