= Portrait of Caracalla =

Sculpture of Caracalla

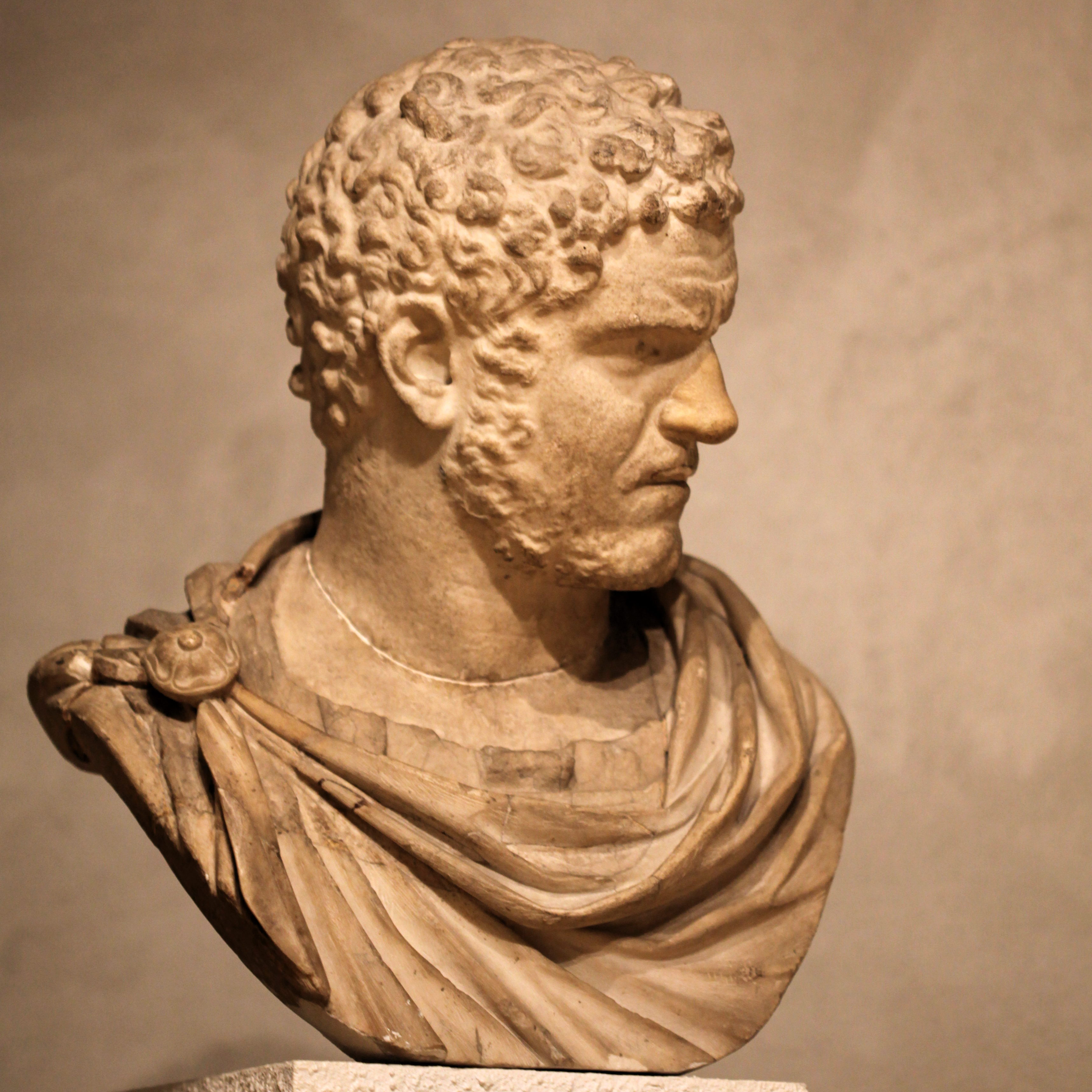
- Version in the Louvre, lent to Lyons
- Year: 212
- Medium: Marble
- Subject: Caracalla
- Dimensions: 51 cm (20 in)
- Location: Vatican Museums

The Portrait of Caracalla is the best known portrait of the Roman Emperor Caracalla. It is held at the Vatican Museums and several copies are known of it. It's made of Marble and stands 51 cm (20 in) tall.

Judging by the large number of copies and comparison with medieval copies, the type was first created on his assuming full responsibility for the empire after his murder of Geta in 212. He is shown with an unusual twist in the neck towards the left and an accentuation of psychological character, inspired by Hellenistic prototypes but with added Roman feeling. The bust on which the head rests is 18th-century, but probably similar to the original.

It inspired Michelangelo in his portrait of Brutus at the Bargello museum in Florence.

== Bibliography ==
- (in Italian) Ranuccio Bianchi Bandinelli and Mario Torelli, L'arte dell'antichità classica, Etruria-Roma, Utet, Torino 1976.
