= Brutus (Michelangelo) =

Sculpture by Michelangelo

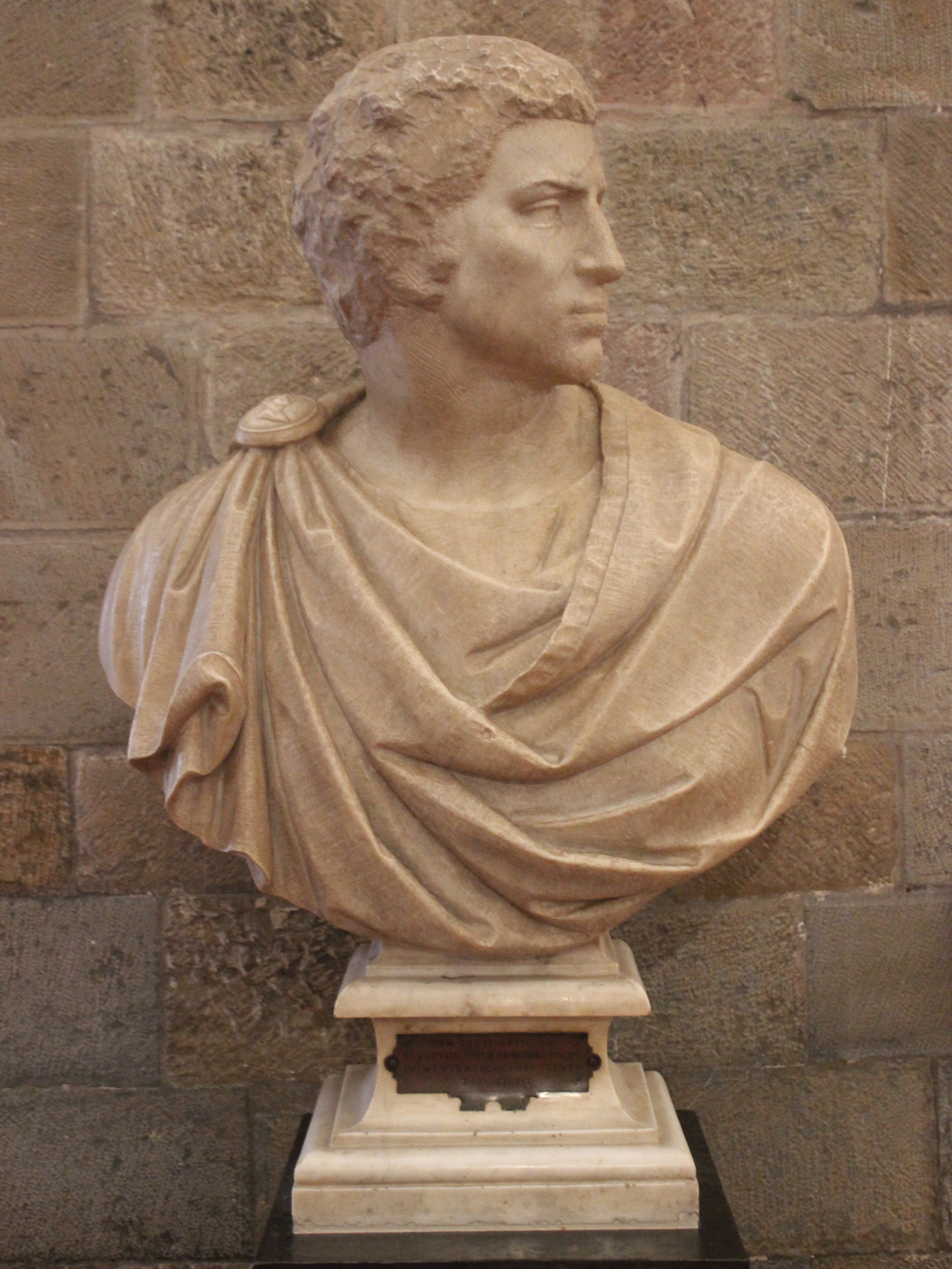
- Year: c. 1539–1540
- Medium: Marble
- Subject: Brutus
- Dimensions: height 74 cm (2 ft 5 in)
- Location: Bargello; Florence
- Preceded by: Risen Christ (Michelangelo, Santa Maria sopra Minerva)
- Followed by: The Deposition (Michelangelo)

Brutus is a marble bust of Marcus Junius Brutus sculpted by Michelangelo around 1539–1540. It is now in the Bargello museum in Florence.

The sculpture gives Brutus a heroic aspect in keeping with political sentiment against tyranny at the time of its creation. It belongs to—and may have initiated—a revival of the classical bust in sculpture.

== Background ==
Michelangelo carved Brutus a few years after the defeat of the Republic of Florence (1527–1531). As a supporter of the Florentine Republic who designed and supervised the remodeling and construction of its fortifications, Michelangelo was a strong opponent of tyranny.

In the Divine Comedy, Dante had placed Brutus among the lowest of the low. Michelangelo was much devoted to the poems of Dante, but with the Renaissance, Brutus came to be seen as a strong and defiant opponent of tyranny. "During the Renaissance, with the Roman Empire seen as the beginning of the decadence of Rome, a veritable cult of Brutus developed", Michelangelo's biographer Charles de Tolnay writes.

During the years following the capitulation of Florence, Michelangelo remained in contact with some of the former leaders of the Republic, men who championed the liberty of the city-state and opposed Medicean tyranny. De Tolnay believes that one of these men, namely Donato Giannotti, inspired the bust of Brutus. "The Bust is important for understanding [Michelangelo] Buonarroti's political views", De Tolnay states. "Michelangelo's conception of Brutus is clearly expressed in this bust: It represents heroic scorn for those who would destroy liberty". Contemporaries may have connected the sculpture with the assassination of Alessandro de' Medici, Duke of Florence, by Lorenzino de' Medici in 1537.

Johannes Wilde, another Michelangelo scholar, also sees the Brutus as a "glorification of liberty from tyranny". Wilde suggests that the sculpture remained unfinished.

== Date ==
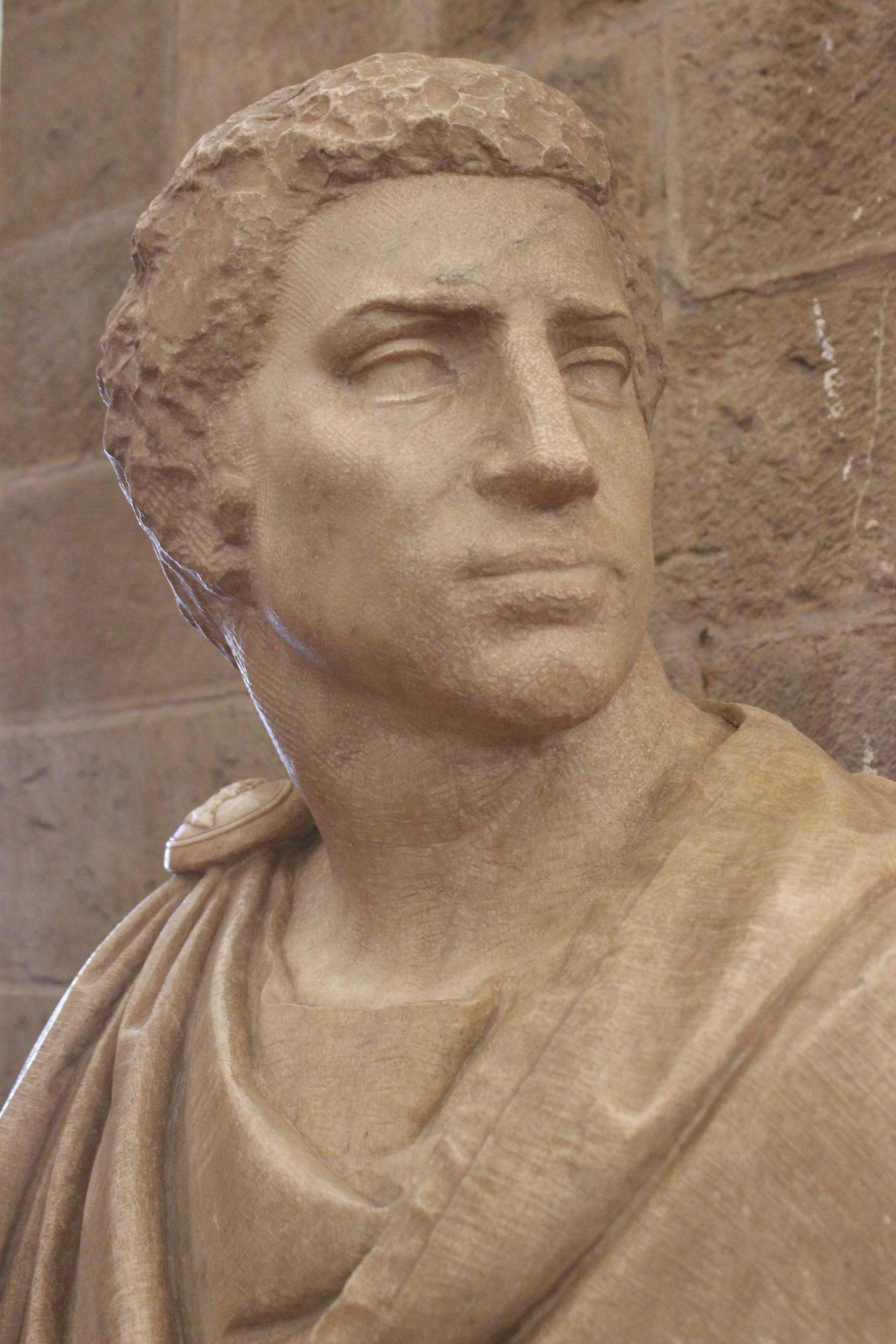
Brutus viewed from the side, looking into the face.

De Tolnay suggests that the bust was created around 1539–1540. The Museo Nazionale del Bargello in Florence, where the sculpture is usually displayed, also dates the work to 1539–1540 Thomas Martin questions this date, which originates with Giorgio Vasari, noting that Brutus did not leave Michelangelo's workshop until about 1555, suggesting that the sculpture might have been crafted over a long period, and was perhaps commissioned to commemorate the death of Lorenzino de' Medici in 1548.

The work is generally considered to have been influential in reviving the classical bust form in sculpture. In Martin's view, however, the later dates of the sculpture make it a latecomer to the trend. Brutus is compared with a marble bust of Duke Cosimo I created by Bartolommeo Bandinelli in 1543–1545 and another bust of Duke Cosimo created by Benvenuto Cellini in 1545–1547.

== The work ==
The sculpture was commissioned by the republican Donato Giannotti for Cardinal Niccolò Ridolfi.

The face of the sculpture is asymmetrical, with the side turned away from the spectator showing more signs of emotion, including a flared nostril.

=== Fibula as a study for the head ===
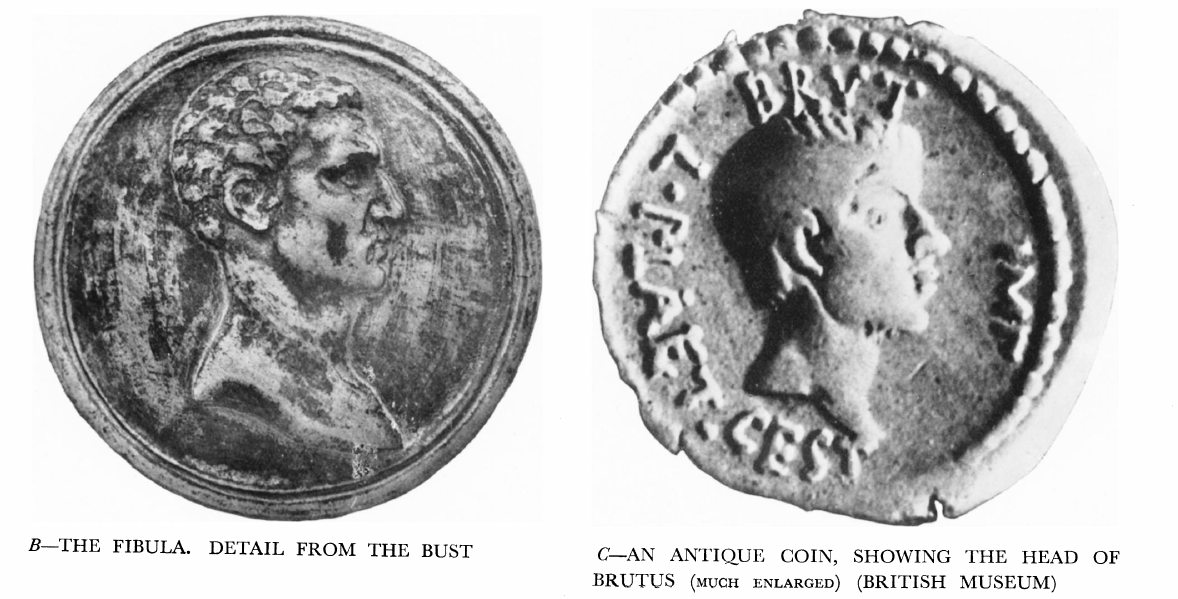
Comparison of fibula on Brutus's shoulder with classical depiction of Brutus on a coin

Giorgio Vasari wrote that Michelangelo had modeled Brutus from the image cut into a gem. Later scholars did not find the work to resemble any such extant gem, supposing instead that it may have been modeled after a bust of Caracalla. De Tolnay in 1935 published his observation that the fibula in the sculpture is a study for the sculpture itself, providing a missing link to show the resemblance to classical coinage.

The shape of the head itself is simpler than that of the silhouette on the shoulder. According to de Tolnay:

In the former (the fibula), the silhouette of the head is roundish; the forehead in relief shows movement; the outline of the nose is undulating; the line of the lips is soft; the chin is sharply rounded. In the latter (the bust), everything is simplified for cutting; the comparatively small head rises above an unusually broad bull-neck, and has an almost straight rectangular silhouette; the forehead is quite smoothed off; the nose is severely straight; the lips are hard; the chin is angular and protruding. The minor details have disappeared and only the form as a whole remains effective. This evolution from an empirical, individual prototype to a universal, ideal type is characteristic of Michelangelo's procedure, and may be seen even in his early work.

== See also ==
- List of works by Michelangelo
- Portrait of Caracalla
