= Risen Christ (Michelangelo, Santa Maria sopra Minerva) =

Statue by Michelangelo

Christ Carrying the Cross
- Italian: Cristo della Minerva
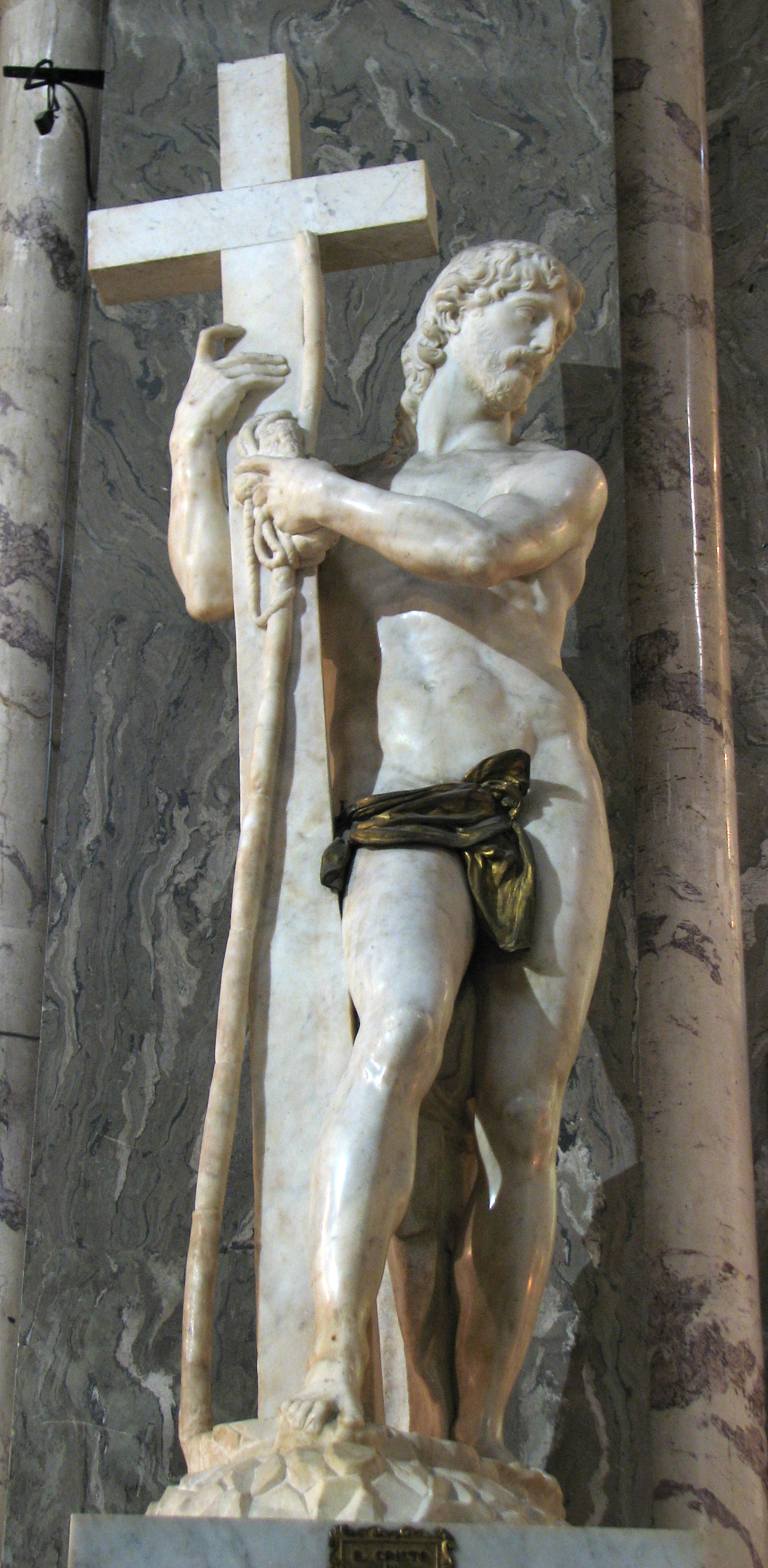
- Artist: Michelangelo
- Year: 1519–1521
- Type: Marble
- Dimensions: 205 cm (81 in)
- Location: Santa Maria sopra Minerva, Rome
- Preceded by: Crouching Boy
- Followed by: Brutus (Michelangelo)

The Risen Christ (Cristo della Minerva in Italian, also known as Christ the Redeemer or Christ Carrying the Cross) is a marble sculpture by the Italy High Renaissance master Michelangelo, finished in 1521. It is in the church of Santa Maria sopra Minerva in Rome, to the left of the main altar.

== History ==
The work was commissioned in June 1514, by the Roman patrician Metello Vari, who stipulated only that the nude standing figure would have the Cross in his arms, but left the composition entirely to Michelangelo. Michelangelo was working on a first version of this statue in his studio in Macello dei Corvi around 1515, but abandoned it in roughed-out condition when he discovered a black vein in the white marble, remarked upon by Vari in a letter, and later by Ulisse Aldrovandi. A new version was hurriedly substituted in 1519–1520 to fulfil the terms of the contract. Michelangelo worked on it in Florence, and the move to Rome and final touches were entrusted to an apprentice, Pietro Urbano; the latter, however, damaged the work and had to be quickly replaced by Federico Frizzi at the suggestion of Sebastiano del Piombo.

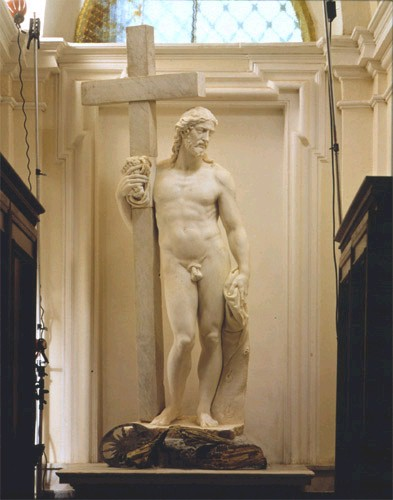
The first version, finished by a later artist.

The first version, rough as it was, was asked for by Metello Vari, and given him in January 1522, for the little garden courtyard of his palazzetto near Santa Maria sopra Minerva, come suo grandissimo onore, come fosse d'oro translated as "As his greatest honor, as if it were of gold", a mark of the esteem in which Michelangelo was held". There it remained, described by Aldrovandi in 1556, (Note: in una corticella ovvero un orticello, "in a little courtyard, or little garden": Aldrovandi, Delle Statue antiche, che per tutta Roma, in diversi luoghi, & case si veggono (Venice 1556)) and noted in some contemporary letters as apparently for sale in 1607, following which it was utterly lost to sight. In 2000 Irene Baldriga recognized the lost first version, finished in the early seventeenth century, in the sacristy of the church of San Vincenzo Martire, at Bassano Romano near Viterbo; the black vein is clearly distinguishable on Christ's left cheek. It is now often called the Giustiniani Christ. The parts finished later are the "right hand, parts of the face and the back".

Despite all these problems, the second version impressed the contemporaries. Sebastiano del Piombo declared that the knees alone were worthy of more than the whole Rome, which William Wallace has called "one of the most curious praises ever sung about a work of art" Christ is shown by Michelangelo unclothed in a standing pose. Christ's sexual organs are exposed in order to show that his sexuality is uncorrupted by lust and completely controlled by his will, so that in his resurrected body he shows his triumph over both sin and death. A floating bronze loincloth was added in 1546 which shields the genitals from view.

A leg is flexed and the head turned back, according to the principle of contrapposto. Compared to the first version, the more active pose allows more varied impressions when the statue is seen from different angles, "not only activating the space around him, but also suggesting an unfolding story". The first version was exhibited in the National Gallery, London in 2017, in the same room as a cast of the second version, drawings for it, and letter relating to it.

== See also ==
- List of works by Michelangelo
- List of statues of Jesus

== Notes and references ==
- Baldriga, Irene (December 2000). "The first version of Michelangelo's Christ for S. Maria sopra Minerva". Burlington Magazine. 142 (1173): 740–745. ISSN 0007-6287. Archived from the original on 2017-11-07.
- Steinberg, Leo (2014). The Sexuality of Christ in Renaissance Art and in Modern Oblivion. University of Chicago Press. ISBN 978-0-226-22631-6.
- Wallace, William E. (1997). "Michelangelo's Risen Christ". Sixteenth Century Journal. 28 (4): 1251–1280. doi:10.2307/2543577. ISSN 0361-0160. JSTOR 2543577.
