= Raci =

Raci or RACI may refer to:

== Places ==
- Raći, a village near Podgorica, Montenegro
- Raci, a village in Negomir Commune, Gorj County, Romania

== Other uses ==
- Raci (ethnonym), or Rascians, a name used to designate Serbs in the Middle Ages and early modern times
- Raci Şaşmaz (born 1973), Turkish producer, writer and actor
- RACI matrix (responsible, accountable, consulted, and informed), roles in project tasks or deliverables
- Reale Automobile Club d'Italia, former name of Automobile Club d'Italia, Italy
- Royal Australian Chemical Institute, the qualifying body and a learned society

== See also ==
- Raji (disambiguation)
