= Maria Raggi =

16th-century Catholic nun

Maria Raggi di Scio
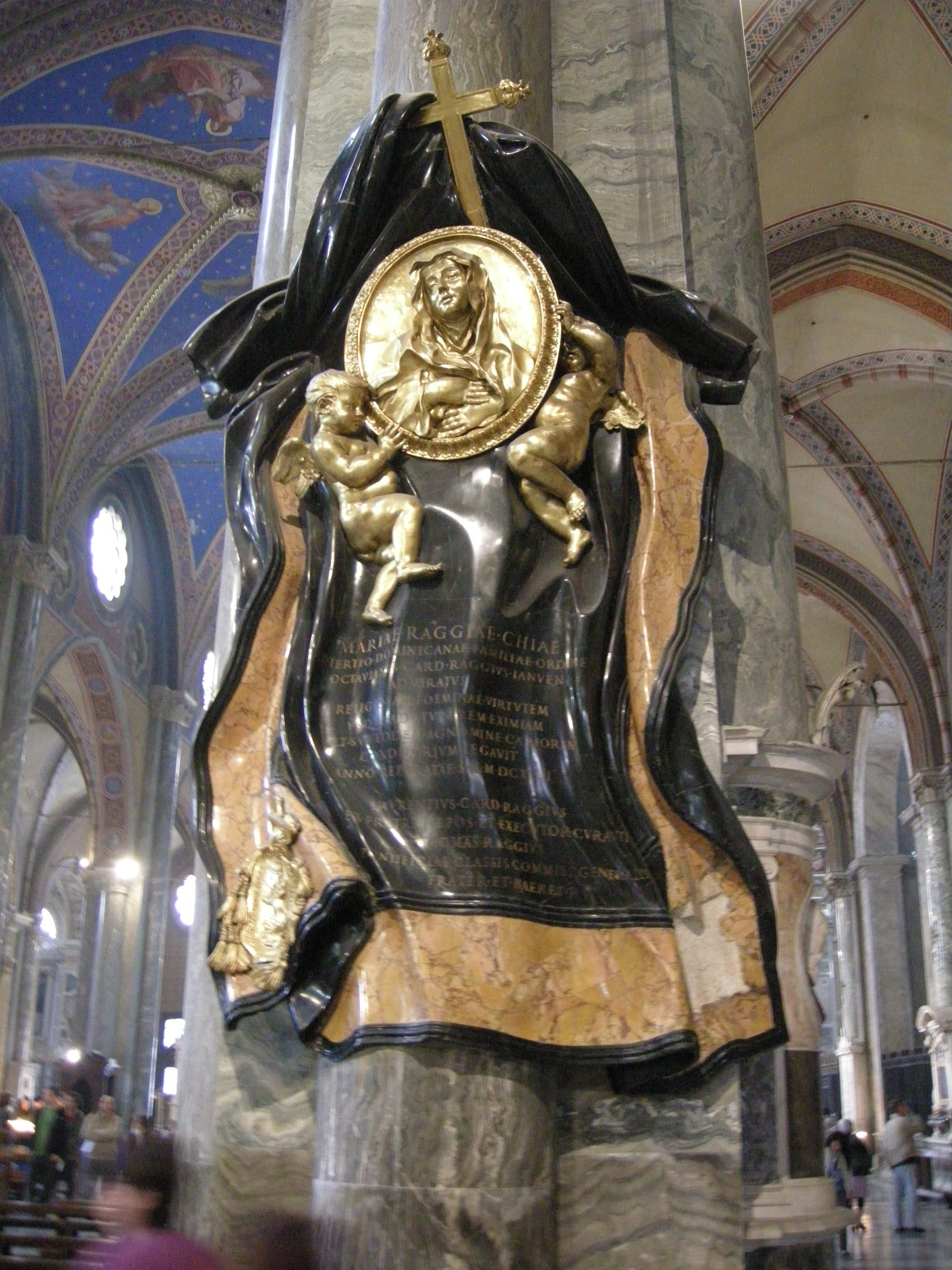
- Memorial to Maria Raggi by Gian Lorenzo Bernini in Santa Maria sopra Minerva, Rome (1647)
- Born: 1552; Chios, Greece
- Died: 1600 (aged 47–48); Rome
- Monuments: Memorial to Maria Raggi

Maria Raggi di Scio (1552–1600) was a Catholic nun from the island of Chios. In 1647 Italian artist Gian Lorenzo Bernini depicted her in a sculpture which resides on a nave of Santa Maria sopra Minerva church in Rome.

== Life ==
Maria was born in Chios to a Catholic family when the island was still part of the Republic of Genoa. She was forced to marry at an early age. Chios was captured by the Turks in 1566, and her husband was killed by Turkish forces in 1570. In 1571 she decided to become a nun. She departed for Rome in 1584, where she was offered hospitality at the Palazzo by the de Marini family, near Santa Maria sopra Minerva. An extremely pious woman, she spent much of her day in prayer and reportedly continually performed miracles. After she died in 1600, there was some possibility of her being canonised, but the general antipathy of Pope Urban VIII to such events meant the opportunity passed.

== See also ==
- Memorial to Maria Raggi
