= Mariano Santo =

Italian surgeon

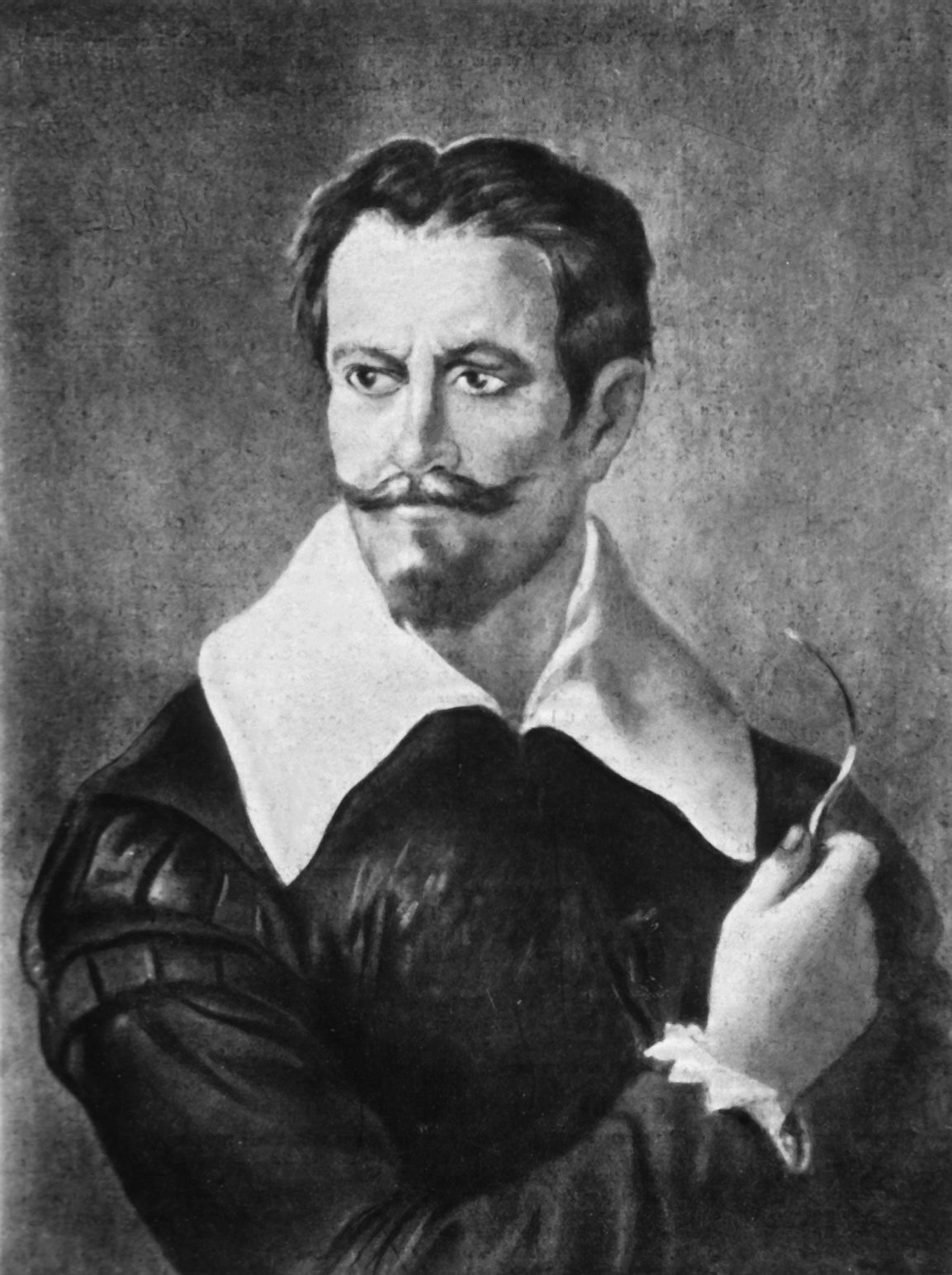
Mariano Santo

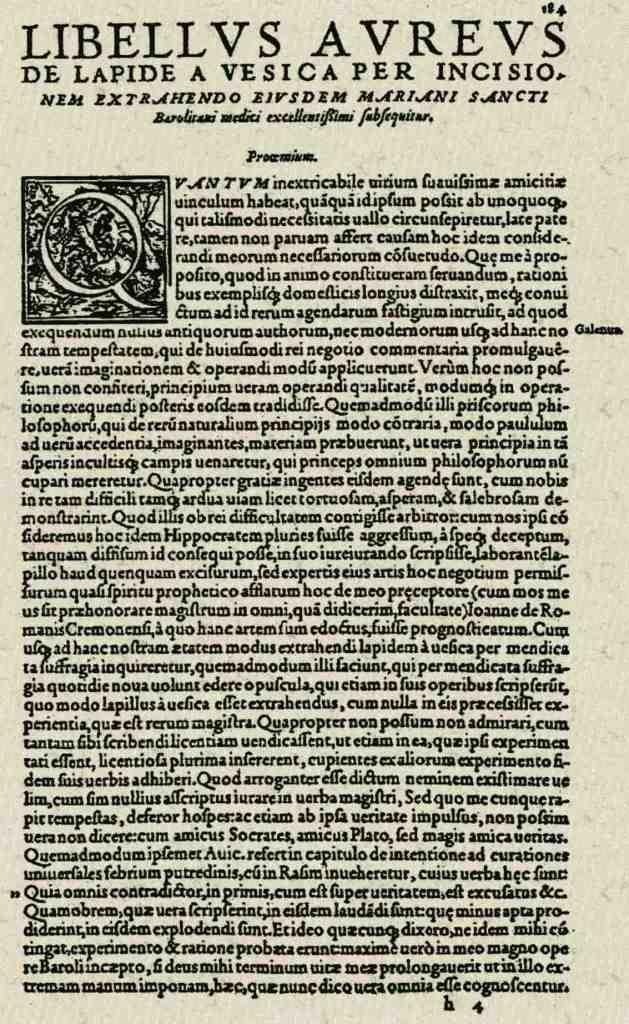
Proem of the Libellus Aureus

Mariano Santo (1488 in Barletta – 1577 in Rome) was a prominent surgeon of the 16th century.

He was born and raised in Barletta in 1488 and relocated to Rome in 1510 to study medicine. Following this, he became a surgeon and taught at Bologna University.

Eventually he returned to Baletta in 1520 for the death of his father and married Maddalena Braccio shortly after in 1524. Maddalena bore Mariano 4 sons and in 1526 they moved to Milan and in 1527 they again move settling in Ragusa (today Dubrovnik). He operated on battlefields during the war between Austria and Ottomans, and finally went to Venice.

Mariano’s written work includes the Artium et medicine and the very important Libellus Aureus de lapide a vesica per incisionem extrahendo and the De lapide renum. Additionally, he was the first in Europe to demonstrate a new surgical technique called "sectio mariana", which employs the use of a new tool, the "esploratorium", for the extraction of renal calculi.

He died in Rome in 1577 and is buried in Santa Maria sopra Minerva church.

== Works ==
- De lapide renum; De lapide vesicae per incisionem extrahendo, Paris
