= Hellenistic portraiture =

Greek art style from 323 BC to 31 BC

Hellenistic portraiture was one of the most innovative features of Hellenistic art. Spurred on by an increased interest in realism, Hellenistic sculptors sought to produce true-to-life portraits defined by the individualism of their subjects. Emergent at this time is a focus on a range of states of mind such as inebriation and concentration, as well as physical characteristics like senescence and anatomical abnormality - in great contrast with the idealised forms of the Classical period

== Lysippos ==
The great personality of Lysippus and the changed social and cultural conditions made it so that the remaining reservations towards physiognomic portraits were overturned, bringing about faithful depictions of facial features and of the spiritual character of individuals. In creating the portrait of Alexander the Great he transformed a physical defect which obliged the leader, according to the sources, to hold his head significantly tilted back on a shoulder into an upward-looking posture which seemed to allude to a certain celestial rapture, "a silent conversation with divinity"

Lysippus and his circle are also attributed - with a certain degree of consensus - the likeness of Aristotle (created while the philosopher was still alive), the reconstructed likeness of Socrates Type II, and that of Farnese Euripides. These works display a strong psychological dimension consistent with the figures' real-life achievements.

== Official portraiture ==
In official portraits, instead of the more strictly realist tendencies, it was favoured to give a more noble and dignified quality, with more solemn and distanced expressions, in order to reflect the subjects' divine lineage. The best examples of this are the portraits of Ptolemy III, Berenice II, Ptolemy VI, Mithridates VI, among others.

The bronze figure known as Juba II can also be ascribed to this trend, having in it certain parallels of Alexandrian marble works.

== Gallery ==
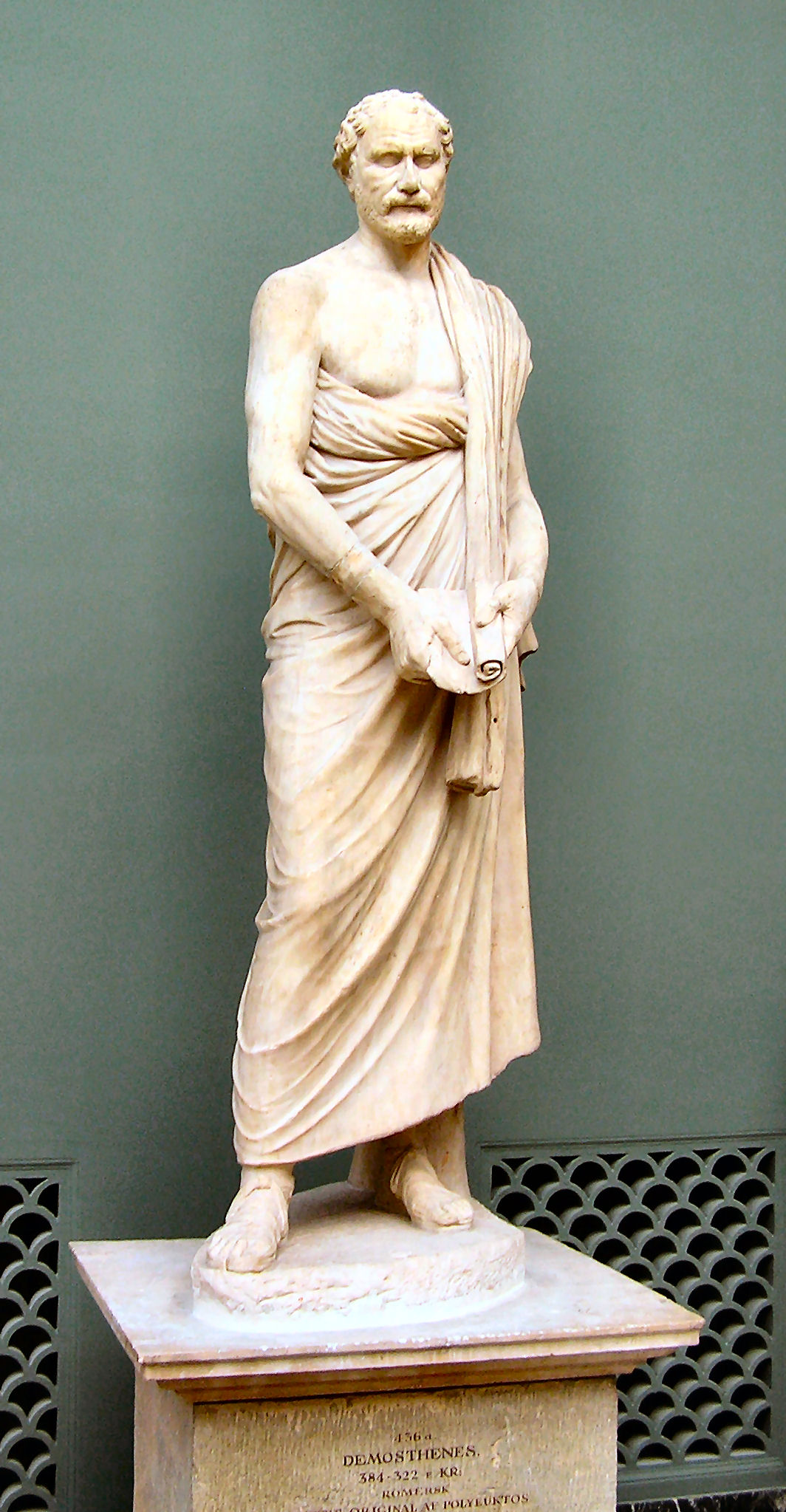
Portrait of Demosthenes

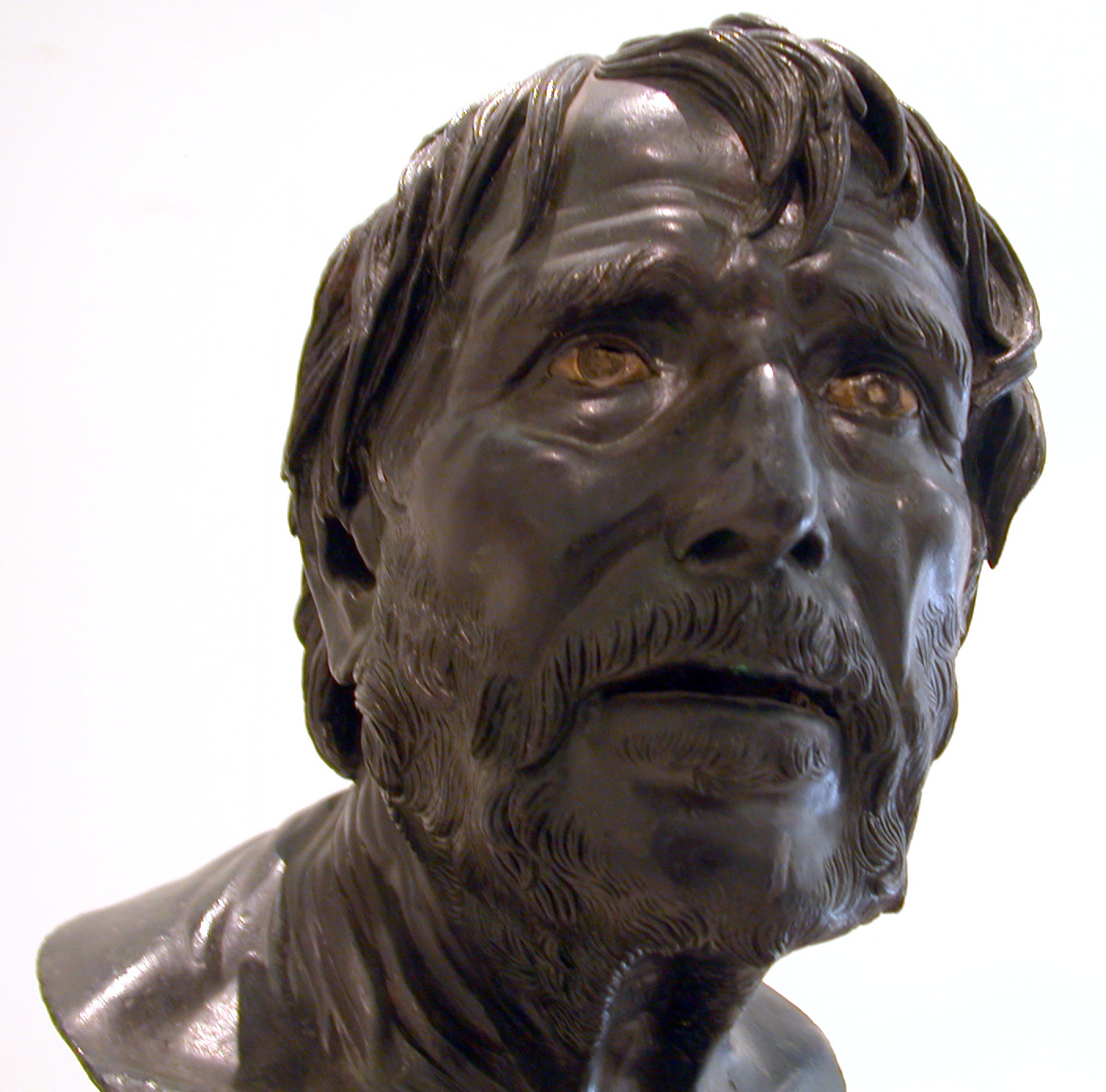
Pseudo-Seneca at Naples

== Bibliography ==
- (in Italian) Ranuccio Bianchi Bandinelli, Il problema del ritratto, in L'arte classica, Editori Riuniti, Rome 1984.
- Buschor, Ernst (1971). Das hellenistische Bildnis [The Hellenistic portrait]. 2nd edition. Munich: Beck, ISBN 3-406-00859-3.
- (in Italian) Pierluigi De Vecchi and Elda Cerchiari, I tempi dell'arte, volume 1, Bompiani, Milano 1999.
- Seilheimer, Horst (2003). Form- und kopienkritische Untersuchungen zum hellenistischen Porträt. Saarbrücken: COD-Verlag, ISBN 3-9807096-7-1.
- Smith, R. R. R. (1988). Hellenistic royal portraits. Oxford: Clarendon Press, ISBN 0-19-813224-7.
