= Memorial to Maria Raggi =

Artwork by Gianlorenzo Bernini

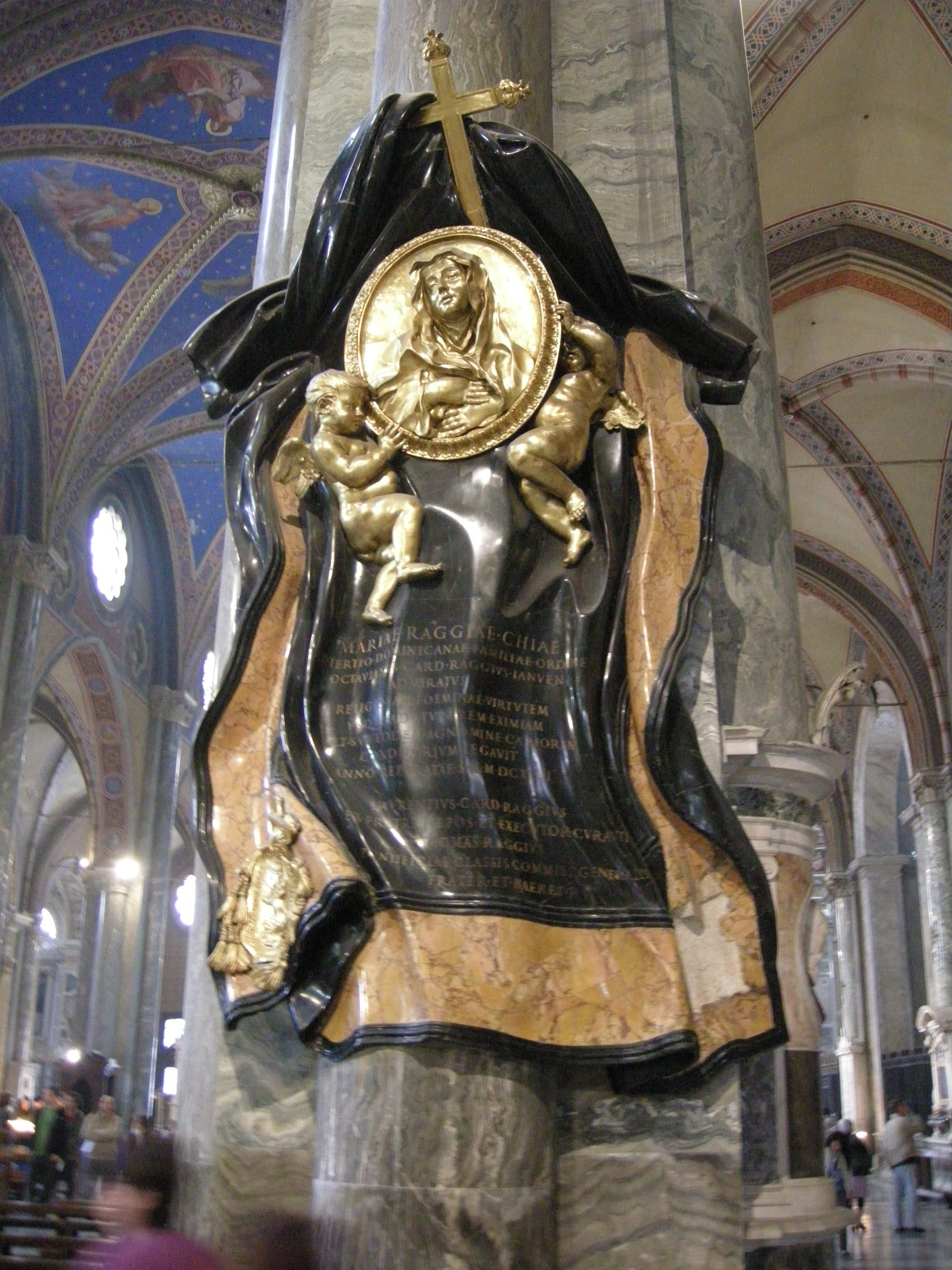
- Artist: Gian Lorenzo Bernini
- Year: 1647-1653
- Catalogue: 44
- Type: Sculpture
- Medium: Gilt bronze, marble relief
- Subject: Maria Raggi
- Location: Santa Maria sopra Minerva; Rome; 41.8980°N 12.4783°E
- Preceded by: Memorial to Ippolito Merenda
- Followed by: Raimondi Chapel

Memorial to Maria Raggi is a sculptural monument designed and executed by the Italian artist Gian Lorenzo Bernini, started in 1647 and finished in 1653. The monument is attached to a pillar in a nave of the church of Santa Maria sopra Minerva in Rome.

== Maria Raggi ==
Maria Raggi (1552–1600) was a nun from the island of Chios. Forced to marry at an early age, she was widowed when her husband was captured by Turkish forces in 1570. She became a nun in 1571, and departed for Rome in 1584, where she was resident at the Palazzo of the de Marini family, near Santa Maria sopra Minerva. An extremely pious woman, she spent much of her day in prayer, and reportedly continually performed miracles. After dying in 1600, there was some possibility of her being canonised, but the general antipathy of Pope Urban VIII to such events meant the opportunity passed.

== Patronage ==
Three descendants of Maria were responsible for commissioning Bernini to create the work, Ottaviano, Tommaso, and Lorenzo Raggi, whose names are noted in the Latin inscriptions in the bottom half of the memorial.

== See also ==
- List of works by Gian Lorenzo Bernini
