= Raggio =

- Language: Italian

Origin
- Language: Latin
- Origin: Raius
- Meaning: fame, glory

Raggio is an Italian surname. It is derived from the Latin word raius (English: fame, glory). Notable people with the surname include:

- Brady Raggio (born 1972), baseball player
- Giuseppe Raggio (1823–1916), Italian painter
- Grier Raggio, American lawyer and politician
- Louise Raggio, (1919–2011), American lawyer from Texas
- Luca Raggio (born 1995), Italian cyclist
- Olga Raggio (1926–2009), art historian and curator
- Silvano Raggio Garibaldi (born 1989), Italian football player
- Tommaso Raggio (1531–1599), Jesuit missionary
- William Raggio (1926–2012), American politician from Nevada
