= Raji =

Raji may refer to:

== People ==
=== Given name ===
- Raji Abdallah, Nigerian nationalist
- Raji Abdel-Aati (born 1985), Sudanese football midfielder
- Raji Arasu, Indian-American technology executive
- Raji Assefa, Ethiopian long-distance runner
- Raji Falhout, Syrian paramilitary leader
- Raji Jallepalli, Indian-American chef
- Raji James (born 1970), English actor
- Raji Rasaki (born 1947), Nigerian military officer
- Raji Sourani, Palestinian lawyer

=== Middle name ===
- Babatunde Raji Fashola, Nigerian lawyer and politician
- B. Raji Reddy, Indian politician

=== Surname ===
- Azita Raji (1961–2022), Iranian-born American diplomat, bank, and philanthropist
- B. J. Raji (born 1986), American football defensive tackle
- Bashiru Ademola Raji, Nigerian professor
- Corey Raji (born 1988), American and Nigerian basketball small forward
- Deborah Raji, Nigerian-Canadian computer scientist
- Lateef Raji, Nigerian politician
- Modibbo Raji, Islamic scholar
- Mustapha Raji, Liberian football administrator and engineer
- Rasheed Adisa Raji, Nigerian military governor
- Remi Raji, Nigerian poet
- Tasir Raji, Nigerian politician
- Toyin Raji (born c. 1970), Nollywood actress
- V. S. Raji, Indian politician
- Vijaye Raji, Indian-born technology executive

== Biology ==
- Raji cell, a human cell line

== Arts and entertainment ==
- Raji: An Ancient Epic, a video game released in 2020, set in Ancient India

== Others ==
- Raji people, of India and Nepal
  - Raji language, their Tibeto-Burman (Sino-Tibetan) language
- Raji–Raute languages, Sino-Tibetan language subgroup of western Nepal and Uttarakhand, India

== See also ==
- Dialects of Central Iran
- Raci (disambiguation)
