= Santa Maria sopra Minerva =

14th-century Dominican church in Rome

Basilica di Santa Maria sopra Minerva
- Basilica of Saint Mary above Minerva (English); Basilica Sanctae Mariae supra Minervam (Latin)
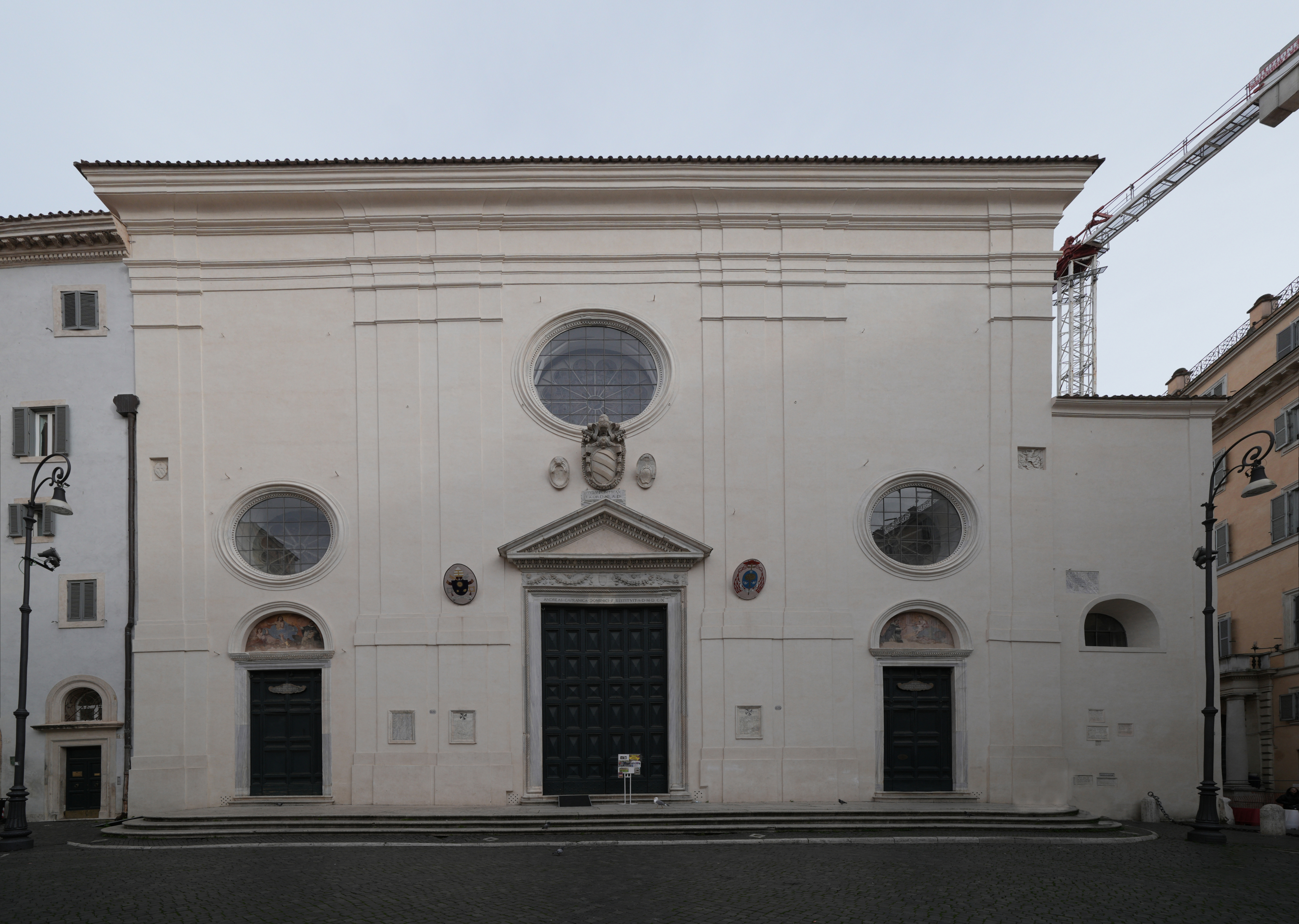
- Santa Maria sopra Minerva façade by Carlo Maderno
- Click on the map for a fullscreen view
- 41°53′53″N 12°28′42″E
- Location: Piazza della Minerva 42, Rome
- Country: Italy
- Denomination: Catholic
- Tradition: Latin Church
- Religious order: Dominicans
- Website: santamariasopraminerva.it/en

History
- Status: Minor basilica, titular church
- Dedication: Mary, mother of Jesus: Blessed John of Fiesole (Fra Angelico)
- Consecrated: 1370

Architecture
- Architect(s): Fra Sisto Fiorentino; Fra Ristoro da Campi; Carlo Maderno
- Style: Gothic
- Groundbreaking: 1280
- Completed: 1370

Specifications
- Length: 101 m (331 ft)
- Width: 41 m (135 ft)

Administration
- Province: Diocese of Rome

Santa Maria sopra Minerva is a minor basilica church and one of the major churches of the Dominican order in Rome, Italy. The church's name derives from the fact that the first Christian church structure on the site was built directly over (Italian: sopra) the ruins or foundations of a temple dedicated to the Egyptian goddess Isis, which had been erroneously ascribed to the Greco-Roman goddess Minerva (possibly due to interpretatio romana).

The church is located in Piazza della Minerva one block east of the Pantheon in the Pigna rione of Rome within the ancient district known as the Campus Martius. The present church and disposition of surrounding structures is visible in a detail from the Nolli Map of 1748.

While many other medieval churches in Rome were refurbished during the Baroque era, replacing their Gothic structure and decoration, the Minerva is the only extant example of original Gothic architecture church building in Rome. Behind a restrained Renaissance style façade the Gothic interior features arched vaulting that was painted blue with gilded stars and trimmed with brilliant red ribbing during a 19th-century Neo-Gothic restoration.

The church and adjoining convent served at various times throughout its history as the Dominican Order's headquarters. Today the headquarters have been re-established in their original location at the Roman convent of Santa Sabina. The titulus of Sanctae Mariae supra Minervam was conferred upon Cardinal António Marto, on 28 June 2018.

== History ==
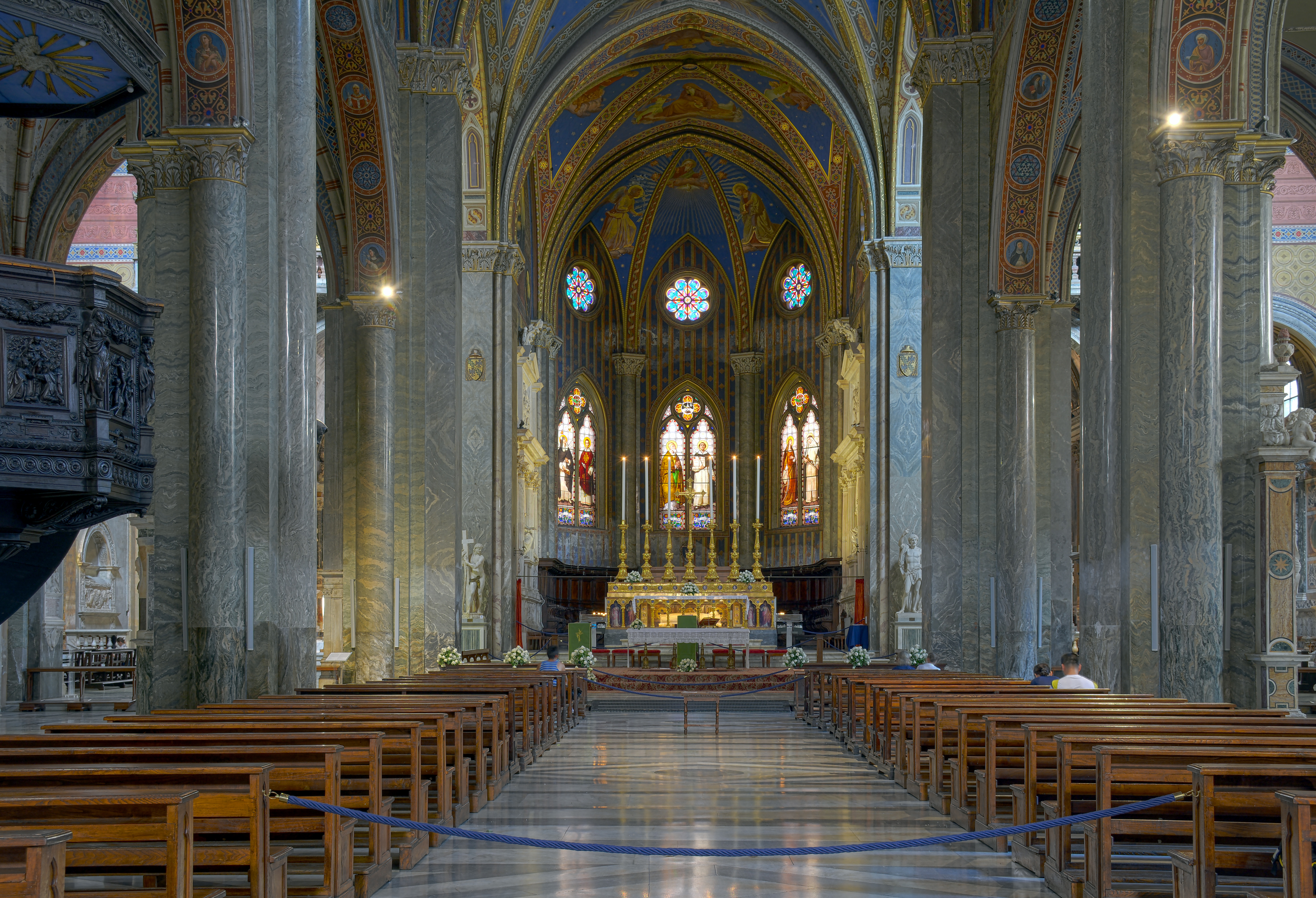
Interior of church

In Roman times there were three temples in what is now the area surrounding the basilica and former convent buildings: the Minervium, built by Gnaeus Pompey in honour of the goddess Minerva about 50 BC, referred to as Delubrum Minervae; the Iseum dedicated to Isis, and the Serapeum dedicated to Serapis. Details of the temple to Minerva are not known but recent investigations indicate that a small round Minervium once stood a little further to the east on the Piazza of the Collegio Romano. In 1665 an Egyptian obelisk was found, buried in the garden of the Dominican cloister adjacent to the church. Several other small obelisks were found at different times near the church, known as the Obelisci Isei Campensis, which were probably brought to Rome during the 1st century and grouped in pairs, with others, at the entrances of the temple of Isis. There are other Roman survivals in the crypt.

The ruined temple is likely to have lasted until the reign of Pope Zachary (741-752), who finally Christianized the site, offering it to Basilian nuns from Constantinople who maintained an oratorium there dedicated to the "Virgin of Minervum". The structure he commissioned has disappeared.

In 1255 Pope Alexander IV established a community of "converted women" (former prostitutes) on the site. A decade later this community was transferred to the Roman Church of San Pancrazio thereby allowing the Dominicans to establish a convent of friars and a studium conventuale there. The Friars were on site beginning in 1266 but took official possession of the Church in 1275. Aldobrandino Cavalcanti (1279), vicarius Urbis or vicar for Pope Gregory X, and an associate of Thomas Aquinas ratified the donation of Santa Maria sopra Minerva to the Dominicans of Santa Sabina by the sisters of S. Maria in Campo Marzio. The ensemble of buildings that formed around the church and convent came to be known as the insula sapientae or insula dominicana (island of wisdom or Dominican island).

The Dominicans began building the present Gothic church in 1280 modelling it on their church in Florence Santa Maria Novella. Architectural plans were probably drawn up during the pontificate of Nicholas III by two Dominican friars, Fra Sisto Fiorentino and Fra Ristoro da Campi. With the help of funds contributed by Boniface VIII and the faithful the side aisles were completed in the 14th century.

In 1453 church interior construction was finally completed when Cardinal Juan Torquemada ordered that the main nave be covered by a vault that reduced the overall projected height of the church. In the same year of 1453 Count Francesco Orsini sponsored the construction of the façade at his own expense. However work on the façade remained incomplete until 1725 when it was finally finished by order of Pope Benedict XIII.

In 1431, the Church and the adjacent Convent of the Dominicans was the site of a Papal conclave. The city of Rome was in an uproar upon the death of Pope Martin V (Colonna), whose family had dominated Roman political life for fifteen years, and enriched themselves on the wealth of the Church. There was fighting in the streets on a daily basis, and the Plaza in front of the Minerva, because of the configuration of streets, houses, church and monastery, could easily be fortified and defended. The Sacristy of the Church served as the meeting hall for the fourteen cardinals (out of nineteen) who attended the Conclave, which began on 1 March 1431. The dormitory of the friars in the Convent to the immediate north of the Church, served as the living quarters for the cardinals and their refectory and kitchen. On 3 March they elected Cardinal Gabriele Condulmaro, who took the name Eugenius IV. A second Conclave was held at the Minerva, on 4–6 March 1447, following the death of Pope Eugenius, once again in the midst of disturbances involving the Orsini supporters of Pope Eugenius and his enemies the Colonna. Eighteen cardinals (out of a total of twenty-six) were present and elected Cardinal Tommaso Parentucelli da Sarzana as Pope Nicholas V.

The Minerva has been a titular church since 1557, and a minor basilica since 1566. The church's first titular cardinal was Michele Ghislieri who became Pope Pius V in 1566. He raised the church to the level of minor basilica in that same year.

In the 16th century Giuliano da Sangallo made changes in the choir area, and in 1600 Carlo Maderno enlarged the apse, added Baroque decorations and created the present façade with its pilastered tripartite division in Renaissance style. Marks on this façade dating back to the 16th and 17th centuries indicate various flood levels of the Tiber 65 feet (20 metres).

Between 1848 and 1855 Girolamo Bianchedi directed an important program of restoration when most of the Baroque additions were removed and the blank walls were covered with neo-gothic frescos giving the interior the Neo-Gothic appearance that it has today.

The basilica's stained glass windows are mostly from the 19th century. In 1909, the great organ was constructed by the firm of Carlo Vegezzi Bossi. The organ was restored in 1999.

The inscriptions found in S. Maria sopra Minerva have been collected and published by Vincenzo Forcella.

=== Convent and Studium ===
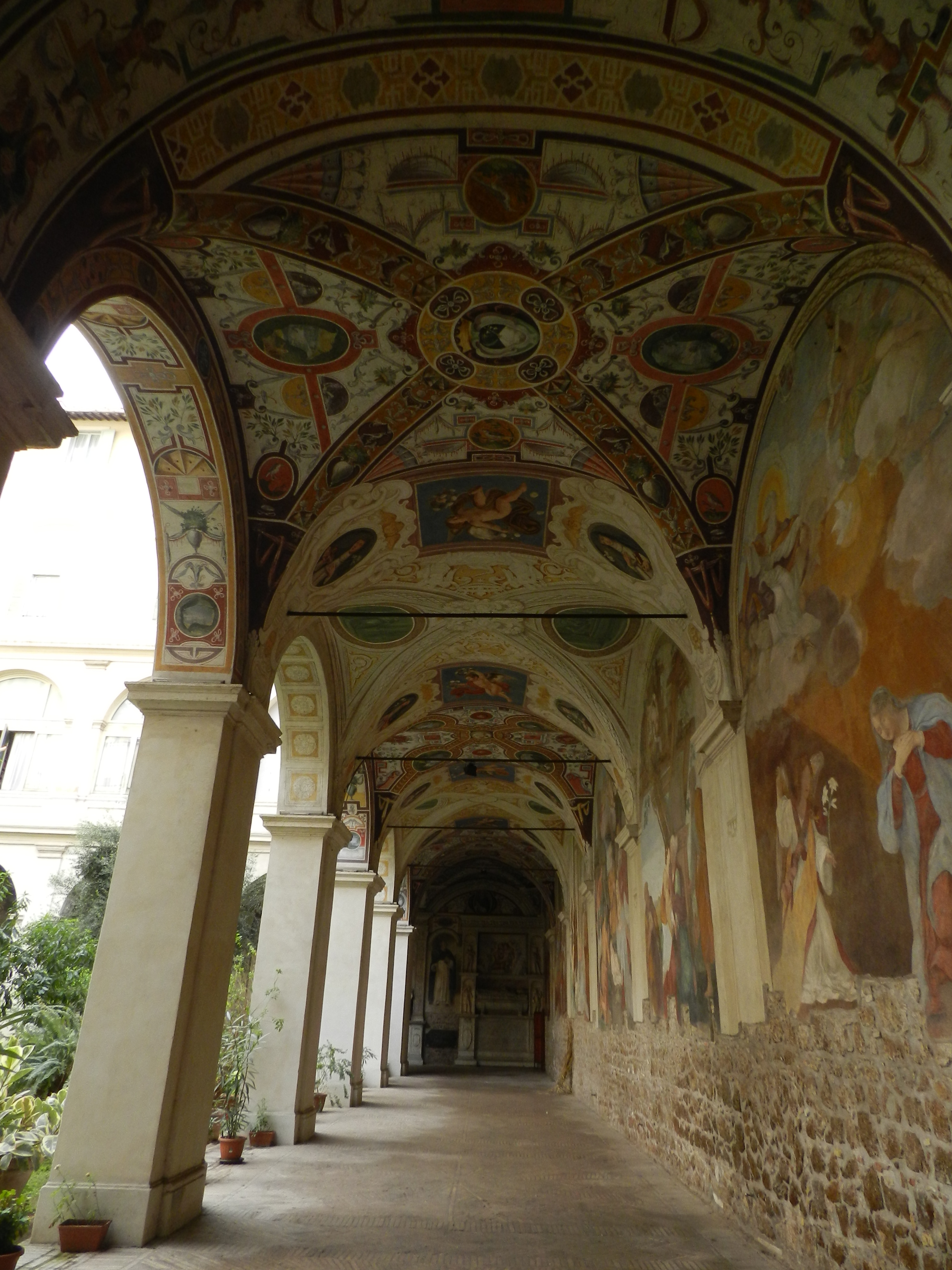
Cloister of the Basilica of Saint Mary of Minerva

In 1288 the theology component of the provincial curriculum for the education of the friars was relocated from the studium provinciale at the Roman basilica of Santa Sabina to the studium conventuale at Santa Maria sopra Minerva which was redesignated as a studium particularis theologiae. At various times in its history this studium served as a studium generale for the Roman province of the Order.

=== College of Saint Thomas ===
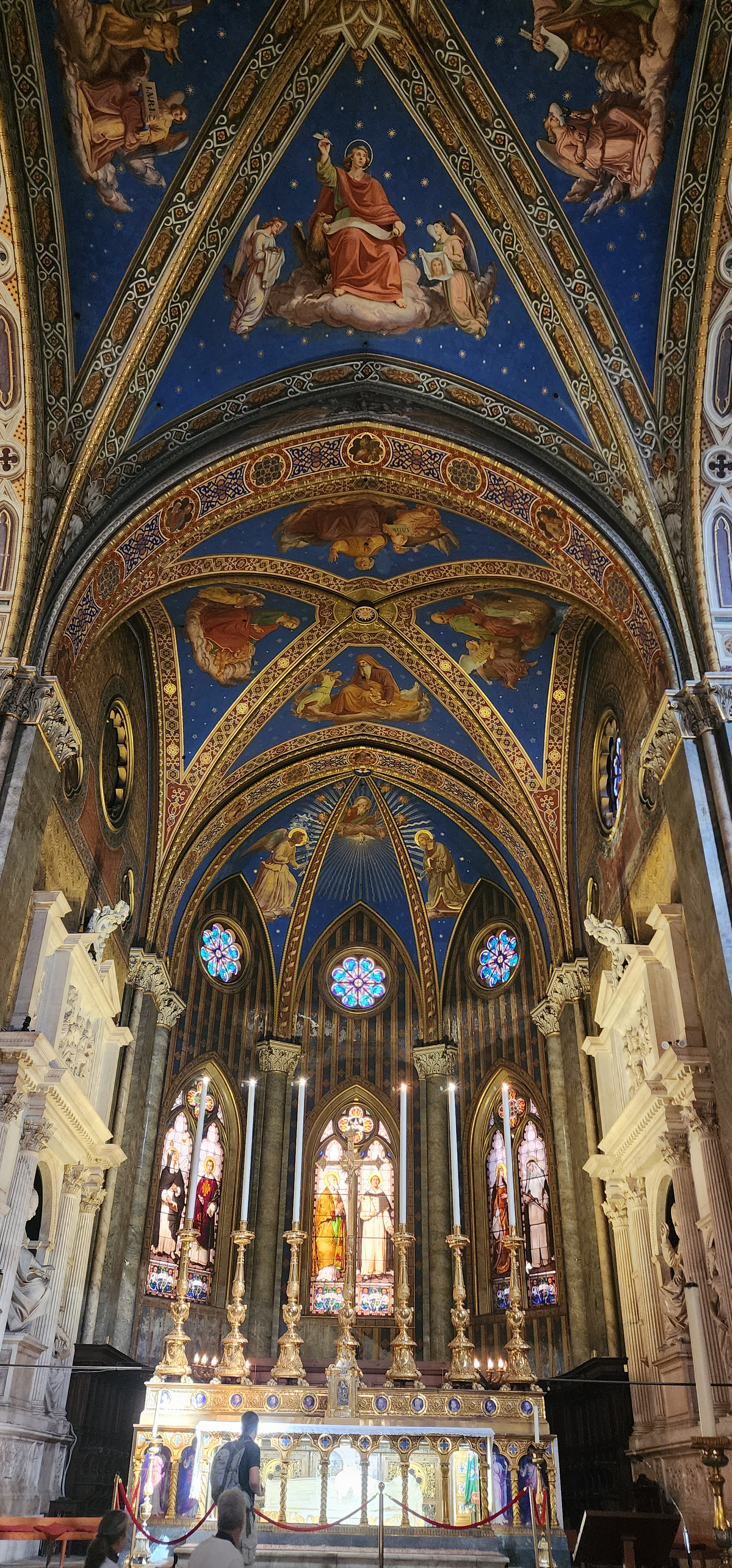
The painted ceiling of the nave.

The late 16th century saw the studium at Santa Maria sopra Minerva undergo transformation. Thomas Aquinas, who had been canonized in 1323 by Pope John XXII, was proclaimed the fifth Latin Doctor of the Church by Pius V in 1567. In his honor, in 1577 the Spanish Dominican Msgr. Juan Solano, O.P., former bishop of Cusco, Peru, funded the reorganization of the studium at the convent of Santa Maria sopra Minerva on the model of the College of St. Gregory at Valladolid in his native Spain. The result of Solano's initiative, which underwent structural change shortly before Solano's death in 1580, was the College of Saint Thomas (Latin: Collegium Divi Thomae) at Santa Maria sopra Minerva. The college occupied several existing convent structures, and new construction was required. At that time the convent underwent considerable reconstruction to accommodate the college and the cloister was redesigned so that side chapels could be added to the church's northern flank. A detail from the Nolli Map of 1748 gives some idea of the disposition of buildings when the Minerva convent housed the College of St. Thomas.

=== Offices of the Inquisition ===
On 14 September 1628, by papal decree, the convent of Minerva was designated as the seat of the Congregation of the Holy Office. It thus became the place where the tribunal of the Roman Inquisition set up by Paul III in 1542 held the Secret Congregation meetings during which the sentences were read out. It was in a room of the Minerva Convent on 22 June 1633 that the father of modern astronomy Galileo Galilei, after being tried for heresy, abjured his scientific theses, i.e. those of the Copernican theory.

In the late 18th and early 19th century the suppression of religious orders hampered the mission of the Order and the College of St. Thomas. During the French occupation of Rome from 1797 to 1814 the college declined and even briefly closed its doors from 1810 to 1815. The Order gained control of the convent once again in 1815, only for it to be expropriated by the Italian government in 1870.

In 1873 the Collegium Divi Thomæ de Urbe was forced to leave the Minerva for good, eventually being relocated at the convent of Saints Dominic and Sixtus in 1932 and being transformed into the Pontifical University of Saint Thomas Aquinas, Angelicum in 1963.

The Dominicans eventually were allowed to return to the Minerva and part of the convent.

== Interior ==
Among several important works of art in the church are Michelangelo's statue Cristo della Minerva (1521) and the late 15th-century (1488–93) cycle of frescos in the Carafa Chapel by Filippino Lippi. The basilica also houses many funerary monuments including the tombs of Doctor of the Church Saint Catherine of Siena (1347-1380), who was a member of the Third Order of Saint Dominic; the Dominican friar Blessed Fra Angelico (c. 1395–1455); and ornate monuments to the Medici popes: Leo X (born Giovanni de Medici, c. 1475–1521) and Clement VII (born Giulio de Medici, c. 1478–1534), designed by Baccio Bandinelli.

=== Carafa Chapel ===
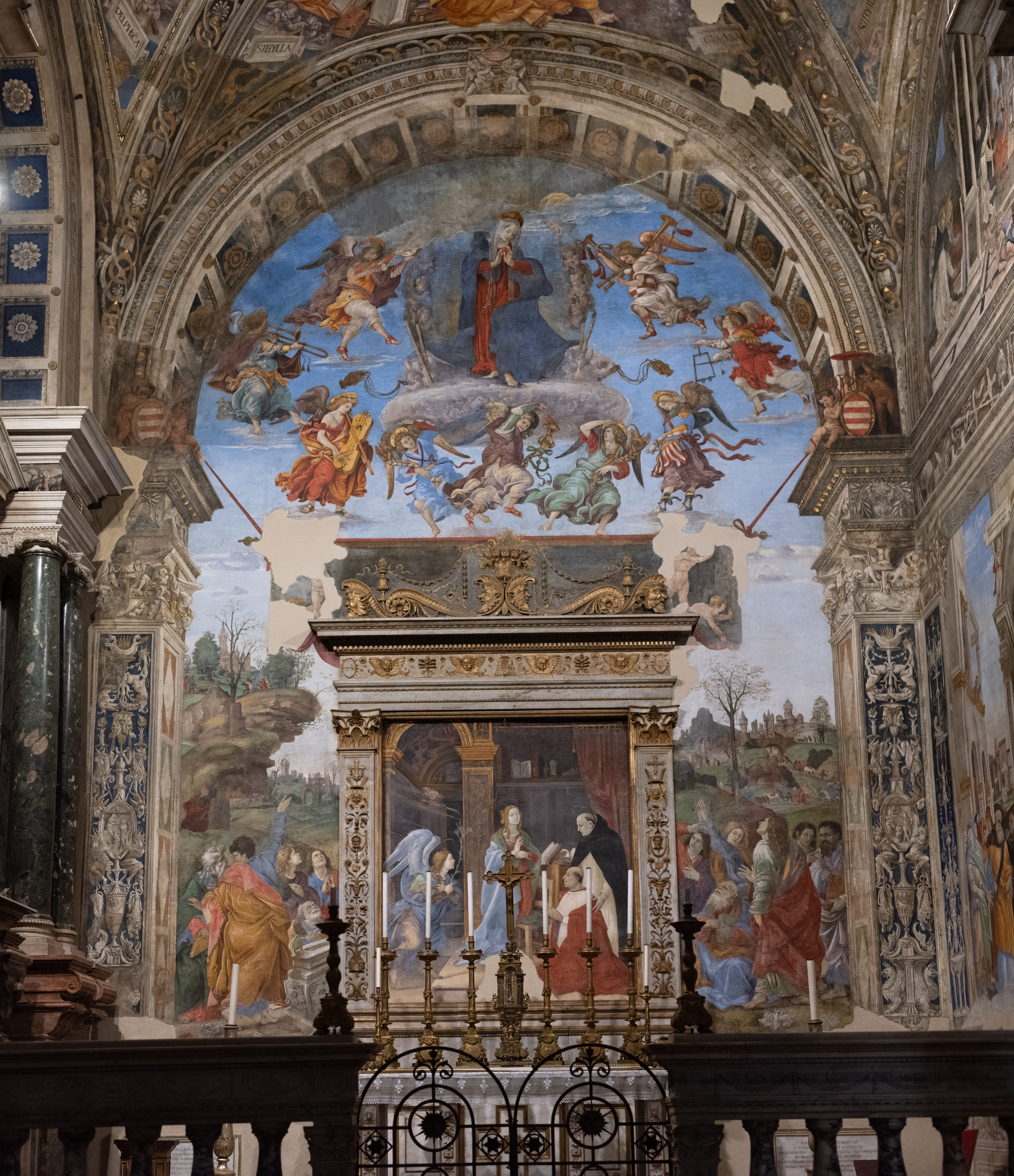
Carafa chapel in 2010

The Carafa Chapel is the second chapel in the right transept. It was inaugurated in 1493, and is also known as the Chapel of St Thomas Aquinas. It contains late 15th-century frescoes (1488–1493) by Filippino Lippi. The decoration was commissioned by Cardinal Oliviero Carafa. At the main altar are two Marian scenes. In the center is both an Annunciation and St Thomas Aquinas (who was a Dominican priest) presenting Cardinal Carafa to the Blessed Virgin. Atop is an Assumption of Mary with the apostles in the flanks observing in amazement. At right-hand wall, the fresco depicts the Glory of St Thomas. The left wall depicts events highlighting the scholasticism and miracles of St Thomas. The relics of St Thomas Aquinas were kept in this chapel until 1511, when they were moved to Naples. Designed by Pirro Ligorio in 1559, the tomb of Gian Pietro Carafa, who became Pope Paul IV in 1555, is also in the chapel.

=== Cappella Capranica ===
The chapel, located near the choir, is also known as the Chapel of the Rosary. The stucco ceiling was made in 1573 by Marcello Venusti. The chapel contains the tomb (circa 1470) of Cardinal Domenico Capranica by Andrea Bregno.

=== Michelangelo's Cristo della Minerva ===
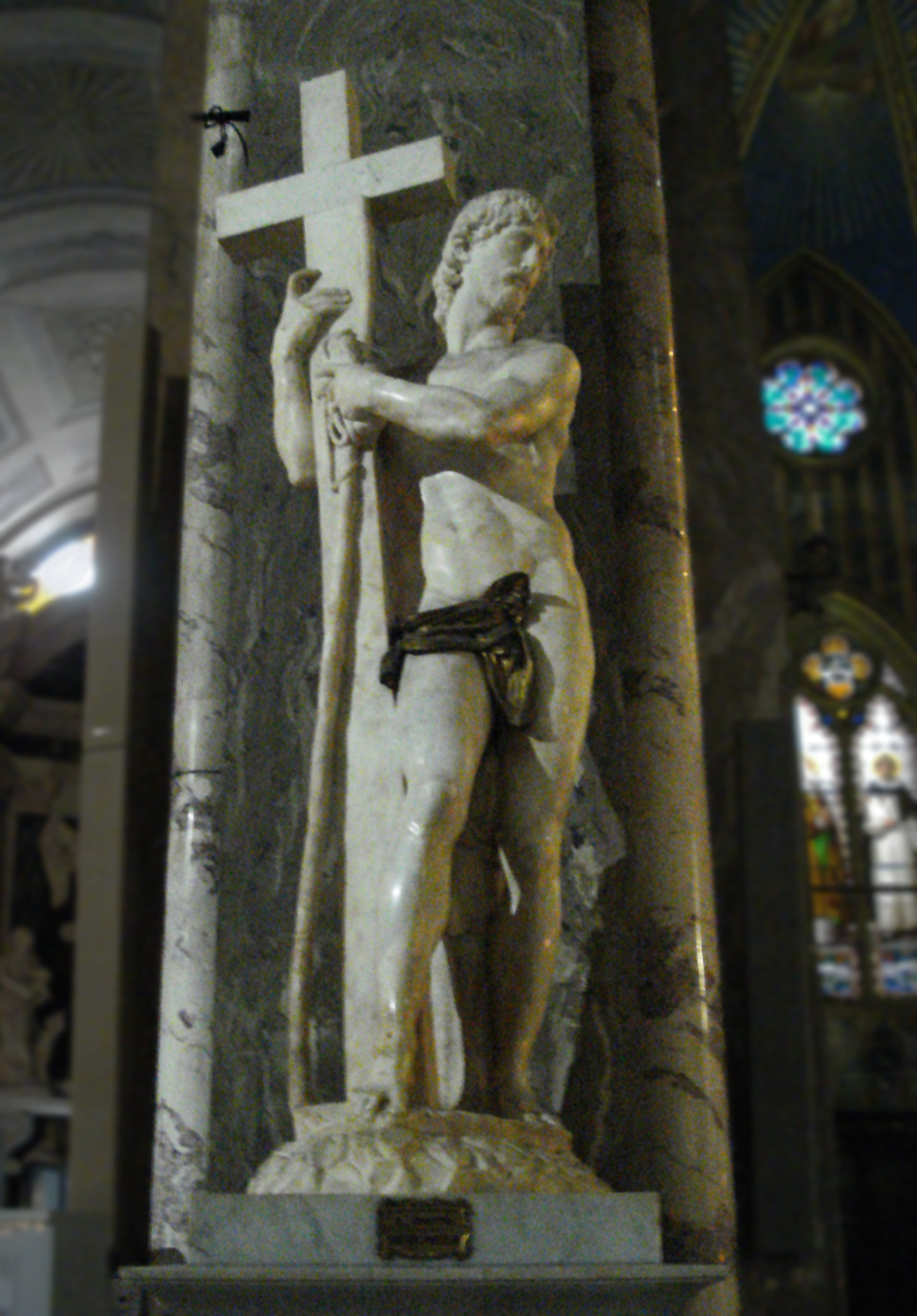
Michelangelo's Christ the Redeemer near the altar

The Cristo della Minerva, also known as Christ the Redeemer or Christ Carrying the Cross, is a marble sculpture by Michelangelo Buonarroti, finished in 1521, located to the left of the main altar.

=== Cappella Aldobrandini ===
The Aldobrandini chapel was designed by Giacomo della Porta but it is Carlo Maderno that completed della Porta's project (after 1602). It was consecrated in 1611. The canvas depicting the Institution of the Eucharist and dated from 1594 is by Federico Fiori. The monument to the parents of Pope Clement VIII, Salvestro Aldobrandini and Luisa Dati, is by Giacomo della Porta. The first Confraternity of the Blessed Sacrament to be approved by the Holy See was established in this chapel, with St. Ignatius of Loyola as one of its earliest members. This chapel contains the Federico Barocci altarpiece depicting the Communion of the Apostles.

=== Cappella Raymond of Penyafort ===
The chapel dedicated to Raymond of Penyafort houses the tomb of Cardinal Juan Díaz de Coca, by Andrea Bregno. The ceiling fresco Jesus Christ as a Judge, between two angels is by Melozzo da Forlì.

=== Other major artworks ===
- Annunciation (1485), by Antoniazzo Romano - shows Cardinal Juan de Torquemada OP presenting girls who received a dowry by his Guild of the Annunciation to the Virgin. The cardinal is buried nearby.
- The tombs of the Popes Leo X and Clement VII by Baccio Bandinelli (1541)
- Tomb of Urban VII
- Tomb of Fra Angelico, by Isaia da Pisa (1455)
- Tomb of Guillaume Durand the Elder, Bishop of Mende (1285-1296), the 13th-century canonist; signed by Giovanni di Cosma (1296)
- Memorial to Maria Raggi, by Gian Lorenzo Bernini (between 1647 and 1653)
- Tomb of Cardinal Domenico Pimentel by Gian Lorenzo Bernini (1653)
- Tomb of Francesco Tornabuoni (1480), one of the best works by Mino da Fiesole

=== Burials ===
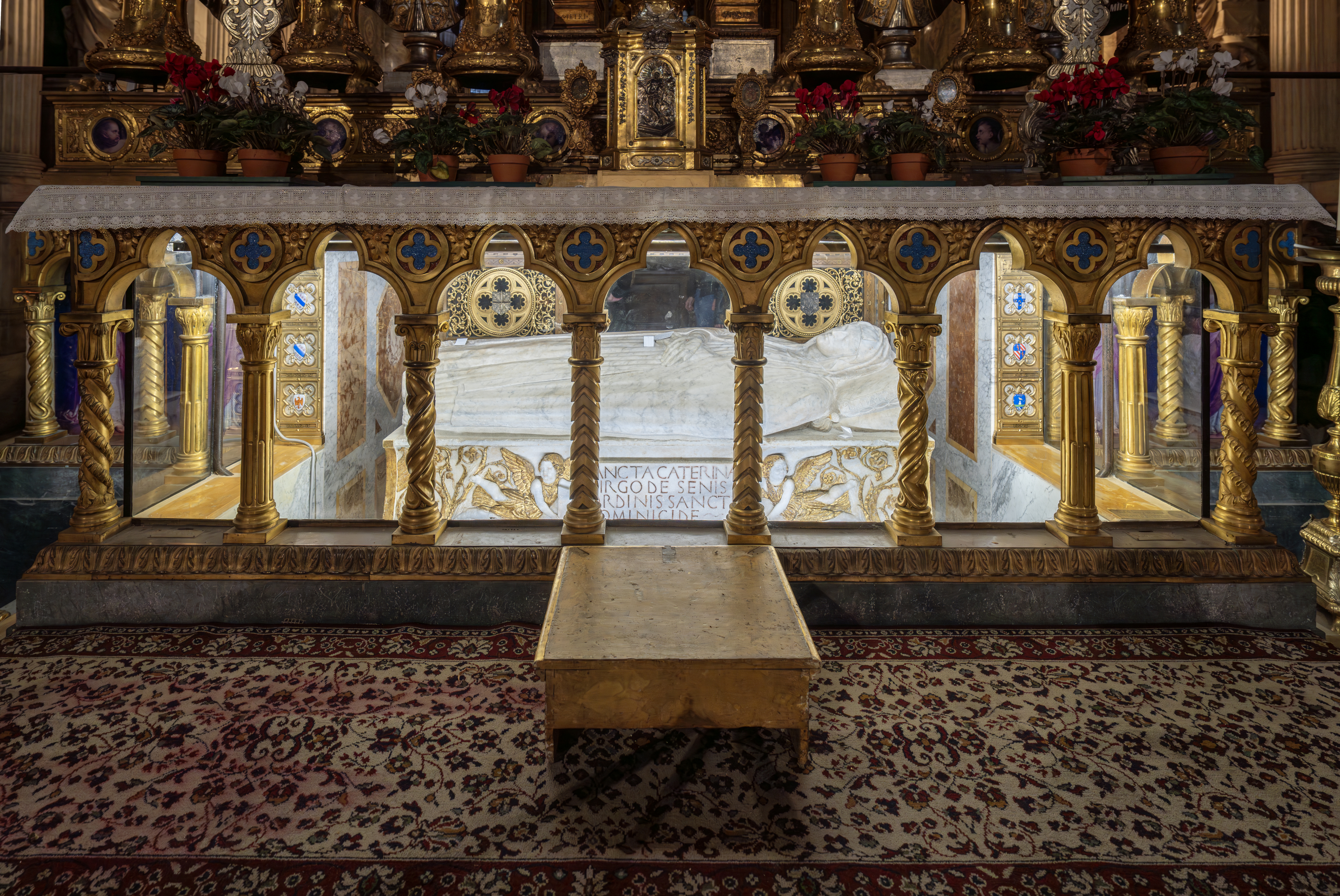
Sarcophagus of Saint Catherine of Siena beneath the High Altar

Saint Catherine of Siena is buried here (with the exception of her head, which is in the Basilica of San Domenico in Siena). Beyond the sacristy, the room where she died in 1380 was reconstructed here by Antonio Barberini in 1637. This room is the first transplanted interior, and the progenitor of familiar 19th and 20th century museum "period rooms." The frescoes by Antoniazzo Romano that decorated the original walls, however, are now lost.

The famous early Renaissance painter Fra Angelico died in the adjoining convent and was buried in the church. (He had painted a fresco cycle in the cloister on the initiative of Cardinal Juan de Torquemada, but those paintings have not survived.)

Before the construction of San Giovanni dei Fiorentini, the Minerva served as the church in Rome of the Florentines, and therefore it contains numerous tombs of prelates, nobles and citizens coming from that Tuscan city. For example, the elaborate tombs of the Medici Popes - Leo X (Giovanni de Medici) and Clement VII (Giulio de Medici) - are located here, designed by Florentine sculptor Baccio Bandinelli. Curiously, Diotisalvi Neroni, a refugee who had taken part in the plot against Piero de' Medici, is also buried in the church.

The tombs of Popes Urban VII and Paul IV are located in Santa Maria sopra Minerva, as are the Cardinal-nephew of Pope Nicholas III Latino Malabranca Orsini, Michel Mazarin (Archbishop of Aix) who was the brother of Cardinal Jules Mazarin, the Byzantine philosopher George of Trebizond, and two Renaissance theorists and practitioners, Filarete in architecture and Mariano Santo in surgery.

Cardinal Astorgio Agnensi has his tomb monument in the cloister.

== List of cardinal-priests from Santa Maria sopra Minerva ==
- 1557–1566 Michele Ghisleri (later Pope Pius V)
- 1566–1589 Michele Bonelli
- 1589–1602 Girolamo Bernerio
- 1602–1608 François-Marie Thaurusi
- 1608–1616 Filippo Spinelli
- 1616–1621 Ladislao d'Aquino
- 1621–1639 Giulio Roma
- 1643–1654 Giambattista Altieri
- 1655–1679 Jean François Paul de Gondi
- 1679–1694 Philip Howard of Norfolk
- 1694–1699 José Saenz d'Aguirre
- 1701–1729 Louis Antoine de Noailles
- 1729–1730 Agustín Pipia
- 1730–1747 Philipp Ludwig von Sinzendorf
- 1747–1762 Daniele Delfino
- 1758–1770 Giuseppe Pozzobonelli
- 1770–1782 Scipione Borghese
- 1783–1787 Tommaso Maria Ghilini
- 1787–1800 Vincenzo Ranuzzi
- 1801–1814 Giulio Maria della Somaglia
- 1816–1822 Francesco Fontana
- 1823–1828 Francesco Bertazzoli
- 1829–1832 Benedetto Barberini
- 1832–1836 Giuseppe Maria Velzi
- 1838–1850 Antonio Francesco Orioli
- 1850–1854 Raffaele Fornari
- 1854–1857 Guilherme Henriques de Carvalho
- 1857–1860 Francesco Gaude
- 1861–1864 Gaetano Bedini
- 1868–1870 Matteo Eustachio Gonella
- 1875–1885 John McCloskey
- 1887–1894 Zeferino González y Díaz Tuñón
- 1895–1896 Egidio Mauri
- 1896–1909 Serafino Cretoni
- 1911–1918 John Murphy Farley
- 1919–1922 Teodoro Valfre di Bonzo
- 1922–1926 Stanislas Touchet
- 1926–1929 Giuseppe Gamba
- 1930–1938 Giulio Serafini
- 1939–1946 Eugène Tisserant
- 1946–1965 Clemente Micara
- 1967–1974 Antonio Samorè
- 1976–1977 Dino Staffa
- 1979–1998 Anastasio Ballestrero
- 2001–2017 Cormac Murphy-O'Connor
- 2018–present António Marto

== Minerva's Pulcino ==
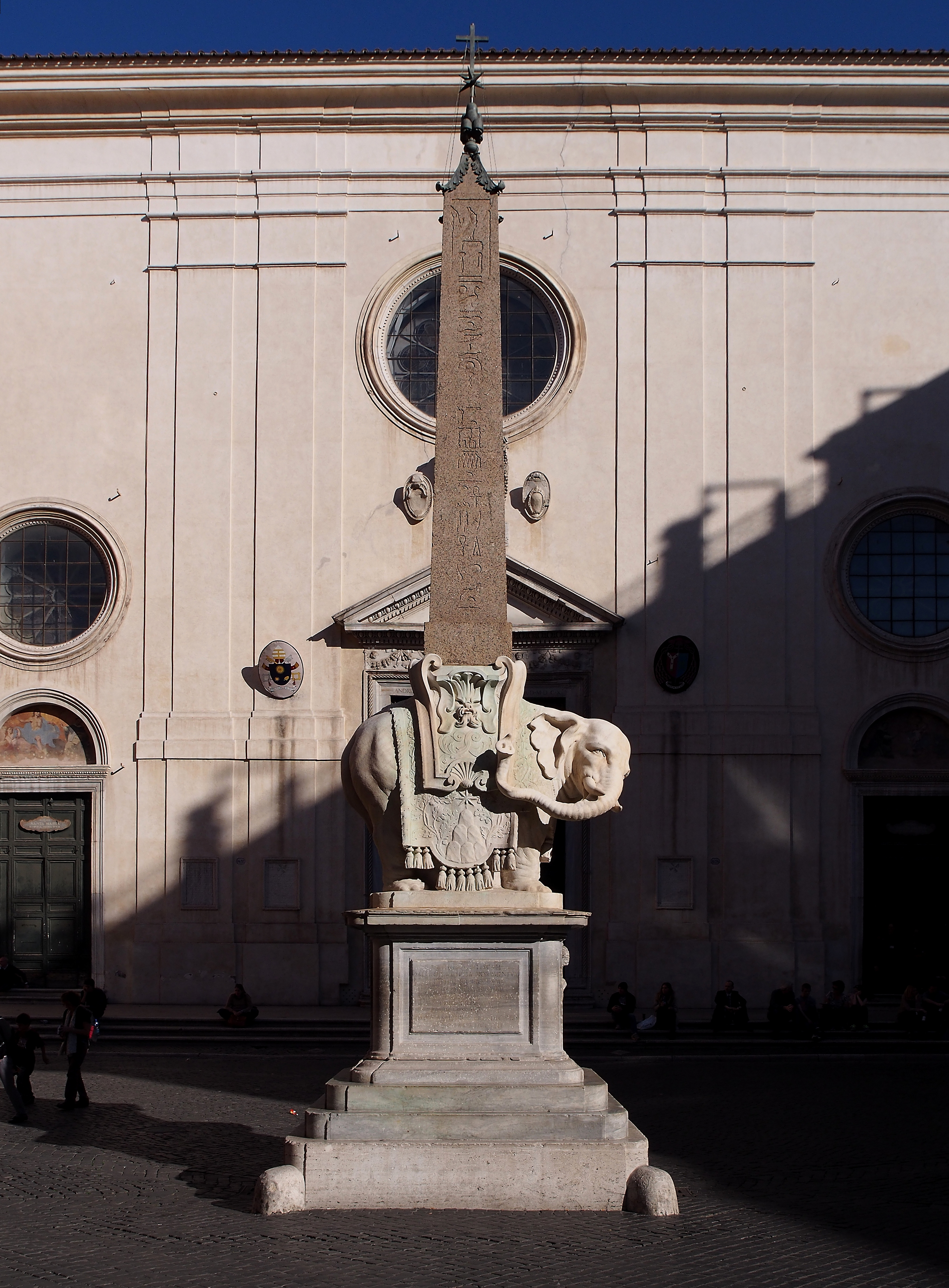
The Pulcino della Minerva, the famous elephant sculpture by Bernini and Ercole Ferrata, making the base of one of Rome's eleven Egyptian obelisks.

In front of the church there is one of the most curious monuments of Rome, the so-called Pulcino della Minerva. It is a statue designed by the Baroque era sculptor Gian Lorenzo Bernini (and executed by his pupil Ercole Ferrata in 1667) of an elephant as the supporting base for the Egyptian obelisk found in the Dominicans' garden. It is the shortest of the eleven Egyptian obelisks in Rome and is said to have been one of two obelisks moved from Sais, where they were built during the 589 BC-570 BC reign of the pharaoh Apries, from the Twenty-sixth dynasty of Egypt. The two obelisks were brought to Rome by Diocletian, during his reign as emperor from 284 to 305, for placement at the Temple of Isis, which stood nearby. The Latin inscription on the base, chosen by the pope who commissioned the sculpture to support the obelisk found on the site, Alexander VII, is said to represent that "...a strong mind is needed to support a solid knowledge".

The inspiration for the unusual composition came from Hypnerotomachia Poliphili ("Poliphilo's Dream of the Strife of Love"), an unusual 15th century novel probably by Francesco Colonna. The novel's main character meets an elephant made of stone carrying an obelisk, and the accompanying woodcut illustration in the book is quite similar to Bernini's design for the base for the obelisk. The curious placement of the obelisk through the body of the elephant is identical.

The sturdy appearance of the structure earned it the popular nickname of "Porcino" ("Piggy") for a while. The name for the structure eventually changed to Pulcino, the Italian for a small or little "chick". This may have been a reference to the comparatively short height of the obelisk or, an obscure reference to the major charity of the Dominicans to assist young women needing dowries, who made a procession in the courtyard every year. The latter were once depicted in a local painting as three tiny figures with the Virgin Mary presenting purses to them.

== Cultural references ==
The elephant and obelisk monument and the church of Santa Maria sopra Minerva feature in the novel 'The Tomb of Alexander' by Sean Hemingway. In the novel it is claimed that a secret passageway beneath the church leads to a chamber beneath the elephant monument which contains the body of Alexander the Great, placed there in the 17th century by Pope Alexander VII. This is entirely a work of fiction and the theory is unproven.

Dalí's painting 'Les Elephants' includes two elephants with long spindly legs that appear to be carrying obelisks; on closer inspection, the obelisks are floating. Dalí also utilizes this motif in Dream Caused by the Flight of a Bee Around a Pomegranate a Second Before Awakening (1944) and The Temptation of Saint Anthony (1946). See Monica Bowen's blog Alberti's Window.

== Gallery ==
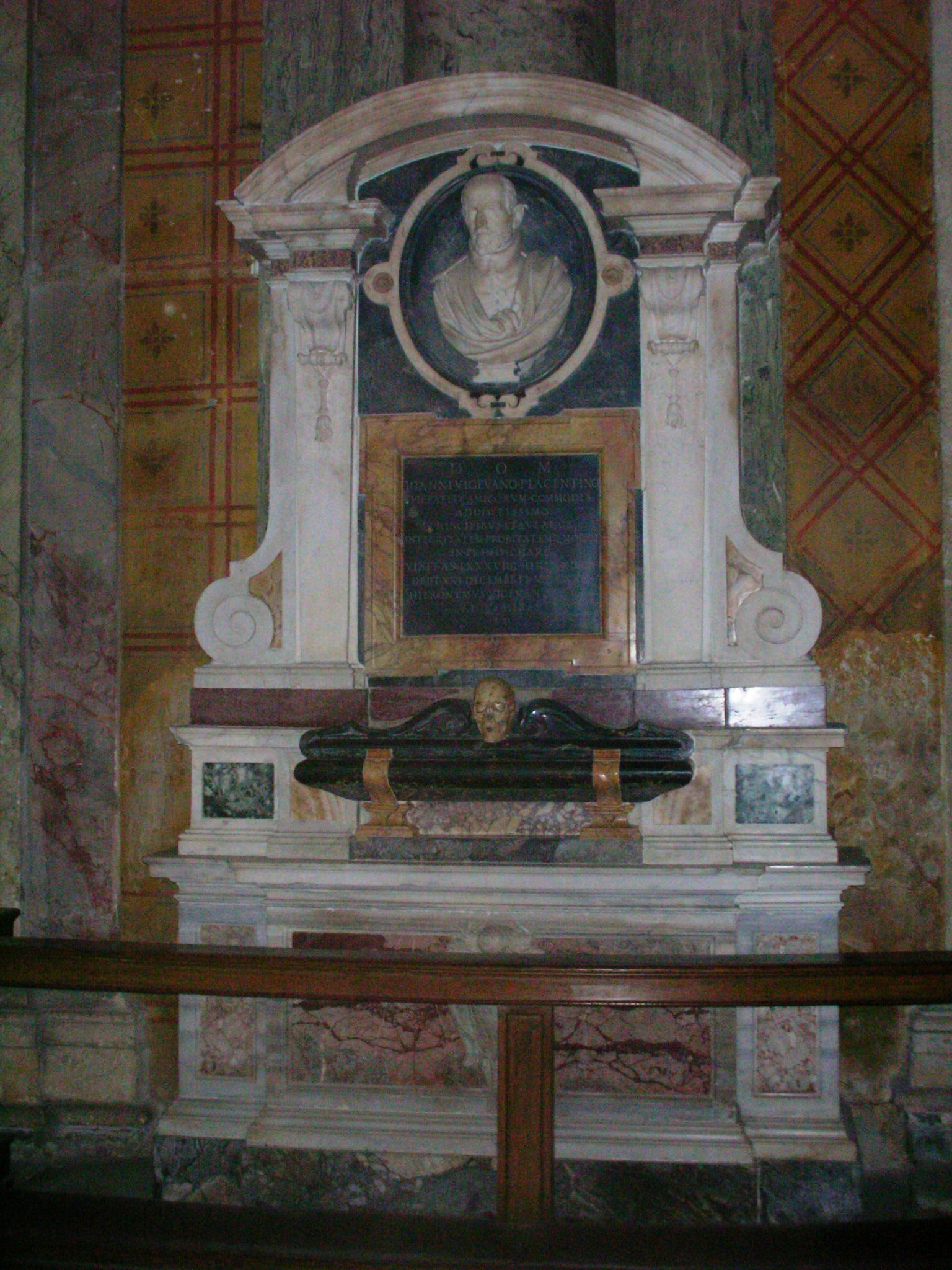
Tomb of Giovanni Vigevano by Gian Lorenzo Bernini, 1618–1620

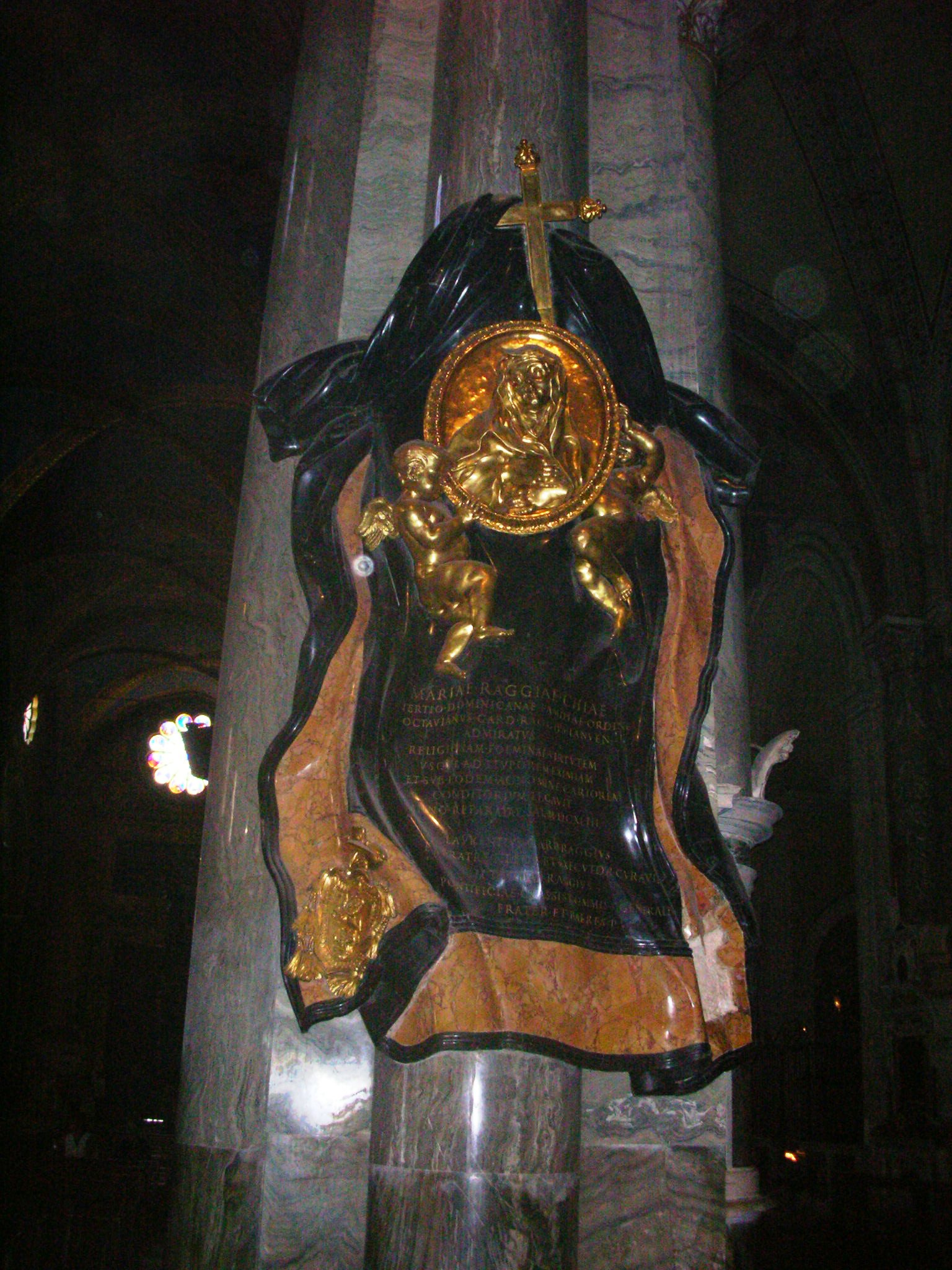
Memorial to Maria Raggi by Gian Lorenzo Bernini, 1647–1653

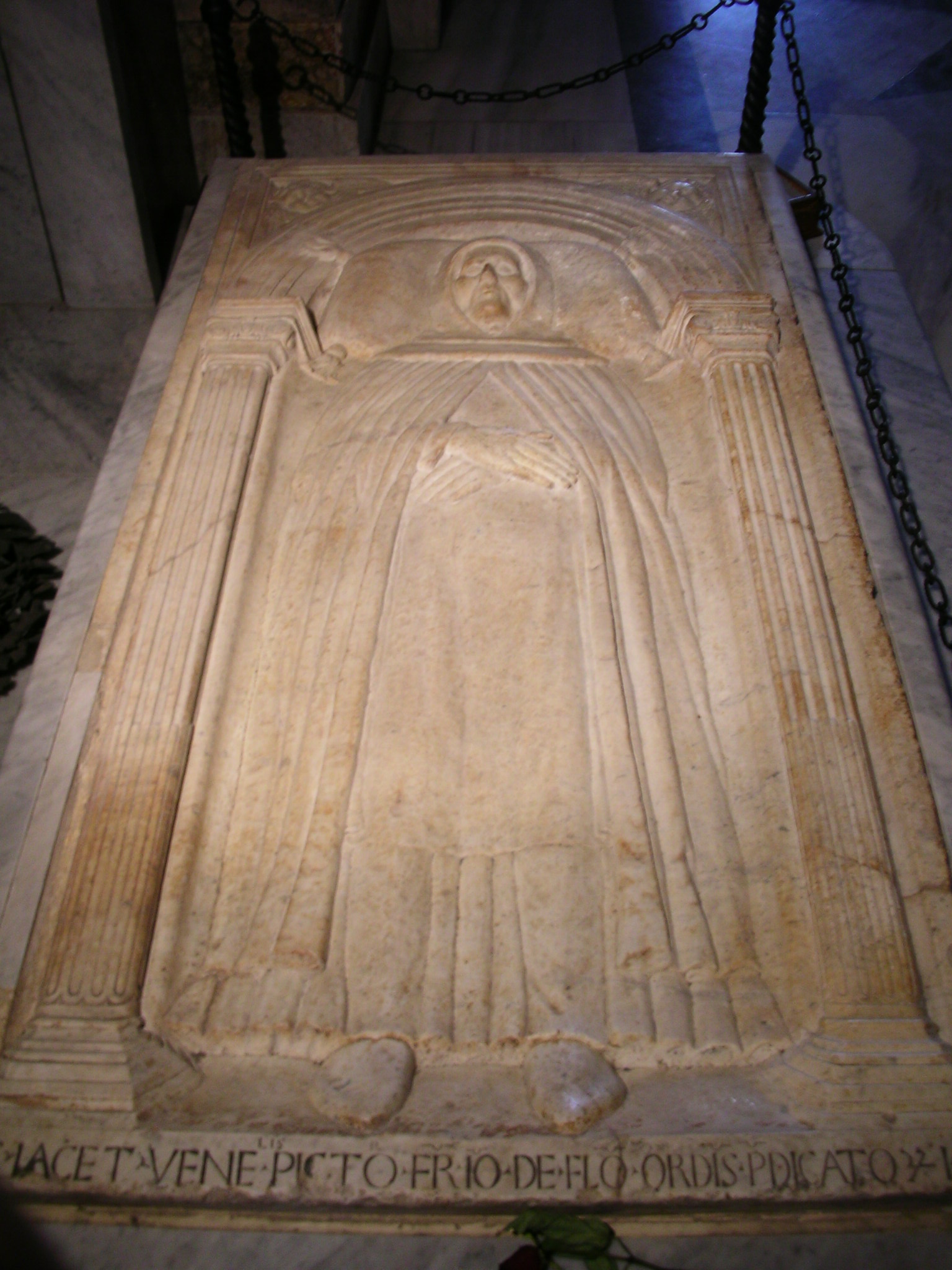
Tomb of Fra Angelico, by Isaia da Pisa, 1455

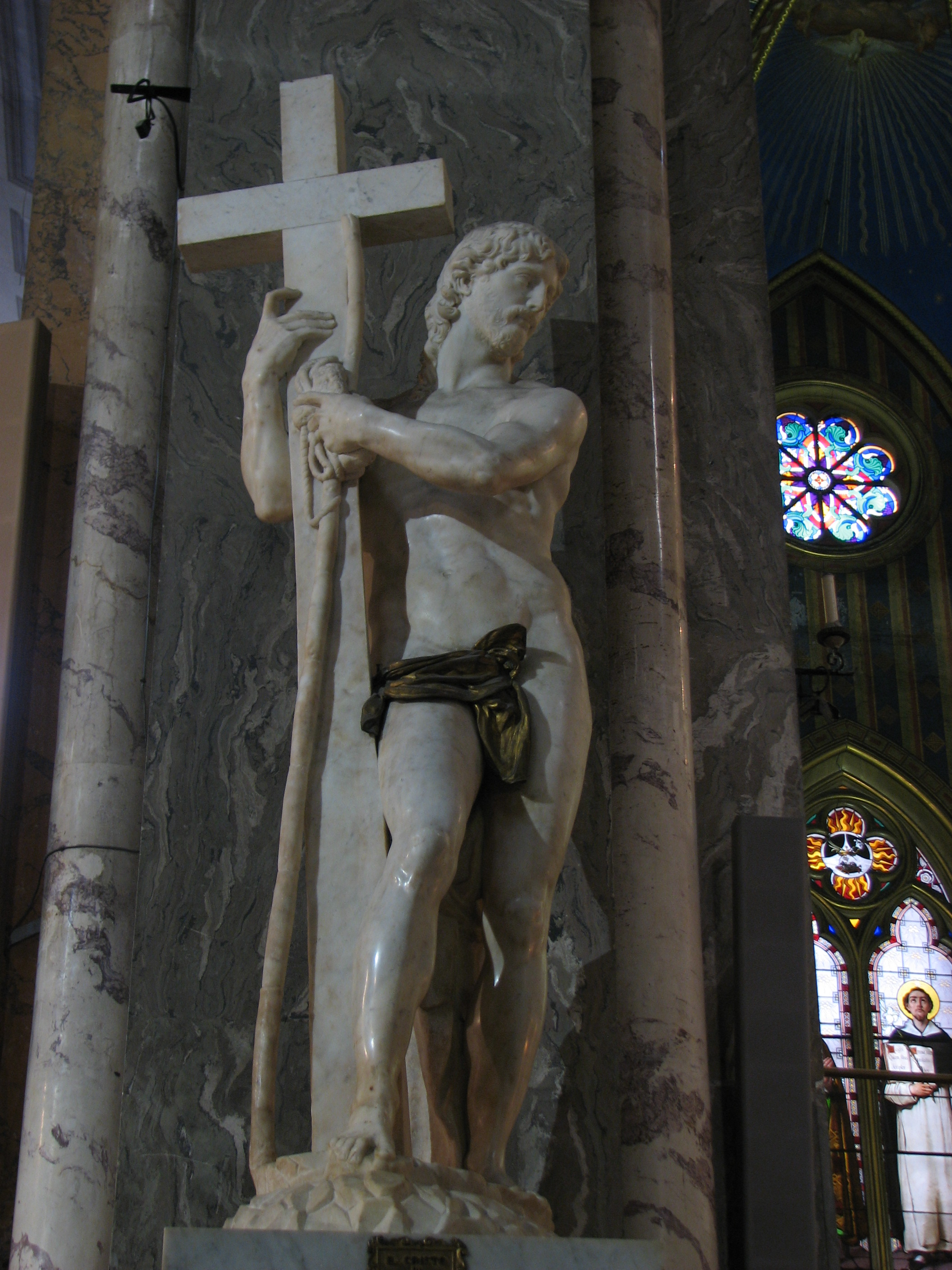
Cristo della Minerva by Michelangelo, 1519–1520

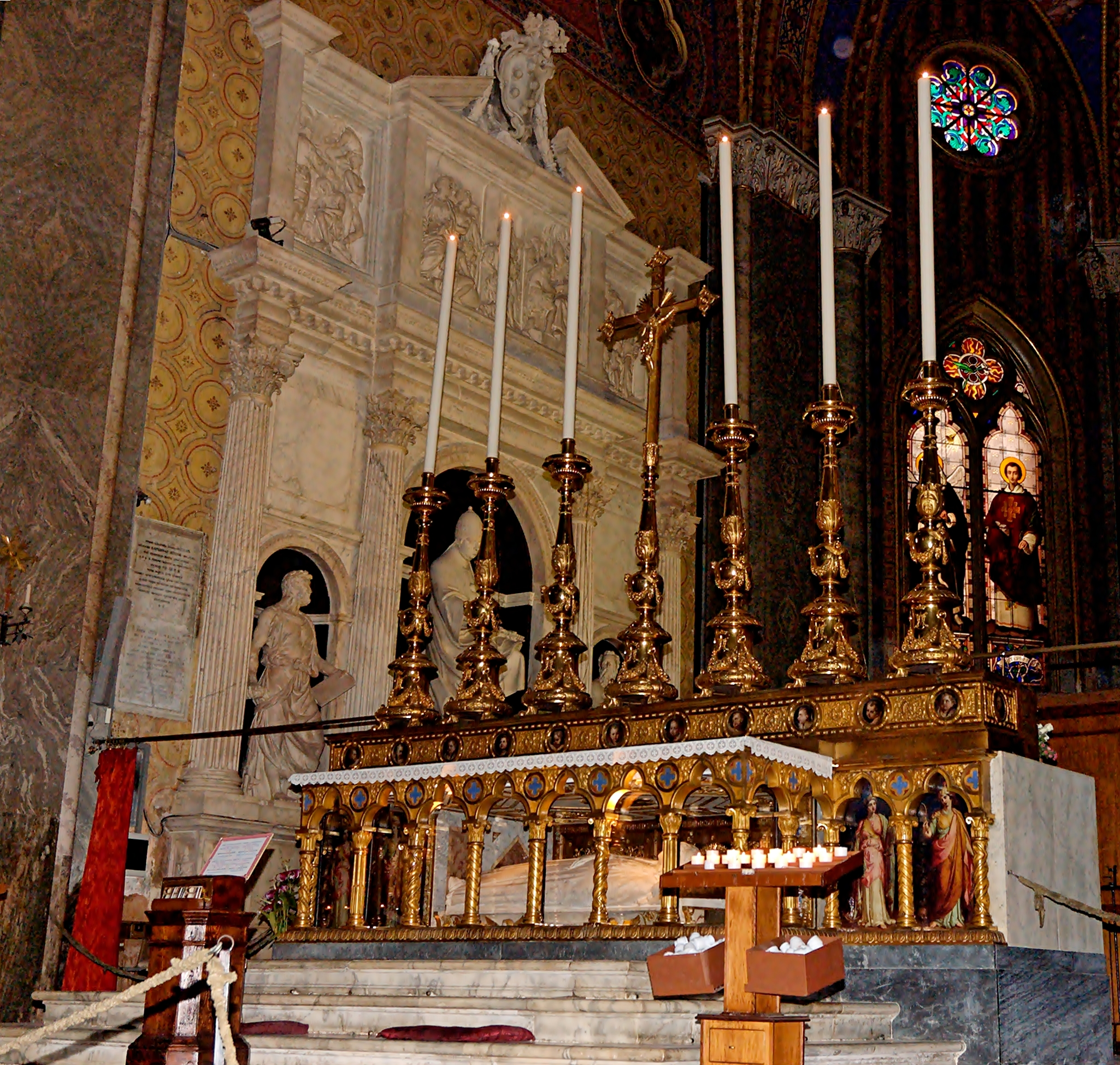
High Altar

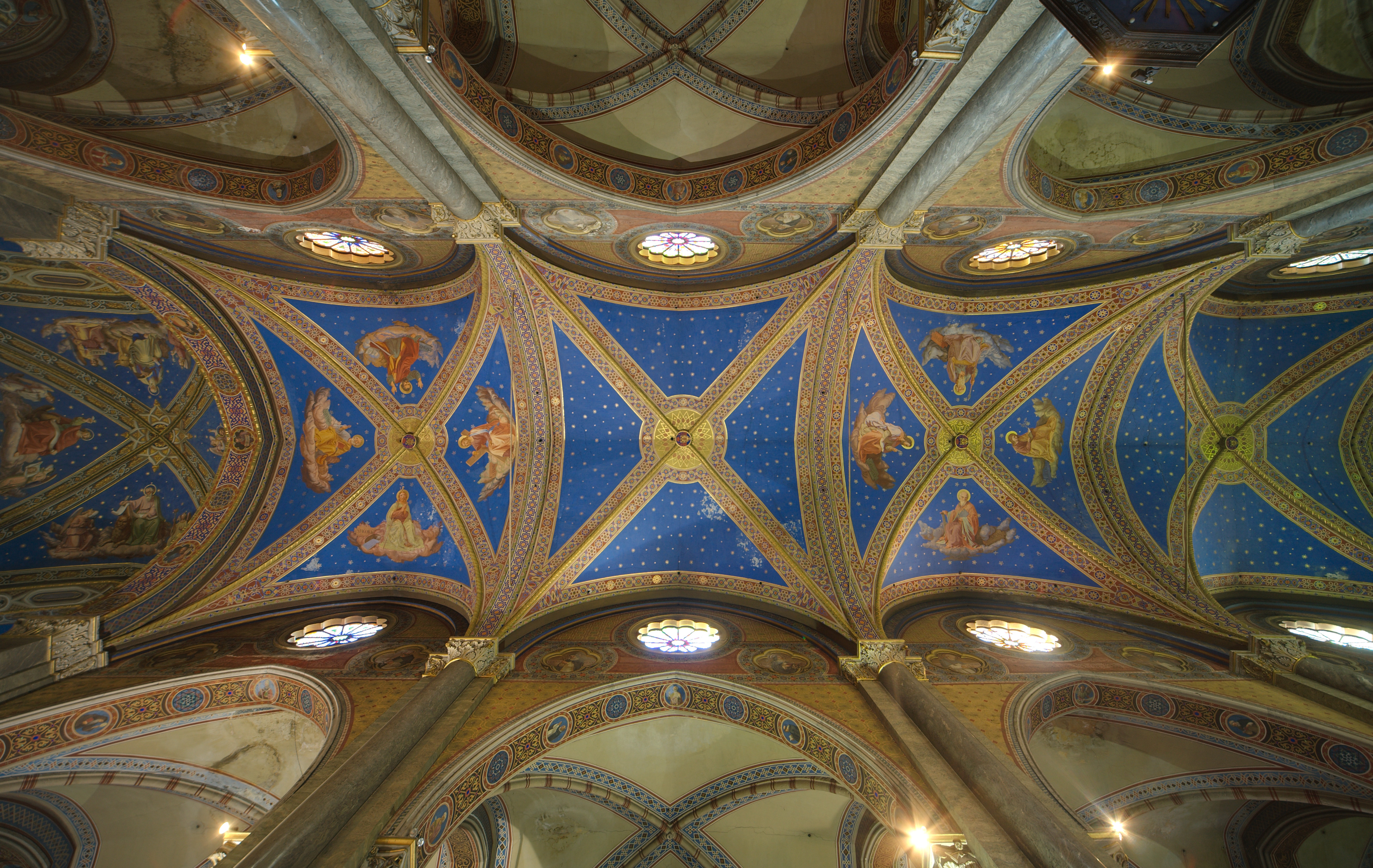
Vault

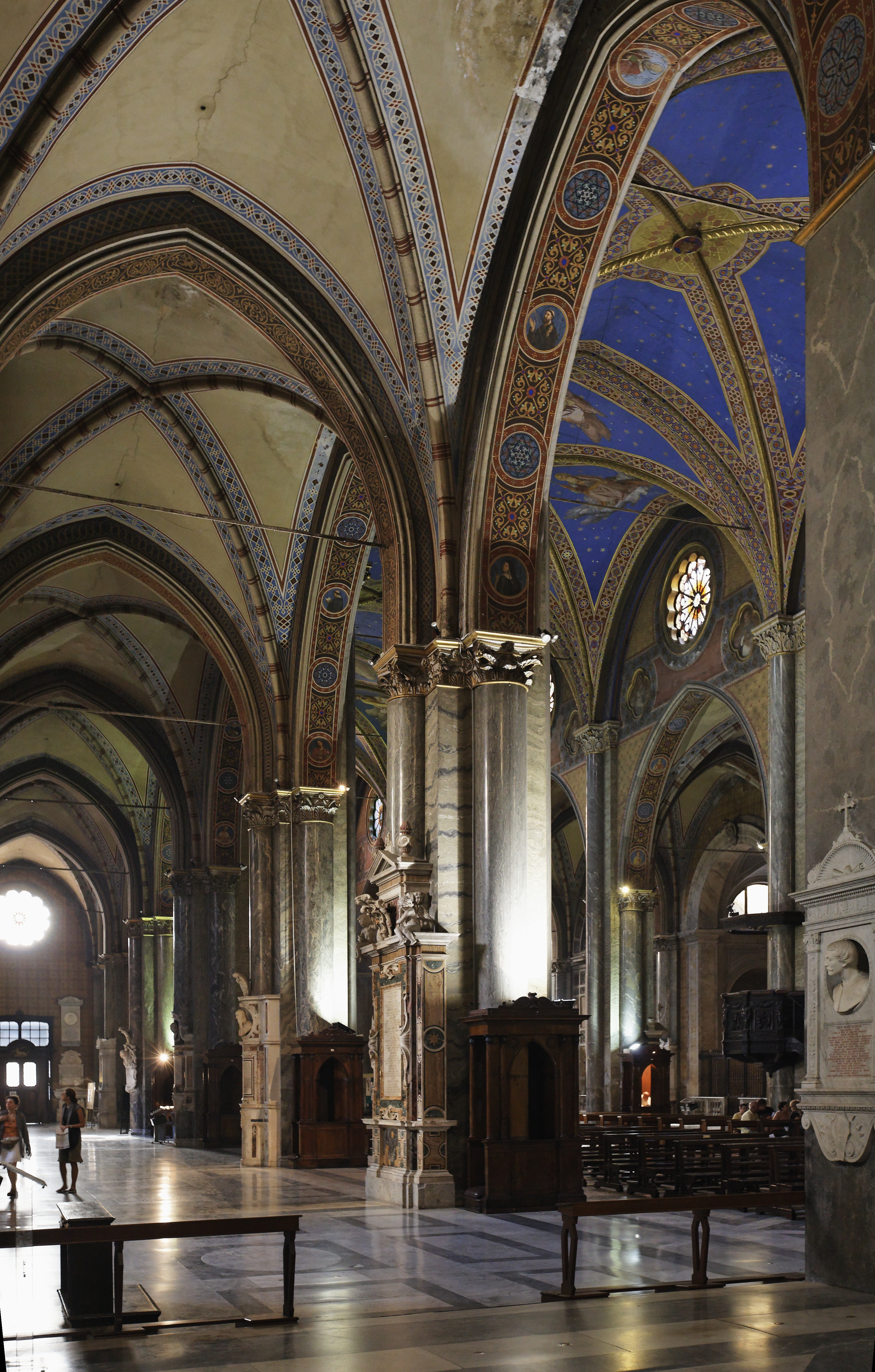
Basilica interior

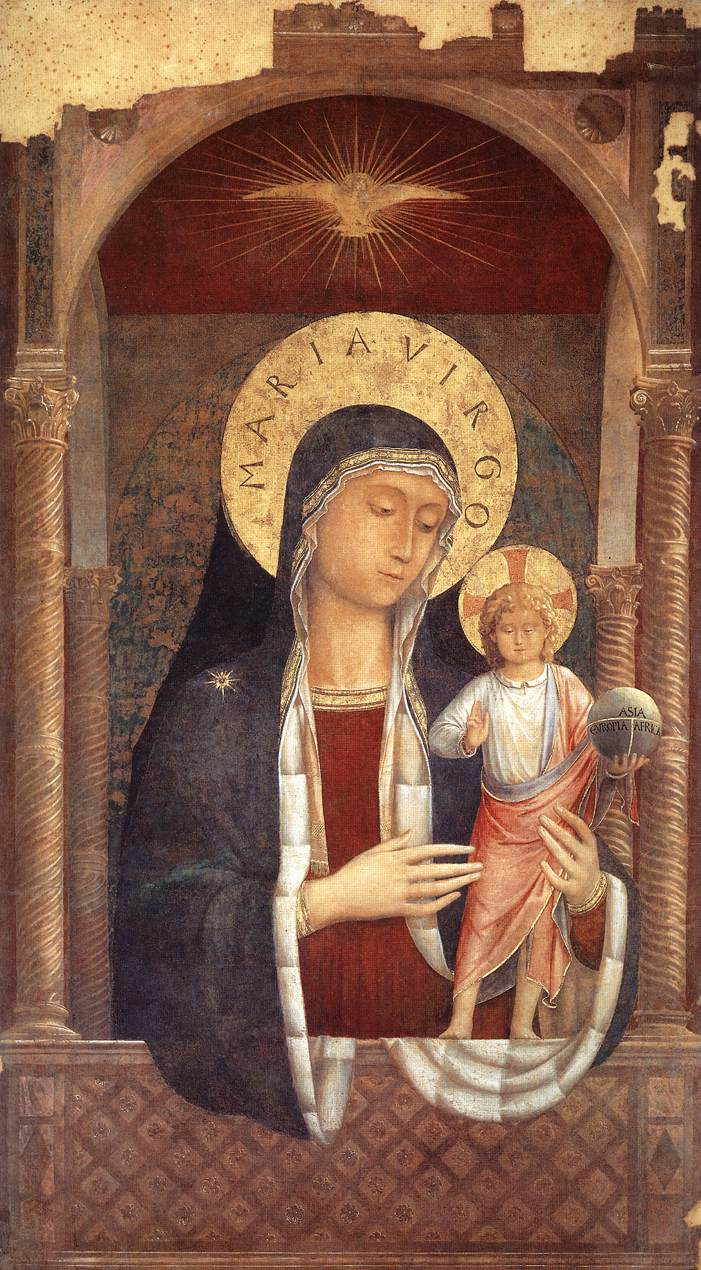
Madonna and Child Giving Blessings by Benozzo Gozzoli, 1449

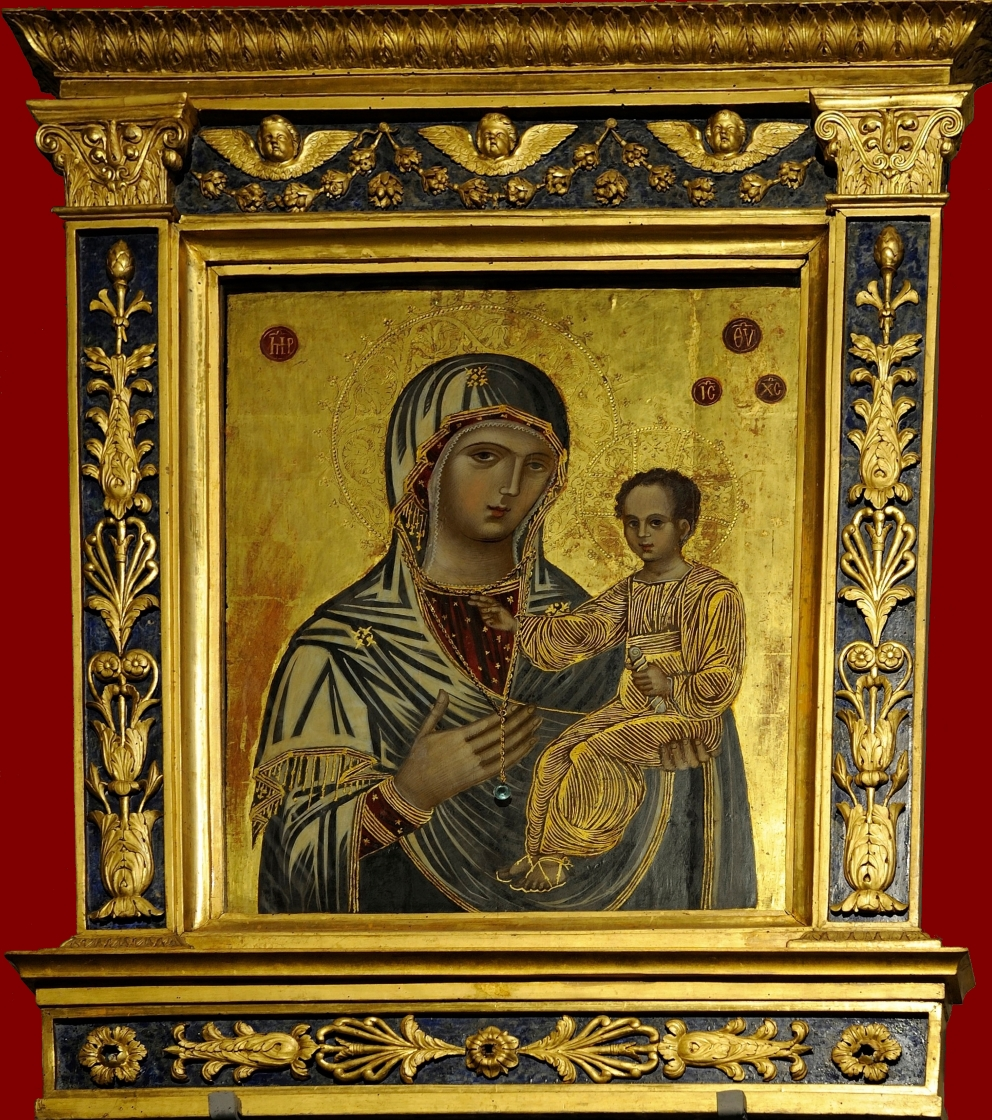
Icon of Our Lady of the Holy Rosary, crowned by the Vatican Chapter in 1640 as authorized by Pope Urban VIII

== See also ==
- Roman Catholic Marian churches

Preceded by Santa Maria del Popolo	Landmarks of Rome; Santa Maria sopra Minerva	Succeeded by Santa Maria in Trastevere
