= Women in post-classical warfare =

Aspect of women's history

A variety of roles were played by women in post-classical warfare. Only women active in direct warfare, such as warriors, spies, and women who actively led armies are included in this list. James Illston says,

"the field of medieval gender studies is a growing one, and nowhere is this expansion more evident than the recent increase in studies which address the roles of medieval women in times of war....this change in research has been invaluable".

Illston provided an exhaustive bibliography of recent scholarly books and articles, most of them connected to the crusades.

== Timeline ==
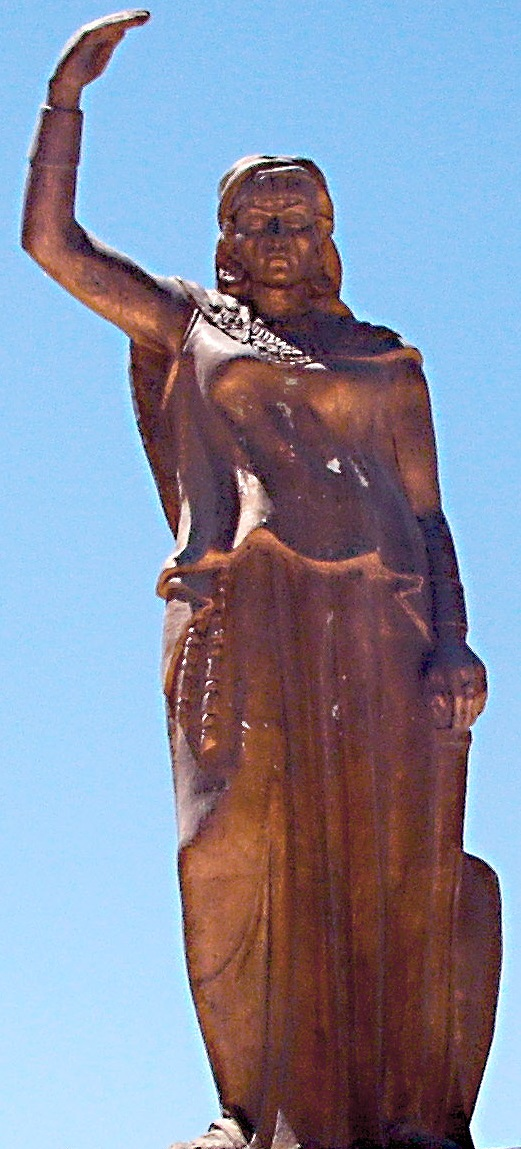
Dihya

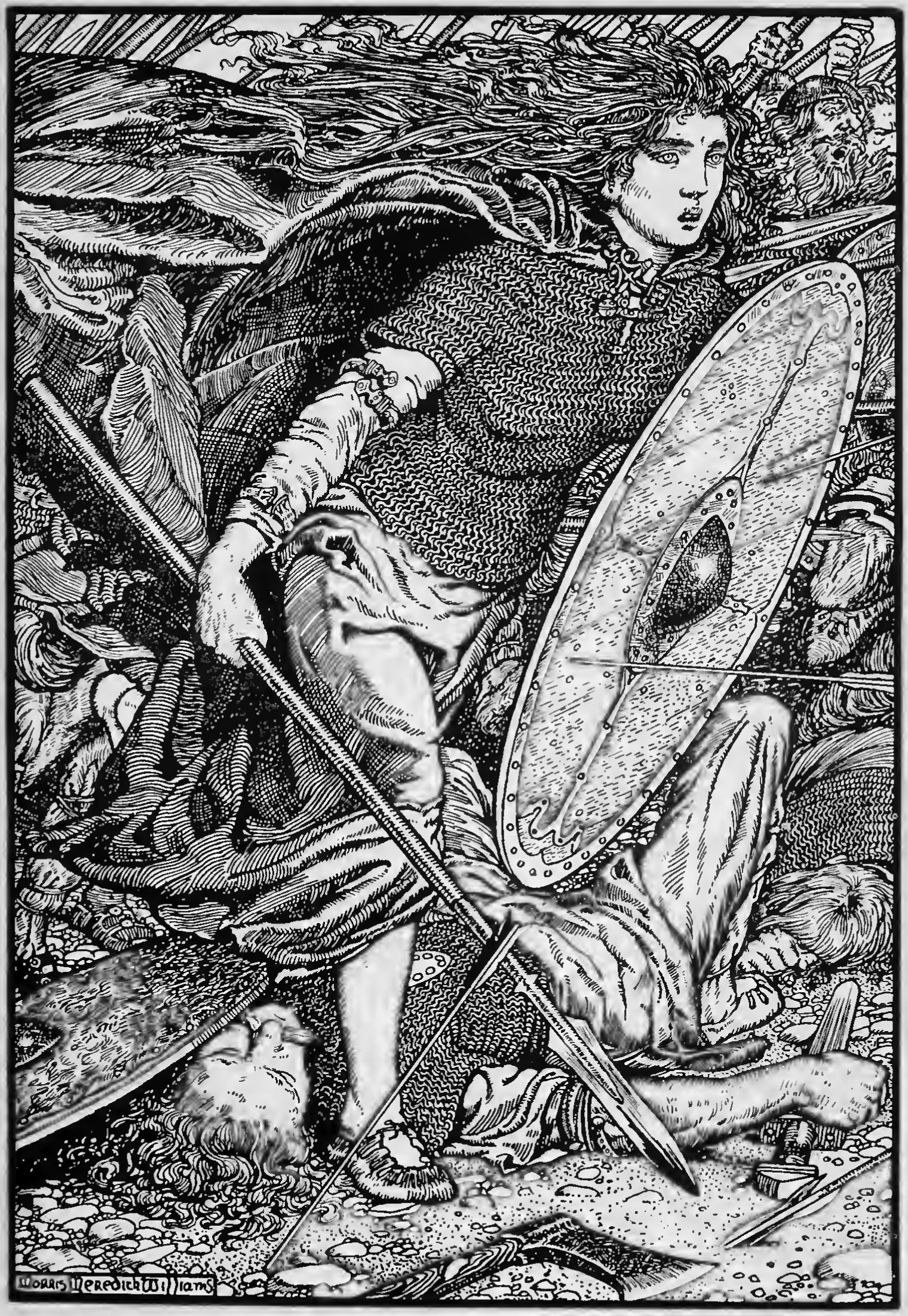
Lathgertha

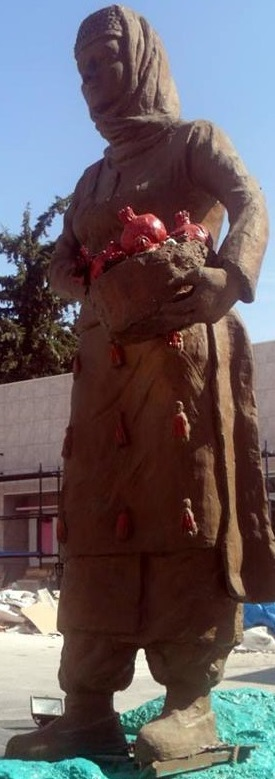
Gülnar Hatun

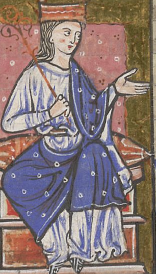
Æthelflæd

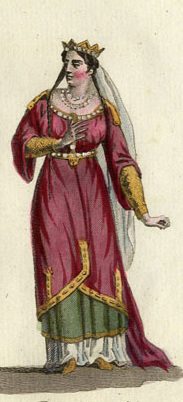
Adelaide-Blanche of Anjou

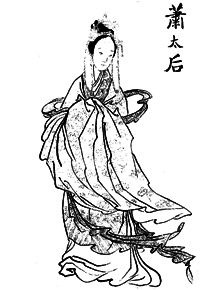
Empress Xiao Yanyan

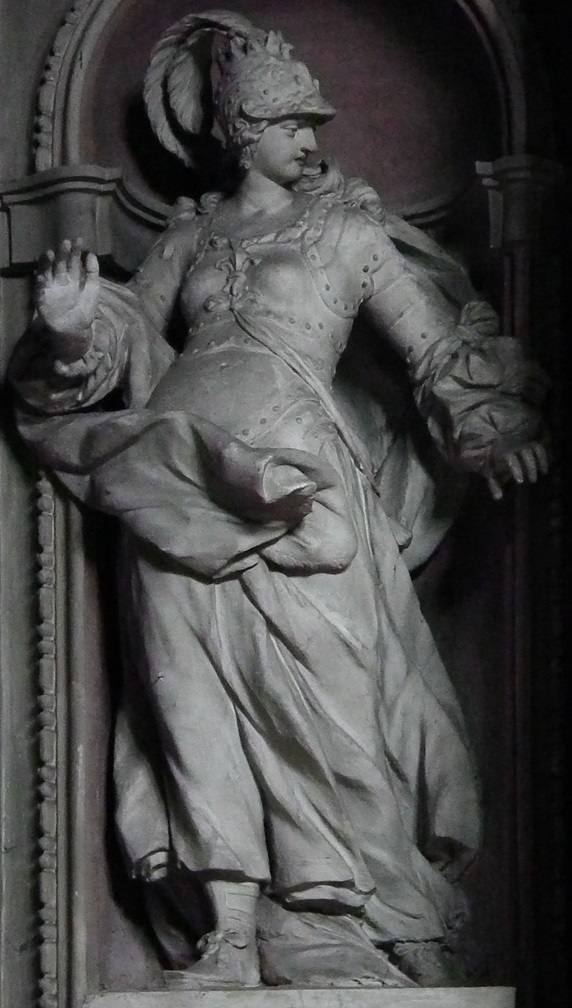
Matilda of Tuscany

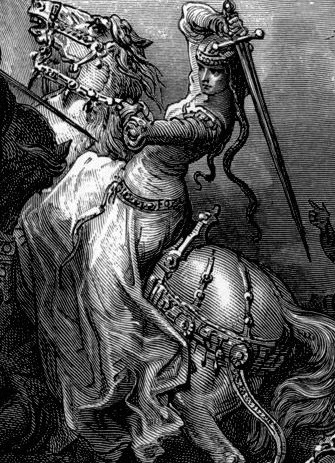
Florine of Burgundy

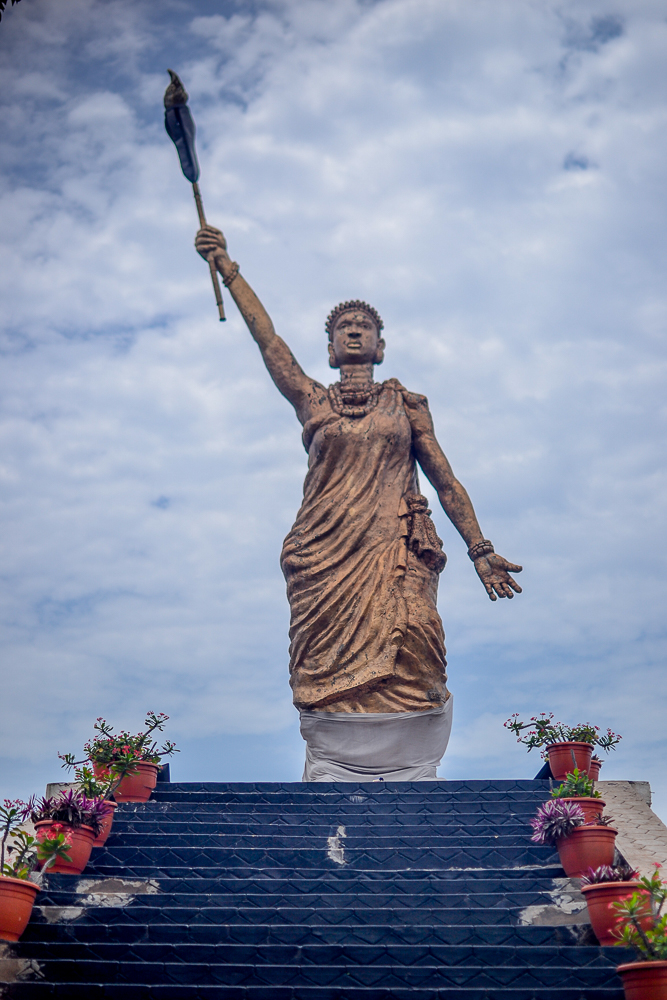
Moremi Ajasoro

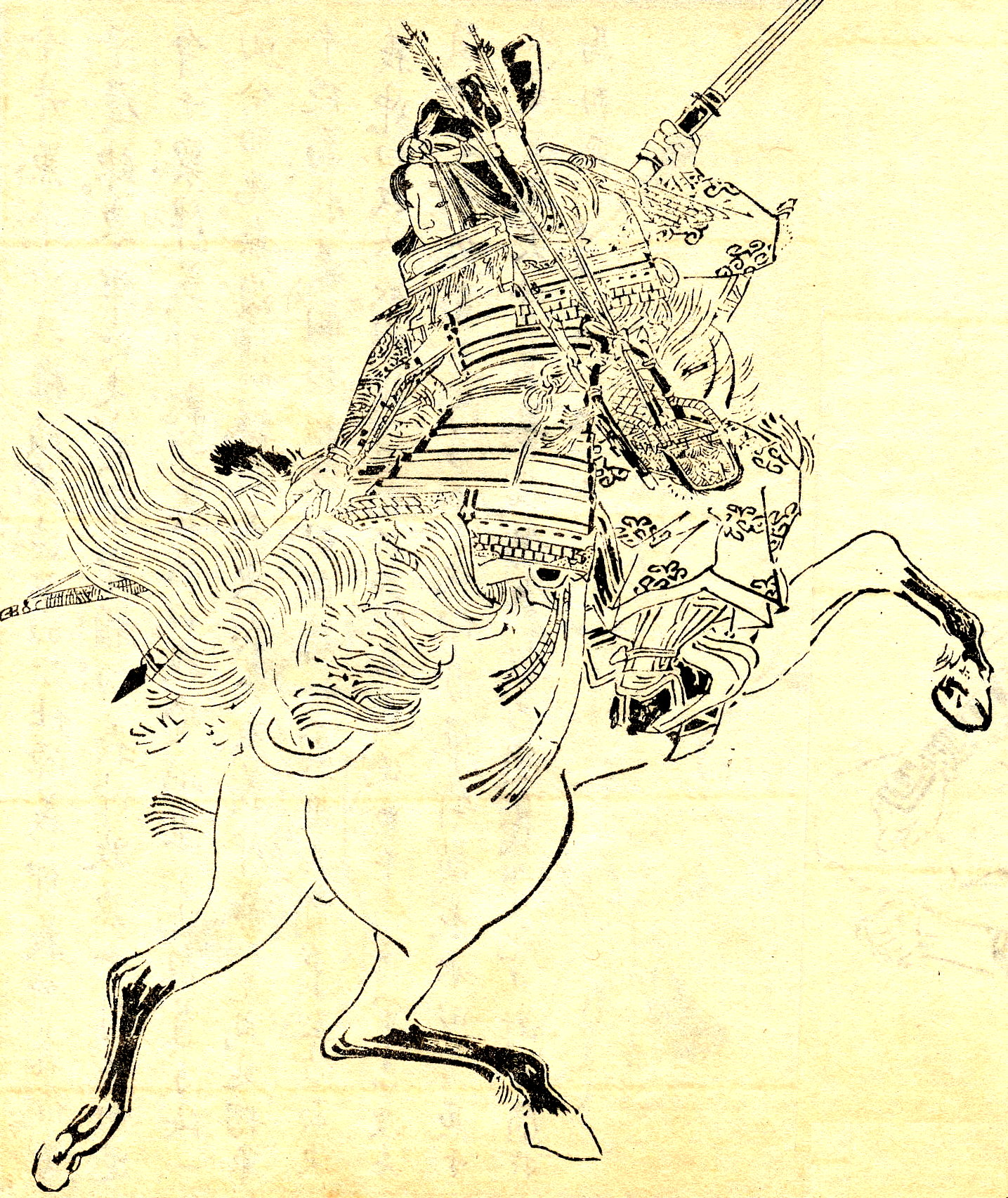
Tomoe Gozen

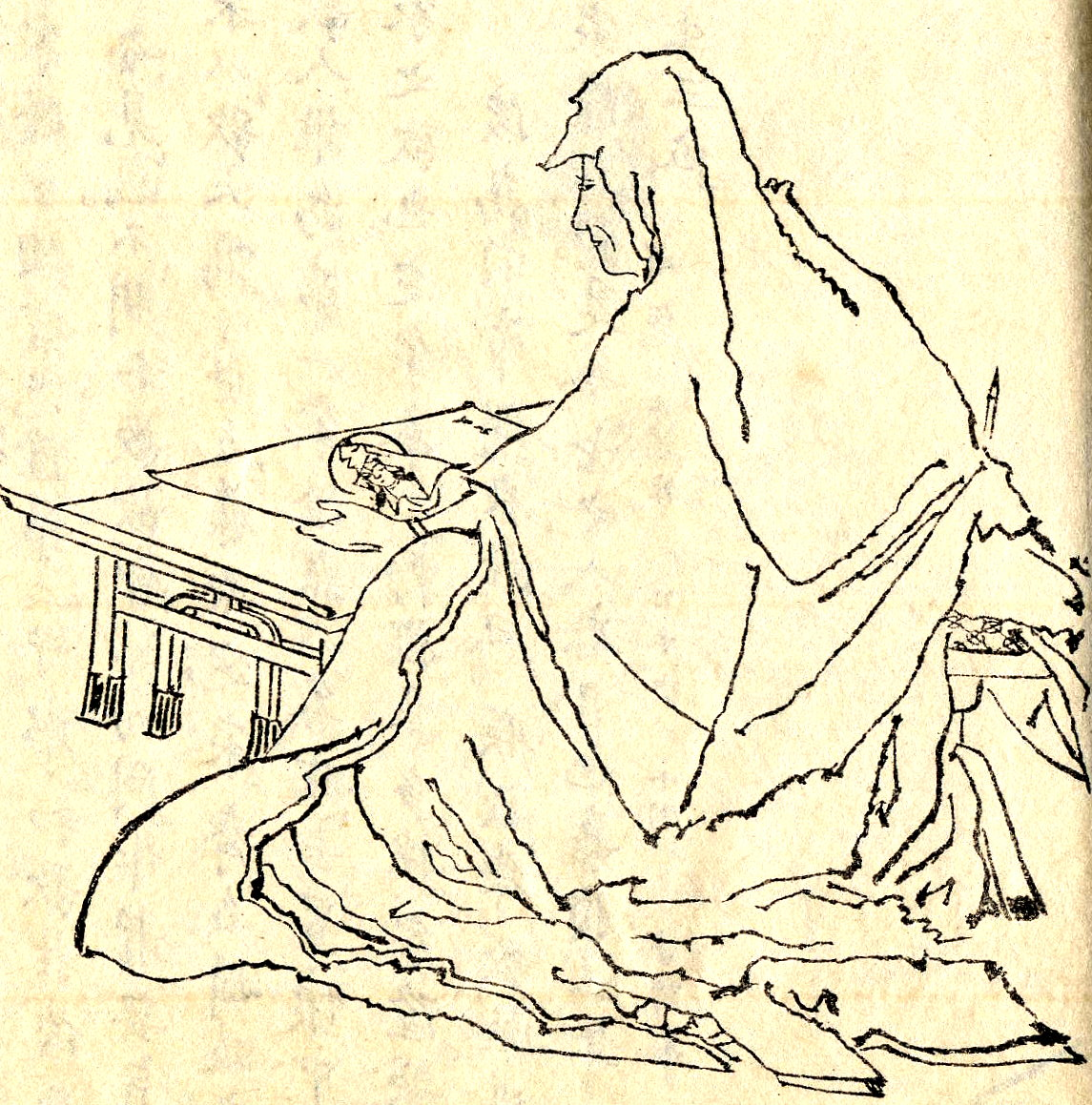
Hōjō Masako

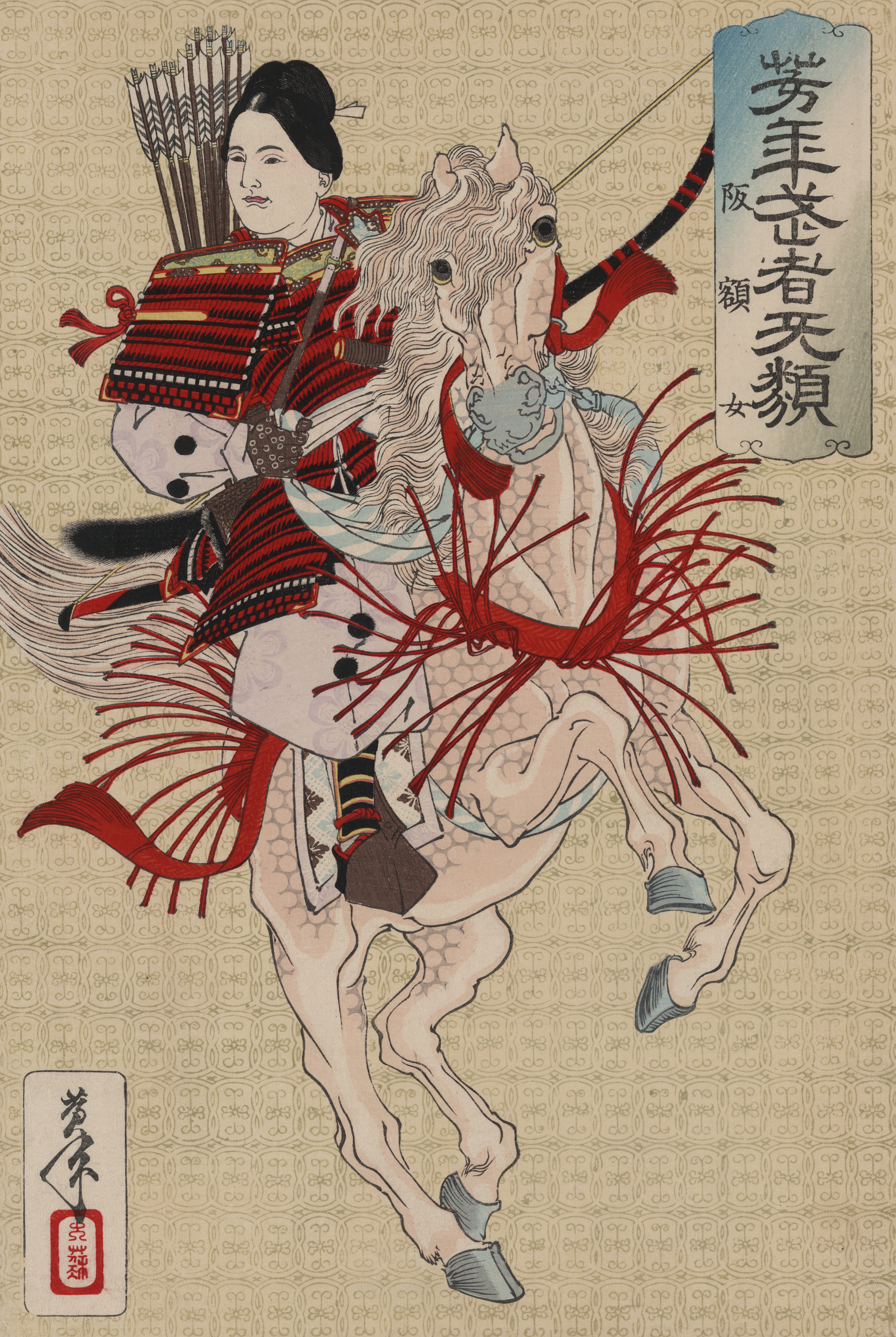
Hangaku Gozen

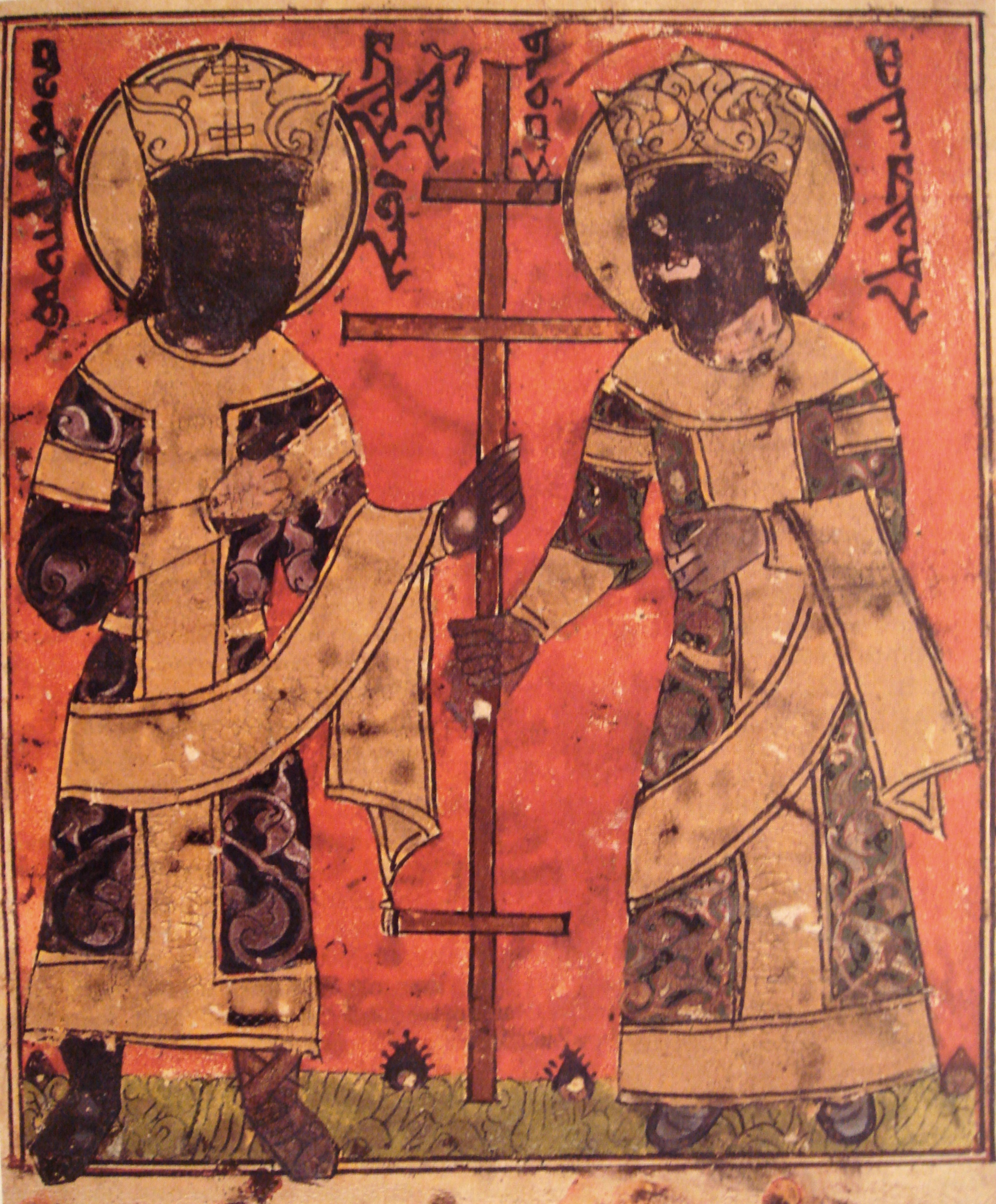
Hulagu Khan with Doquz Khatun

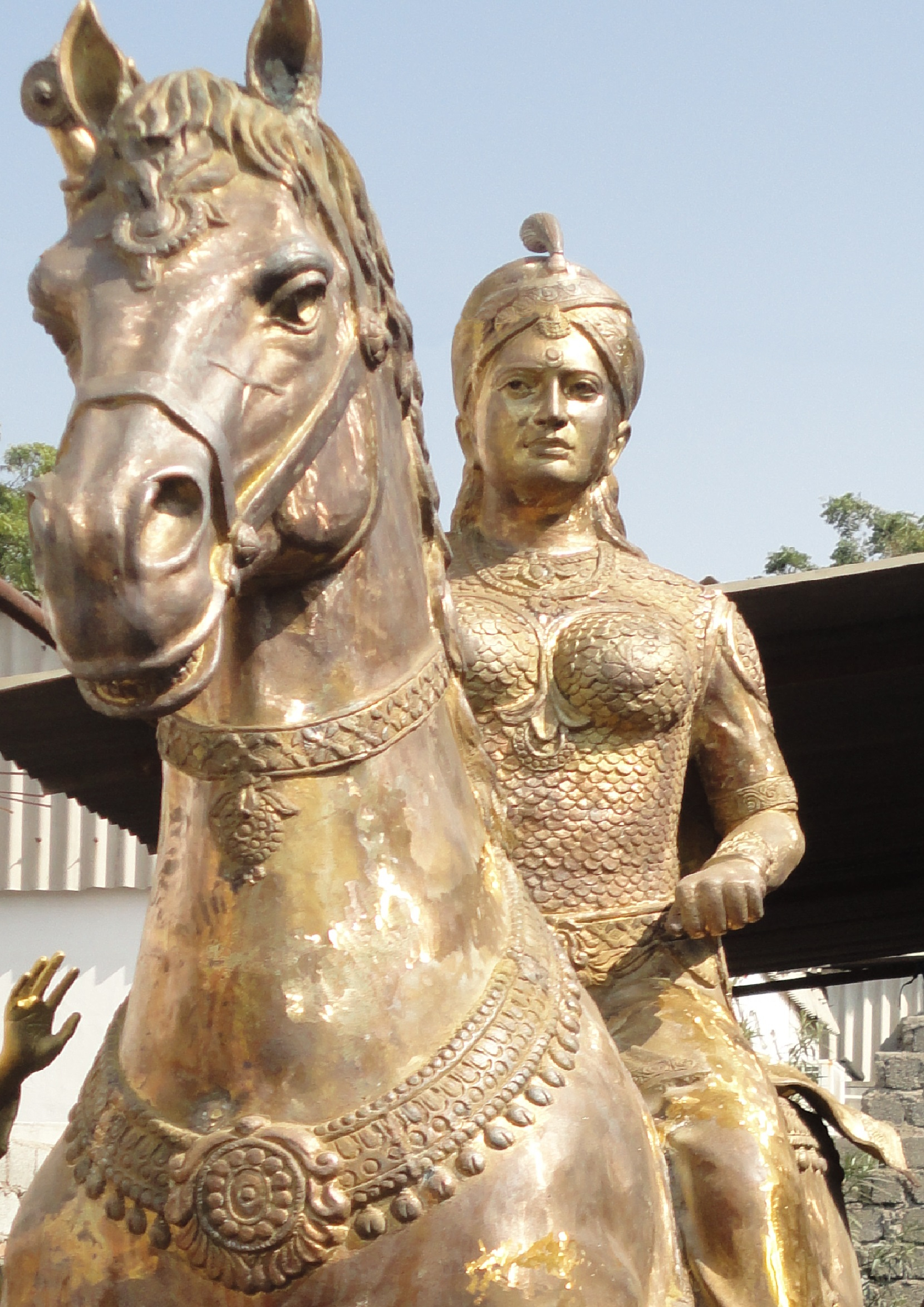
Rudrama Devi

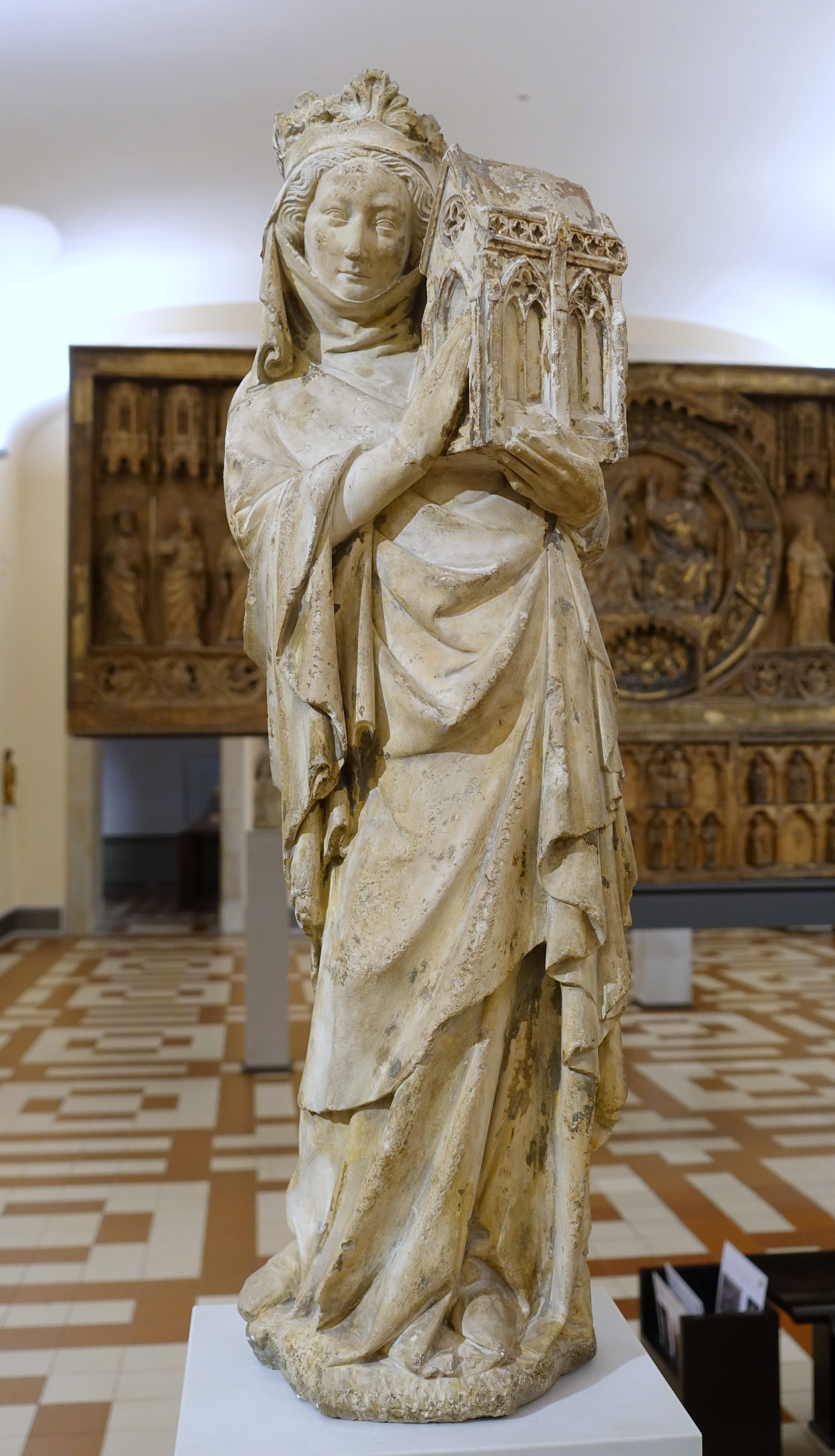
Joan I of Navarre

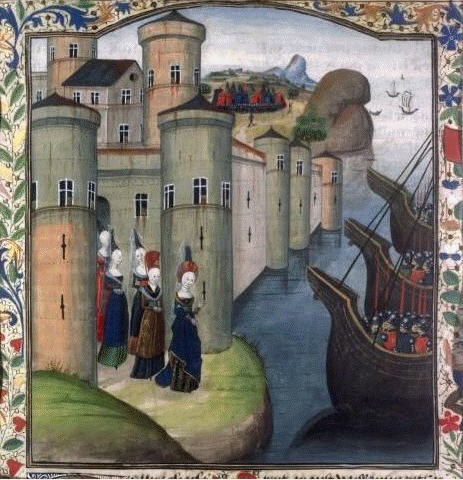
Joanna of Flanders

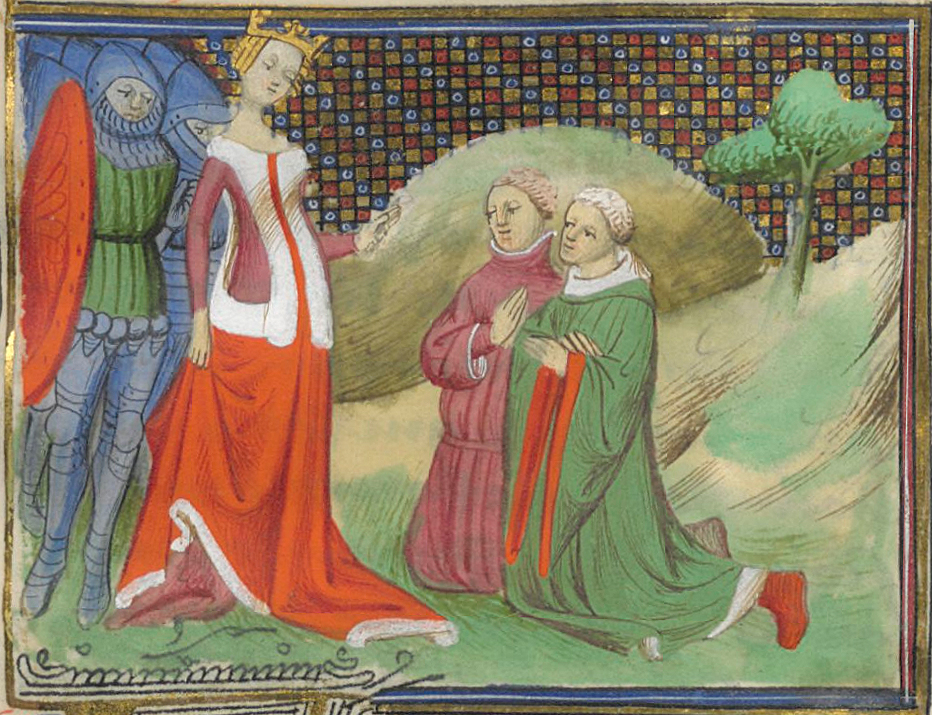
Isabella of France

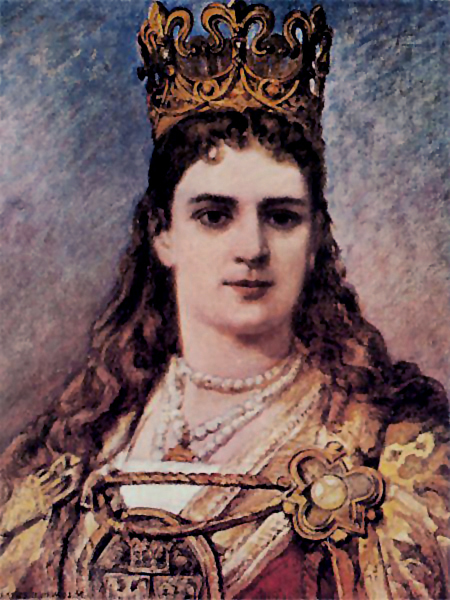
Jadwiga of Poland

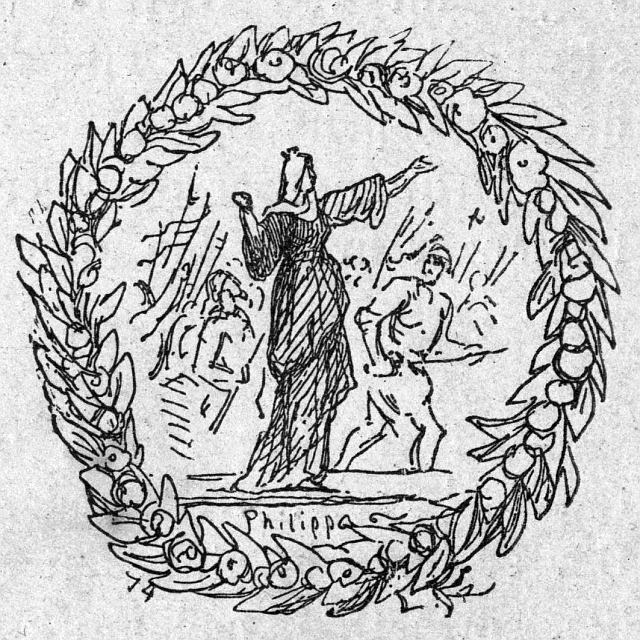
Philippa of England commands the defenders of Copenhagen (1428)

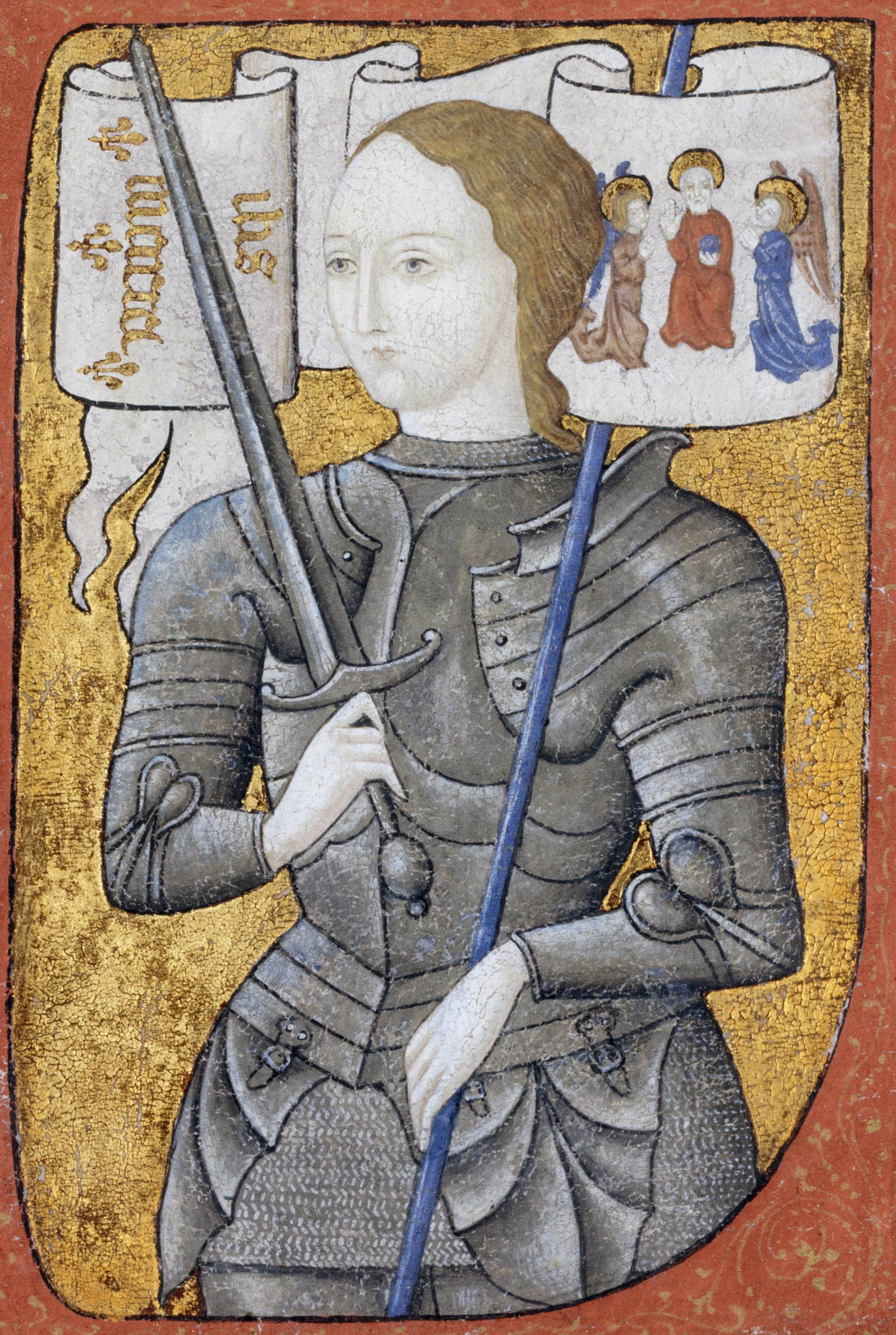
Joan of Arc

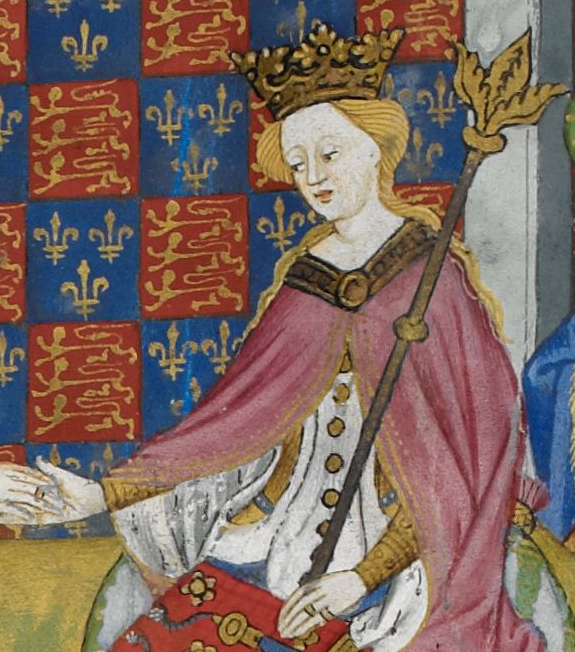
Margaret of Anjou

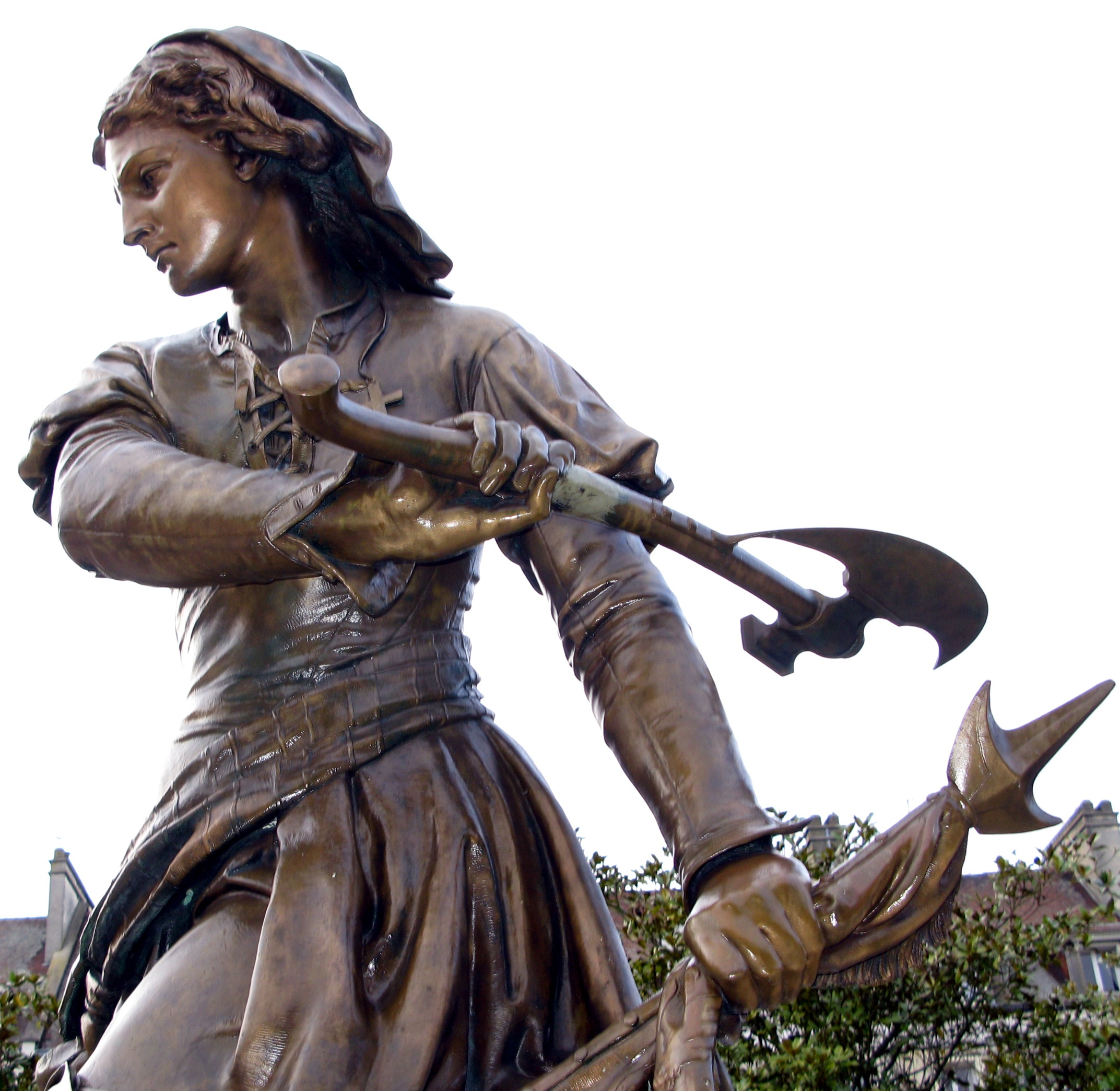
Jeanne Hachette

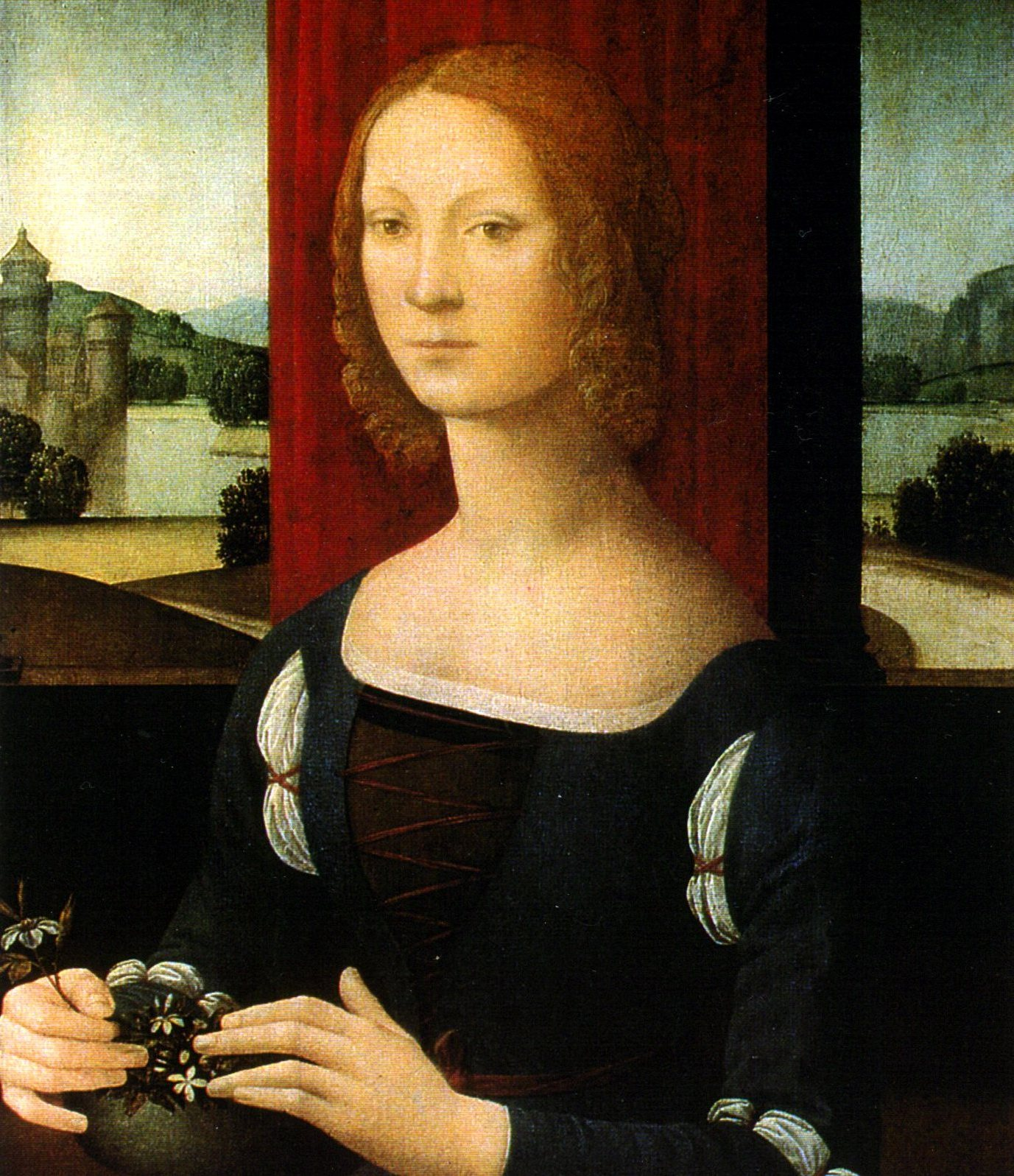
Caterina Sforza

The antiquity ended with the 5th century, and the list therefore starts with the 6th century.

=== 6th century ===
- 6th century: A Saxon woman is buried with a knife and a shield in Lincolnshire, England.
- 6th century: Lady Xian personally leads her army in China.
- 6th century: Halima, a Ghassanid princess, assisted the warriors of her tribe in the battle of Yawm Halima.
- 6th century: Amalafrida leads a revolt.
- 589: The royal nuns Basina, daughter of Chilperic I, and Clotilda rebel and take power in the city of Poitiers by the use of an army of criminals.

=== 7th century ===
- 7th century (before 637): Life of Mo Chua of Balla. The account of his life describe him as converting two violent "Amazons" named Bee and Lithben.
- 617–618: Princess Pingyang of China helps overthrow the Sui dynasty by organizing an "Army of the Lady".
- 624–625: Battle of Badr. Qurayshi Arab priestess Hind bint Utba leads her people against Muhammad in the fight. Her father, uncle, and brother are killed. She was among fifteen women accompanying troops in a battle near Medina, singing songs to inspire warriors. She exults over the body of the man who killed her father, chews his liver, and makes jewelry from his skin and nails.
- 625: Nusaybah bint Ka'ab fights in the Battle of Uhud on behalf of Muhammad after converting to Islam. Hammanah bint Jahsh also participated in the Battle of Uhud and provided water to the needy, and treated the wounded and injured. Umm Sulaym bint Milhan entered the battle carrying a dagger in the folds of her dress, and tended to the wounded. She also made attempts to defend Muhammad when the tide of the battle turned against him.
- 627: Umm Sulaym bint Milhan participates in the Battle of the Trench carrying a dagger in her robes. When Muhammad asked her what she was doing with it, she informed him that she planned to use it to fight deserters.
- 630s: Ghazala leads troops in battle.
- 630s: Khawla bint al-Azwar participate actively in combat during the Battle of Adnajin dressed as a man along with several other women, takes command of the Rashidun army at the Battle of Yarmouk against the Roman Byzantine Empire. She was nearly beaten by a Byzantine Greek when one of her female companions, Wafayra, beheaded her opponent with one blow. This act rallied the Arabs and they defeated the Greeks.
- 632: Prophetess Sajah, a contemporary of Muhammad, led an army of 4,000 against Medina after his death, but called off the attack when she learned of the defeat of Tulayha.
- 634: Umm Hakim bint al-Harith ibn Hisham single-handedly disposed of seven Byzantine soldiers with a tent pole during the Battle of Marj al-Saffar.
- 640s–741: Wak Chanil Ajaw rules the Mayans. She led military campaigns to conquer neighboring cities.
- 651: Female Sasanian generals like Apranik, Negan and Azedeh fight against the Muslim conquest of Persia.
- 653: Chen Shuozhen leads a peasant rebellion in China, declaring herself empress regnant of China.
- 656: Aisha, widow of Muhammad, leads troops at the Battle of the Camel. She is defeated.
- 690s: Kahina leads Berber resistance against the Muslim conquest of the Maghreb.

=== 8th century ===
- 8th to 11th century (Viking Age): Sagas and historical records tell of Viking shield-maidens participating in battles and raids, such as Veborg in the Battle of Brávellir in 750, and Lagertha. In addition, remains of a Birka Viking warrior were confirmed in 2017 by DNA analysis to be female.
- 722: Queen Æthelburg of Wessex destroys the town of Taunton.
- 730: A Khazar noblewoman named Parsbit commands an army against Armenia.
- 738: According to legendary Czech history, Valasca seized power and created a state ruled by women. She decreed that only women were to receive military training and that boys were to be maimed to render them unable to fight by removal of the right eye and thumb. She supposedly distributed a potion to the women of Bohemia which protected them from men.
- 741: A Byzantine Roman army attacks the Umayyad province of Melitene. With most of the garrison depleted or absent, the Arab women of the town mounted the walls, armed and wearing turbans, deterring the Romans from attempting a siege.
- 769: Gülnar Hatun, a semi-legendary Turkish heroine, is killed fighting the Abbasids.

=== 9th century ===
- 811: After suffering great losses, Khan Krum mobilizes the women of the Bulgars, who then take part in the Battle of Pliska.
- 816–837: Banu, wife of Babak Khorramdin, resists against the Islamic Abbasid Caliphate.
- 880: Ermengard of Italy conducts the defense of Vienne until forced to surrender in September 882.

=== 10th century ===
- 10th-century: A Birka female Viking warrior is buried in Birka, Sweden; she were confirmed in 2017 by DNA analysis to be female.
- 10th-century: According to legend, Saint Theodora of Vasta, in Arcadia of Peloponnesus, joined the army of Byzantine Empire in her father's stead dressed as a man, to spare her father from conscription, and had no brother who could take his place: when refusing to marry a woman who claimed to have been made pregnant by her, she is executed, resulting in the discovery of the biological gender of her corpse, and her status as a saint for the sacrifice she made for her father.
- 900: A Viking woman is buried in Solør, Norway with weapons.
- 912–922: Reign of Æthelflæd, queen of Mercia. She commanded armies, fortified towns, and defeated the Danes. She also defeated the Welsh and forced them to pay tribute to her.
- 914: Queen Sugandha and her forces marched against the Tantrins. She was defeated and deposed.
- 916: Xochitl, a Toltec queen, fights in a civil war that erupted in the Toltec Empire. She created and led a battalion made up entirely of women soldiers.
- 960: Ethiopian queen Gudit laid waste to Axum and its countryside, destroyed churches and monuments, and attempted to exterminate the members of the ruling dynasty of the Kingdom of Aksum.
- 971: Sviatoslav I attacked the Byzantine Empire in Bulgaria in 971. When the Varangians were defeated in the siege of Dorostolon, the victors were stunned to discover shieldmaidens among the fallen warriors.
- 975: Adelaide-Blanche of Anjou, acting for her sons Guy and Bertrand, led an army to aid Guy (a.k.a. Guido II), Count-Bishop of le Puy, in establishing the Peace and Truce of God in le Puy.
- 986: The Khitan Dowager Regent Xiao Yanyan of the Khitan Liao state, regnal title Chengtian, assumes power at age 30 in 982. In 986, she personally led her own army against the Song dynasty and defeated them in battle.

=== 11th century ===
- Early 11th century: Freydís Eiríksdóttir, a Viking woman, sails to Vinland with Thorfinn Karlsefni. When she faced hostile natives while pregnant, she exposed her breasts and beat her chest with a sword. This caused the natives to run away.
- 11th century: Great Saxon Revolt. Adelaide of Savoy, Duchess of Swabia, remains in Swabia to defend her husband's lands.
- 11th century: Judith d'Évreux is left in the care of Roger I of Sicily's garrison while he campaigns.
- 1016: Adela of Hamaland defend the fortress Uplade in the Netherlands in the absence of her spouse, and fills out the ranks of her defense force with women dressed as soldiers.
- 11th century: Sikelgaita commands troops in her own right.
- 1047: Akkadevi, an Indian princess, besieges the fort of Gokage.
- 1050: Norwegian noblewoman Bergljot Håkonsdatter raises an army to kill the king for murdering her spouse and son: she takes the king's estate, but by then the king had managed to escape her.
- 1055: Defeat and execution of A Nong, Zhuang ruler, warrior, and shamaness. Alongside her son, father, and husband, she led the Zhuang and Nùng minorities of the Sino-Vietnamese frontier against Vietnamese and Chinese foes.
- 1058–1086: Sikelgaita of Salerno, second wife of Robert Guiscard, Duke of Apulia, accompanies her husband on military campaigns, and regularly puts on full armor and rides into battle at his side.
- October 14, 1066: Edith the Fair, according to folklore, identifies Harold Godwinson's body after the Battle of Hastings.
- 1071: Richilde, Countess of Hainaut is captured fighting in the Battle of Cassel.
- 1072: Urraca of Zamora, Infanta of the Kingdom of Castile, defends the city of Zamora against her brother, Sancho.
- 1087: Matilda of Tuscany personally leads a military expedition to Rome in an attempt to install Pope Victor, but the strength of the imperial counterattack soon convinced the pope to retire from the city.
- 1090: Norman woman Isabel of Conches rides on horseback, armed.
- 1097: Florine of Burgundy participates in the first crusade with her spouse, and fell participating in actual combat by his side while their army was attacked and destroyed in Anatolia.

=== 12th century ===
- 12th century: Moremi Ajasoro of the Yoruba is taken as a slave by the Igbo and married their ruler as his anointed queen. After familiarizing herself with the secrets of her new husband's army, she escaped to Ile-Ife and revealed this to the Yorubas, who were then able to subsequently defeat them in battle.
- 12th century: Yennenga of the Mossi people of Burkina Faso leads her own battalion.
- 1101: Ida of Formbach-Ratelnberg leads her own army in the Crusade of 1101.
- January 1108 or 1109: Bertha of Rheinfelden "fought manfully" in the Battle of Jedesheim.
- 1119: Clementia of Burgundy raises an army.
- 1121: Urraca of León fights her half-sister, Theresa, Countess of Portugal when she refuses to surrender the city of Tui, Pontevedra.
- 1130: Female Chinese general Liang Hongyu, wife of general Han Shizhong of the Song dynasty, blocks the advance of the Jin army with her husband. Her drumming invigorated the Song army and rallied them to defeat the Jin.
- 1136: Welsh princess Gwenllian ferch Gruffydd leads an army against the Normans but is defeated and killed.
- 1141: Matilda I, Countess of Boulogne raises an army to continue the fight for the crown of England, after her husband, King Stephen is captured by the Empress Matilda.
- 1145: Eleanor of Aquitaine accompanies her husband on the Second Crusade.
- 1147: Fannu, an Almoravid princess, participate in the defense of the Almoravid dynasty capital's fortress in Marrakech dressed as a man during the conquest of the Almohad jihad.
- 1170–1176: Aoife MacMurrough conducts battles in Ireland on behalf of her consort Richard de Clare, 2nd Earl of Pembroke and is sometimes known as "Red Eva".
- 1180–1185: Female Japanese warrior Tomoe Gozen fights in the Genpei War alongside men.
- 1172: Aldruda, Countess of Bertinoro commanded the army that fought to lift an imperial siege of the town of Aucona in 1172.
- 1182–1199: Hōjō Masako rides with her spouse Minamoto no Yoritomo on his campaigns and was never defeated in battle.
- 1178 : Indian queen Naikidevi, ruling on behalf of Mulraja II fights Muhammad Ghori in Mount Abu
- 1191–1217: Nicola de la Haye defended loyalist interests against rebel barons in Lincoln, England.
- 1198: Maud de Braose defends Plainscastle against Welsh attack.
- 1199: Joan of England, Queen of Sicily took arms against the lords of Saint-Felix, and laid siege to a castrum belonging to them known as Les Cassés.
- Late 12th-century: Umadevi, consort of King Veera Ballala II, commanded Mysore armies against the rival Chalukyas on at least two occasions, allowing Bellala to concentrate on administrative matters and thus significantly contributing to the Hoysalas' conquest of the Chalkyua at Kalyani (near present-day Bidar).

=== 13th century ===
- 1201: Japanese archer Hangaku Gozen defends a fort until she is wounded by an arrow.
- 1206: Swedish nobleman Jon Jarl are killed by Baltic pirates who attacks his estate Askenös after his return from the First Swedish Crusade, after which his widow, the Lady of Askanäs (her name is not preserved), flee to Hundhammar, gather an army and return to kill the murderers of her spouse.
- 1220s: Yang Miaozhen acts as war leader in China.
- 1221: The ruler of Maragha, Sulafa Khatun, successfully commands the citadel of Ru'in Diz during the Mongol siege of Maragha.
- 1226: Yesui, one of the wives of Genghis Khan accompanies her husband as he set out on a punitive expedition to the Tangut kingdom.
- 1236–1239: Reign of Razia Sultana. She led her troops in battle.
- January 1229: Blanche of Castile led her forces to attack Mauclerc.
- 1249: Magistra Hersend accompanied Louis IX of France on the Seventh Crusade.
- 1258: Doquz Khatun accompanies her husband Hulagu on campaigns. At the Sack of Baghdad in 1258, the Mongols massacred tens of thousands of inhabitants, but by the order of Doquz, the Christians were spared.
- 1261–1289: Reign of Indian queen Rudrama Devi. She leads her troops in battle, and may have been killed in battle in 1289.
- 1264: Eleanor of Provence raises troops in France for her husband during the Baron's War.
- 1270: Eleanor of Castile accompanies her husband on his crusade. According to legend, she saved his life by sucking poison from his wound when he was injured.
- 1271: Isabella of Aragon, Queen of France dies at Cosenza on the way back from the Crusades.
- August 1282: Dina and Clarenza assist in repelling a siege of Messina.
- 1285: Mercadera, dressed as a man, wounds and captures a French knight during the French siege of the Catalan city of Peralada.
- 1290: Royal Armouries Ms. I.33 is written. It depicts fighters. An illustration of a woman named Walpurgis training in sword and buckler techniques is in the manuscript among others.
- 1296: Bertha van Heukelom defends Castle IJsselstein against Hubrecht van Vianen of Culemborg
- 1297: Joan I of Navarre, Countess of Champagne, leads an army against the Count of Bar when he invaded her domain of Champagne.
- Late 13th century: Khutulun, a relative of Kublai Khan, is described as a superb warrior and accompanies her father Khaidu on military campaigns.

=== 14th century ===
- 14th century: Urduja, a Filipino princess, takes part in several battles. Many historians believe that she was mythical, however.
- 14th century: Women of the Mississippian culture in the Central Illinois River Valley Region participated in warfare, defending their camp, if needed, while men were out hunting.
- 1326: Isabella of France invades England with Roger de Mortimer, and overthrows Edward II of England, replacing him with her son Edward III of England, with her and de Mortimer acting as regents.
- 1335: During the Second War of Scottish Independence, Christina Bruce commanded the garrison of Kildrummy Castle and successfully held the castle against pro-Baliol forces led by David III Strathbogie.
- 1335: The Scots defeat a company led by the Count of Namur. Amongst the Count's casualties was a female lancer who had killed her opponent, Richard Shaw, at the same moment that he had killed her. Her gender was only discovered when the bodies were being stripped of their armor at the end of the engagement. "The chronicler Bower seems to have been at least as impressed by the rarity of two mounted soldiers simultaneously transfixing one another with their lances as with the fact that one of them was a woman."
- 1338: Agnes, Countess of Dunbar successfully defends her castle against a siege by England's earl of Salisbury.
- 1342–1343: Joanna of Flanders conquers the city of Redon and defends the city of Hennebont during the Breton war.
- 1341–1347: Empress Irene Asanina commands the garrison of Didymoteicho and defend the city during the Byzantine civil war of 1341–1347.
- 1347: Philippa of Hainault persuaded the King to spare the lives of the Burghers of Calais. This popularity helped maintain peace in England throughout their long reign.
- 1348: Empress Irene Asanina organize the defense of Constantinople against the Genoese.
- 1351–1363: Han E serves as a soldier in the Chinese army as a man under the name Han Guanbao, and is promoted to lieutenant.
- 1351–1357: Cia Ordelaffi née Marzia degli Ubaldini an Italian noblewoman from Forlì came in help of Lodovico Ordelaffi during the battle of Dovadola (part of the Guelphs and Ghibellines war). In 1357, she took part in the defense of Cesena during the Forlivesi crusade induced by Pope Innocent VI.
- 1353: Empress Irene Asanina organize the defense of Constantinople against the army of John V.
- 1354: Ibn Battuta reports seeing female warriors in Southeast Asia.
- 1358: Richardis of Schwerin, Duchess of Schleswig defends Sönderborg Castle on Als against Valdemar IV of Denmark.
- 1364–1405: Timur uses female archers to defend baggage trains.
- 1387: Queen Jadwiga of Poland leads two military campaigns.
- 1389: Frisian regent Foelke Kampana leads armies to assist her spouse Ocko Kenisna tom Brok, chief of Auricherland: after finding him dead on the battlefield, she returns to Aurich, and upon finding it taken by an enemy during her absence, she retakes it by military force.
- 1395: Agnes Hotot takes part in a lance duel while dressed as a man, only revealing her gender once the fight is won.

=== 15th century ===
- 15th century: Qutlugh Nigar Khanum accompanies her son on military expeditions.
- 1419: Margaret of Bavaria defends French Burgundy against John IV, Count of Armagnac.
- 1420: Tang Sai'er starts a rebellion against the emperor of China and take two cities with her rebel army before she is defeated.
- 1428: Cecília Rozgonyi commanded her own ship in battle toward the Ottoman Empire under Sigismund of Hungary at Golubac fortress.
- 1428: Philippa of England, Queen of Denmark, successfully organized the defence of Copenhagen against the Hanseatic League, a heroic feat later recounted by Hans Christian Andersen in Godfather's Picture Book (1868).
- 1429: Joan of Arc asserts that God has sent her to drive the English out of France, and is given a position in the French Royal army. She is supported by Yolande of Aragon, mother of Queen Marie d'Anjou (wife of King Charles VII).
- 1430s: Jeanne des Armoises was a soldier in Italy.
- 1430: Aldonça de Bellera defends her barony of Rialp in Catalonia against Count Arnau Roger of IV Pallars.
- 1433: Ida Königsmarck legendary defense her fief Kastelholm Castle on Åland in Swedish Finland during the Engelbrekt rebellion.
- 1450s: Zaydi Yemeni chieftain Sharifa Fatima conquers San'a'.
- 1451–1452 : Brita Tott serves as a spy in the war between Sweden and Denmark
- 1455: Elise Eskilsdotter leads a war against the German merchant class of Bergen in Norway as revenge for the murder of her spouse, by means of her pirate fleet.
- 1461: Alice Knyvet defends Buckingham Castle at Norfolk against Sir Gilbert of Debenhem.
- 1466: Pomellina Fregoso stages and supports a rebellion against Lambert in the provinces of Menton and Roquebrunem.
- 1467: Ólöf Loftsdóttir personally leads a war against British traders working in Iceland.
- 1471: Queen Margaret of Anjou personally leads her troops in the Battle of Tewkesbury.
- 1472: Onorata Rodiani from Cremona, Italy, is mortally wounded in battle. She had disguised herself as a man to become a soldier.
- 1472: Jeanne Hachette rips down the flag of the invading Burgundians at Beauvais, inspiring the garrison to win the fight.
- 1474: Caterina d'Ortafà participate in the defense of Canet-en-Roussillon during the French invasion of Roussilon following the Catalan Civil War.
- 1480: Margareta of Celje defends the city of Glogow against the forces of the duke of Sagan, who lay siege to the town.
- 1480s: Mandukhai takes command of the Mongol army and defeats the Oirats.
- 1481: Dutch noblewoman Swob Sjaarda defends her castle during a siege in the Netherlands.
- 1487: Katarina Nipertz defends Raseborg Castle in Finland, the fief of her late spouse, against the troops of the new vassal appointed by the regent, for several weeks.
- 1494: Ats Bonninga defends her fort in Friesland.
- 1495: Beatrice d'Este supervised and animated the troops to move against the Duke of Orléans in place of her husband, thus managing to avoid the French conquest of the Duchy of Milan.
- 1496: Bauck Poppema defends her fort in Friesland.
- 1499: Caterina Sforza successfully defends Forli against a Venetian attack and become famous and nicknamed "The Tiger".

== See also ==
- Women in the Crusades.
- Timeline of women in ancient warfare
- Timeline of women in early modern warfare
