= Galero =

Hat worn by Catholic clergy

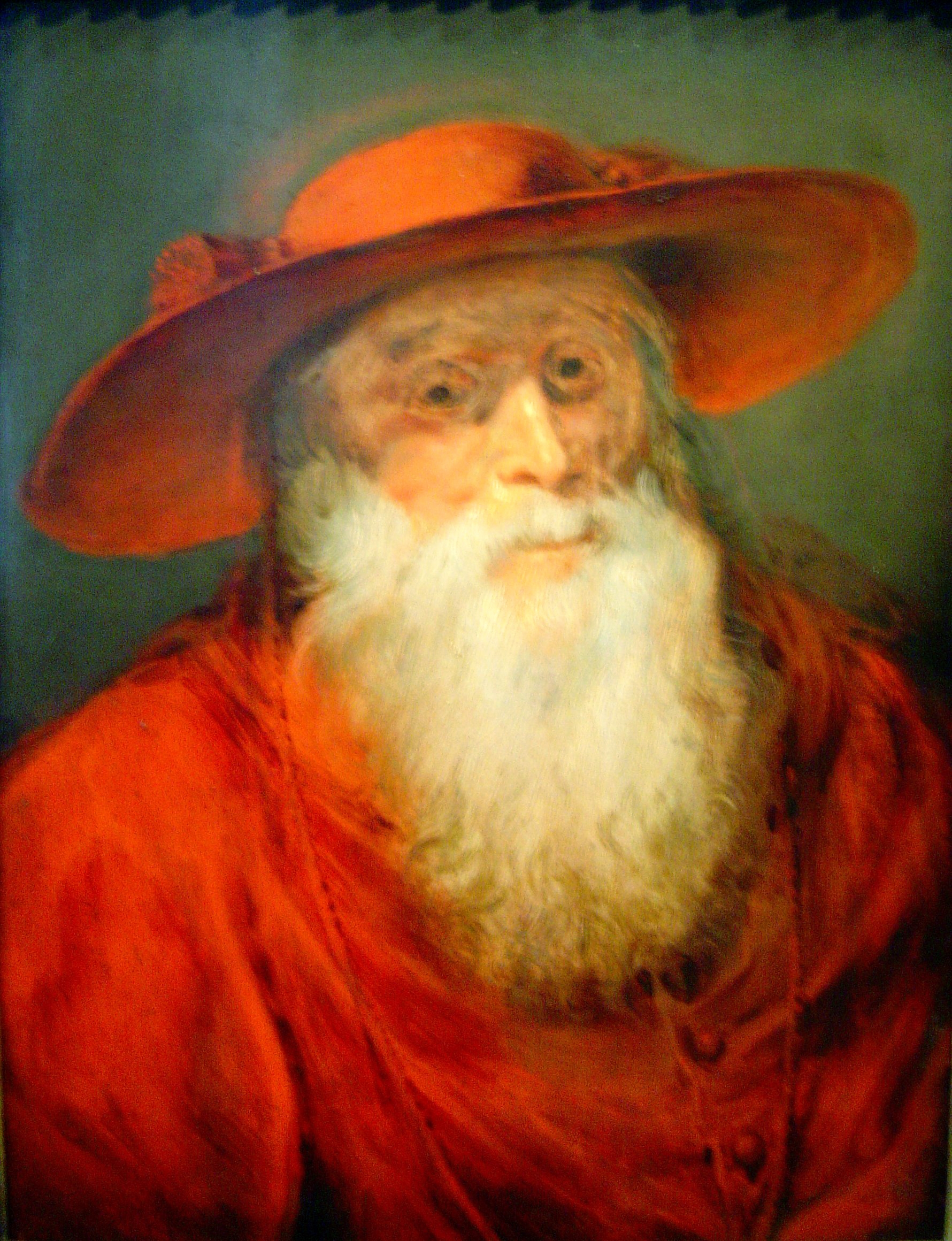
A cardinal's hat worn by St Jerome, depicted c. 1625 by Rubens

A galero (plural: galeri; from Latin: galērum, originally connoting a helmet made of skins; cf. galea) is a broad-brimmed hat with tasselated strings which was worn by clergy in the Catholic Church. Over the centuries, the red galero was restricted to use by individual cardinals while such other colors as black, green and violet were reserved to clergy of other ranks and styles.

== Description ==
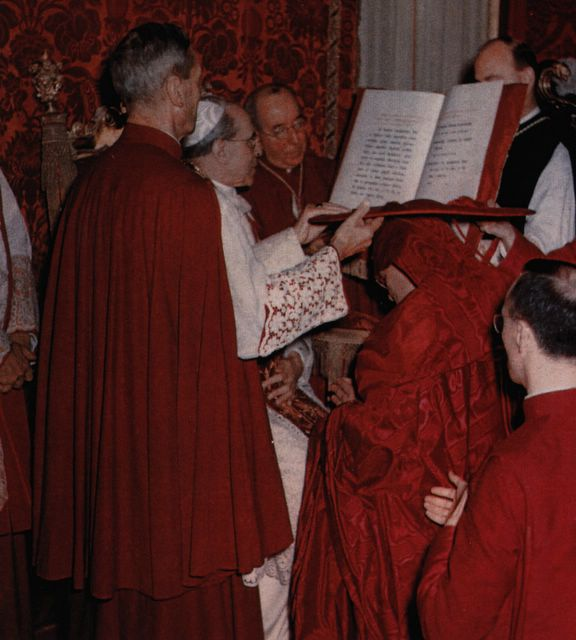
Pius XII placing the galero upon the head of a cardinal at a consistory.

When creating a cardinal, the pope used to place a scarlet galero on the new cardinal's head during the papal consistories, the practice giving rise to the phrase "receiving the red hat." In 1969, Pope Paul VI issued a decree ending the use of the galero. Since that time, only the scarlet zucchetto and biretta are placed over the heads of cardinals during the papal consistory. Some cardinals continue to obtain a galero privately so that the custom of suspending it over their tombs may be observed. Raymond Cardinal Burke has been known to publicly wear the galero on occasion in the 21st century.

A few cardinals from Eastern Catholic sui iuris Churches don their distinctive headdresses particular to the Churches. Other ecclesiastical hats are used by ministers of other Christian communities. Alongside Catholic clergy, the Scots Public Register records its use by Episcopal and Presbyterian ministers. The Moderator of the General Assembly of the Church of Scotland uses a black hat, with blue cords and ten tassels.

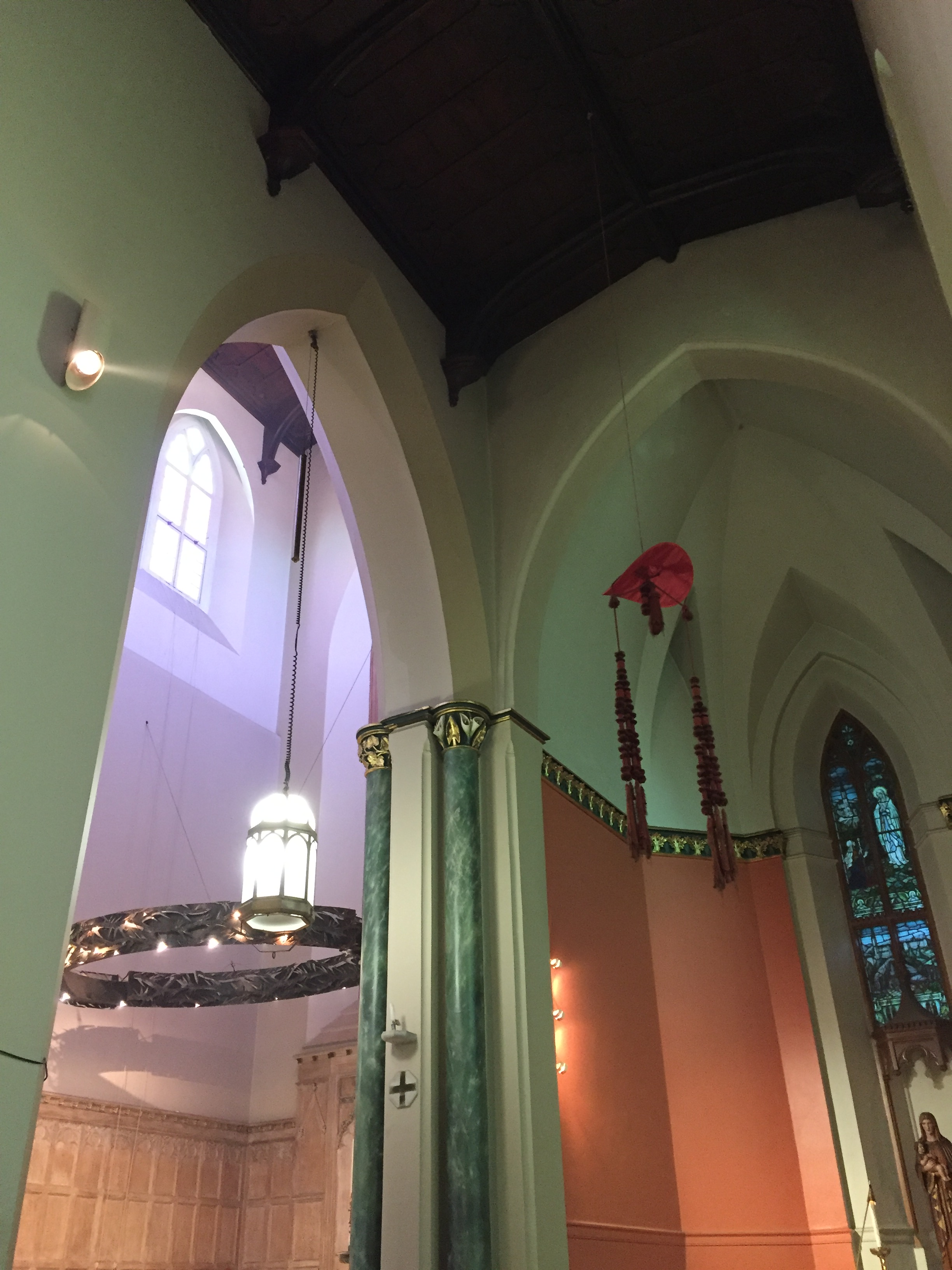
The galero of the late Cardinal Owen McCann hangs from the roof of St. Mary's Cathedral in Cape Town, South Africa.

Traditionally, the galero hangs over a cardinal's tomb until it is reduced to dust, symbolizing how all earthly glory is passing. In a cathedral that has no crypt, the galeri are suspended from the ceiling. For example, following the death of Basil Cardinal Hume, Archbishop of Westminster, in 1999, his relatives had a galero installed above his tomb in Westminster Cathedral, alongside those of his predecessors.

== History ==
The privilege of wearing the red galero was first granted to cardinals by Pope Innocent IV in 1245 at the First Council of Lyon. Tradition in the Archdiocese of Lyon is that the red color was inspired by the red hats of the canons of Lyon. Pope Innocent wanted his favorites to be distinct and recognizable in the lengthy processions at the council.

Anachronistically, some early Church Fathers are shown wearing a galero, notably Saint Jerome frequently is pictured in art either wearing a galero, or with one close by. Even though the office of cardinal did not exist in Jerome's day, he had been secretary to Pope Damasus I, which in later days would have made him a cardinal ex officio.

Cardinal Jean Cholet used his galero to crown Charles of Valois in 1285 at Girona during the Aragonese Crusade, pronouncing him King of Aragon. As a result, roi du chapeau ("king of the hat") became Charles's nickname.

The use of the galero was abolished in 1969 with instruction Ut sive sollicite.

== Ecclesiastical heraldry ==
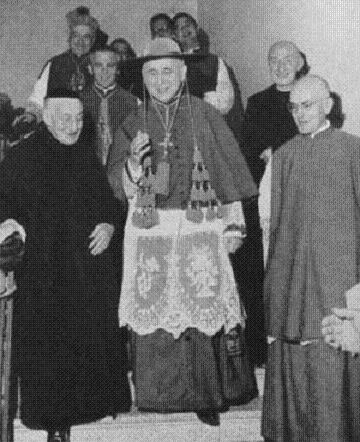
Archbishop Giovanni Colombo wearing a galero with ten green tassels on each side (c. 1965)

The galero continues to appear today in ecclesiastical heraldry as part of the achievement of the coat of arms of an armigerous Catholic cleric. The galero was originally a wide-brimmed pilgrim's hat, like a sombrero. The ecclesiastical hat replaced the helmet and crest, because those were considered too belligerent for men in the clerical estate.

The color of the hat and number of tassels indicate the cleric's place in the hierarchy. Generally, priests, abbots and ministers have a black hat with cords and tassels, the number depending upon their rank. Bishops generally use a green hat with green cords and six green tassels on each side, archbishops have likewise a green hat with green cords and ten green tassels on each side, and cardinals have a red hat with red cords and fifteen red tassels on each side. Depiction in arms can vary greatly depending on the artist's style.

== Gallery ==
Coat of arms of Lorenzo Cardinal Antonetti, with red galero

Bishop of Colonna family arms with green galero

Coat of arms of St. John de Britto with black galero

Coat of arms of Paulinus Greenwood, Abbot of St Augustine's Abbey with black galero

Chinese bishops occasionally avoid having a green galero in their arms, as "wearing a green hat" is a Chinese idiom for "cuckold"; for some years as an auxiliary bishop of Hong Kong, Bishop John Tong Hon used a violet galero with violet tassels (which is actually the galero proper to an Honorary Prelate of His Holiness). However, he resumed the use of the green galero on his coat of arms when he became the bishop of Hong Kong until he was created cardinal in 2012.

== See also ==
- List of hat styles
