= Aragonese–French wars =

There have been several Aragonese–French wars in history:

- Albigensian Crusade (1209–29)
- War of the Sicilian Vespers (1282–1302)
- Aragonese Crusade (1284–85)
- War of the Castilian Succession (1475–79)
- Four Years' War (1521–26)
