= Gerardo Bianchi =

Italian churchman and papal diplomat

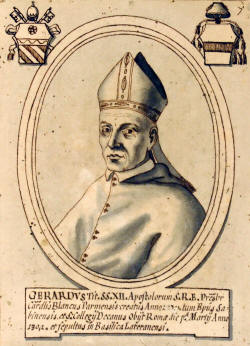
Gerardo Bianchi

Gerardo Bianchi (1220/1225 – 1 March 1302), also known as Gerardo da Parma or Gerard of Parma, was an Italian churchman and papal diplomat, an important figure of the War of the Sicilian Vespers.

== Life ==
Gerardo was born in Gainago, in the diocese of Parma, studied law at the University of Bologna, and became canon of the cathedral chapter of Parma.

He began his career in the Roman Curia as a chaplain of Pope Innocent IV (1243–1254) and scriptor in the chancellery (attested in 1245). He is attested as litterarum apostolicarum contradictorum Auditor (Auditor of the Rota) on 30 April 1277. At the time of his elevation to the Cardinalate, he was a Protonotarius apostolicus.

Pope Nicholas III in the Consistory of 12 March 1278, created nine cardinals, among them Gerardo Bianchi, whom he named Cardinal Priest of SS. XII Apostoli. On 15 July 1278 Pope Nicholas notified King Philip III of France that he was sending Cardinal Gerardo to Toulouse, where he would join with Cardinal Hieronymus Masci, O.Min. and Master General John of Vercelli, OP, in bringing about a peace with King Alfonso of Castile. On August 5 he was granted the right to employ the services of the members of whatever religious order he wished in his Legation to France. On 29 November, the Pope revised his instructions to the three Legates, in accordance with the wishes of the two kings, so that they would hold their meetings in Gascony. On 9 June 1279, Pope Nicholas threatened King Alfonso with severe penalties for not cooperating with the peace process.

Pope Nicholas III (Orsini) died on 22 August 1280, and Cardinal Bianchi participated in the Conclave which was held in Viterbo, beginning in September 1280. Nicholas III was succeeded by the French cardinal Simon de Brion on 22 February 1281, who took the name Martin IV.

On 12 April 1281, Holy Saturday, Pope Martin IV held a Consistory in which he created seven new cardinals, and promoted Cardinal Gerardo to the Order of Cardinal Bishops and assigned him the suburbicarian see of Sabina.

== Legate to the Kingdom of Sicily ==
The Sicilian Vespers, a revolt against the domination of the Island by King Charles of Anjou, which broke out in Palermo at Easter of 1282, shook the island of Sicily. Thousands of Angevins and other French residents of the island were massacred. The cities which had expelled the foreigners sent representatives to Pope Martin, begging him to take them under his protection and recognise them as free cities directly under the sovereignty of the Church. The Pope, always a supporter of King Charles, who had forced his election upon the College of Cardinals, refused. The cities then turned to King Pedro of Aragon for help.

On 5 June 1282, Cardinal Bianchi was appointed papal legate in Sicily to pacify the kingdom. In August he was sent into Messina, which was besieged, on behalf of Charles I of Naples, but to no effect. When King Charles and King Alfonso challenged each other to individual combat over their differences in the Autumn of 1282, Pope Martin wrote to King Charles, begging him not to carry out his undertakings.

In 1283, he was sent to Sicily again, to obtain a surrender of the rebellion there after the Sicilian Vespers; but his only success was the surrender of Naples. He was a close advisor to Charles of Salerno, but the sea-power of Roger of Lauria frustrated the campaign.

In March 1284, he presided over a synod which met in the city of Melfi. The canons of that council were promulgated on 28 March 1284.

On the death of Charles I of Naples in 1285, he shared the regency of the Kingdom of Sicily with Robert II of Artois. In practical terms, however, power was held by Mary of Hungary, Queen of Naples, wife of the imprisoned Charles II of Naples (the former Prince of Salerno).

He was still Legate and Regent under Honorius IV (1285–1287). He continued as Legate in Sicily-South Italy (Trani, Messana), 1288–1289

== France ==
In 1290, he was in France on a diplomatic mission with Benedetto Gaetani, on behalf of Pope Nicholas IV, principally to settle differences between France and Aragon and England. The dispatch of Cardinal Gerardo was announced to King Philip IV in a letter of Pope Nicholas dated 23 March 1290. In June 1290, they were in Lyons, where they adjudicated a case relating to temporal jurisdiction in the city of Lyons, which was being contested between the Archbishop of Lyons and the Cathedral Chapter. At the beginning of October, they arrived in Reims, intending to resolve a conflict between the archbishop and the canons. During the dispute, the Canons had withdrawn from participation in liturgical activities in the Cathedral, and had forbidden the use of the organ. The two cardinals suspended the boycott during their visit, and when they issued their decree settling the dispute, they required the Archbishop and Canons to have two statues of the two cardinals made, which would be displayed at the High Altar of the Cathedral during important celebrations.

The following year, he and Gaetani were present at the signing of the Treaty of Tarascon, negotiated to bring to a conclusion the Aragonese Crusade.

== Back in Italy ==
Cardinal Gerardo Bianchi was Prior Episcoporum of the College of Cardinals from the death of Cardinal Latino Malabranca Orsini on August 9, 1294. In 1297, he consecrated an altar in honour of S. Mary Magdalen in the Lateran Basilica. He was also Archpriest of the Lateran Basilica (ca. 1299–1302).

On 13 April 1298, Pope Boniface VIII (1294–1303) granted Cardinal Gerardo permission to carry out his plan to found a monastery for the Cistercians in his home town of Parma in honour of S. Martin de Bozis (S. Martino de Bocci). On 3 October 1298, the Pope granted to Cardinal Gerardo's monastery, which did not yet have any monks or a Prior, the Priory of S. Leonardo near Parma.

From 17 July 1299 to 14 January 1302, Cardinal Gerardo Bianchi was Legate to the Kingdom of Sicily again. The Cardinal was again pressed into service, being appointed Legate in Sicily with full powers by Boniface VIII on 20 July 1299. His assigned task was to reconcile Frederick III of Sicily and his rebels with the Roman Church. He was immediately peppered with one letter after another of advice and mandates as to how to accomplish his task. He was also assigned a junior cardinal-deacon, Landolfo Brancaccio of S. Angelo in Pescheria, to assist in his work. On 1 February 1300, Cardinal Gerardo appears as Legate again, to whom the Pope sends a letter of complaint, that Philip, Prince of Taranto, the younger son of Charles II of Naples, had crossed the Straits of Messana, in violation of a papal prohibition.

He died in Rome on 1 March 1302, and was buried in the Lateran Basilica.

== Bibliography ==
- S. Sägmüller, Die Thätigkeit und Stellung der Kardinäle bis Papst Bonifaz VIII., historisch und canonistisch untersucht und dargestellt (Freiburg i. B. 1896).
- Bernhard Pawlicki, Papst Honorius IV. Eine Monographie (Münster 1896).
- Otto Schiff, Studien zur Geschichte Papst Nikolaus' IV. (Berlin 1897) (Historische Studien 5).
- Heinrich Finke, Aus den Tagen Bonifaz VIII. Funde und Forschungen (Münster i. W. 1902).
- O. Cartellieri, Peter von Aragon und die sizilianische Vesper (Heidelberg 1904).
- R. Sternfeld, "Das Konklave von 1280 und die Wahl Martins IV. (1281)," Mitteilungen des Instituts für Österreichische Geschichtsforschung 21 (1910), pp. 1–53.
- E. H. Rohde, Der Kampf um Sizilien in den Jahren 1291-1302 (Berlin and Leipzig 1913).
- Peter Herde, Colestin V (1294) (Peter vom Morone): Der Engelpapa (Stuttgart, 1981).
- Steven Runciman (1960), The Sicilian Vespers Cambridge: Cambridge University Press.
- Pietro Maria Silanos (2008). Gerardo Bianchi da Parma. La biografia di un cardinale duecentesco. (in Italian). Parma: Università degli Studi di Parma, Dottorato di ricerca in Storia, XXI Ciclo (2007–2008).
