= Jean Cholet =

French professor and cardinal

Cardinal Jean Cholet
- Cardinal-Priest
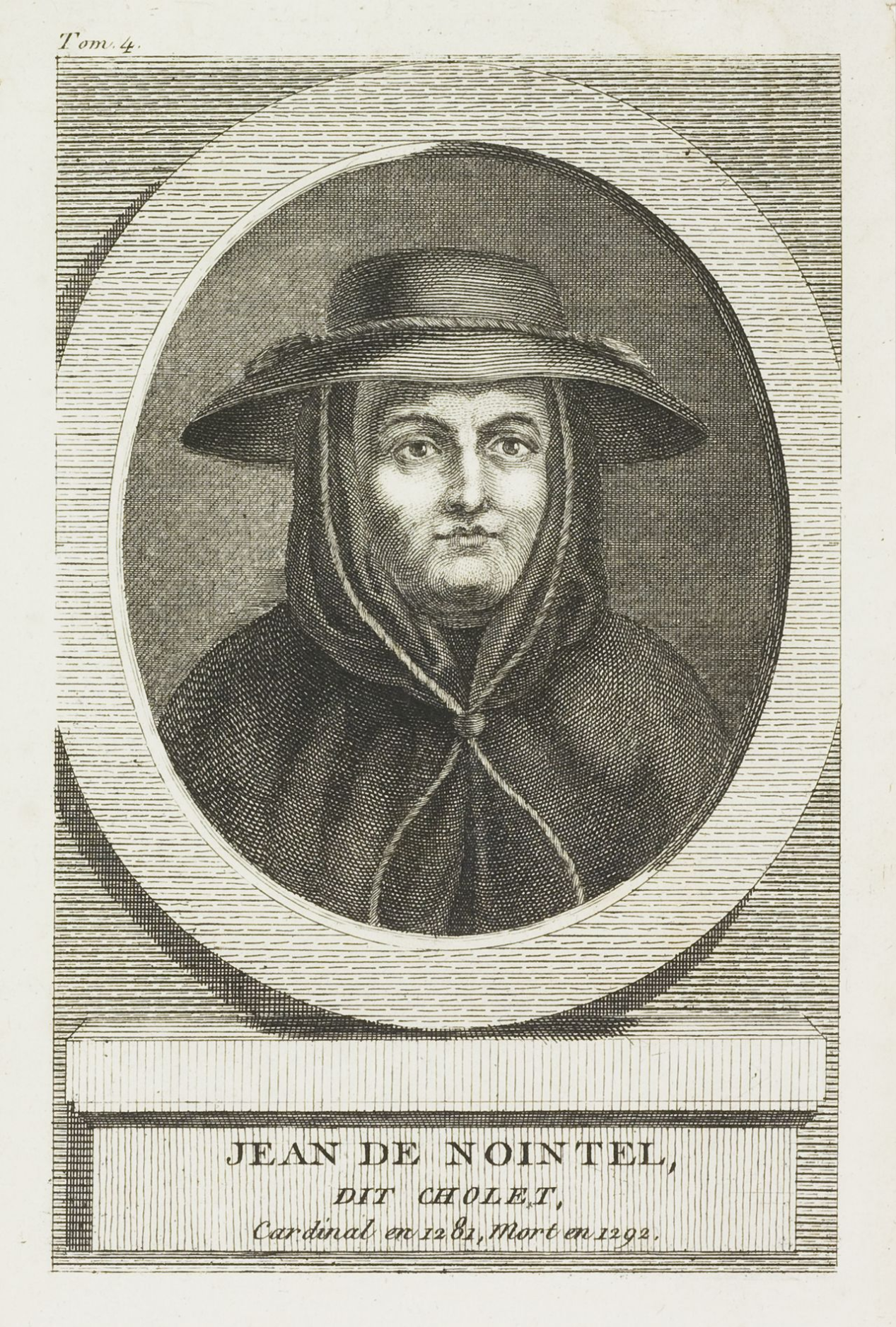
- Native name: Jehan de Noentel

Orders
- Created cardinal: 12 April 1281 by Pope Martin IV
- Rank: Cardinal Priest

Personal details
- Born: Chateau de Nointel, Oise, France
- Died: 2 August 1293 Rome, Italy
- Buried: Saint-Lucien, Beauvais FR
- Occupation: Diplomat, Administrator
- Profession: Priest
- Education: Paris (Doctor utriusque iuris)

Jean Cholet (died 2 August 1293) was a French cardinal and Doctor utriusque iure (Doctor of Civil and Canon Law) at the University of Paris. His diplomatic skills helped prevent a duel between the kings of France and Aragon. He served as Papal Legate in France, and was responsible for organizing the Aragonese Crusade of 1283–84. He was then a working member of the Roman Curia.

== Early life ==
Cholet was born in the Chateau of Nointel, in the diocese of Beauvais. In contemporary documents (including those of the Chambre des Comptes in Paris) he is called Joannes de Noentel or Jehan de Noentel. He had two brothers, Eudes (Odo, Odon), who became Abbot of S. Lucien de Beauvais, and Jean, who became Canon of the Cathedral of S. Gervais de Soissons. He initially followed a military career, like his father, but eventually opted for the religious life. He began his career as a Canon of the Collegiate Church of Notre Dame du Châtel in Beauvais. He was then made a Canon of the Cathedral of S. Pierre in Beauvais, one of twenty-seven Canons, at some moment before 1267. He was named Archdeacon of Caux (Minoris-Caleti) in the diocese of Rouen; documents indicate that he possessed that dignity around the year 1240 (?). Archbishop Eudes Rigaud of Rouen (1248-1275) made Jean Cholet his Grand Vicar. On 31 March 1267, as Canon of Beauvais, he was a scrutator in the election of a new Bishop of Beauvais, and when the Dean of the Chapter was elected, Jean de Nointel made the formal announcement. He was a cleric of the Royal Chapel of King Philip III in 1274.

== Cardinal Cholet ==
In a Consistory that was held at Orvieto on 23 March (or 12 April), 1281, Jean Cholet was one of seven prelates raised to the dignity of cardinal by Pope Martin IV (Simon de Brion). He was assigned the Church of S. Cecilia in Trastevere as his titulus, the same church that his friend Simon de Brion had possessed as a cardinal. As a new Cardinal in the Roman Curia, he had his share of arbitration cases. One in particular was the litigation between Prior Adam of the monastery of Saint-Vincent de Senlis and the Prior, Sub-prior, and other members of the community.

== Sicilian Vespers ==
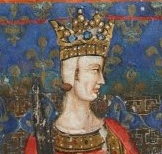
Charles I of Sicily

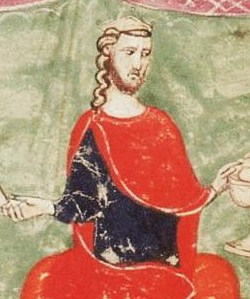
Peter III of Aragon

In 1282 the situation of the Papacy with regard to southern Italy changed dramatically. On 7 May, the famous Sicilian Vespers began in Palermo, resulting in the loss of the island, a papal fief, by King Charles I. The King of Aragon, Pedro I, took advantage of the revolt by invading and occupying the island of Sicily. He began to style himself "King", which infuriated both King Charles and Pope Martin IV. King Charles and King Pedro challenged each other to trial by single combat (duel), which greatly annoyed the Pope, who believed that the decision as to legitimacy was his. On 5 June the Pope appointed a Legate in the Kingdom of Sicily, Cardinal Gerardo Bianchi, and ordered him to get King Charles to abandon the plan of trial by combat. Bianchi was unsuccessful. On 18 November 1282, therefore, Pope Martin IV opened proceedings against King Pedro of Aragon, because he had invaded the territory of Sicily and was usurping the crown. The proceedings were concluded by 21 March 1283, when Pope Martin publicly deposed King Pedro and released all of his subjects from allegiance to him. The duel was still in prospect, however, and the Pope also tried to get the King of France and the King of England to intervene. In his letter to King Edward I, Pope Martin recommended to him the services of Cardinal Joannes of S. Cecilia (Jean Cholet), a statement which is often interpreted as the appointment of Cardinal Cholet to an Embassy to England. The details of the letter itself, however, make it obvious that the Pope expects King Edward and Cholet to work through intermediaries (suos nuntios vel litteras) and the King's agents (vicarios et officiales tuos). In 1283 Cholet already had an all-consuming task—organizing a crusade for the conquest of Aragon. In 1282 and 1283 King Edward, too, was fully engaged in the full-scale conquest and subjugation of Wales; it was not until 11 December 1282 that Llywelyn was killed at the Battle of Orewin Bridge. Edward did have time, however, to order his agents in Aquitaine not to permit the two combatants to engage in their duel in Bordeaux (which had been the proposed site), or anywhere else in his realm. His decision not to intervene in the dynastic problems of France and Aragon was probably sufficient for the Pope's purposes.

On 4 May 1283, Cardinal Cholet, papal Legate to France, was issued a mandate to correct certain statutes enacted by Archbishop Jean de Montsoreau of Tours (1271-1285) in his provincial council of 1282.

== The Aragonese Crusade ==
Cardinal Cholet was commissioned by his long-time friend, Pope Martin IV, to preach the Aragonese Crusade in 1283. The date on his commission as Legate in France is 9 April 1283. On 27 August 1283, he was granted the faculty of transferring the "vacant" throne of Aragon and the County of Barcelona to one of the sons of King Philip of France. On 3 September 1283, Pope Martin ordered all of the ecclesiastical persons in France to give 10% of their income for three years to the King of France for the Crusade against Pedro of Aragon. He ordered Cardinal Cholet to see to it that these contributions were paid, even by the monastic orders, Templars and Hospitallers. On 10 January 1284, the Pope prodded him to get on with the business: Prince Charles was finally chosen, after long negotiations with Cardinal Cholet, and Pope Martin IV confirmed his appointment as King of Aragon and Count of Barcelona on 5 May 1284. On 4 June 1284, Cardinal Bernard de Languissel, Bishop of Porto, was ordered to preach the crusade against former King Pedro of Aragon throughout his legation in northern Italy, and Cardinal Gerardo Bianchi, Bishop of Sabina, to do the same in south Italy. The Pope even enlisted the Dominicans and Franciscans in Sardinia and Corsica to preach the crusade.

Cardinal Jean Cholet was also given legatine authority over the orders of friars, both generally at his appointment as Legate in the Kingdom of France, and as part of his commission to preach the plenary indulgence to all those who fought alongside Charles of Valois for the Crown of Aragon against Peter III.

By 5 May 1284, Cardinal Cholet had accumulated the following 'provinces' in his Legatine commission: France, Navarre, Aragon, Valencia, the Kingdom of Majorca, Lyon, Besançon, Vienne, Tarentaise, Ebrudun, Liège, Metz, Verdun, and Tulle. In mid-August, 1284, the Cardinal presided over a Council meeting in Paris; a maxima multitude praelatorum attended. In 1284, when the aldermen of Lille attacked a troupe of Dominicans trying to preach the Aragonese Crusade in their town, Cholet fined them 4,000 livres de Paris and used the money to finance the crusade. In 1285, Cholet himself accompanied Charles into Aragon. The chronicle of S. Paul de Narbonne informs us that on 15 March 1285, the Cardinal accompanied King Philip the Hardi and his two sons, Philip and Charles, in their entry into Narbonne. From there they proceeded into Roussilon and entered Catalonia. On 28 April 1285 at Girona, Cholet placed his galero on Charles' head and pronounced him king. This act earned Charles the satirical nickname roi du chapeau or Cárles, rey del Xapeu ('king of the hat'), implying that he was no properly crowned king, merely a creature of the Papacy. It was at that moment that Cardinal Cholet made the famous remark,

If any man die there, which may God forbid, then will he in shining whiteness ascend into the presence of God, for God will not in any wise permit that his soul be sent to purgatory.

The Pope's grant of a plenary indulgence was being applied.

Charles' elevation was approved by the Pope on 5 May 1284. But, in an ironic twist, Charles' father, Philip III, died of dysentery in Perpignan, the capital of his ally James II of Majorca, on 5 October 1285. His skin was removed and interred in the Cathedral of Narbonne. His body was carried back to Paris by the many members of the French Court who had accompanied him in the Crusade against Aragon. When the cortege reached Paris, the Dominicans, who had been highly favored by the late King, wished to have a share of the relics. They employed the Confessor of the new king, Philip IV, to persuade the king to give them Philip III's heart—which he most imprudently agreed to do. There was an immediate protest at this violation of custom and ceremonial. The Benedictine monks of Saint Denis ought to have received all the remains. Both heart and bones were separately buried in the Basilica. Cardinal Cholet and the principal lords of the French Court supported the monks of S. Denis, and some members of the University of Paris even put in their opinion, that the King should not have given the heart, the monks of S. Denis should not have surrendered it, and the Dominican friars should not have kept it, without a specific dispensation from the Pope. No one was pleased, but the Dominicans had and kept possession. Elsewhere, the late King's uncle, Charles of Anjou, King of Sicily, also died in 1285, on 7 January, and King Pedro III of Aragon died on 11 November 1285, one month after his great antagonist, Philip III.

On 6 January 1286, the Cardinal Legate was present at the Coronation of Philip IV. In accordance with a bull of Honorius IV, he settled the differences between the scholars of the University and the Chancellor of Paris. In 1286 he gave the Royal Abbey of S. Lucien de Beauvais funds to purchase the land and seigneurie of Foulangues. At some point he also funded the acquisition of the fief of Maulers.

But Cardinal Cholet was still preaching the pope's crusades against his secular opponents in 1286. Pedro III may have died, but Sicily was still not back in papal hands. A legitimate king was needed to swear fealty to the Papacy. On 30 April 1286, Pope Honorius IV granted an indulgence to all Italian clergy who paid in one year the tithe which had been levied for three years. In May he ordered Cholet to use the indulgence sparingly.

== Conclave: absent ==
Cardinal Cholet did not attend the Conclave of 1287-1288, being still Legate in France. The Conclave began in April, in the papal palace at Santa Sabina on the Aventine Hill, where Pope Honorius IV (Giacomo Savelli) had died. But Rome was infested with pestilence that year, and six of the cardinals died. Nearly all of them scattered to their own private residences, trying to recover or trying to avoid being afflicted. Only one cardinal stayed on in the papal palace, and when winter caused the pestilence to abate, the surviving cardinals returned — Latino Malabranca, Bentivenga de Bentivengis, Girolamo Masci, Bernard de Languissel, Matteo Rosso Orsini, Giacomo Colonna, and Benedetto Caetani. On 22 February 1288, they happily elected the cardinal who had stayed at his station, Girolamo Masci d' Ascoli, O.Min., Suburbicarian Bishop of Palestrina, who took the name Nicholas IV. He wrote on 5 March to Cardinal John of S. Cecilia, directing him to assist Master Galienus de Pisis in finding a quiet place of retirement at Villa Sancti Marcelli, near Paris.

== In the Curia. Conclave ==
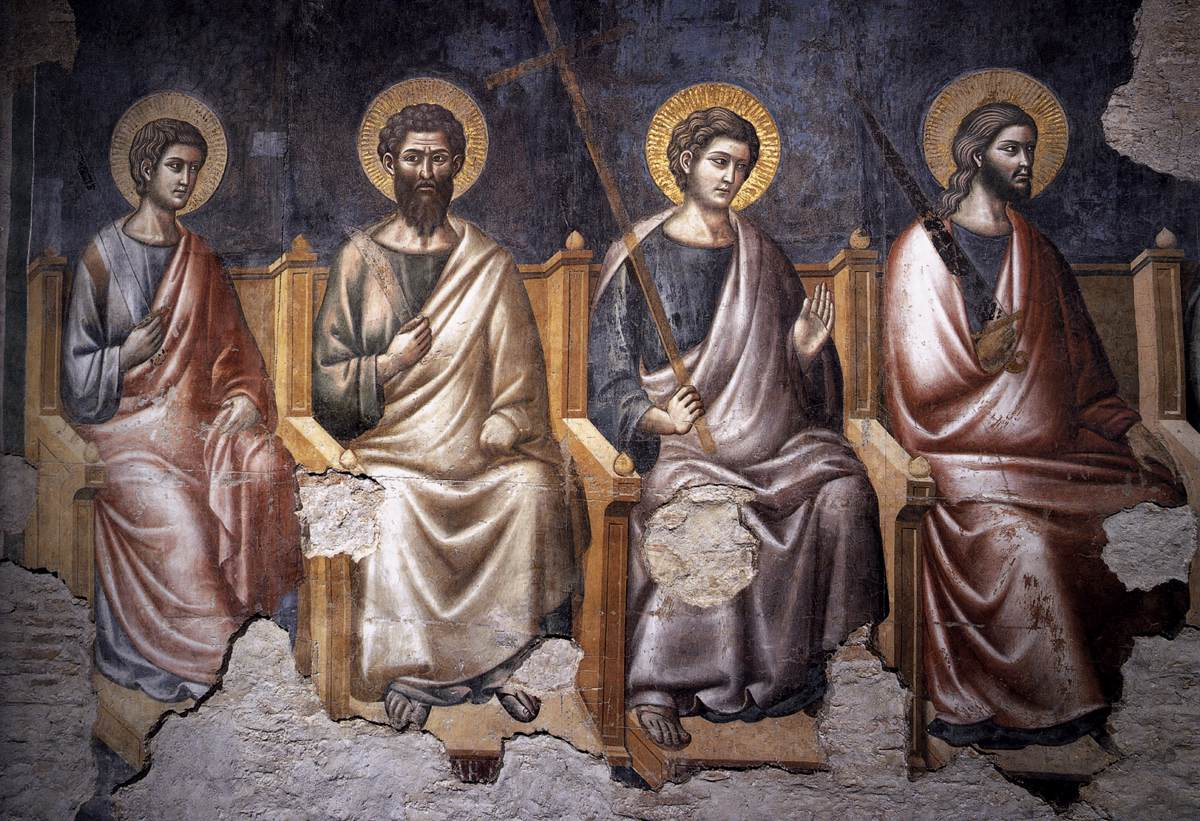
fresco in S. Cecilia, by Pietro Cavallini, commissioned by Cardinal Cholet

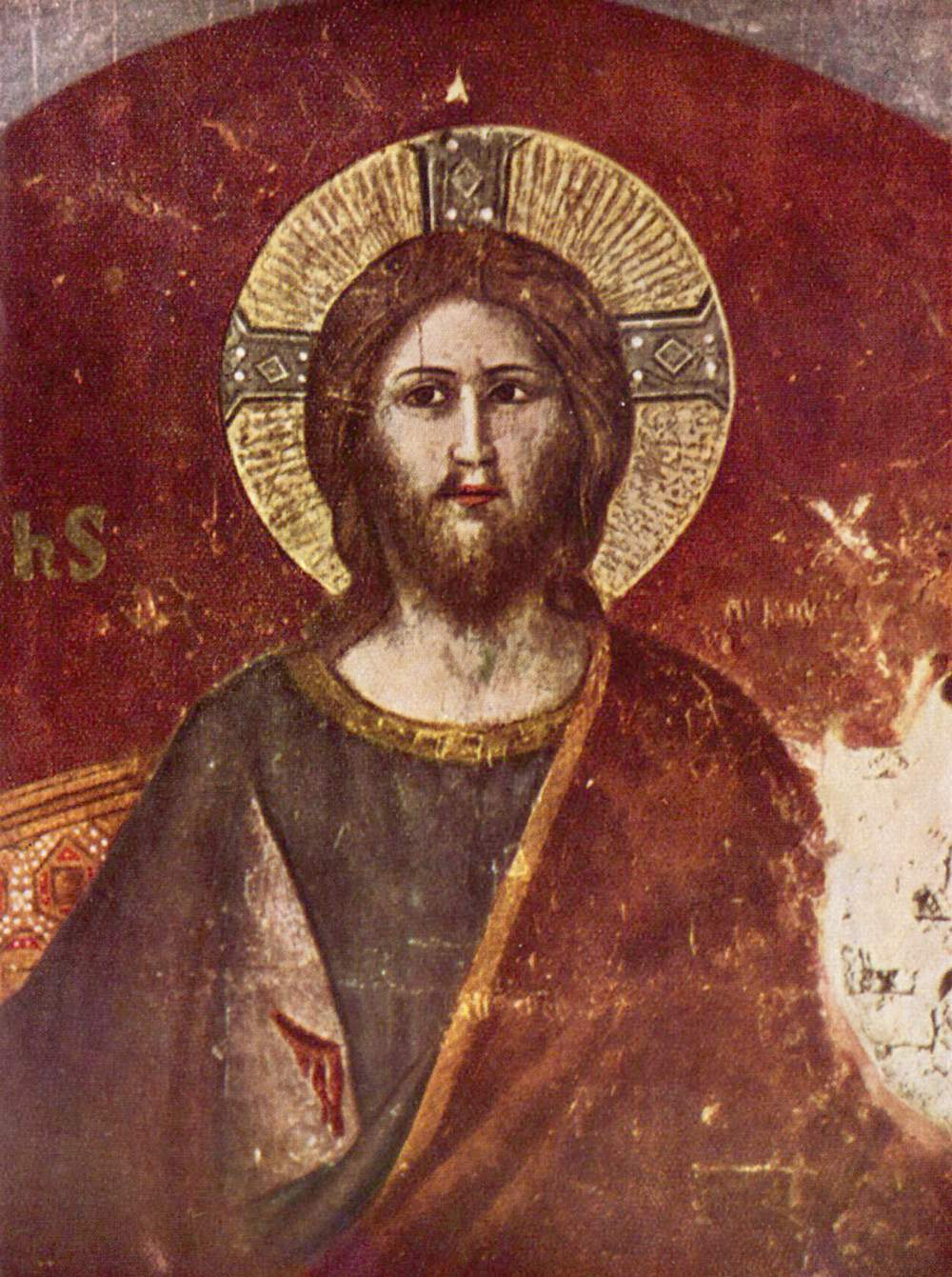
fresco in S. Cecilia, Cavallini

Cardinal Cholet's long Legateship in France came to an end in the summer of 1290. On 16 September 1290, he was back in Italy, at Orvieto, in the Roman Curia, sitting on a committee of episcopal examiners. He continued working at the Roman Curia during 1291 and 1292. On 29 February 1292, he was present at a Consistory that took place in Rome at Santa Maria Maggiore to sign a bull granting privileges to the Hospital of Macadura in the diocese of Piacenza. On 23 March, he is mentioned as a member of a committee of cardinals who investigated the election of Bishop Gerard of Soissons. It was perhaps around this time that Cardinal Cholet commissioned a series of frescoes for his titular church of Santa Cecilia in Trastevere from Pietro Cavallini (1259 – c. 1330), who was also working on the mosaics at S. Maria Transtiberim. The "Last Judgment" is regarded by some as his masterpiece.

Pope Nicholas IV died in Rome at his residence at Santa Maria Maggiore on Holy Saturday, April 4, 1292. At the time of his death, there were twelve living cardinals, according to the Subdeacon of the Holy Roman Church, Giacopo Caetani Stefaneschi, who was present at the events. One of them was Cardinal Jean Cholet. The Conclave, however, lasted for two years and three months, during which Cardinal Cholet died. Only eleven cardinals signed the electoral decree of Pope Celestine V on Monday, 5 July 1294.

== Testament, Death, Burial ==
In 1292, Cholet drew up his Last Will and Testament. His first legacy was of 2000 livres Tournois to the Benedictine monastery of S. Lucien de Beauvais, which he had chosen as his burial place. He left 200 livres to the monastery of S. Maria de Britolio (Bretteuil) near Beauvais for the purchase of properties, the income of which was to be used for Masses for the repose of his soul; similarly to the monastery of S. Geremario Flavigniacensis (S. Germer-de-Fly) in the diocese of Autun, and lesser amounts to many other religious houses for remembrances and distributions to the poor. Various legacies within the diocese of Rouen were calculated as having amounted to 33,041 livres in silver. He left 6,000 livres Tournois to the "matter of Aragon", that is, to the war chest of Charles de Valois, the brother of Philip IV, who had been crowned with the galero, on the condition that Charles make a further expedition into Aragon. Otherwise the money was to be distributed to a long list of monasteries and religious houses, and to the poor. His books, individually named, were bequeathed to various clerics.

Cardinal Jean Cholet died on 2 August 1293, according to an obituary of S. Lucien de Beauvais. He died on 3 August 1293, according to the Martyrology of the Church of Beauvais. But, according to the Martyrology of the Church of S. Gervais at Soissons, he died in September, 1292, on the Saturday after the Feast of S. Michael (which is celebrated on September 29). He also died on 9 May, at the Saint Chapelle in Paris, though at S. Genevieve in Paris he died on 13 August. At Amiens, the date of his decease was 11 August. He was buried in the Church of S. Lucien in Beauvais, in the sanctuary on the gospel-side. His funeral inscription is given by Duchesne.

== Sources ==
- François Duchesne, Histoire de tous les cardinaux François de naissance (Paris 1660), pp. 291–301.
- Lorenzo Cardella, Memorie de' cardinali della santa Romana chiesa II (Roma 1793), 23-24.
- Housley, Norman (1982). The Italian Crusades: The Papal-Angevin Alliance and the Crusades Against Christian Lay Powers, 1254–1343. Oxford University Press. ISBN 0198219253.
- Chaytor, H. J. (1933). A History of Aragon and Catalonia. London: Methuen.
- Eugène Müller, "Le cardinal Jean Cholet," Mémoires de la Société académique d'archéologie, sciences et arts du département de l'Oise, XI. 3 (Beauvais: 1882), pp. 790–835.
- E. Rabut, "Les Cholets. Étude historique et topographique d' un collège parisien," Paris et Île-de-France. Memoires 21 (1970), 7-95 and 22 (1971) 119-231.
