= Aldonça de Bellera =

Spanish noble

Aldonça de Bellera (1370–1435 CEZ), was a Catalan noble from the Crown of Aragon, known for her defense of her lands.

She was married to Arnau Guillem de Bellera, and retired to her dower fief, the castle Rialp and its surrounding valleys and villages, when she was widowed in 1412. She is described as a good landlord with a peaceful and just rule over her domains. She is foremost known for the incident when her dower lands were attacked and occupied by count Arnau Roger of IV Pallars, her son's brother-in-law, in 1430. On 16 February, 1430, she was awoken and met with 50 armed soldiers outside. Her calm reaction was admired by her contemporaries. She held the castle and organized the resistance while the domain outside was pillaged. She advised the peasantry to swear the allegiance to the invader, but to report the attack to Maria of Castile, Queen of Aragon. By March, Pallars was forced, on royal command, to end his occupation of Rialp and to return the rule of Rialp domain to her. She did not leave her fortress until her rights of her barony were guaranteed, and until Pallars was oredered by law to compensate her and her peasantry for damages.

== Sources ==
- «Diccionari Biogràfic de Dones: Aldonça, de Bellera»
- Fuvià, Armand de (1989). Els primitius comtats i vescomtats de Catalunya. Barcelona: Enciclopedia Catalana.
