= Katarina Nipertz =

Swedish noblewoman (died 1487)

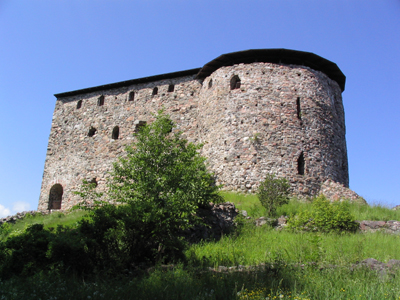
The remains of Raseborg Castle.

Katarina Erikintytär Nipertz (died 1487) was a Swedish noblewoman and fiefholder of Raseborg Castle, Sweden (now Finland).

She was married to Ivar Axelsson till Lillö, fiefholder of Raseborg. Upon his death in 1483, she took control of the castle and fief. In 1487, the regent Sten Sture the Elder appointed a new fiefholder of Raseborg and sent troops there to take over the castle, and she defended it for several weeks. Her daughter Margareta Laurensdotter Tott was married to Kristiern Bengtsson (Oxenstierna) the younger (1475–1520) who became one of the victims in the Stockholm Bloodbath in November 1520.
