= Mercadera =

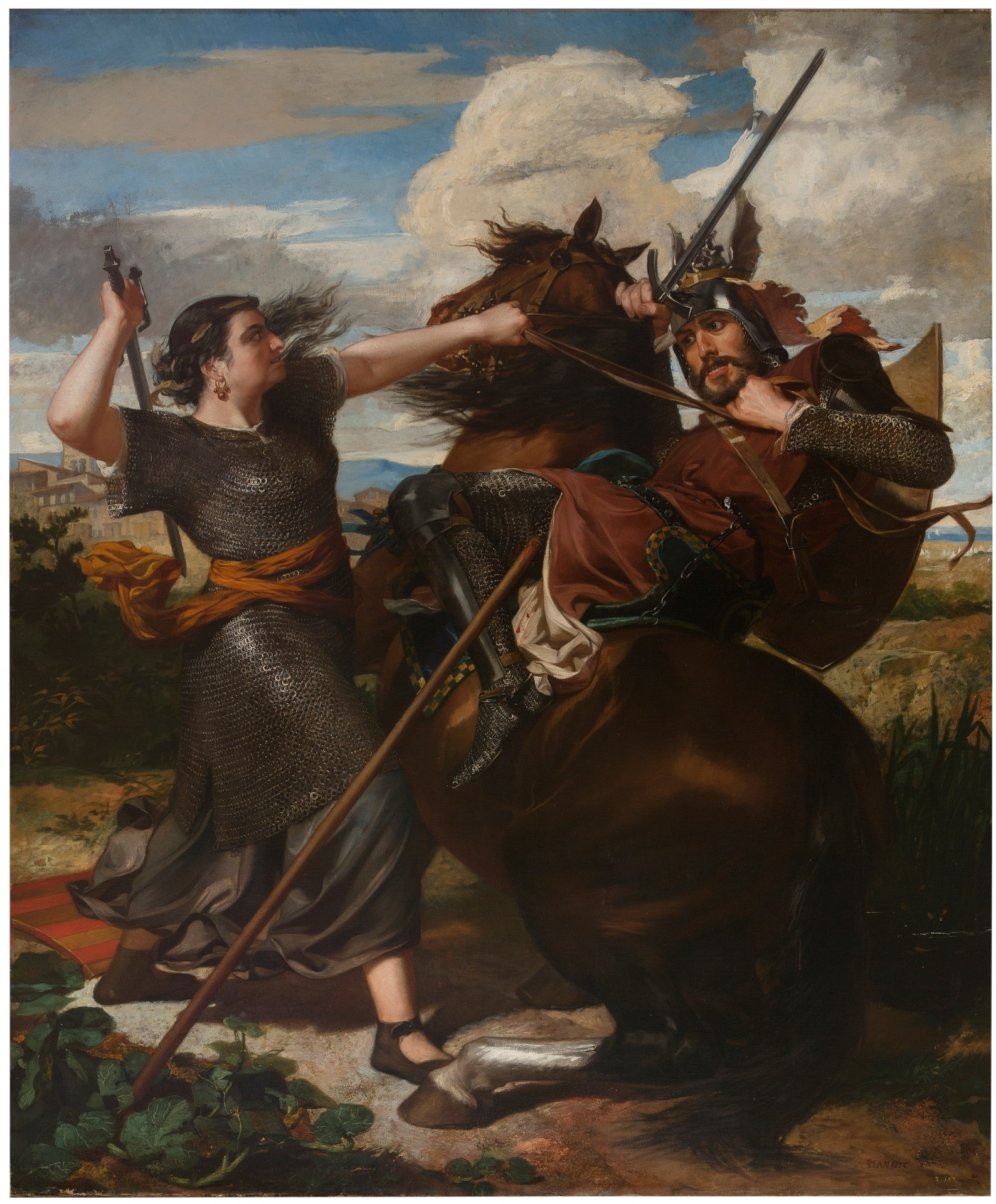
L'heroïna de Peralada

Na Mercadera (called thus because she had a shop) (1245-1300), was a Catalan war heroine of the Aragonese Crusade.

In 1285, France invaded the Crown of Aragon via Catalonia's Roussillon and Empordà, and placed the city of Peralada under siege. Mercadera was a manufacturer of ornaments for clothing such as bands and ribbons. According to the Chronicle of Muntaner, written by Ramon Muntaner, who knew Mercadera as they were both from Peralada, she was "a very clever woman and big and tall".

Similar to other citizens, she had a garden outside the city walls which provided an important food supply, but it was dangerous to leave the city walls, for fear of the enemy soldiers. Nonetheless, Mercadera decided to go to her garden and tend to her cabbages, so she dessed herself in men's clothes, and took with her multiple weapons: a lance, a sword, and a shield.

As she picked cabbages, she realised that a French soldier, on his horse, was in a ditch between her garden and another, unable to determine how to get out. Mercadera grabbed her lance and thrust it into the soldier's leg, wounded him and his horse, and then threatened him with her sword, demanding he surrender. He surrendered, and she took him into the city as her prisoner.

She handed him over to the Aragonese authorities. King Peter III of Aragon had her repeat her tale to him several times and awarded her the armor and weapons of the French knight, which was customary for a warrior capturing an enemy. She then ransomed her prisoner, for the price of 200 gold florins. The incident attracted great attention and she was hailed as a patriotic Catalan heroine of the war.
