= Treaty of Tarascon =

1291 peace treaty

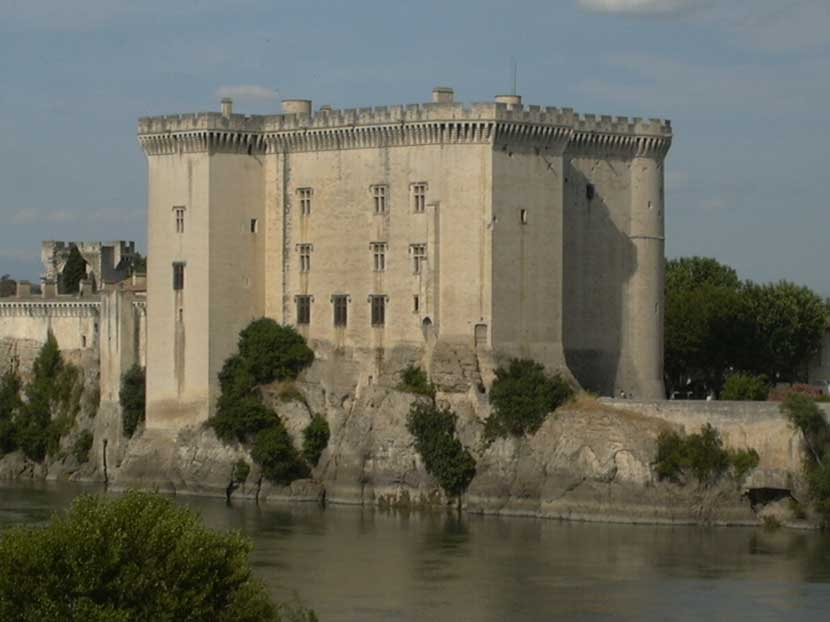
Tarascon Castle

The Treaty of Tarascon was an accord between Pope Nicholas IV, Philip IV of France, Charles II of Naples, and Alfonso III of Aragón that was intended to end the Aragonese Crusade, an episode in the War of the Sicilian Vespers. The treaty was signed at Tarascon, halfway between papal Avignon and Arles, on 19 February 1291, six years after Philip's brother, Charles of Valois, tried to conquer Aragón from Alfonso's father, Peter III of Aragon, in an event called the Aragonese Crusade because it was sanctioned by Nicholas' predecessor, Pope Martin IV. The intent of the signatories in putting an end to hostilities was to prevent Aragonese domination of Sicily, then ruled by Alfonso's brother, James II.

Alfonso was obligated by the treaty to:

- go to Rome in person to have the excommunication lifted.
- pay a tribute of thirty ounces of gold to the church
- carry out a crusade to the Holy Land
- remove from Sicily all Aragonese and Catalan knights in the service of James

Alfonso also promised that his brother would not hold his kingdom against the wishes of the papacy. He was counselled likewise to make peace with the king of Castile, Sancho IV.

The pope, for his part, annulled the investiture of Charles of Valois as king of Aragón and recognised the rights of James II of Majorca.

When Alfonso died a little more than a month after the signing of the treaty, the clauses were rendered null and void, and the treaty meant nothing. James, who had not been a signatory, now united in his person the crowns of Aragon and Sicily and was unwilling to part with either. It was superseded by the Treaty of Anagni of 1295, brokered by a stronger pope than Nicholas, Boniface VIII, which ended the struggle on terms that left the Aragonese masters of Sicily.

== See also ==
- List of treaties
