= Caterina d'Ortafà =

Catalan noblewoman

Caterina d'Ortafà (fl. 1474), was a Catalan noblewoman. She is known for her defense of Canet-en-Roussillon during the French invasion of Roussilon following the Catalan Civil War in 1474.

Possibly a daughter of Ramon d'Ortafà, she was married to nobleman Pere de Rocabertí, lord of the castle Sant Mori. Along with her sister Joana, she was taken hostage by the king of Aragon after the fall of Sant Mori during the Catalan Civil War in 1462 and held captive in Barcelona until 1463. She was often present by her spouse in his campaigns on the royal side during the Civil War, such as during the Battle of Girona in 1467.
