= Aragonese Crusade =

13th-century military campaign

- Part of the Crusades and the War of the Sicilian Vespers
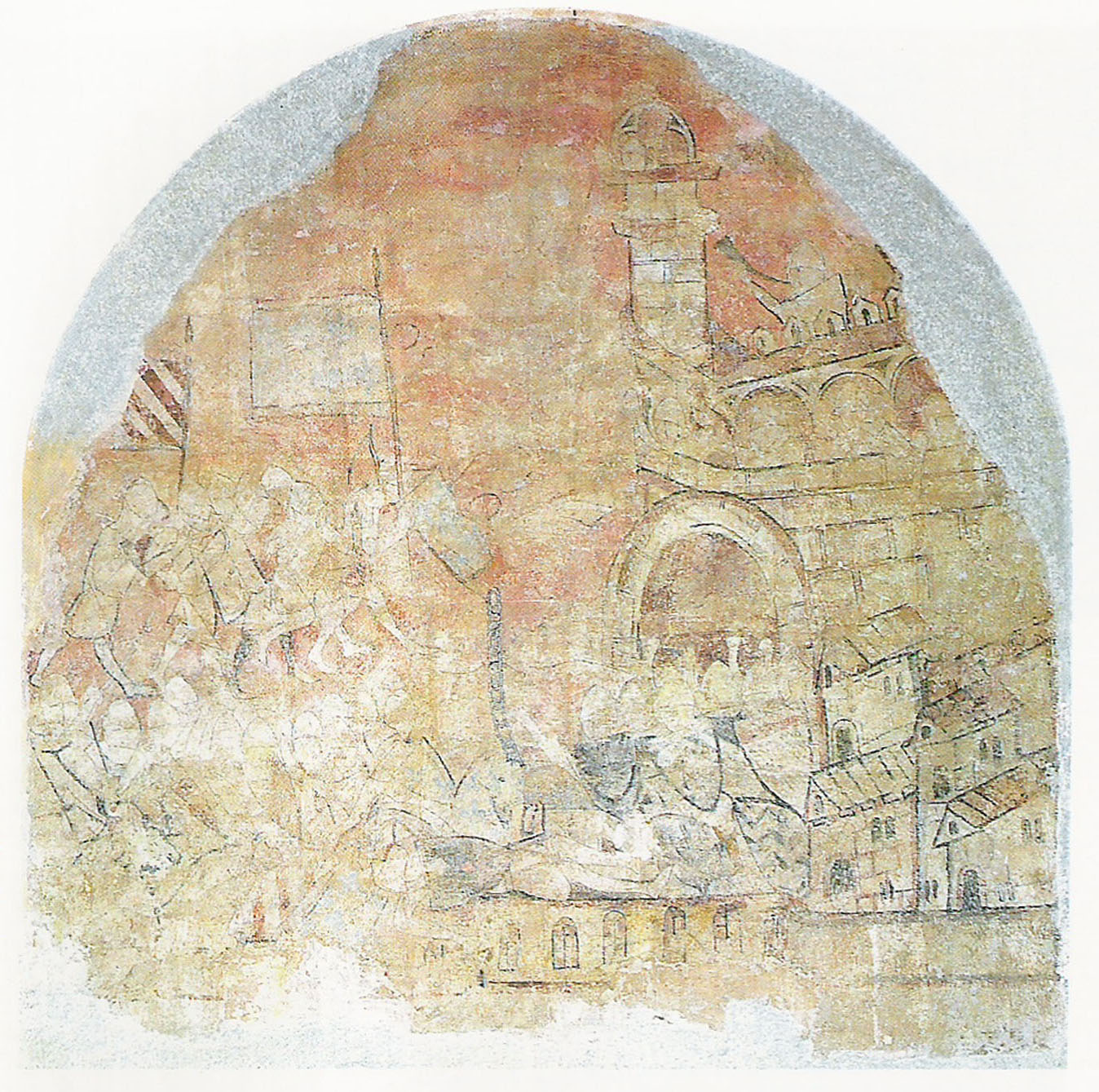
- A fresco from the Castle of Cardona depicting the Siege of Girona in 1285; now preserved in the Museu Nacional d'Art de Catalunya
Date	1284–1285
Location	Principality of Catalonia
Result	Aragonese victory

Belligerents
Kingdom of France; Kingdom of Mallorca; Kingdom of Navarre; Republic of Genoa	Crown of Aragon; Principality of Catalonia; Kingdom of Valencia

Commanders and leaders
Philip III of France # Charles of Valois; James II of Mallorca	Peter III of Aragon; Roger de Lauria

The Aragonese Crusade (1284–1285), also known as the Crusade of Aragon or Crusade against Catalonia, was a military venture waged by the Kingdom of France against the Crown of Aragon. Fought as an extension of the War of the Sicilian Vespers (1282–1302), the crusade was called by Pope Martin IV in retribution for Peter III of Aragon's intervention in Sicily, which had damaged the political ambitions of the papacy and France.

The Kingdom of France, aided by the Kingdom of Majorca, led the crusade. Despite domestic opposition to the crusade, Philip III of France invaded Catalonia in 1285. While the French saw some successes on land, the Aragonese navy won control of the sea, and a badly attritted French crusader army was forced to retreat in the fall of 1285. The defeat of the French army in 1285 effectively ended fighting, and Aragon would make peace with the pope by way of the 1291 Treaty of Tarascon.

== History ==
The crusade, a part of the larger War of the Sicilian Vespers, was declared by Pope Martin IV against King Peter III of Aragon in 1284 and 1285. Because of the recent conquest of Sicily by Peter, Martin declared a crusade against him and officially deposed him as king, on the grounds that Aragon was a papal fief: Peter's grandfather and namesake, Peter II, had surrendered the kingdom as a fief to the Holy See. Martin bestowed Aragon on Peter's nephew Count Charles of Valois, son of King Philip III of France.

The crusade soon caused civil war within Aragon, as Peter's brother, King James II of Majorca, joined the French. James had also inherited the County of Roussillon and thus stood between the dominions of the French and Aragonese monarchs. Peter had opposed James' inheritance as a younger son and reaped the consequence of such rivalry in the crusade.

Peter's eldest son, the future Alfonso III, was placed in charge of defending the border with Navarre, which was ruled by Philip III's son, Philip the Fair. Although Peter feared a full-scale invasion from Navarre, there were only some cross-border raids. The Navarrese king joined the main invading army under his father.

In 1284, the first French armies under Philip and Charles entered Roussillon. They included 16,000 cavalry, 17,000 crossbowmen, and 100,000 infantry, along with 100 ships in south French ports. Though they had James' support, the local populace rose against them. The city of Elne was valiantly defended by the so-called Bâtard de Roussillon (Bastard of Roussillon), the illegitimate son of Nuño Sánchez, late count of Roussillon (1212–1242). Eventually he was overcome and the cathedral was burned, despite the presence of papal legates, while the population was massacred, all save the Bâtard. He succeeded in negotiating his surrender and accompanied the advancing royal forces as a prisoner.

In 1285, Philip the Bold entrenched himself before Girona in an attempt to besiege it. The resistance was strong, but the city was taken. Charles was crowned there, but without an actual crown. On 28 April, Cardinal Jean Cholet placed his own hat on the count's head. For this, Charles was derisively but not unaffectionately nicknamed roi du chapeau ("king of the hat").

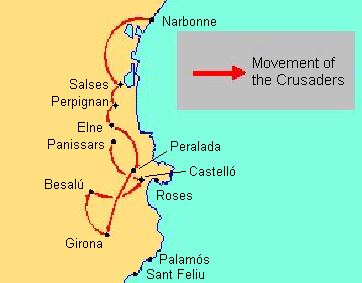
Progress of the Aragonese Crusaders

The French soon experienced a reversal, however, at the hands of Peter III's admiral, Roger de Lauria. The French fleet was defeated and destroyed at the Battle of Les Formigues, on the Catalan coast near to Palamós. As well, the French camp was hit hard by an epidemic of dysentery. Philip himself was afflicted. The heir to the French throne, Philip of Navarre, opened negotiations with Peter for free passage for the royal family through the Pyrenees. But the troops were not offered such passage and were decimated at the Battle of the Col de Panissars. The king of France himself died at Perpignan, the capital of James of Majorca, and was buried in Narbonne. Peter did not long survive him.

Historian H. J. Chaytor described the Aragonese Crusade as "perhaps the most unjust, unnecessary and calamitous enterprise ever undertaken by the Capetian monarchy." W. C. Jordan has blamed it for the young Philip's opposition to papal interference in French foreign policy upon his succession, which had long-reaching consequences for Europe. The crusade's legacy to France was slight, but Majorca was devastated as an independent polity. Alfonso III annexed Majorca, Ibiza, and Menorca in the following years. In 1295, the Treaty of Anagni returned the islands to James and the Treaty of Tarascon of 1291 officially restored Aragon to Alfonso and lifted the ban of the church.

== See also ==
- Mercadera – Catalan heroine
- Jean Priorat – Burgundian poet

== Sources ==
- Bisson, Thomas N. (1986). The Medieval Crown of Aragon: A Short History. Oxford: Clarendon.
- Chaytor, Henry J. (1933). A History of Aragon and Catalonia. London: Methuen.
- Cingolani, Stefano Maria (2009). "El comte Ponç Hug V i la invasió francesa de 1285". Mot So Razo. 8: 27–40. doi:10.33115/udg_bib/msr.v8i0.1452. hdl:10256/7277.
- Jordan, William C. (2003). Europe in the High Middle Ages. London: Viking. ISBN 9780670032020.
- Pasquier, Félix (1892). "Cession définitive du Val d'Aran à l'Aragon". Revue de Comminges. 7: 101–13.
- Runciman, Steven (1958). The Sicilian Vespers: A History of the Mediterranean World in the Later Thirteenth Century. Cambridge: Cambridge University Press.
- Strayer, Joseph R. (1953). "The Crusade against Aragon". Speculum. 28 (1): 102–13. doi:10.2307/2847183. JSTOR 2847183. S2CID 162708245.
- Strayer, Joseph R. (1969). "The Political Crusades of the Thirteenth Century" (PDF). In R. L. Wolff; H. W. Hazard (eds.). The Later Crusades, 1189–1311. A History of the Crusades, Volume, II. Madison, WI: University of Wisconsin Press. pp. 343–75. Archived from the original (PDF) on 13 March 2024.
- Strayer, Joseph R. (1980). The Reign of Philip the Fair. Princeton, NJ: Princeton University Press.
- Watt, J.A. (1999). "The papacy". In Abulafia, David; McKitterick, Rosamond (eds.). The New Cambridge Medieval History. Vol. 5, C.1198 – c.1300. Cambridge University Press.
