= Félix Béguinot =

French prelate

The Most Reverend Félix Béguinot
- Bishop of Nîmes
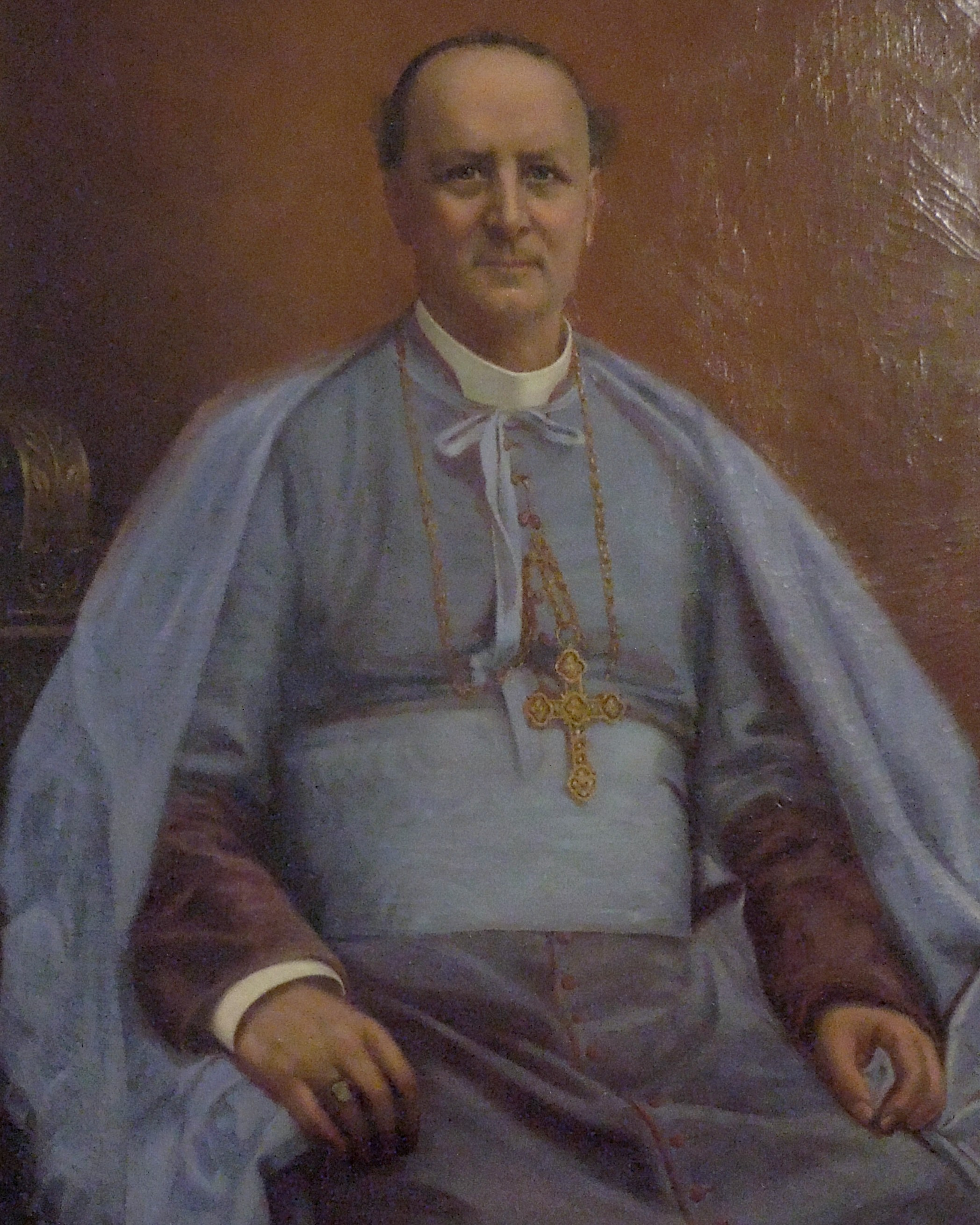
- Portrait of Béguinot by Louis Emile Pinel de Grandchamp, 1900
- Church: Roman Catholic Church
- See: Nîmes
- Appointed: 30 May 1896
- Term ended: 3 February 1921

Orders
- Ordination: 25 February 1860
- Consecration: 24 August 1896 by Cardinal Jean-Pierre Boyer; Bishop Stanislas Touchet; Bishop Claude Bardel

Personal details
- Born: Félix-Auguste Béguinot; 10/11 July 1836 Bannay, Cher, France
- Died: 3 February 1921 (age 84) Nîmes, Gard, France
- Education: Seminary of Bourges

Félix-Auguste Béguinot (10 or 11 July 1836 – 3 February 1921) was a French prelate of the Roman Catholic Church. He served as Bishop of Nîmes from 1896 to 1921.

== Biography ==
=== Early life and education ===
Félix-Auguste Béguinot was born, according to various sources, on either 10 or 11 July 1836, in Bannay, Cher, Centre, France. He was educated at the Seminary of Bourges and was ordained a priest of the Archdiocese of Bourges on 25 February 1860. By 1896, he was serving as Vicar General of the Archdiocese of Bourges.

=== Episcopacy ===
He was selected as Bishop of the Diocese of Nîmes on 30 May 1896, and was confirmed on 22 June of that same year. His episcopal consecration took place on 24 August 1896, with Archbishop of Bourges Cardinal Jean-Pierre Boyer serving as principal consecrator and Bishop Stanislas Touchet, Bishop of Orléans, and Bishop Claude Bardel, Auxiliary Bishop of Bourges, serving as co-consecrators. He was installed as Bishop of Nîmes on 8 September 1896.

An excellent and prolific orator, he strongly opposed the French government's laws that resulted in the closure of Catholic schools, confiscation of the property of and expulsion of religious orders, and the decreed separation of church and state. On 13 December he was driven from the diocesan headquarters, and he fled with many of the faithful to Rue Robert in Nîmes, where he died on 3 February 1921.

Throughout his episcopacy, he was principal consecrator of two bishops, Jean-Augustin Germain in 1897 and Jean-Charles Arnal du Curel in 1903. He served as co-consecrator of three bishops, Sébastien Herscher in 1900, Henri-Louis-Alfred Bouquet in 1901, and Honoré-Paul-Émile Halle in 1916.

== Episcopal lineage ==
- Bishop Francesco Ravizza
- Archbishop Veríssimo de Lencastre (1671)
- Bishop João de Sousa (1684)
- Bishop Álvaro de Abranches e Noronha (1694)
- Bishop Nuno da Cunha e Ataíde (1706)
- Cardinal Tomás de Almeida (1707)
- Cardinal João Cosme da Cunha, OCSA (1746)
- Archbishop Francisco da Assumpção e Brito, OSA (1773)
- Bishop Alexandre de Gouvea, TOR (1783)
- Bishop Cajetan Pires Pireira, CM (1806)
- Bishop Joachin Salvetti, OFM (1817)
- Bishop Giovanni Domenico Rizzolati, OFM (1840)
- Archbishop Théodore-Augustin Forcade (1847)
- Cardinal Jean-Pierre Boyer (1878)
- Bishop Félix Béguinot (1896)

== See also ==
- Catholic Church in France
