= Bertrand de Languissel =

French Catholic bishop

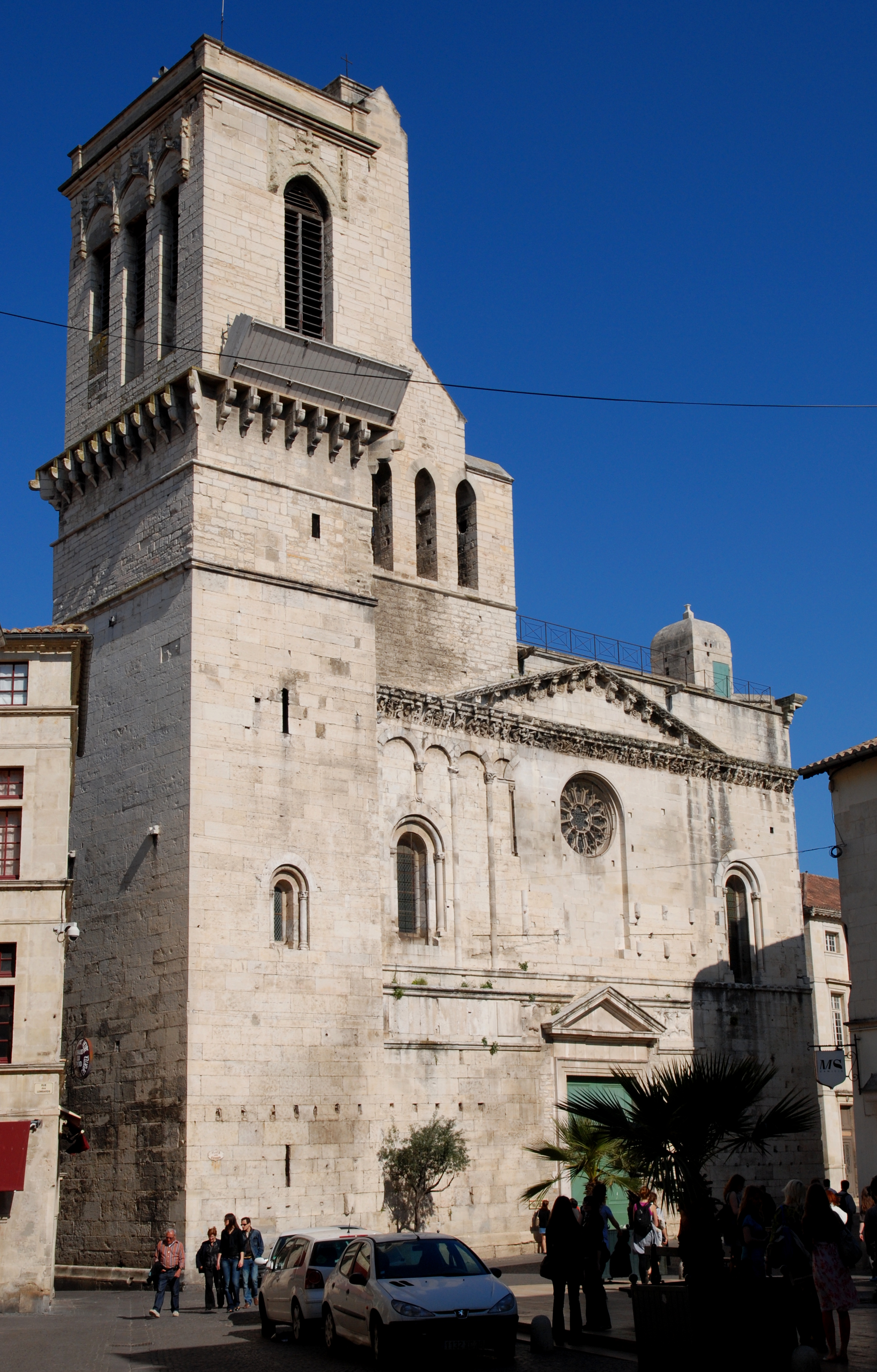
Nîmes Cathedral.

Bertrand de Languissel was an important 13th century Catholic Bishop in France.

His brother was Bernard de Languissel, Archbishop of Arles and Cardinal.

He was ordained Bishop of Nîmes on 6 October 1280 and held office until 8 January 1323 when he died in office.
