= Bernard d'Anduze =

Bernard d'Anduze was a bishop of Nîmes, France from 949 to 986.

== Background ==
He was part of the House of Anduze, owners of a large manor of Lower Languedoc, attested from the early tenth century. Bernard was the brother of Peter I, the first of the Lords of Anduze.

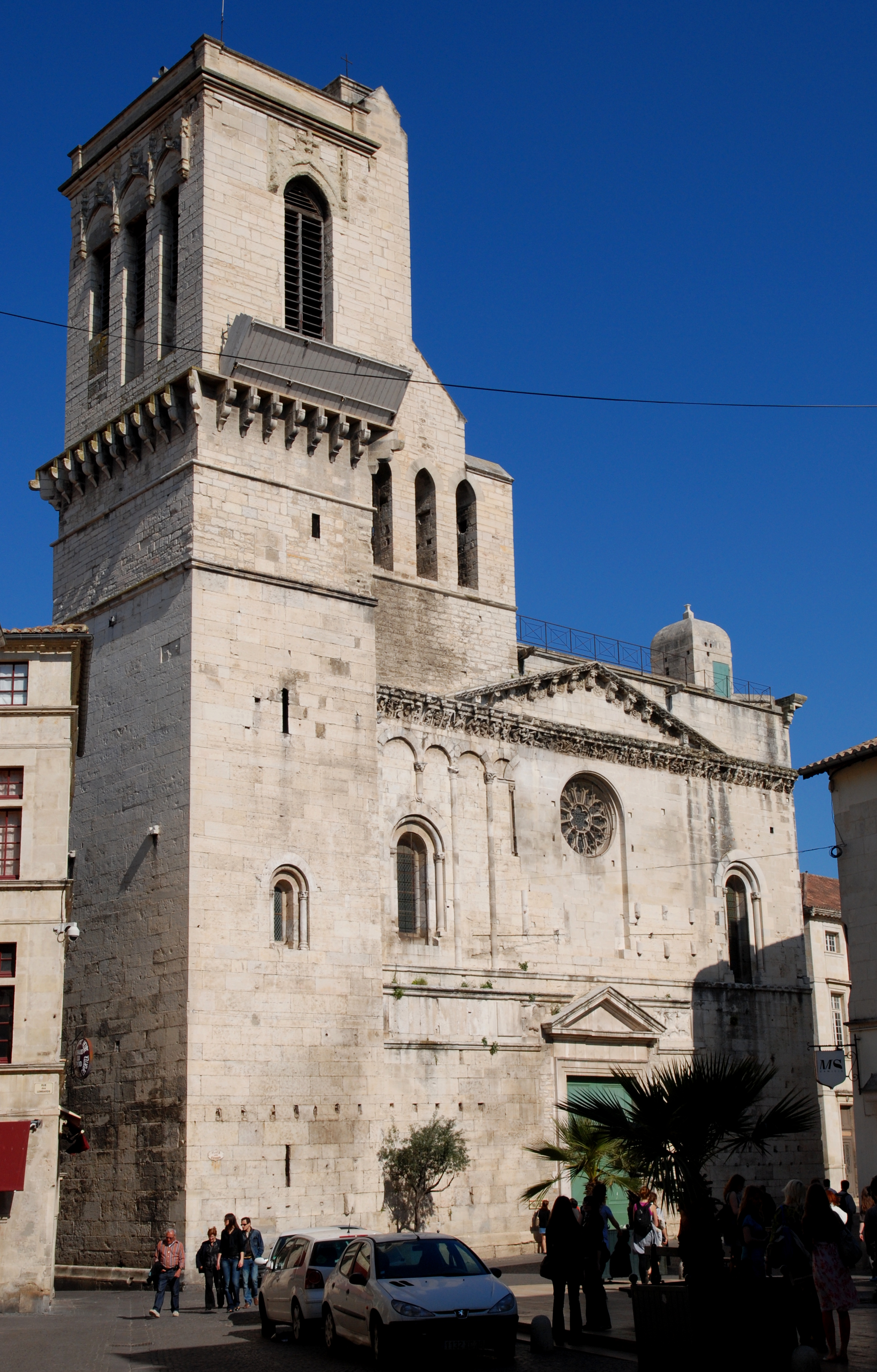
Nîmes Cathedral

Often episcopates in France at this time were often considered the heritage of a few powerful families and this is what we see in the episcopal see of Nimes. From the middle of the tenth century, the episcopal see of Nîmes is jointly controlled by the counts of Toulouse (masters County Nîmes) and the Trencavel (Viscount of Albi) . Until the end of the eleventh century, the seat of alternated between members of the family Trencavel and family members of Anduze. The bishop of Nîmes was then a rather powerful figure.

== Career ==
In the Episcopal catalog Bernard Anduze is designated twenty-second bishop, sitting between Bégon and Frotaire, son of Bernard the Viscount of Nimes.

On 7 July 971, he held a meeting where he held a trial between the count Raymond II and Amelius, Bishop of Agde, who were in conflict for the possession of the church of St. Martin and several villages in the County of Agde. Bernard and other judges decided in favor of Amelius. In 985, he increases the property of his church. Thus, the Archbishop of Arles gave him, freehold land at Saint-Etienne, in the county of Uzès, and the Church of St. Cézaire of Gauzignan. On 16 March 985, he gave count Sigismund a small clearing pasture that belonged to the Church of Our Lady, provided that the canons planted a vineyard which there would belong to Sigismund in his life and then revert to the church after Sigismund's death.

In his will, made donations to eighteen cathedrals, including Uzès and Nîmes. His son, Raymond II, with his mother, the Countess Berthe confirm these gifts and give to the Church of Our Lady, where Bernard chairs, a freehold located in Nîmes County in the territory of Aimargues and the Teillan coastline.

== See also ==
- Catholic Church in France
- Roman Catholic Diocese of Nîmes
