= Claude-Henri =

Claude-Henri is a French masculine given name, and may refer to:

- Claude-Henri Belgrand de Vaubois (1748–1839), French general
- Claude-Henri de Fusée de Voisenon (1708–1775), French dramatist and writer
- Claude-Henri Gorceix (1842–1919), French mineralogist
- Claude-Henri Grignon (1894–1976), Canadian novelist, journalist, and politician
- Claude-Henri Plantier (1813–1875), French theologian
- Claude-Henri Watelet (1718–1786), French printmaker
