= Jean Cadilhac =

French Catholic bishop

- Bishop of Nîmes
- Church: Catholic Church
- Diocese: Diocese of Nîmes
- In office: 16 March 1978 – 27 October 1999
- Predecessor: Pierre-Marie Rougé
- Successor: Robert Wattebled
- Previous posts: Titular Bishop of Segermes (1973-1978); Auxiliary Bishop of Avignon (1973-1978)

Orders
- Ordination: 29 June 1955
- Consecration: 14 October 1973 by Roger Tort

Personal details
- Born: Jean Lucien Marie Joseph Cadilhac; 11 October 1931 Fraisse-Cabardès, Aude, France
- Died: 27 October 1999 (aged 68)

Monseigneur Jean Cadilhac (11 October 1931 – 27 October 1999) was the Bishop of Nimes, France.

== Life ==
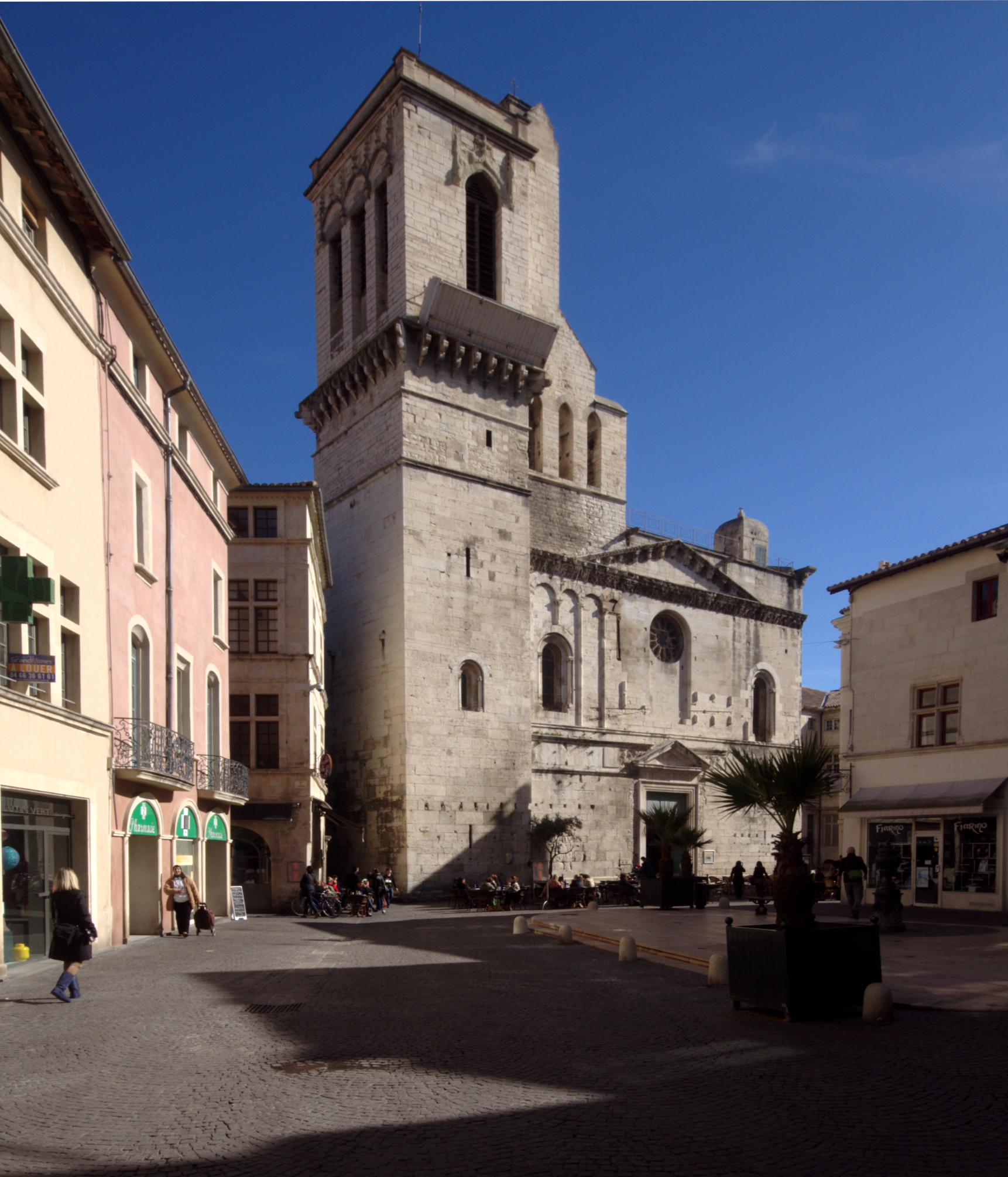
Nimes Cathedral

Cadilhac was born in 1931 at Fraisse-Cabardès and studied at the Collège Saint Théodard where he finished 6th in his class. He continued his classical studies at the Petit Séminaire of Montauban from 1949 to 1955. He was ordained a priest for the Diocese of Montauban on 29 June 1955 and appointed Auxiliary Bishop of Avignon and Titular Bishop of Segermes in September 1973. He was made Bishop of Nîmes in March 1978 and he died 27 October 1999. Throughout his career he was a chaplain to the Rural Movement of Christian Youth.

== Written works ==
- Notes Pastorales de Monseigneur Jean Cadilhac 1978-1998 (Broché – 1998)

== See also ==
- Catholic Church in France
