= Segermes =

- سجرماس، هنشير الحارات ببوعشير
- Henchir Harat
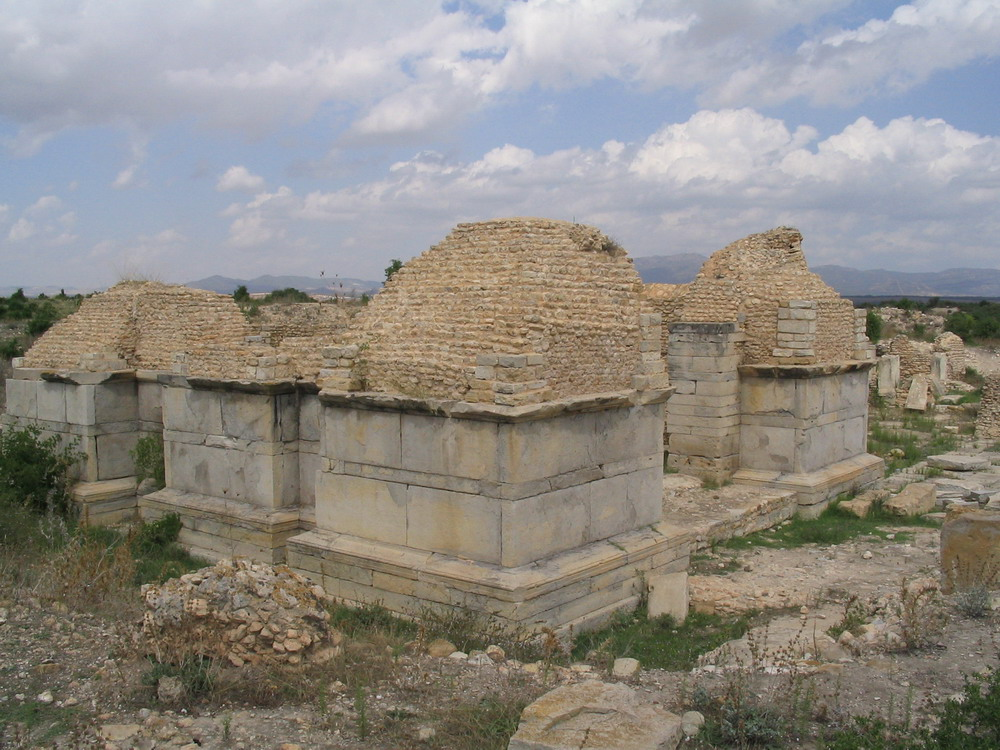
- Archaeological ruins at Segermès

- Location within Tunisia
- 36°20′43″N 10°18′03″E
- Type: Archaeological site
- Periods: Antiquity, Late antiquity
- Cultures: Carthaginians, Roman, Byzantine
- Satellite of: Carthage, Roman Empire, Byzantine Empire
- Associated with: Carthaginians, Romans, Byzantines
- Location: Near Bou Ficha, Tunisia
- Region: Zaghouan Governorate

History
- Built: c. 3rd century B.C. (Carthaginian foundation)
- Abandoned: c. 7th century A.D.

Site notes
- Material: Limestone, mortar
- Area: 30 hectares
- Excavation dates: Multi-period surface surveys and field investigations (notably the Danish Segermes project in the 1980s)
- Archaeologists: Søren Dietz, Jesper Carlsen
- Condition: Ruined
- Management: Agency for the Development of National Heritage and Cultural Promotion (AMVPPC)
- Public access: Yes
- Features the ruins of a Forum, a public square, large water reservoirs, and two distinct ancient Christian churches (one with a preserved baptismal font).

Segermes is an ancient town in Tunisia. Under the Roman Empire, the town belonged to the province of Byzacena. The town is identified with ruins at Henchir Harat, Zaghouan.

The ruins are located 20 km south-east of Zaghouan (the Roman Zica) and about 38 km south-west of the city of Nabeul (the Roman Neapolis).

== Description ==
Located on a shallow land, in the center of a rich peasant village on the outskirts of the village of Boucher, from the Mausoleum of Zeribah, and on the ancient Roman road of Sousse (the Roman Hadrumetum), it is surrounded by a large number of mountains that provide visual and natural protection.

== Archaeology ==
The historical site is the most important archaeological site in the state of Zaghouan. It has a relatively large area, estimated at thirty (30) hectares. Historical and archeological data confirm the richness of this area with the archaeological stock left by successive civilizations from the Carthaginians and Romans to the Byzantines.

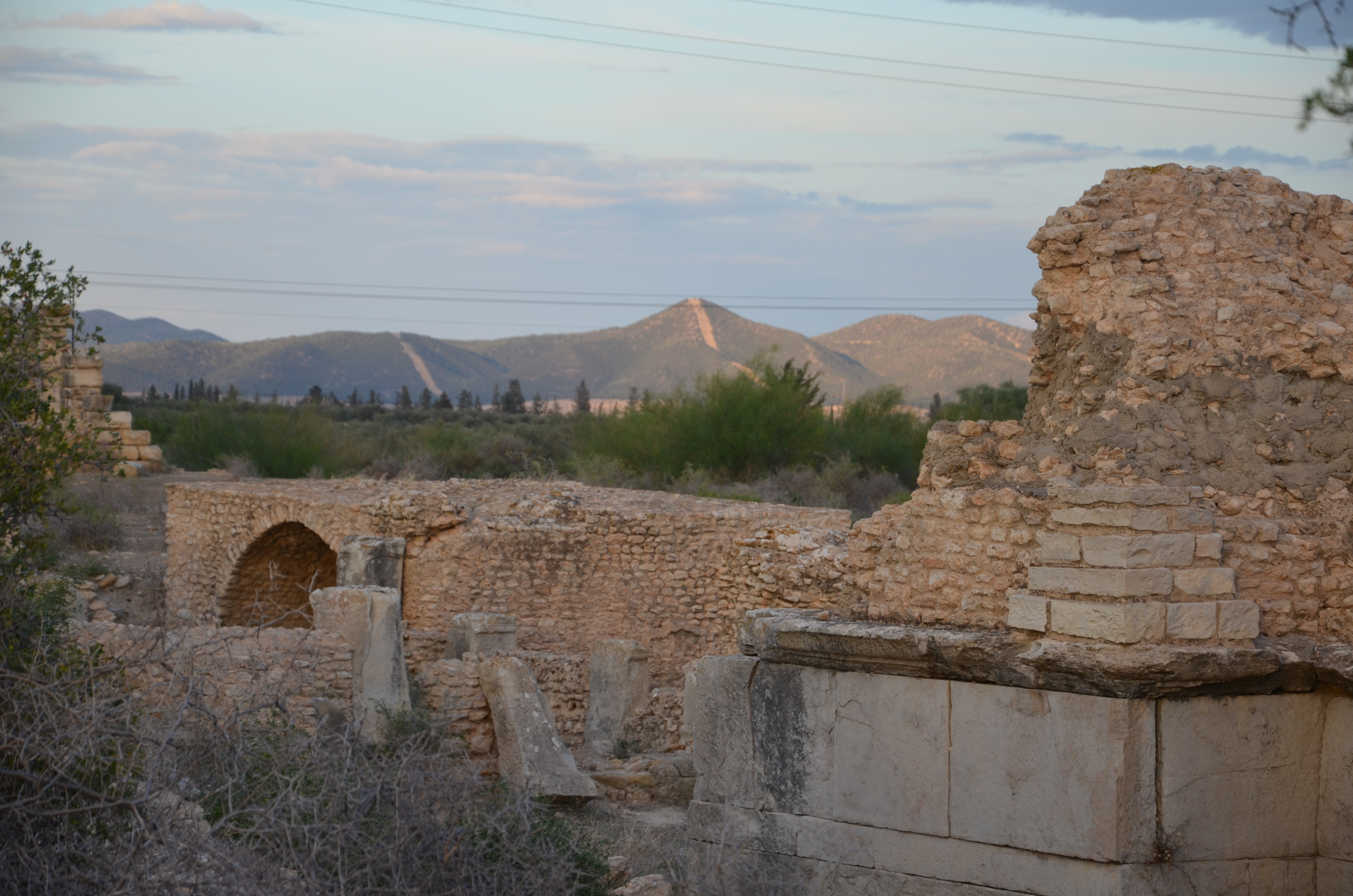
ruins at Henchir Haarat

The city has an important and unique architectural center, of which one can distinguish a capital built in the heart of the city around a spacious courtyard around the "Forum" in the center of public life. Also, a large public square opened by the majority of religious and public services and two bathrooms (winter bath and summer) and two churches and two old tombs and also site several large water reservoirs and water channels are found.

The origins of the town are said in legend to be based on the location of a mythical falcon.

== Bishopric ==
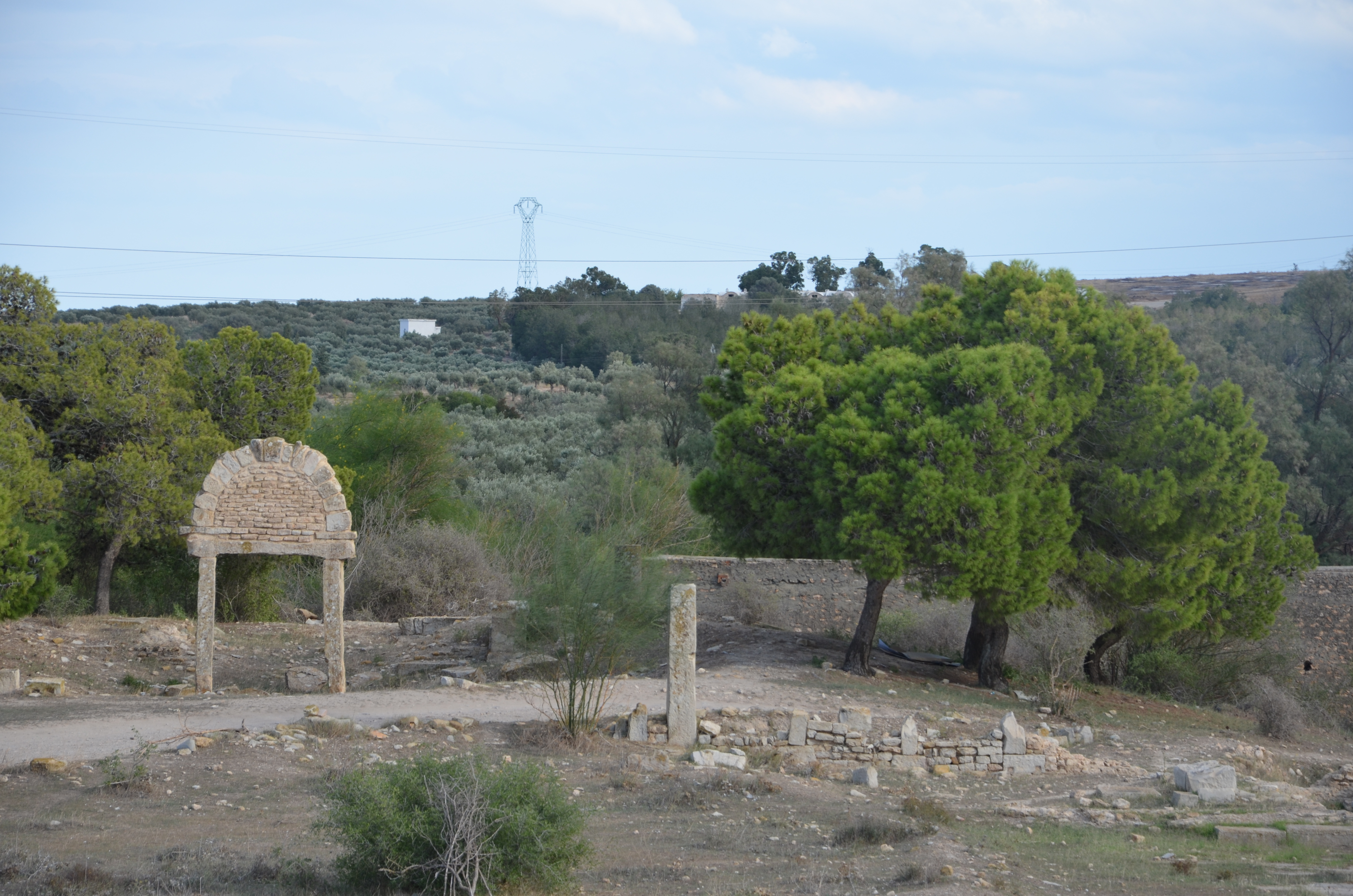
Ruins of a church building at Segermes.

Segermes is an ancient bishopric of the Roman province of Byzacena. While it is no longer a residential see, it is included in the Catholic Church's list of titular sees. As of 2007 the titular bishop of the see is Josef Clemens, former secretary of the Pontifical Council for the Laity.

There are five documented bishops of Segermes.

- Nicomedes took part in the council held in Carthage in 256 by St. Cyprian to discuss the question concerning the lapses.
- At the Carthage conference of 411, which saw together the Catholic and Donatist bishops of Roman Africa, the Catholic Felice and the Donatist Restituto took part.
- Another bishop named Restituto was present at the synod gathered in Carthage by the Vandal king of Hungary in 484.
- Finally, a Felix II intervened at the antimonothelite council of 641.

The city has the ruins of two church buildings.

- The First Church: Located in the heart of the city, its main entrance is still standing to the point of history and opens its main door, which is topped by an arch on the public square and the ruins of its outer walls remain clear and clear.
- The Second Church: Located in the same area and another archaeological site hundreds of meters away, and the land of a special (Busta estate) and show the ruins in the form of semi-round and the floor covered with many mosaics and a large baptismal church connected to the church, and in the form of a cross of several degrees, It is simple to build and does not contain embellishments or inscriptions, and through the width of the basin and its depth seems to be designed.

=== Diocesan bishops ===
The names of some of the bishops of the see are known:

- Nicomedes (mentioned in 255)
- Felix (mentioned in 411)
  - Restitutus (a Donatist mentioned in 411)
- Restutus (mentioned in 484)
- Felix (mentioned in 641)

=== Titular bishops ===
- Luigi Rovigatti (23 May 1966 - 10 February 1973 appointed archbishop of Acquaviva)
- Jean-Lucien-Marie-Joseph Cadilhac (5 September 1973 - 16 March 1978 appointed bishop of Nîmes)
- Renato Raffaele Martino (September 14, 1980 - October 21, 2003 appointed cardinal deacon of San Francesco di Paola ai Monti)
- Josef Clemens, from 25 November 2003
