= Geraldus d'Anduze =

French prelate

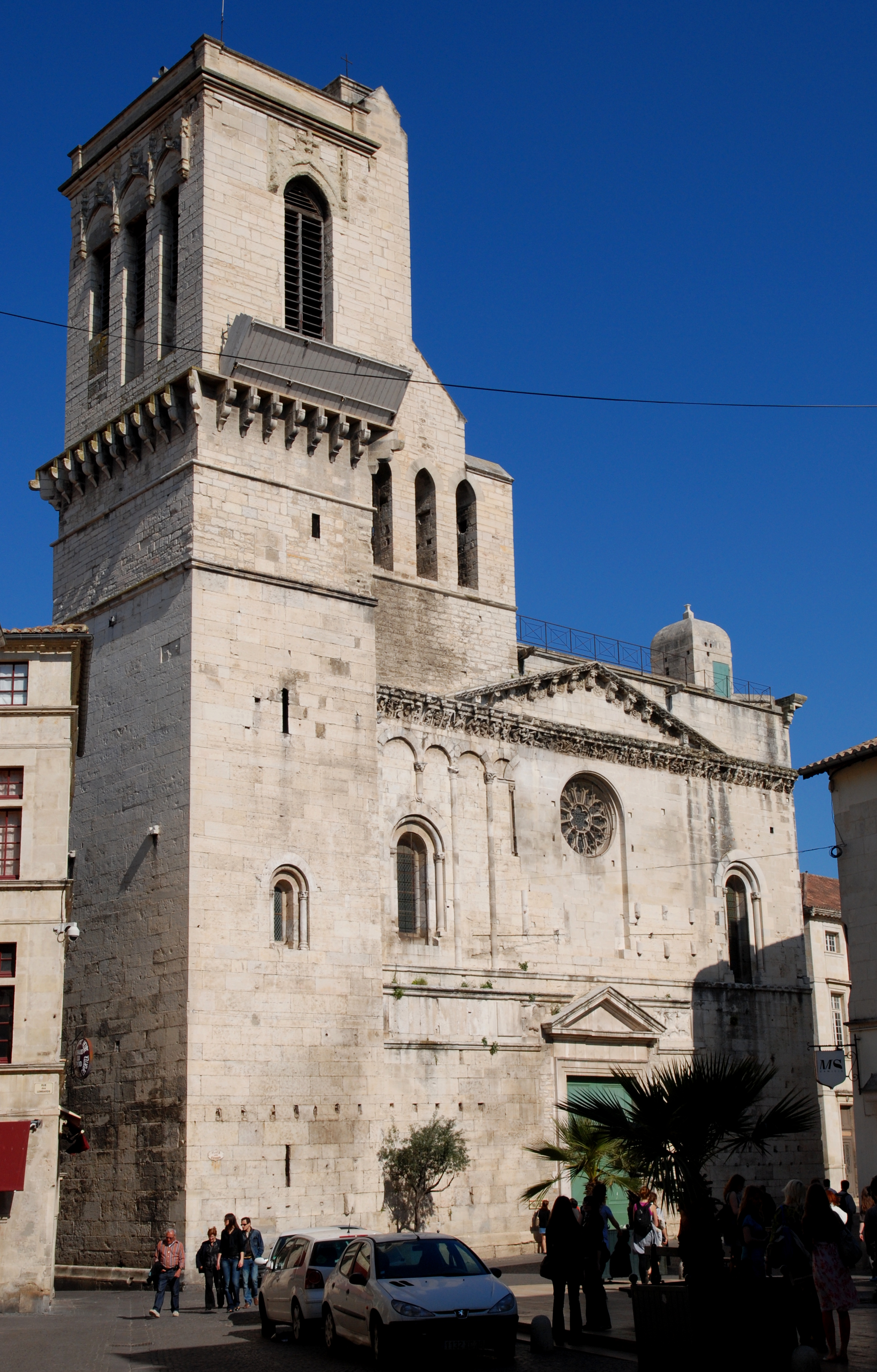
Nîmes Cathedral.

Geraldus d'Anduze (Géraud d'Anduze) was a French prelate, bishop of Nîmes in the eleventh century.

Geraldus was the son of Bernard Pelet, Lord of Anduze, and of Ermengarde, his first wife. He was a member of the Anduze family, one of the oldest in Languedoc. His brother Fredol was bishop of Puy.

Like his predecessor Frotaire I, Geraldus gave much attention to the reconstruction of Psalmody Abbey, which regained its former lustre through the virtues of the religious and the munificence of the laity. During his time, the abbey was granted jurisdiction over an abbey at Saint-Geniez.

== See also ==
- Catholic Church in France
- Roman Catholic Diocese of Nîmes
