= Felix of Nîmes =

4th-century French bishop and martyr

Saint Felix of Nîmes is honored as a 4th-century bishop and martyr from Nîmes, France. His feast day is 27 July.

There was a see at Nîmes as early as 396, when a synodical letter was sent by a Council of Nîmes to the bishops of Gaul. Jules Igolin writes that Nîmes became the site of a bishopric by the fourth century and that its first bishop was Saint Felix of Nîmes (St Félix), who was martyred around 407AD. Other writers also affirm that a certain St. Felix was Bishop of Nîmes and martyred by the Vandals about 407, but Louis Duchesne questions this.

Felix is said to have been succeeded by Sedatus who had served under him. The first bishop whose date is positively known is Sedatus, was present at the Council of Agde in 506. Sedatus was prélat of Nimes until c.506AD.
