= Eléfant of Nîmes =

French medieval bishop coadjutor

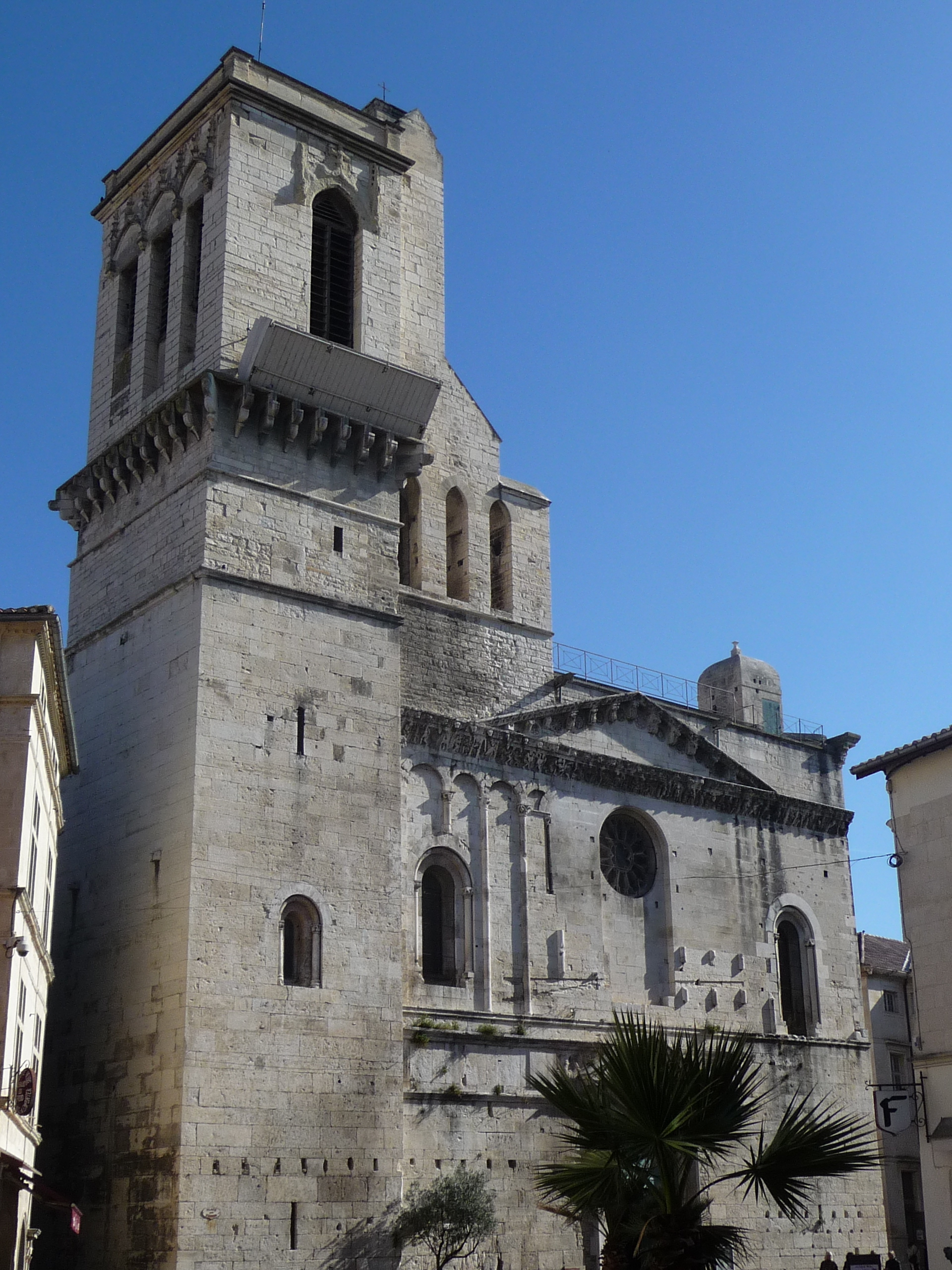
File:Cathédrale Notre-Dame de Nîmes.

Elefant of Nîmes was a medieval bishop coadjutor of the Diocese of Nîmes from 1066, He was coadjudicator for his first 11 years with Frotaire II, sole bishop for 4 years and then shared the see with Pierre Ermangaud for his last four years.

== See also ==
- Catholic Church in France
