= Robert Wattebled =

French prelate

Robert Léon Wattebled
- Bishop Emeritus of Nîmes
- Church: Catholic Church
- Diocese: Diocese of Nîmes
- In office: 30 January 2001 – 10 August 2021
- Predecessor: Jean Cadilhac
- Successor: Nicolas Brouwet

Orders
- Ordination: 26 May 1974 by Gérard-Maurice Eugène Huyghe
- Consecration: 1 April 2001 by Jean-Paul Jaeger

Personal details
- Born: 5 June 1946 (age 80) Calais, Pas-de-Calais, France

Robert Wattebled is a French prelate of the Catholic Church who was the bishop of Nîmes from 2001 to 2021.

== Biography ==
Robert Wattebled was born on 5 June 1946 in Calais. He earned a degree in mathematics and then entered the Major Seminary of Arras in Lille where he studied philosophy and theology.

He earned a joint doctorate in theology at the Catholic Institute in Paris and the history of religions at the Paris-Sorbonne University.

He served his required period of national service in Cameroon. He was ordained a priest of the Diocese of Arras on 26 May 1974. He served for nine years as curate and pastor of Saint-Laurent-Blangy and then from 1986 to 1992 in Bully-Grenay. He was episcopal vicar from 1990 to 1996, and then vicar general with responsibility for liturgy, instruction, and communications.

Pope John Paul II appointed him bishop of Nîmes on 30 January 2001. He was consecrated a bishop and installed in a ceremony held in the Arena of Nîmes on 1 April. Following the major floods in the Gard and its surroundings, Wattebled called for generosity stating that "our fraternal solidarity is divine likeness ".

His Episcopal motto is "Because of Jesus, for many". He was made a Knight of the Legion of Honor on 18 April 2014.

He submitted his resignation as required when he turned 75, and Pope Francis accepted it on 10 August. Wattebled planned to remain active in retirement in his native Calais.

== See also ==
- Catholic Church in France
- List of the Roman Catholic dioceses of France
