= Adalbert d'Uzès =

French bishop

Aldebert d'Uzès et de Posquières or Adalbert d'Uzès et de Posquières was a bishop of Nîmes from 1141 to 1180. He was the son of Raymond Décan de Posquières d'Uzès and Marie d'Uzès. During his long reign, he sought to oppose the growth of Catharism within his diocese. In 1165 he was one of the participants in the debate between Catholics and Cathars at Lombers.

== Bibliography ==
- Barber M., Katarzy, Warszawa 2005, ISBN 83-06-02923-2.
