= Gilbert de Nîmes =

Roman Catholic bishop

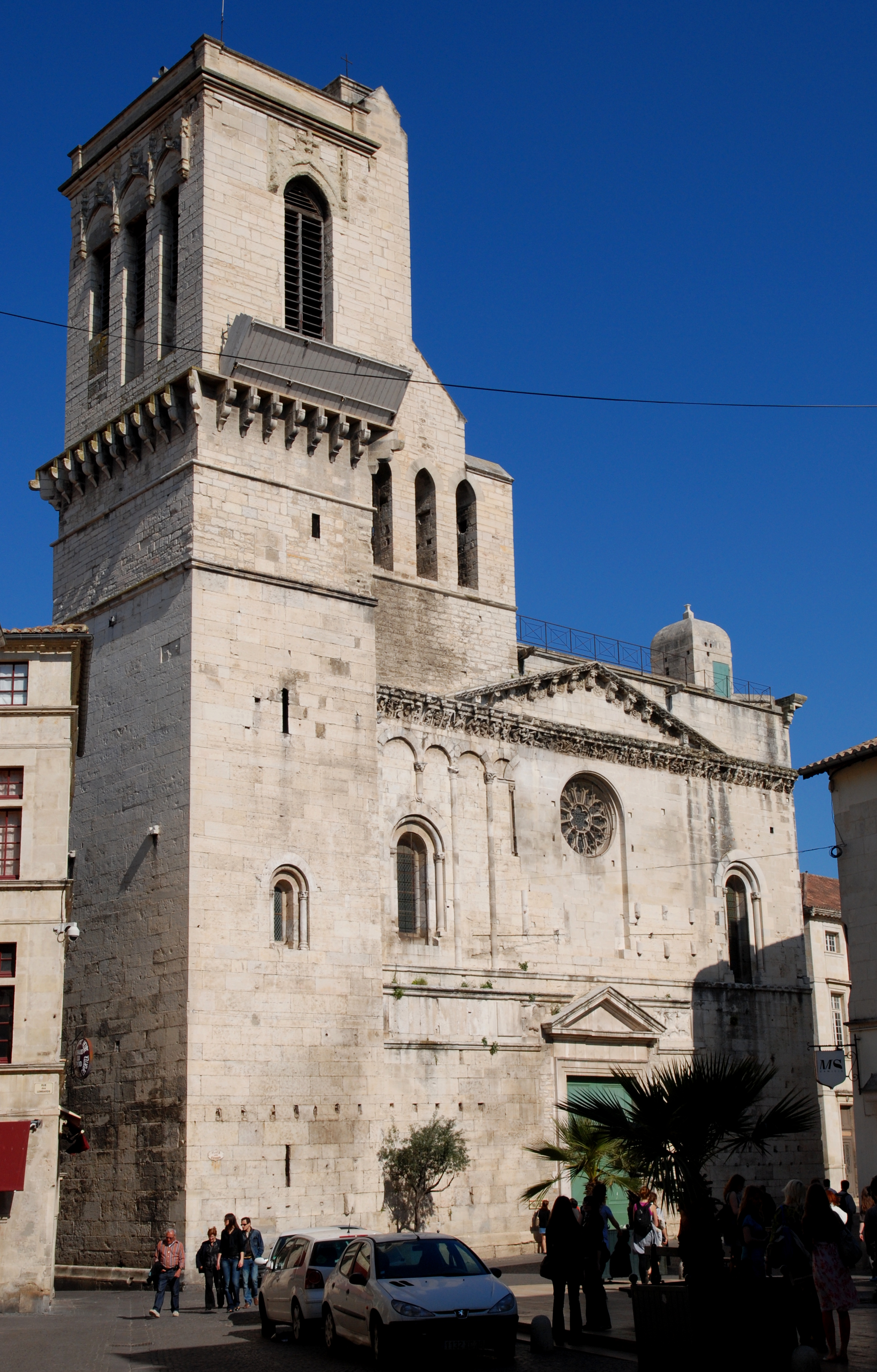
Nîmes Cathedral

Gilbert de Nîmes was a prelate of the Roman Catholic Church in France during the Dark Ages, and the sixteenth known bishop of Nimes, 870–890.

During his Bishopric, from 876, he led a process that retrieved the village of Bizac (now part of the municipality of Calvisson) to the diocese of Nîmes as it had been usurped by the Lord Genesis, in 892.

Later, with the help of John VIII, he captured the Abbey of Saint-Gilles which had been with the Abbé Léon. They begged for the help of John VIII, who then convened a synod. It ordered Gilbert to surrender his property to Father Leo.
