= Josef Clemens =

German bishop

The Most Reverend Josef Clemens
- Secretary Emeritus of the Pontifical Council for the Laity
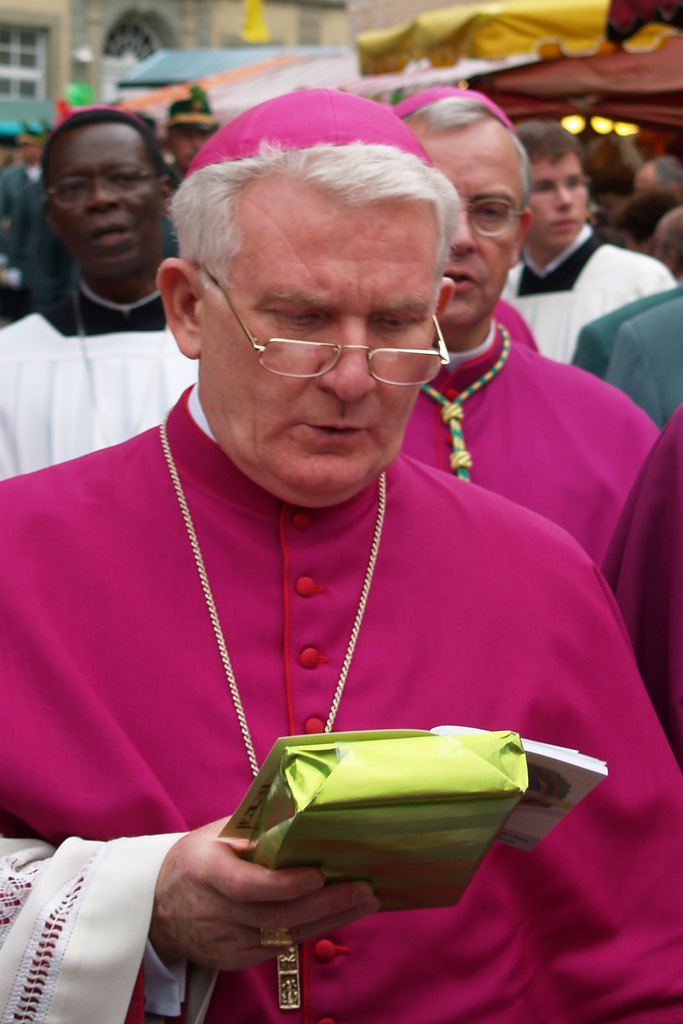
- Clemens in Paderborn (2007).
- Church: Roman Catholic Church
- Appointed: 25 November 2003
- Term ended: 1 September 2016
- Predecessor: Stanisław Ryłko
- Other post: Titular Bishop of Segermes (2003-)

Orders
- Ordination: 10 October 1975 by Hermann Volk
- Consecration: 6 January 2004 by Joseph Aloisius Ratzinger

Personal details
- Born: Josef Clemens; 20 June 1947 (age 79) Siegen, Germany
- Education: Collegium Germanicum et Hungaricum; Pontifical Gregorian University
- Motto: Clementia tua Domine
- Coat of arms

Styles of Josef Clemens
- Reference style: The Most Reverend
- Spoken style: Your Excellency
- Religious style: Monsignor

Josef Clemens (born 20 June 1947 in Siegen) is a German bishop. He was Secretary of the Pontifical Council for the Laity from November 2003 until it ceased operations on 1 September 2016. He was personal secretary to Cardinal Joseph Ratzinger (later Pope Benedict XVI) from 1984 to 2003.

== Biography ==
Josef Clemens was born on 20 June 1947 in Siegen in the Archdiocese of Paderborn. He received his secondary-level education in the Collegium Marianum in Neuss and studied theology at the Collegium Germanicum in Rome, where Cardinal Hermann Volk ordained him to the priesthood on 10 October 1975 in the church of Sant'Ignazio. He studied moral theology at the Gregorian University, obtaining a licentiate in 1976.

Returning to Germany, he was substitute parish vicar at St. John the Baptist in Bielefeld-Schildesche from 1976 to 1977; parish vicar at St. Joseph of Dortmund from 1977 to 1980; and then taught religion at the Max Planck high school in Dortmund from 1978 to 1980. He spent the next four years working on his doctoral thesis at the Collegio Teutonico and received his doctorate in moral theology from the Gregorian in 1984.

He then joined the Roman Curia as first secretary and then, before the end of 1984, study assistant of the Congregation for the Doctrine of the Faith with the role of personal secretary to the prefect of the congregation, Cardinal Joseph Ratzinger, the future Pope Benedict XVI. He was given the rank of Chaplain of His Holiness on 17 March 1989 and that of Honorary Prelate of His Holiness in 1999.

On 12 February 2003, Pope John Paul II appointed Clemens Under-Secretary of the Congregation for Institutes of Consecrated Life and Societies of Apostolic Life. On 25 November of the same year, he was appointed Secretary of the Pontifical Council for the Laity and Titular Bishop of Segermes. He received his episcopal ordination on 6 January 2004 from Cardinal Ratzinger. As Secretary of the Pontifical Council for the Laity, he organized several World Youth Day celebrations: Cologne (2005), Sydney (2008), Madrid (2011), Rio de Janeiro (2013) and Krakow (2016). He also organized two world conferences of Catholic lay organizations in Rome in 2006 and 2014.

His tenure at the Pontifical Council for the Laity ended when that body was suppressed and its functions taken over by the newly established Dicastery for the Laity, Family and Life on 1 September 2016. On 1 June 2018, the new dicastery issued its report on the Church and sport, which had been years in development under Clemens.

In November 2020, Clemens was named papal delegate to Klosterneuburg Monastery in Austria, an Augustinian institution troubled by charges of sexual abuse. He became responsible for the monastery's 40 canons, 24 parishes, and extensive property holdings and finances.
