= Soliers =

- Commune
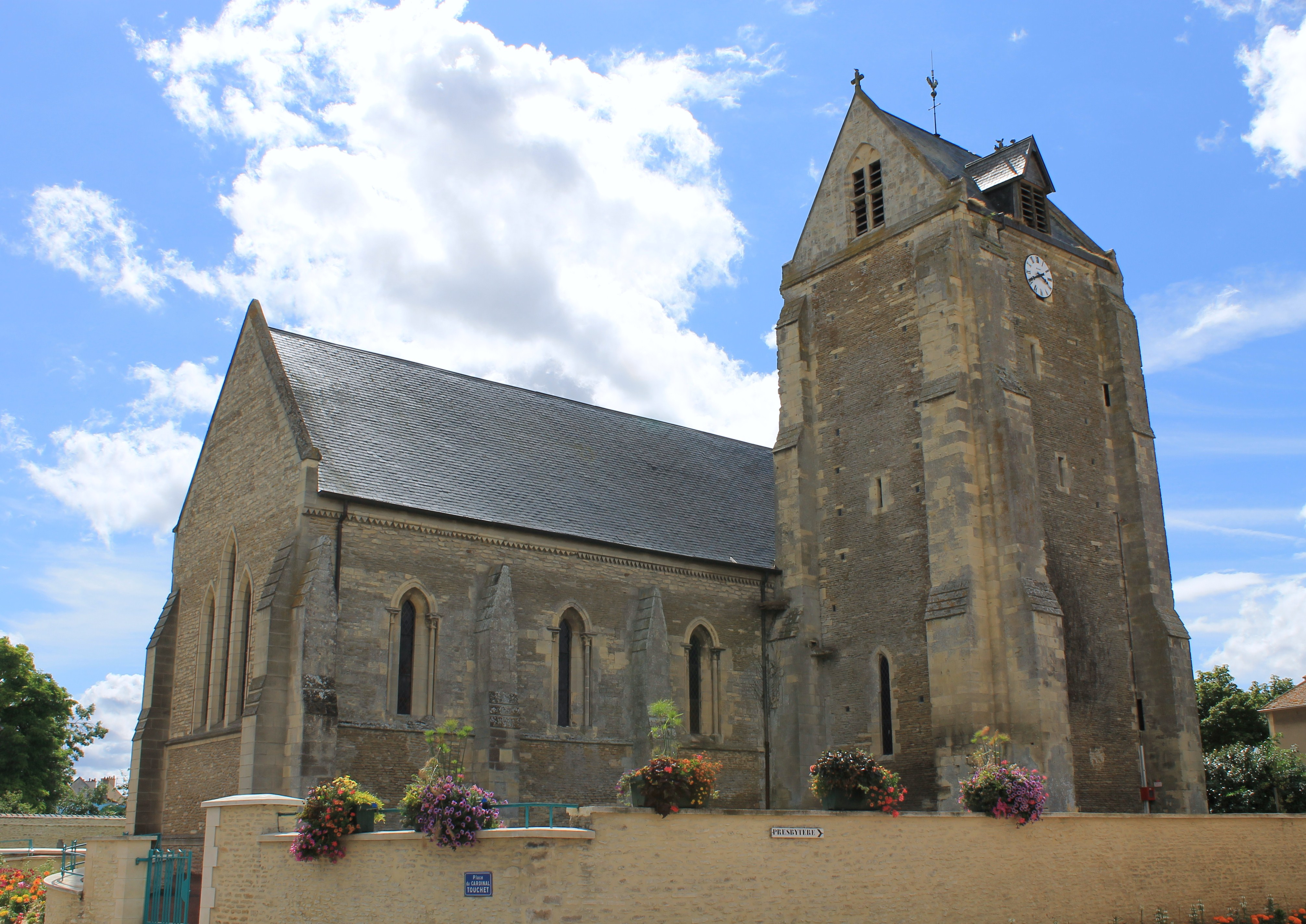
- The church in Soliers
- Location of Soliers
- Location within France Location within Normandy
- Coordinates: 49°08′08″N 0°17′39″W
- Country: France
- Region: Normandy
- Department: Calvados
- Arrondissement: Caen
- Canton: Évrecy
- Intercommunality: CU Caen la Mer

Government
  - Mayor (2024–2026): Philippe Jouin
- Area^{1}: 5.08 km^{2} (1.96 sq mi)
- Elevation: 26 m (85 ft)
- Highest elevation: 53 m (174 ft)
- Lowest elevation: 27 m (89 ft)
- Population (2023): 2,260
  - Density: 445/km^{2} (1,150/sq mi)
- Time zone: UTC+01:00 (CET)
  - Summer (DST): UTC+02:00 (CEST)
- INSEE/Postal code: 14675 /14540
- ^{1} French Land Register data, which excludes lakes, ponds, glaciers > 1 km^{2} (0.386 sq mi or 247 acres) and river estuaries.

Soliers (French pronunciation: [sɔlje]) is a commune in the Calvados department in the Normandy region in northwestern France.

== Geography ==
The commune is made up of the following collection of villages and hamlets, Four and Soliers.

== Population ==
Historical population
Year	Pop.	±% p.a.
1968	541	—
1975	695	+3.64%
1982	1,053	+6.12%
1990	1,625	+5.57%
1999	1,733	+0.72%
2007	2,135	+2.64%
2012	2,155	+0.19%
2017	2,070	−0.80%
2023	2,260	+1.47%
Source: INSEE

== Points of Interest ==
=== National Heritage sites ===
- Église Saint-Vigor de Soliers thirteenth century church listed as a Monument historique in 1927.

== Notable people ==
- Stanislas Touchet (1842 - 1926) a prelate of the Roman Catholic Church who served as Bishop of Orléans from 1894 until his death, and became a cardinal in 1922 was born here.

== Twin towns – sister cities ==
Soliers is twinned with:

- Ipplepen, England, United Kingdom, since 1986.
- Krombach, Germany, since 1996

== See also ==
- Communes of the Calvados department
