= Pierre Ermangaud =

French Catholic bishop

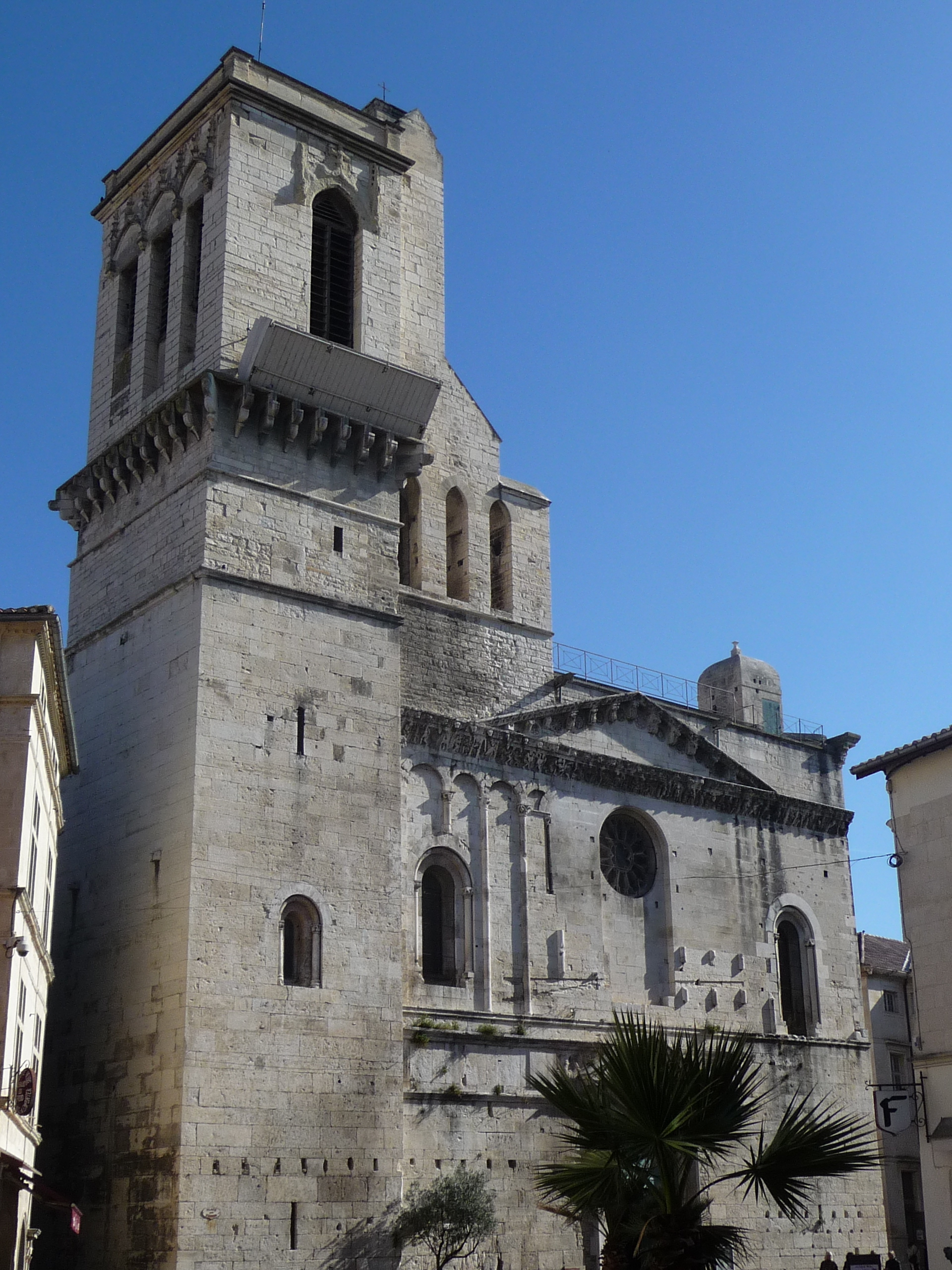
Cathédrale of Nîmes.

Pierre Ermangaud was an 11th-century medieval Bishop of Nîmes, France. He was for a while coadjutor with his predecessor Eléfant of Nîmes, however, on the death of Eléfant was sole Bishop.

In 1090 or 1091 he hosted the Second Council of Nimes, which forbade girls to marry before the age of twelve years and ruled against the priests who would live in public concubinage.
