= Bernard de Languissel =

French Catholic cardinal (died 1291)

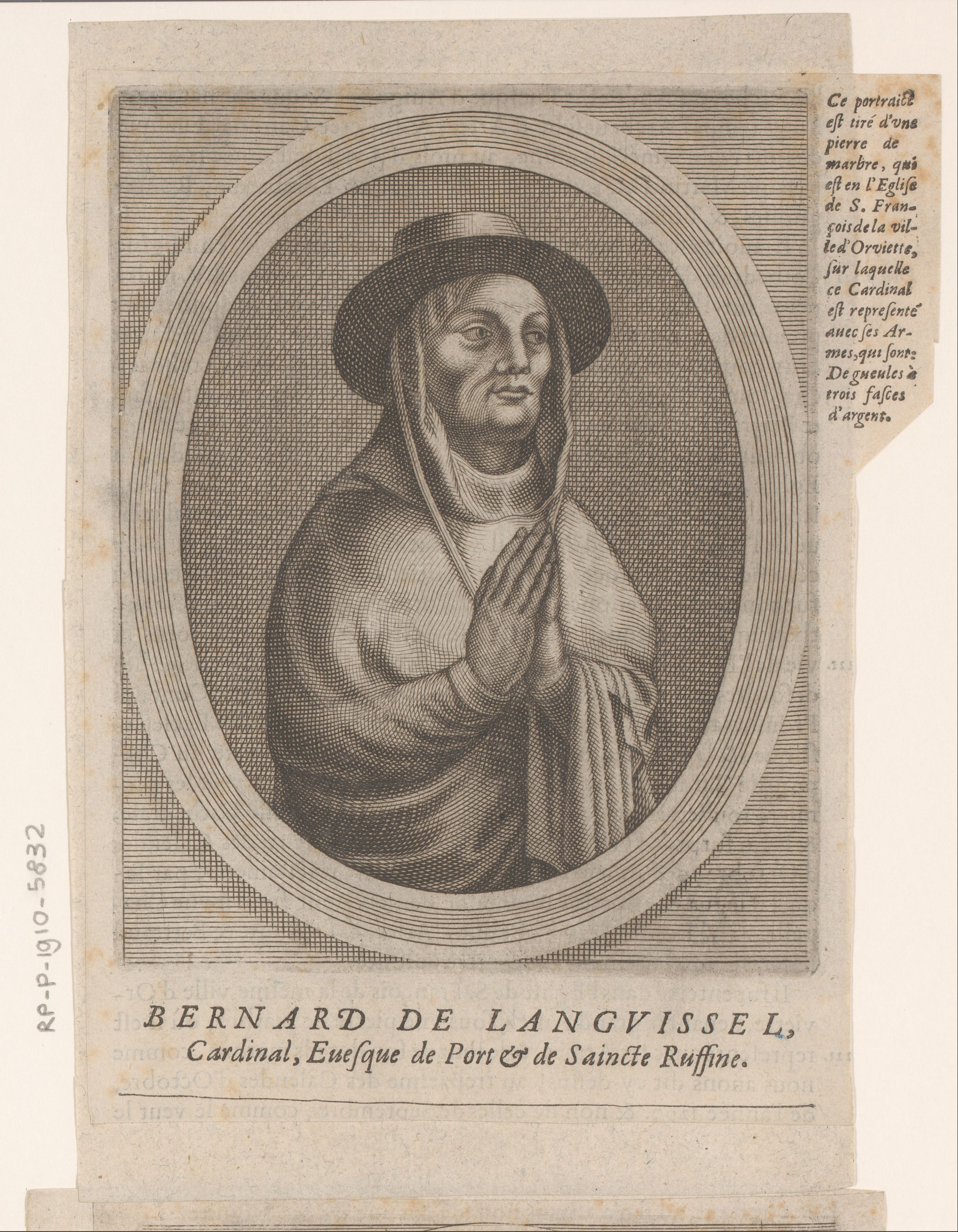
Portrait of Bernard de Languissel

Bernard de Languissel (Nîmes, c. 1240 – Orvieto, 23 July 1291) was a French Catholic cardinal and archbishop.

== Biography ==
Bernard (called Bernard II) de Languissel was born into a noble family of Nîmes. His uncle, André de Languissel, was provost and his brothers André and Bertrand became bishops, one of Avignon and the other of Nîmes.

Bernard de Languissel became Archbishop of Arles on 4 February 1274, during the pontificate of Pope Gregory X, and presided over the councils of Arles in 1275 and Avignon in 1279.

In 1281 Pope Martin IV appointed him Cardinal Bishop of Porto-Santa Rufina, also appointing him his Papal legate in Piedmont.

On 5 November 1286, he received the administration of the church of Santa Prassede. He was constituted protector of the Order of the Hermits of Saint Augustine on 30 June 1288 and Papal legate in Lombardy and in Tuscany. In 1289 while in Rome, on the occasion of the death of the Archbishop of Marseille, Raymond of Nîmes, he intervened with Pope Nicholas IV to recommend a person close to him, Durand de Trésémines.

According to the Spanish Dominican historian, Ciaconio, he died in 1290, but the episcopal lists give 23 July 1291. Other sources mention 1294. In any case, it is certain that he died in Orvieto, after having left a legacy to the Cathedral of Saint-Trophime in Arles, with the obligation to erect a chapel in honor of Saint Peter.

=== Conclaves ===
During his period as cardinal, Bernard of Languissel could participated in two conclaves:

- Conclave of 1285, which elected Pope Honorius IV, but was absent
- Conclave of 1287/88, which elected Pope Nicholas IV, was present

== Sources ==
- Albanès, Joseph Hyacinthe - Gallia christiana novissima, page 504-505
- Salvador Miranda, LANGUISSEL, Bernard de, on fiu.edu – The Cardinals of the Holy Roman Church, Florida International University.
- Daniel Waley, BERNARDO di Languissel, in Dizionario biografico degli italiani, vol. 9, Istituto dell'Enciclopedia Italiana, 1967.
- David M. Cheney, Bernardo di Languissel, in Catholic Hierarchy.
