= Claude Plantier =

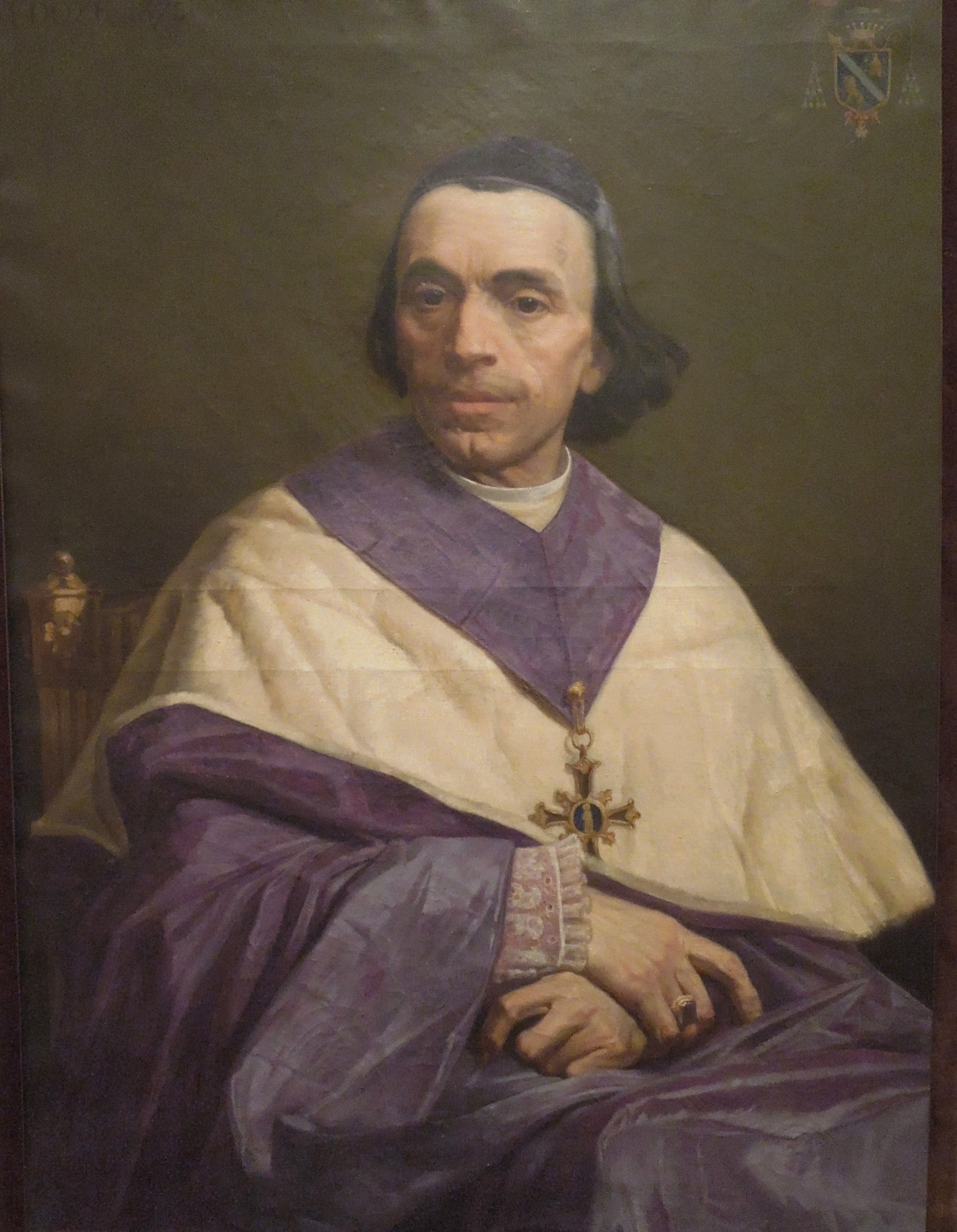
Mgr Claude-Henri PLANTIER by Melchior Doze about 1855

Claude-Henri Plantier (1813–1875) was the Catholic Bishop of Nîmes from 1855. He was strongly Ultramontanist and anti-Protestant

He was an important figure in the debates on papal infallibility, with Louis Pie, Bishop of Poitiers, leading up to and at Vatican I. Some of his comments brought a reaction from Bismarck.

He was also an opponent of bullfighting, publishing a pastoral letter hostile to it in 1863.

== Works ==
- Règles de la vie sacerdotale (1859)
- Pie IX défenseur et vengeur de la vraie civilisation (1866)
- Sur les Conciles généraux (1869)
