= Fraisse-Cabardès =

Commune in Occitanie, France

- Commune
- Coat of arms
- Location of Fraisse-Cabardès
- Location within France Location within Occitanie
- Coordinates: 43°19′33″N 2°16′20″E
- Country: France
- Region: Occitania
- Department: Aude
- Arrondissement: Carcassonne
- Canton: La Malepère à la Montagne Noire

Government
  - Mayor (2020–2026): Guy Jalabert
- Area^{1}: 7.13 km^{2} (2.75 sq mi)
- Elevation: 300 m (980 ft)
- Highest elevation: 470 m (1,540 ft)
- Lowest elevation: 237 m (778 ft)
- Population (2023): 104
  - Density: 14.6/km^{2} (37.8/sq mi)
- Time zone: UTC+01:00 (CET)
  - Summer (DST): UTC+02:00 (CEST)
- INSEE/Postal code: 11156 /11600
- ^{1} French Land Register data, which excludes lakes, ponds, glaciers > 1 km^{2} (0.386 sq mi or 247 acres) and river estuaries.

Fraisse-Cabardès (French pronunciation: [fʁɛs kabaʁdɛs]; Occitan: Fraisse de Cabardés) is a commune in the Aude department in southern France.

== Population ==
Historical population
Year	Pop.	±% p.a.
1968	119	—
1975	68	−7.68%
1982	81	+2.53%
1990	97	+2.28%
1999	109	+1.30%
2007	110	+0.11%
2012	110	+0.00%
2017	104	−1.12%
2023	104	+0.00%
Source: INSEE

== See also ==
- Communes of the Aude department
