= Jean-Pierre Boyer (cardinal) =

French prelate

His Eminence Jean-Pierre Boyer
- Cardinal, Archbishop of Bourges
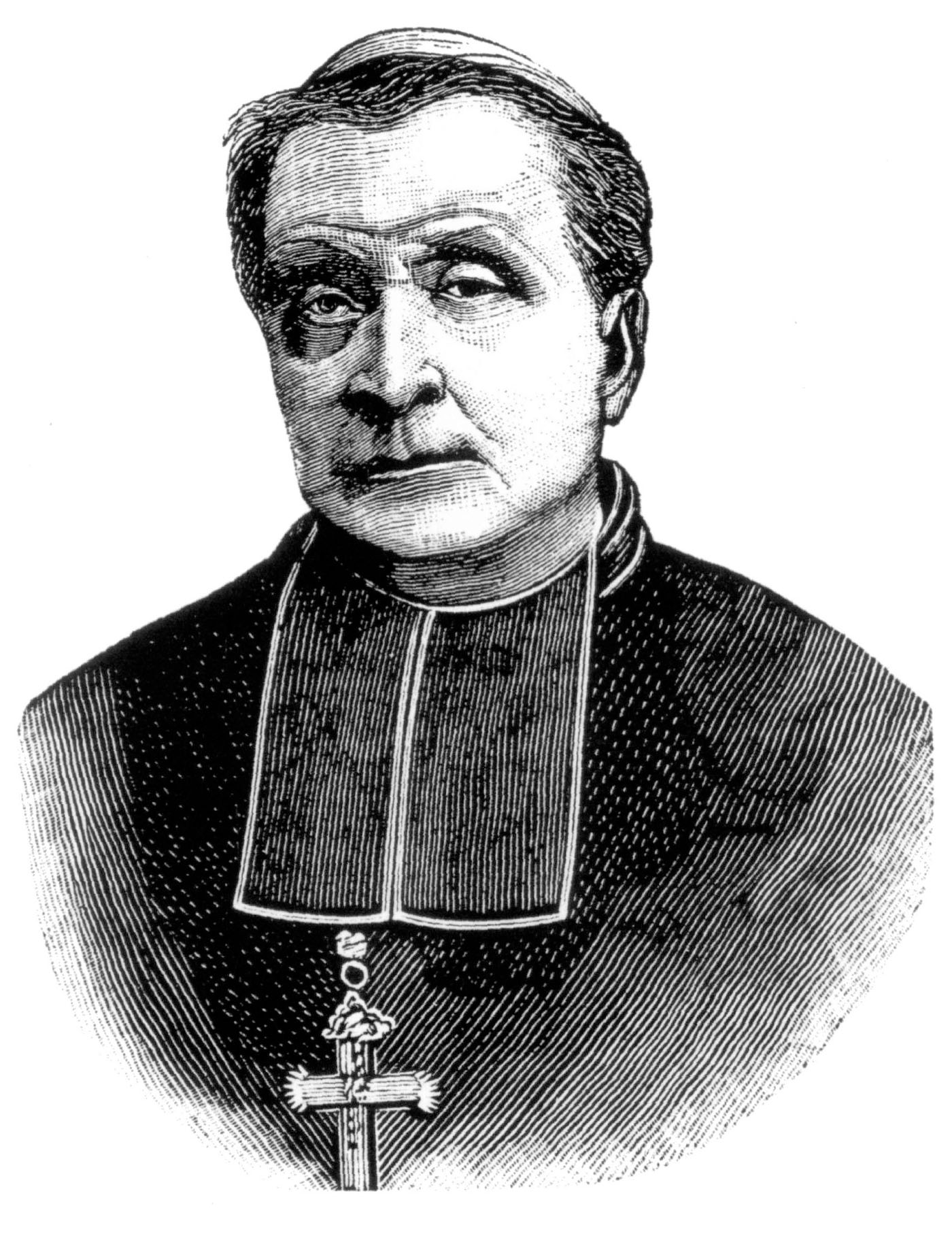
- Church: Catholic Church
- Archdiocese: Bourges
- Appointed: 19 January 1893
- Installed: 14 March 1893
- Term ended: 16 December 1896
- Predecessor: Jean-Joseph Marchal
- Successor: Pierre-Paul Servonnet
- Other post: Cardinal-Priest of Santissima Trinità al Monte Pincio (1896)
- Previous posts: Titular Bishop of Evaria (1878-79); Coadjutor Bishop of Clermont (1878-79); Bishop of Clermont (1879-93)

Orders
- Ordination: 23 December 1854 by Frédéric-Gabriel-Marie-François de Marguerye
- Consecration: 24 August 1878 by Théodore-Augustin Forcade
- Created cardinal: 29 November 1895 by Leo XIII
- Rank: Cardinal-Priest

Personal details
- Born: Jean-Pierre Boyer; 27 July 1829 Paray-le-Monial, Charolles, Saône-et-Loire, Kingdom of France
- Died: 16 December 1896 (aged 67) Bourges, French Third Republic
- Buried: Bourges Cathedral
- Parents: Jean Mathieu Barnabé Boyer; Françoise Toullion
- Motto: Virtute Omnia parent
- Coat of arms

Jean-Pierre Boyer (27 July 1829 – 16 December 1896) was a French prelate of the Catholic Church who was Bishop of Clermont from 1879 to 1893 and Archbishop of Bourges from 1893 until his death. He was made a cardinal in 1895.

== Biography ==
Jean-Pierre Boyer was born on 27 July 1827 in Paray-le-Monial, the son of a carpenter. After studying at the Major Seminary of Autun, he was ordained a priest of the Diocese of Autun on 23 December 1854 by Frédéric-Gabriel-Marie-François de Marguerye. First a vicar in Autun, he followed his parents to Aix-en-Provence and became the private secretary of the archbishop of Aix. He was then professor of dogmatic theology, superior of the major seminary, and rector of the theological faculty of Aix-en-Provence.

Boyer was appointed bishop coadjutor of the Diocese of Clermont on 12 June 1878 and on the following 15 July named titular bishop of Euroea. He received his episcopal consecration in Aix-en-Provence on 24 August 1878 from Théodore-Augustin Forcade, Archbishop of Aix. His coat of arms paid tribute to his family with carpenter's planes, rough beams, and daisies. He succeeded as bishop of Clermont on the death of Louis-Charles Féron on 24 December 1879.

Over his objections, Boyer was appointed by a decree of the President of the Republic on 26 November 1892 to lead the Archdiocese of Bourges. He persisted in his refusal until the Holy See intervened and he accepted the assignment. He was therefore transferred on 19 January 1893 and installed on 14 March.

Pope Leo XIII made him a cardinal on 29 November 1895. He received the regalia of his office in Paris on 11 December from Félix Faure, president of France. Pope Leo granted him the title of cardinal priest of the Santissima Trinità dei Monti on 25 June 1896.

He died in Bourges on 16 December 1896 at the age of 67 and was buried in the cathedral there.
