= Stanislas Touchet =

French prelate (1842–1926)

His Eminence Stanislas Touchet
- Bishop of Orléans
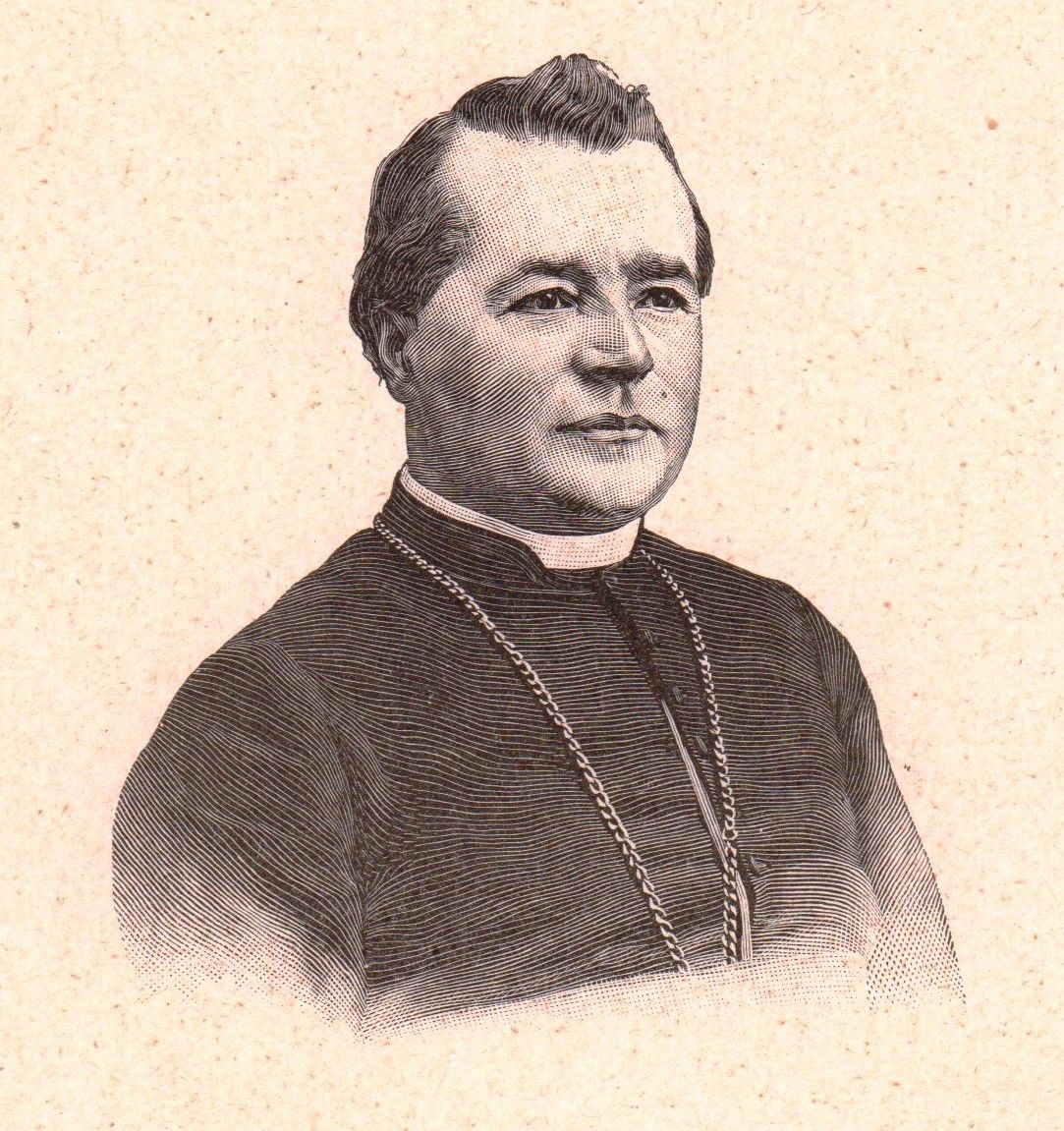
- Picture circa 1901.
- Church: Roman Catholic Church
- Diocese: Orléans
- See: Orléans
- Appointed: 18 May 1894
- Term ended: 23 September 1926
- Predecessor: Pierre-Hector Coullié
- Successor: Jules-Marie-Victor Courcoux
- Other post: Cardinal-Priest of Santa Maria sopra Minerva (1922-26)

Orders
- Ordination: 29 June 1872
- Consecration: 15 July 1894 by Flavien-Abel-Antoinin Hugonin
- Created cardinal: 11 December 1922 by Pope Pius XI
- Rank: Cardinal-Priest

Personal details
- Born: Stanislas-Arthur-Xavier Touchet; 13 November 1842 Soliers, French Kingdom
- Died: 23 September 1926 (aged 83) Orléans, French Third Republic
- Buried: Orléans Cathedral
- Parents: Louis Modeste Touchet; Stéphanie Félicité Ducellier
- Motto: Spes ac robur
- Coat of arms

Styles of Stanislas Touchet
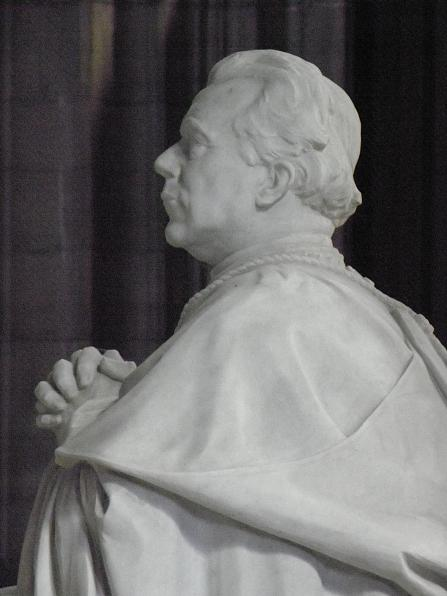
- Reference style: His Eminence
- Spoken style: Your Eminence
- Informal style: Cardinal
- See: none

Stanislas-Arthur-Xavier Touchet (13 November 1842 – 23 September 1926) was a French prelate of the Roman Catholic Church who served as Bishop of Orléans from 1894 until his death, and became a cardinal in 1922.

== Biography ==
Stanislas Touchet was born in Soliers, and studied at the Seminary of Saint-Sulpice in Paris. He was ordained to the priesthood on 13 June 1872, and then did pastoral work in the Archdiocese of Besançon until 1894.

On 18 May 1894, Touchet was appointed Bishop of Orléans by Pope Leo XIII. He received his episcopal consecration on the following 15 July from Bishop Flavien-Abel Hugonin, with Bishops Abel-Anastase Germain and Charles-Bonaventure Theuret serving as co-consecrators, in the Besançon Cathedral.

After becoming an Assistant at the Pontifical Throne on 19 June 1922, Touchet was created Cardinal Priest of Santa Maria sopra Minerva by Pope Pius XI in the consistory of 11 December of that same year. He would serve as Bishop of Orléans for a period of thirty-two years.

He was also a Knight of the Legion of Honour.

He died in Orléans, at the age of 77, and is buried in its Cathedral.

== Selected works ==
- Retraites spirituelles
- La sainte de la patrie
- Vie de sainte Jeanne d'Arc
- Pour les Arméniens
- Panégyrique de Jeanne d'Arc
- Ce que fut Jeanne d'Arc
- Oeuvres choisies
- La mission de la vénérable Jeanne d'Arc
- Aux infirmières de France

Catholic Church titles
Preceded by Pierre-Hector Coullie	Bishop of Orléans; 1894–1926	Succeeded by Jules-Marie Courcoux
