= Bannay, Cher =

Bannay
- Commune
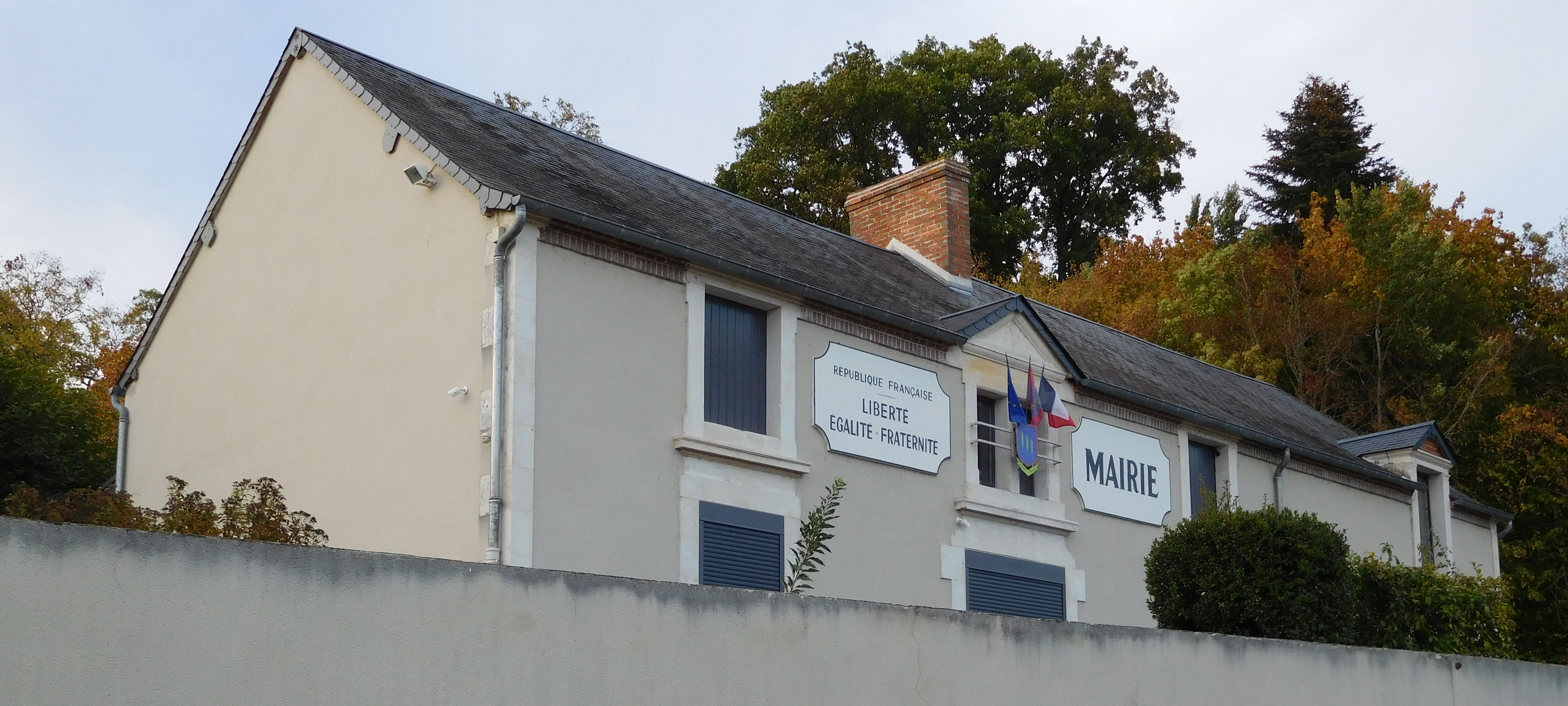
- Town hall

- Coat of arms
- Location of Bannay
- Location within France Location within Centre-Val de Loire
- Coordinates: 47°23′12″N 2°52′52″E
- Country: France
- Region: Centre-Val de Loire
- Department: Cher
- Arrondissement: Bourges
- Canton: Sancerre
- Intercommunality: CC Pays Fort Sancerrois Val de Loire

Government
  - Mayor (2020–2026): Alain André
- Area^{1}: 25.03 km^{2} (9.66 sq mi)
- Elevation: 148 m (486 ft)
- Highest elevation: 260 m (850 ft)
- Lowest elevation: 139 m (456 ft)
- Population (2023): 845
  - Density: 33.8/km^{2} (87.4/sq mi)
- Time zone: UTC+01:00 (CET)
  - Summer (DST): UTC+02:00 (CEST)
- INSEE/Postal code: 18020 /18300
- ^{1} French Land Register data, which excludes lakes, ponds, glaciers > 1 km^{2} (0.386 sq mi or 247 acres) and river estuaries.

Bannay (French pronunciation: [banɛ]) is a commune in the Cher department in the Centre-Val de Loire region of France by the banks of the river Loire, about 30 miles (48 km) northeast of Bourges.

== Population ==
Historical population
Year	Pop.	±% p.a.
1968	673	—
1975	737	+1.31%
1982	785	+0.91%
1990	766	−0.31%
1999	771	+0.07%
2007	762	−0.15%
2012	814	+1.33%
2017	907	+2.19%
2023	845	−1.17%
Source: INSEE

== See also ==
- Communes of the Cher department
