= Diocese of Nîmes =

Catholic diocese in France

Coordinates: 43°50′28″N 4°21′35″E

Diocese of Nîmes (–Uzès and Alès) Dioecesis Nemausensis (–Uticensis et Alesiensis) Diocèse de Nîmes (–Uzès et Alès)

Catholic
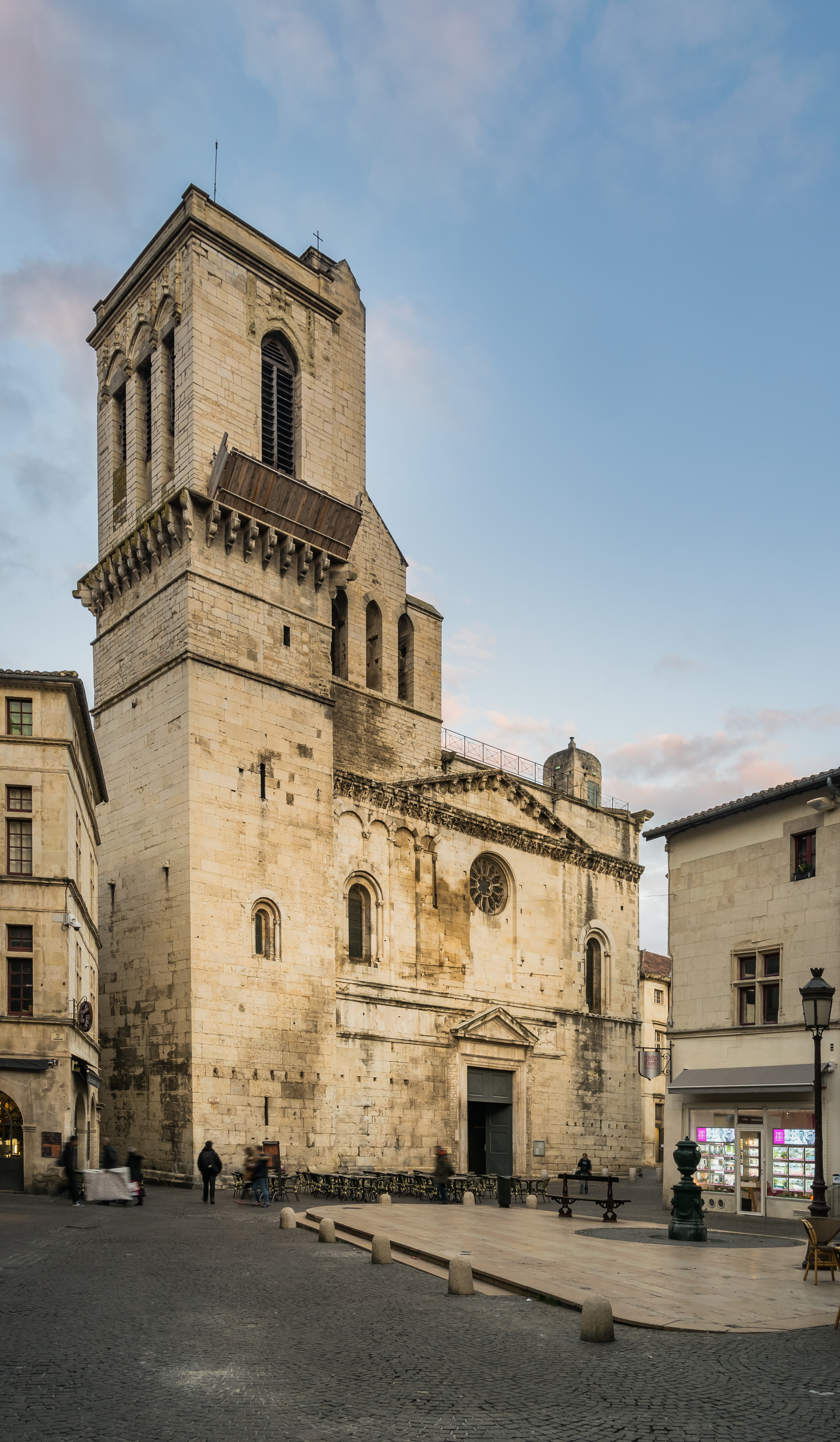
- Nîmes Cathedral

Location
- Country: France
- Territory: Gard
- Ecclesiastical province: Montpellier
- Metropolitan: Montpellier

Statistics
- Area: 5,853 km^{2} (2,260 sq mi)
- Population: Total; Catholics: (as of 2023); 728,600; 423,000 (58.1%)
- Parishes: 403

Information
- Denomination: Catholic Church
- Sui iuris church: Latin Church
- Rite: Roman Rite
- Established: 5th Century; Name Changed: 27 April 1877
- Cathedral: Cathedral Basilica of Our Lady and St. Castor in Nîmes
- Patron saint: Notre Dame
- Secular priests: 84 (diocesan); 11 (religious orders); 23 (permanent deacons)

Current leadership
- Pope: Leo XIV
- Bishop: Nicolas Brouwet
- Metropolitan Archbishop: Norbert Turini
- Bishops emeritus: Robert Wattebled

Map

Website
- www.nimes-catholique.fr

The Diocese of Nîmes (Latin: Dioecesis Nemausensis; French: Diocèse de Nîmes) is a Latin diocese of the Catholic Church in France. The diocese comprises all of the department of Gard.

By the Concordat of 1801 the Diocese of Nîmes was not restored, and the territory of the former Diocese of Gard was assigned to the Diocese of Avignon. Nîmes was re-established as a separate diocese in 1821 and a Brief of 27 April 1877, granted its bishops the right to add Alais (the modern Alès) and Uzès to their episcopal style, these two dioceses being now combined with that of Nîmes. Therefore, the formal name is the Diocese of Nîmes (–Uzès and Alès) (Latin: Dioecesis Nemausensis (–Uticensis et Alesiensis); French: Diocèse de Nîmes (–Uzès et Alès)).

== History ==
Nîmes (Latin: Nemausus) was an important city in Roman antiquity, located on the Via Domitia, the principal land route between the Iberian peninsula and Italy. The Pont du Gard, an aqueduct once the major source of fresh water, is c. 27km or 17 mi east-northeast of Nîmes.

Late and rather contradictory traditions attribute the foundation of the Church of Nîmes either to Celidonius, the man "who was blind from his birth" of the Gospel, or to St. Honestus, the apostle of Navarre, said to have been sent to southern France by St. Peter, with St. Saturninus (Sernin) of Toulouse. A martyr of Nîmes was St. Baudilus, whose martyrdom is variously placed at the end of the 3rd century, or at the end of the 4th.

There was a see at Nîmes at least as early as 396, for in that year a synodical letter was sent by the twenty-one bishops of a council of Nîmes to the bishops of Gaul. Many writers affirm that a certain Felix of Nîmes, killed by the Vandals about 407, was a Bishop of Nîmes, but this is disputed by Louis Duchesne.

The first bishop whose date is positively known is Sedatus, present at the Council of Agde in 506.

In 737, Charles Martel set fire to the city of Nemausus, which at that time was in the hands of the Saracens.

Bishop Gilbert (c. 875–892) attended the council of the province of Narbonne, summoned by Archbishop Theodard, at a place called Portus in the diocese of Nîmes. It was held in 886, 887, or slightly later.

In 924, in the time of Bishop Ugbertus, the Hungarians invaded Languedoc, and invested and pillaged Nîmes. They were eventually driven out by Count Raymond-Pons of Toulouse.

=== Popes and Nîmes ===
Urban II, having come to France to preach the crusade, on 6 July 1096 consecrated the Cathedral of Nîmes, which had been begun by Bishop Pierre Ermangaud (1080–1090) and financed, at least in part, by Count Raymond de Saint-Gilles. On 8 July Pope Urban presided over a council in the cathedral of Notre-Dame.

Pope Alexander III passed through the territory of Nîmes in mid-July 1162, on his way from Montpellier to Mende. Pope Clement IV (1265–1268), born at Saint Gilles in the diocese of Nîmes, with a letter dated 4 February 1266 presented the monastery of Saint-Gilles (Egidius) a silver seal which he had ordered fabricated.

=== Albigensians and Languedoc ===
The Albigensian Crusade brought regular military campaigns to Languedoc. Count Raymond VI of Toulouse and his son Raymond VII were favorable to the heretics, partly out of distaste of the French kings, who had supported Simon de Montfort in his seizure of the county of Toulouse. Bishop Arnaud of Nîmes (1212–1242), urged on by Pope Innocent III, was vigorous in his pursuit of heretics, which brought him into conflict with the counts of Toulouse, who had been excommunicated and driven out of their ancestral lands. When Count Raymond VII undertook an expedition against the castle of Penne in 1223, the bishops of Nîmes, Agde, and Lodève were forced to flee from the ravages of the count's forces, taking refuge with the papal legate, Cardinal Conrad von Urach, bishop of Porto, in Béziers. The quartet of bishops sent a letter of appeal for aid on 1 May 1233 to King Philip II of France, but unfortunately the king died on 14 July. In December 1223, Pope Innocent wrote to the new king, Louis VIII, urging him not only to send money to finance the crusade, but to take part personally. In 1224, Bishop Arnaud was one of the negotiators who persuaded Simon de Montfort's son, Amaury, to relinquish the county of Toulouse. Arnaud was present at Montpellier on 25 August 1224, when Raymond VII swore the oaths which brought about his restoration as count, and promised the restoration of the territory of Millau to the bishop of Nîmes. The leaders and people of Nîmes finally submitted to the king of France and to the Church on 3 June 1226; Bishop Arnaud received their oaths of obedience to the Church.

In 1226, King Louis VIII established the royal seneschal of Beaucaire, and located its headquarters at Nîmes. Bishop Arnaud himself swore his allegiance to the new king, Louis IX, in May 1227.

Louis IX of France, who embarked at Aigues-Mortes for his two crusades, the earlier in 1248, the later in 1270, surrounded Nîmes with walls.

=== Conflict between Philip IV and Pope Boniface VIII ===
Bishop Bertrand de Languissel (1280–1323) held a diocesan synod in Nîmes in 1284, and issued an extensive collection of canons.

In the midst of their struggle for power between church and state, King Philip had had the Bishop of Pamiers, Bernard Saisset arrested, charged with treason, and imprisoned, refusing permission for the bishop to travel to Rome to have his case heard there. On 5 December 1301, Pope Boniface demanded that Bishop Bernard be sent to Rome, lest the king offend the divine majesty and the dignity of the Apostolic See. On the same day, the Pope announced that he was summoning a council of the prelates of France, to meet in Rome on 1 November 1302, to correct and reform the various offenses of King Philip and his officials. Philip responded by summoning a council of his own, of delegates from the cities of Languedoc, to meet in Paris on the Sunday before Palm Sunday, to give their advice on matters to be submitted to them. The prelates who attended asked the king's permission to attend the council in Rome in November, which the king refused.

Immediately upon his return to Languedoc, Archbishop Gilles Aicelin of Narbonne held a provincial council in Nîimes, to debate whether to obey the king or obey the pope. Bishop Bertrand de Languissel of Nîmes chose to attend the papal council in Rome in November, and for that act he had his episcopal temporalities seized by the king, and was expelled from his diocese. He was restored by mid-August 1303, when King Philip IV wrote to him, to have his clerics pay the 10% levy which the king needed for his war in Flanders.

In the second half of February 1304, King Philip IV and Queen Jeanne de Navarre visited Nîmes. In 1305, Pope Clement V (Bertrand de Got) passed through the city on his way to Lyon to be crowned; he was in Nîmes on 21 October 1305. Pope Clement visited Nîmes again at the end of April 1309.

On 13 October 1307, on orders of King Philip IV, all the Knights Templar in the kingdom of France were arrested and imprisoned, including those who had a house at Saint-Gilles in the diocese of Nîmes. Bishop Bernard de Languessel conducted his own interrogation of the accused, in addition to those of royal officers. He submitted his report to the king in April 1308. Another interrogation, by a delegate of the bishop, took place at the royal château d'Alais in June 1310. On 29 August, the commissioner declared the prisoners guilty, and had them put to torture.

=== Hundred Years' War ===
In April 1355, King Edward III of England decided to renew his war against France. At the Battle of Poitiers on 19 September 1356, King John II of France was captured, taken to England, and held for ransom. The seneschal of Beaucaire was expected both to help raise the king's ranson and to defend southern France, which included Nîmes from English invasion from Aquitaine, led by the Black Prince. Nîmes was required to reinforce its defences, raise troops, and send representatives to the Estates General of the province at Toulouse, two of whom went to England as negotiators. In consequence of disputes about the requisition of grapes for wine for the papal household, Pope Innocent VI laid an interdict on Nîmes in September 1358. The dispute was resolved by a delegation of prelates sent from Avignon on 6 September 1359, and the interdict was cancelled.

On 21 May 1474, the Franciscans (Cordeliers) began their General Chapter, at Nîmes. Between 500 and 600 members attended.

In 1498, the Carmelites held their General Chapter in Nîmes. In 1505, the Franciscans held a provincial chapter in Nîmes.

=== Huguenots ===
Huguenot control (purple) and influence (violet), 16th century

In 1539, with the support of King Francis I of France, and later King Henry II of France, a collège was established in Nîmes. Originally intended for Catholics and Protestants, it gradually fell under the influence of the consistory of Nîmes, and by 1562 had established a school of theology, Hebrew, and Greek.

In 1545, some enthusiastic followers of Luther's doctrine against the cult of the saints, attacked an image of the Virgin Mary in one of the chapels of the cathedral. A procession to expiate for the sacrilege was ordered to be held on 28 October, in which the entire population was ordered to take part by the seneschal of Nîmes. In 1551, a number of Protestants were discovered in the sénéchaussée ob Beaucaire, one of whom, Maurice Secenat, had been preaching in Nîmes. They were condemned to be burnt at the stake, and were executed.

In March 1552, the first Calvinist preachers, sent from Geneva, appeared in Nîmes.

The diocese was greatly disturbed by the Wars of Religion. In 1560, the Comte de Villars established the first governor of Nîmes, to control the populace, an institution which continued until 1722, when many of its powers were handed over to royal lieutenants. On 1 June 1561, John Calvin wrote to the Protestants in Nîmes, complaining that they were divided into factions, whereas unity was what was most needed; the dissension was over the question of whether Uzês or Nîmes was to have a pastor named Mutonis. In July 1563, he claimed that the churches of Nîmes were all in the hands of the Protestants.

Bishop Bernard d'Elbène (del Bene) (1561–1568), a native of Florence, had been absent at the Council of Trent in 1562 and 1563. On his return, he and the Huguenots were at odds. On 29 September 1567, five years before the Massacre of St. Bartholomew, the Protestants of Nîmes carried out a massacre of Catholics, known as the Michelade, in which no fewer than 80 Catholics were murdered; and in 1568 they seized and imprisoned Bishop D'Elbène, charging him with sedition. He was saved, however, by the intervention of Catherine de'Medicis, his affinis. In 1566, five of the canons of the cathedral publicly embraced Protestantism and were summoned before the magistrate, who condemned them; they appealed, however, to the royal council, and obtained an arrêt to stop the proceedings.

The eighth national synod of the Huguenots was held in Nîmes, beginning on 6 May 1572, three months before the St. Bartholomew's Day Massacre. The royal order for the massacre of the Huguenots arrived in Nîmes on 29 August 1572, but it was not put into effect.

In 1598, at the time of the Edict of Nantes, the Protestant population of Nîmes was c. 11–12,000, while Catholics numbered c. 3–4,000.

King Louis XIII, on 28 June 1628, at Nîmes issued the decree of religious pacification known as the Peace of Nîmes.

By means of letters patents, granted by Louis XIII in May 1636, with the agreement of Bishop Cohon and under the understanding that they would perpetually be under the authority of the bishop, the Ursulines of Lyon established their first house in Nîmes, the first religious order to be established since the peace with the Huguenots and the return of Catholicism to the city.

On 3 February 1644, King Louis XIV signed letters patents confirming the establishment of the Jesuits at the collège de Nîmes.

=== French Revolution ===
On 2 November 1789, the National Assembly proclaimed that all ecclesiastical property was confiscated by the State.

Even before it directed its attention to the Church directly, the National Constituent Assembly attacked the institution of monasticism. On 13 February 1790. it issued a decree which stated that the government would no longer recognize solemn religious vows taken by either men or women. In consequence, Orders and Congregations which lived under a Rule were suppressed in France. Members of either sex were free to leave their monasteries or convents if they wished, and could claim an appropriate pension by applying to the local municipal authority.

The National Constituent Assembly ordered the replacement of political subdivisions of the ancien régime with subdivisions called "departments", to be characterized by a single administrative city in the center of a compact area. The decree was passed on 22 December 1789, and the boundaries fixed on 26 February 1790, with the effective date of 4 March 1790. A new department was created, called "Gard," with Nîmes as one of three alternate places of assembly, with Nîmes given priority for the seat of the department tribunal.

The National Constituent Assembly then, on 6 February 1790, instructed its ecclesiastical committee to prepare a plan for the reorganization of the clergy. At the end of May, its work was presented as a draft Civil Constitution of the Clergy, which, after vigorous debate, was approved on 12 July 1790. There was to be one diocese in each department, requiring the suppression of approximately fifty dioceses. The former diocese of Nîmes became the diocese of Gard, with its seat fixed at Nîmes. The territories of the former dioceses of Nîmes, Uzès, and Alais were consolidated. In place of the former ecclesiastical provinces, each headed by an archbishop, the National Assembly decreed ten new metropolitanates in France. The diocese of Gard was assigned to the "Metropole des côtes de la Médierranée."

The Civil Constitution of the Clergy also abolished Chapters, canonries, prebends, and other offices both in cathedrals and in collegiate churches. It also abolished chapters in abbeys and priories of either sex, whether regular or secular. Bishop de Balore of Nîmes protested the illegality of these measures in canon law, and wrote a pastoral letter from his residence in Paris on 15 March 1791, declaring the election of a constitutional bishop schismatic and of no legal effect, and specifically stating that the abolition of chapters was of no legal effect.

A decree of 27 November 1790 required an oath to observe the Civil Constitution of the Clergy on the part of all holders of an ecclesiastical benefice. In the diocese of Nîmes, the bishop and 78 of the 122 priests refused to take the oath, thereby opening themselves to prosecution as disturbers of the public peace; loss of office and the rights of a citizen were the penalties. Bishop de Balore was deprived of his episcopal office. An electoral assembly was therefore summoned in February 1791; only 209 of 526 electors appeared, most of them Protestant or Jewish. The Protestant minister, Rabaut Saint Étienne, had the name of the Rector of the University of Paris, a member of the National Assembly, and a sworn Constitutional, placed before the electors. He received 119 votes and was declared elected. He was consecrated in Paris by Constitutional Bishop Jean-Baptiste Gobel on 3 April 1791. In the meantime, Bishop de Balore, who was returning to Nîmes from Paris, was detained at Troyes for six days, from which he fled to Holland, then to Zürich. After the Concordat of 1801, Bishop de Balore retired to Polisy, near Bar-sur-Aube.

=== Restoration ===
The French Directory fell in the coup engineered by Talleyrand and Napoleon on 10 November 1799. The coup resulted in the establishment of the French Consulate, with Napoleon as the First Consul. To advance his aggressive military foreign policy, he decided to make peace with the Catholic Church in France and with the Papacy. In the concordat of 1801 with Pope Pius VII, and in the enabling papal bull, "Qui Christi Domini", the constitutional diocese of Gard and all the other dioceses in France, were suppressed. This removed all the institutional contaminations and novelties introduced by the Constitutional Church, and voided all of the episcopal appointments of both authentic and constitutional bishops. The new ecclesiastical structure of France was then decreed, which included ten metropolitan archbishoprics and fifty bishoprics. Cardinal Giovanni Battista Caprara. the papal legate in France, was given the power and authority to erect the dioceses. One of the ten new metropolitanates was that of Aix, and its suffragan Avignon was assigned the departments of Gard and Vaucluse.

The Concordat of 1801 was registered as a French law on 8 April 1802.

The rearrangement of national borders by the Congress of Vienna, following the defeat of Napoleon, and the changes of regimes, required the negotiating or re-negotiating of concordats. The restoration of the Bourbon kings in France resulted in a treaty between Louis XVIII and Pope Pius VII, the Concordat of 11 June 1817. The diocese of Nîmes was to be reestablished through the bull "Commissa divinitus", as a suffragan of Narbonne, but the French Parliament did not approve the treaty.

In preparing a revised version of "Commissa divinitus", it was realized, at an advanced stage of the drafting, that the restoration of the metropolitanates of Arles, Vienne and Narbonne in the Rhone valley would produce an excessive number of small ecclesiastical provinces, and that some consolidation was in order. The ecclesiastical province and the diocese of Narbonne were not revived, and on 6 October 1822 the revived diocese of Nîmes was reassigned to the ecclesiastical province of Avignon.

It was not until 6 October 1822 that a revised version of the papal bull, "Paternae Charitatis," received the approval of all parties.

==== Reconstruction ====
The new bishop of Nîmes, Claude de Chaffoy, had been nominated by King Louis XVIII on 18 August 1817, but, due to the troubles with the French parlement, he was not preconised (confirmed) by Pope Pius VII until 21 September 1821. He immediately set about restoring ecclesiastical order in the diocese, recruiting a new cathedral Chapter, which he installed on 25 March 1822. On 25 August, he laid the cornerstone for a new major seminary. He introduced the Sisters of St. Thomas of VIllanova to care for the Maison de la Providence, and the Religieux de Marie-Therese de Lyon to administer the house for the "filles repenties" (reformed prostitutes). In 1830, he helped to calm the confrontation between Protestants and Catholics before it led to bloodshed. He held a departmental synod on 21–23 September 1835.

Chaffoy's successor, Bishop Jean-François-Marie Cart (1838–1855) installed the Carmelites, the Sisters of Charity of Besançon, the nursing Sisters of Notre-Dame de Bon-Secours, the Sisters of Saint Joseph of Vans, the Récollets, and the Marists. In 1839, he patronized the establishment of a collège, the Maison de l'Assomption, and in 1850 opened the Collège Saint-Stanislas.

Archbishop Jean-Marie-Mathias Debelay of Avignon (1848–1863) held a provincial council of the ecclesiastical province of Avignon in December 1849. The Bourbon monarchy had fallen in the previous year, and in November 1848, Pope Pius IX had fled from Rome, where a republic was declared on 5 February 1849. Bishop Jean-François-Marie Cart (1838–1855) participated in the council. Special effort were made to demonstrate loyalty and obedience to the pope, and to incorporate explicitly decrees of the Council of Trent in the statutes issued by the council of Avignon. Bishop Cart held a diocesan synod on 27–29 September 1851, in which he promulgated the decrees of the provincial council.

Bishop Claude-Henri Plantier (1855–1875), the distinguished polemist, was an anti-imperialist in politics and an ultramontanist. He held a diocesan synod on 26–28 September 1863. His 1873 pastoral letter provoked a protest from the German Chancellor Bismarck.

The cathedral of the Assumption and Saint Castor was restored through the efforts of Bishop Louis Besson (1875–1888) between 1878 and 1882, and reconsecrated by Cardinal Louis-Marie-Joseph-Eusèbe Caverot of Lyon in 1882. Besson held a diocesan synod in 1878.

The French Associations Law of 1901 required that all associations both civil and religious formally register with the government, and disclose their membership, leadership, and affiliation. Their records were to be subject to audit by the government at any time. Those whose leadership lay outside France were required to disassociate from foreign organizations and incorporate as French associations, or cease operations and emigrate. Those congregations in Nîmes that preferred to dissolve or emigrate included: the Assumptionists, the Carthusians of Valbonne, the Jesuits, the Carmelites, the Oblates of the Assumption, the Soeurs du Sacré-Coeur of Villeneuve-les-Avignon, and the Soeurs de Saint-Maurice de Nîmes.

== Bishops ==
=== To 1000 ===
- [ 1st century Celidonius (legendary) ]
- [ 374–407 Felix of Nîmes ]
- 506–510 : Sedatus.
- c. 520 : Johannes
- 589 : Pelagius
- 633–640 : Remessarius
- c. 650 : Johannes (II.)
- 672–675 : Aréjius
- 680 Crocus
- 737 : Palladius
- c. 745 : Gregorius
- 785–788 : Sesnandus
- 791–798 : Vintering
- 808–850 : Christianus
- c. 858 : Isnardus
- c. 875–892 : Gilbert
- 895–906 : Anglard
- 906–928 : Hubert (Ugbertus)
- 929–941 : Rainard
- 943 : Bernard (I.)
- 943–946 : Bégon
- 947–986 : Bernard d'Anduze
- 987–1016 : Frotaire I.

=== 1000 to 1300 ===
- 1016–1026 : Geraldus d'Anduze
- 1027–1077 : Frotaire.
- 1066–1084 : Eléfant (coadjutor)
- 1080–1090 : Pierre Ermangaud
- 1095–1097 : Bertrand de Montredon
- 1097–1112 : Raymond Guillaume
- 1113–1134 : Jean (III.)
- 1134–1141 : Guillaume (I.)
- 1141–1180 : Aldebert d'Uzès et de Posquières
- 1181–1207 : Guillaume (II.) d'Uzès
- 1207–1209 : Hugues de Lédignan
- 1210 : Rodolfe
- 1212–1242 : Arnaud
- 1242–1272 : Raymond Amauri
- 1272–1280 : Pierre Gaucelme
- 1280–1323 : Bertrand de Languissel

=== 1300 to 1500 ===
- 1324 : Armand de Vernon
- 1324 : Bernard III.
- 1324–1331 : Bernard IV.
- 1331–1337 : Guirald de Languissel
- 1337 : Guillaume Curti
- 1337–1342 : Aimeric Girard
- 1342–1348 : Bertrand de Deaux
- 1348–1361 : Jean de Blauzac
- 1361–1362 : Paul de Deaux
- 1362 : Jacques I. de Deaux
- 1362–1367 : Gaucelme de Deaux
- 1367–1372 : Jean V. de Gase
- 1372–1380 : Jean IV. d'Uzès
- 1380–1383 : Seguin d'Authon, Administrator (Avignon Obedience)
- 1383–1391 : Bernard de Bonneval (Avignon Obedience)
- 1391–1393 : Pierre III. Girard, Administrator (Avignon Obedience)
- 1393–1426 : Gilles de Lascours (Avignon Obedience)
- 1420–1429 : Nicolas Habert
- 1429–1438 : Léonard Delphini
- 1438–1441 : Guillaume de Champeaux, Administrator
- 1441–1449 : Guillaume d'Estouteville, Aadministrator
- 1450–1453 : Geoffroy Soreau
- 1453–1458 : Alain de Coëtivy
- 1460–1481 : Robert de Villequier
- 1481–1482 : Etienne de Blosset
- 1482–1496 : Jacques II. de Caulers
- 1496–1514 : Guillaume Briçonnet, in commendam

=== 1500-1800 ===
- 1515–1554 : Michel Briçonnet
- 1554–1561 : Claude Briçonnet
- 1561–1568 : Bernard d'Elbène
- 1573–1594 : Raymond Cavalésy
- 1598–1625 : Pierre de Valernod
- 1625–1633 : Claude de Saint-Bonnet de Thoiras
- 1633–1644 : Anthime Denis Cohon
- 1644–1655 : Hector d'Ouvrier
- 1655–1670 : Anthime Denis Cohon (second time)
- 1671–1689 : Jean-Jacques Séguier de la Verrière
- 1692–1710 : Esprit Fléchier
- 1710–1736 : Jean César Rousseau de la Parisière
- 1737–1784 : Charles Prudent de Becdelièvre
- 1784–1801 : Pierre Marie-Magdeleine Cortois de Balore

Constitutional church (schismatic)

- (1791–1793) : Jean-Baptiste Dumouchel
- (1795–1796) : Pierre Fabrègue

=== From 1800 ===
- 1821–1837 : Claude de Chaffoy
- 1838–1855 : Jean-François-Marie Cart
- 1855–1875 : Claude-Henri Plantier
- 1875–1888 : Louis Besson
- 1889–1896 : Alfred Gilly
- 1896–1921 : Félix Béguinot
- 1921–1924 : Marcellin Charles Marty
- 1924–1963 : Jean Girbeau
- 1963–1977 : Pierre-Marie Rougé
- 1978–1999 : Jean Cadilhac
- 2001–2021 : Robert Wattebled
- 2021–present : Nicolas Brouwet

== See also ==
- Catholic Church in France

== Bibliography ==
=== Reference works ===
- Gams, Pius Bonifatius (1873). Series episcoporum Ecclesiae catholicae: quotquot innotuerunt a beato Petro apostolo. Ratisbon: Typis et Sumptibus Georgii Josephi Manz. pp. 573–575. (Use with caution; obsolete)
- Eubel, Conradus, ed. (1913). Hierarchia catholica, Tomus 1 (second ed.). Münster: Libreria Regensbergiana. (in Latin) pp. 329–330.
- Eubel, Conradus, ed. (1914). Hierarchia catholica, Tomus 2 (second ed.). Münster: Libreria Regensbergiana. (in Latin) p. 187.
- Eubel, Conradus; Gulik, Guilelmus (1923). Hierarchia catholica, Tomus 3 (second ed.). Münster: Libreria Regensbergiana. p. 237-238.
- Gauchat, Patritius (Patrice) (1935). Hierarchia catholica IV (1592-1667). Münster: Libraria Regensbergiana. pp. 234.
- Ritzler, Remigius; Sefrin, Pirminus (1952). Hierarchia catholica medii et recentis aevi V (1667-1730). Patavii: Messagero di S. Antonio. pp. 260.
- Ritzler, Remigius; Sefrin, Pirminus (1958). Hierarchia catholica medii et recentis aevi VI (1730-1799). Patavii: Messagero di S. Antonio. p. 280.
- Ritzler, Remigius; Sefrin, Pirminus (1968). Hierarchia Catholica medii et recentioris aevi (in Latin). Vol. VII (1800–1846). Monasterii: Libr. Regensburgiana.
- Remigius Ritzler; Pirminus Sefrin (1978). Hierarchia catholica Medii et recentioris aevi (in Latin). Vol. VIII (1846–1903. Il Messaggero di S. Antonio.
- Pięta, Zenon (2002). Hierarchia catholica medii et recentioris aevi (in Latin). Vol. IX (1903–1922). Padua: Messagero di San Antonio. ISBN 978-88-250-1000-8.
- Sainte-Marthe, Denis de; Hauréau, Barthélemy (1739). Gallia Christiana: In Provincias Ecclesiasticas Distributa, De provincia Narbonensi (in Latin). Vol. sextus (VI). Paris: Typographia Regia. pp. 426–516, Instrumenta, 165–226.

=== Studies ===
- De Vic, Cl.; Vaissete, J. (1876). Histoire generale de Languedoc (in French). Vol. Tome IV. Toulouse: Edouard Privat.
- Duchesne, Louis (1907). Fastes épiscopaux de l'ancienne Gaule: I. Provinces du Sud-Est (in French) (2nd ed.). Paris: Fontemoing. pp. 310–313.. Archived.
- Germain, Alexandre Charles (1838). Histoire de l ́Eglise de Nimes. (in French) Paris-Nîmes: Giraud, 1838. Volume 1. Volume 2.
- Goiffon, Étienne (1873). Les Évêques de Nîmes au XVIIIe siècle ... 1687-1750 ... par Ménard. Continuation 1750-1820 ... par l'Abbé Goiffon. (Extrait de la Gazette de Nîmes.). Nîmes: L. Bedot 1873.
- Goiffon, Étienne (1877). "Catalogue analytique des évêques de Nîmes," (in French), in: Bulletin du Comité de l'art chrétien de Nîmes (Nîmes: P. Jouve 1877), pp. 304-373.
- Gutherz, Xavier & Raymond Huard (1982). Histoire de Nîmes. (in French). Aix-en-Provence: Edisud, 1982.
- Jean, Armand (1891). Les évêques et les archevêques de France depuis 1682 jusqu'à 1801 (in French). Paris: A. Picard. pp. 270–272.
- Ménard, Leon (1873). Histoire civile, ecclésiastique et littéraire de la ville de Nîmes. (in French). Nîmes: Clavel-Ballivet. Volume 1 1873. Volume 2 1755. Volume 3 1874. Volume 4 1874. Volume 5 1873. Volume 6.
- Pisani, Paul (1907). Répertoire biographique de l'épiscopat constitutionnel (1791-1802) (in French). Paris: A. Picard et fils. pp. 335–337.
- Rouvière, François (1887). Histoire de la Révolution Française dans le Département du Gard. (in French). Nimes: A. Catélan. Volume 1. Volume 2 (1888). Volume 3. Volume 4 (1889).
- Sauzet, Robert (1979). Contre-Réforme et Réforme Catholique en Bas-Languedoc: le dioceèse de Nîmes au XVIIe siècle. (in French). Bruxelles-Louvain-Paris 1979. (Publications de la Sorbonne : N.S. Recherches)
- Sauzet, Robert (1982). "Huguenots et papists à Nîmes, du XVIe siècle au XVIIIe siècle," (in French) in: Xavier Gutherz (et al., edd.), Histoire de Nîmes (Aix 1982).
- Durand, Albert - Société bibliographique (France) (1907). L'épiscopat français depuis le Concordat jusqu'à la Séparation (1802-1905). Paris: Librairie des Saints-Pères. pp. 415–423.

=== For further reading ===
- Lipscomb, Suzannah (2019). The Voices of Nîmes: Women, Sex, and Marriage in Reformation Languedoc. Oxford: OUP, 2019.
- Tulchin, Allan (2010). That Men Would Praise the Lord: The Triumph of Protestantism in Nimes, 1530-1570. Oxford: Oxford University Press, 2010.
