= Nîmes Cathedral =

Church in France

Coordinates: 43°50′18″N 4°21′38″E

Nîmes Cathedral Cathédrale Notre-Dame-et-Saint-Castor de Nîmes
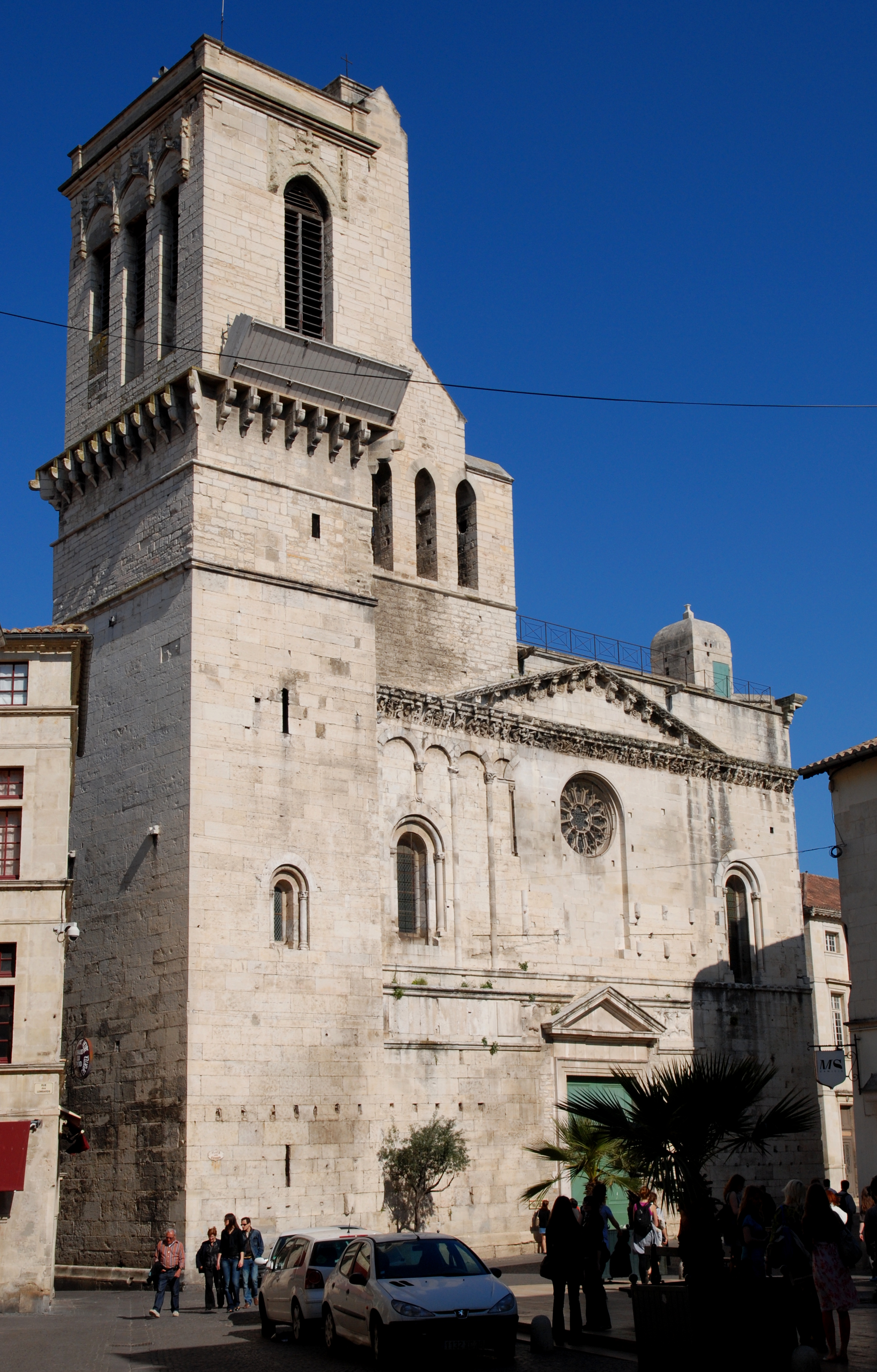
- Nîmes Cathedral

Religion
- Affiliation: Roman Catholic Church
- Province: ecclesiastical province of Avignon
- Region: Gard
- Rite: Roman
- Ecclesiastical or organisational status: Cathedral
- Status: Active

Location
- Location: Nîmes, France
- Interactive map of Nîmes Cathedral; Cathédrale Notre-Dame-et-Saint-Castor de Nîmes

Architecture
- Type: church
- Style: Romanesque, Gothic

Nîmes Cathedral (French: Cathédrale Notre-Dame-et-Saint-Castor de Nîmes) is a Roman Catholic church in Nîmes, France. The cathedral is dedicated to the Blessed Virgin Mary and to the local Saint Castor of Apt.

The cathedral is the seat of the Bishops of Nîmes. In 1877, the name of the diocese was changed, and is now diocese of Nîmes (–Uzès and Alès).

The cathedral is believed to stand on the site of the former temple of Augustus. It is partly Romanesque and partly Gothic in style.

The cathedral was classified as a historical monument in 1906.

== Sources ==
- Catholic Hierarchy: Diocese of Nîmes
