= Dal Pozzo Castle =

Castle in Italy

- Oleggio Castello
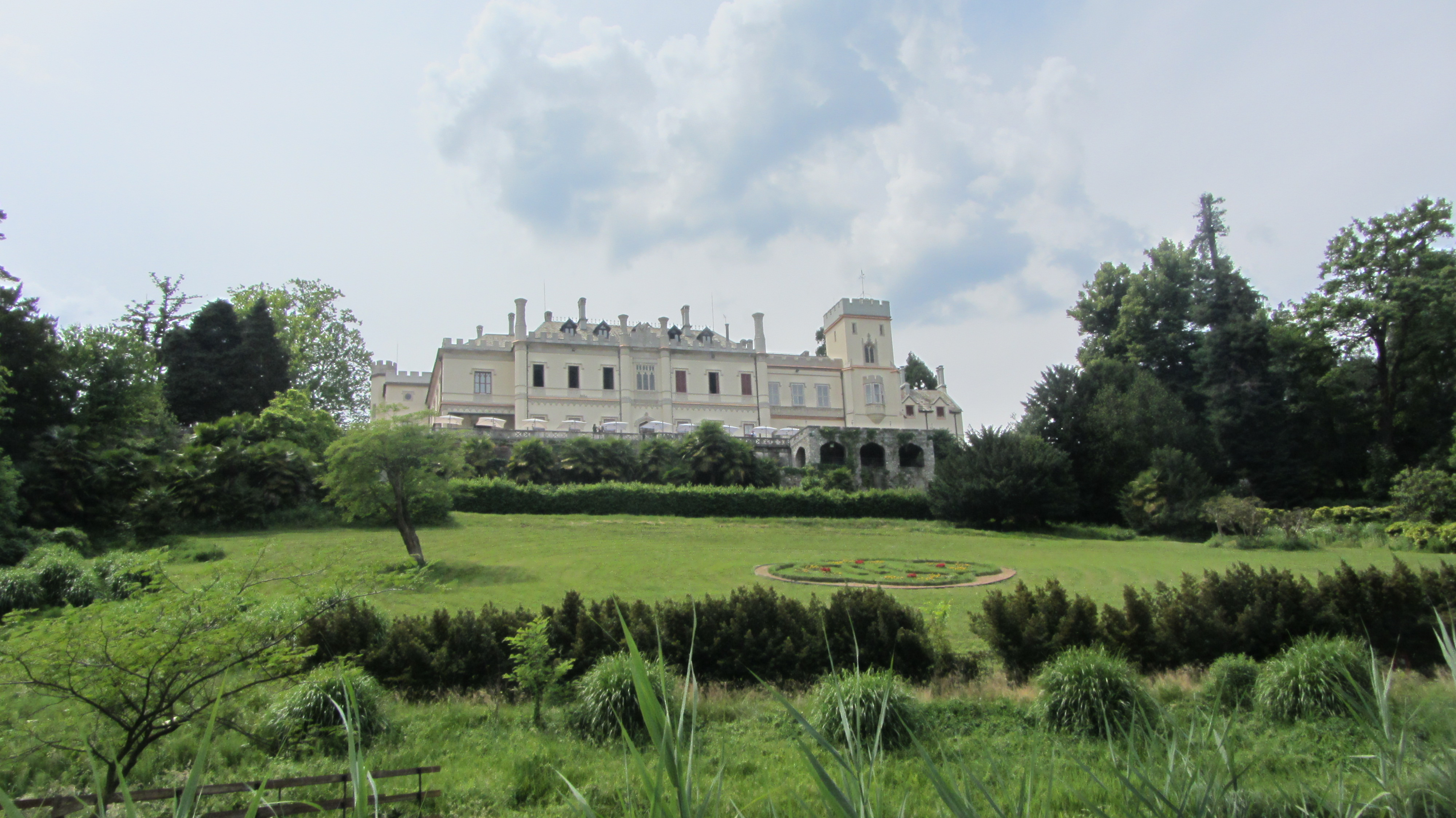
- The castle seen from the park

Site information
- Type: Medieval castle, Revival castle

Location
- Coordinates: 45°45′02″N 8°31′55″E

Site history
- Built: 13th, 19th century
- Built by: Unknown, renovated by Claudio Dal Pozzo

The Dal Pozzo Castle is a castle of medieval origin located in Oleggio Castello, Province of Novara, Piedmont, northern Italy. In the 19th century, it underwent profound transformations providing it the current neo-Gothic Tudor aspect. Today it is the seat of a hotel.

== History ==
Of uncertain origin, the castle is first mentioned at the beginning of the 13th century. Since then it had been inhabited by a branch of the Visconti of Milan, originated by the family of Guido Visconti after his acquisition of the nearby Massino in 1134. The interest of the Visconti for Oleggio Castello was probably motivated also by its proximity to Arona, a town on the shore of the Lake Maggiore with another fortress attested under the guard of a Visconti in 1173.

The Visconti living in Oleggio Castello assumed the surname of Visconti di Oleggio. Giovanni Visconti di Oleggio († 1366), lord of Bologna and Fermo, was one of them.

Passed to the Visconti d'Aragona, another collateral branch of the Visconti of Milan, and subsequently to the Dal Pozzo family, the castle underwent transformation in the 19th century under guidance of Marquess Claudio Dal Pozzo. Inspired by a reinterpretation of the 16th-century Gothic Tudor, he created a vast villa with a consistent style both outside and inside. Around the main building a chapel, the tower at the east and an octagonal small tower on the south-western corner were erected.

== Today ==
The castle today houses the Dal Pozzo Hotel. It is surrounded by a park and on the border of a meadow sloping down toward the Lake Maggiore, leaving the view open to it. The hotel extends itself to other nearby renovated buildings.
