= Visconti Castle (Fagnano Olona) =

Castle in Fagnano Olona

- Castello Visconteo di Fagnano
- Fagnano Olona
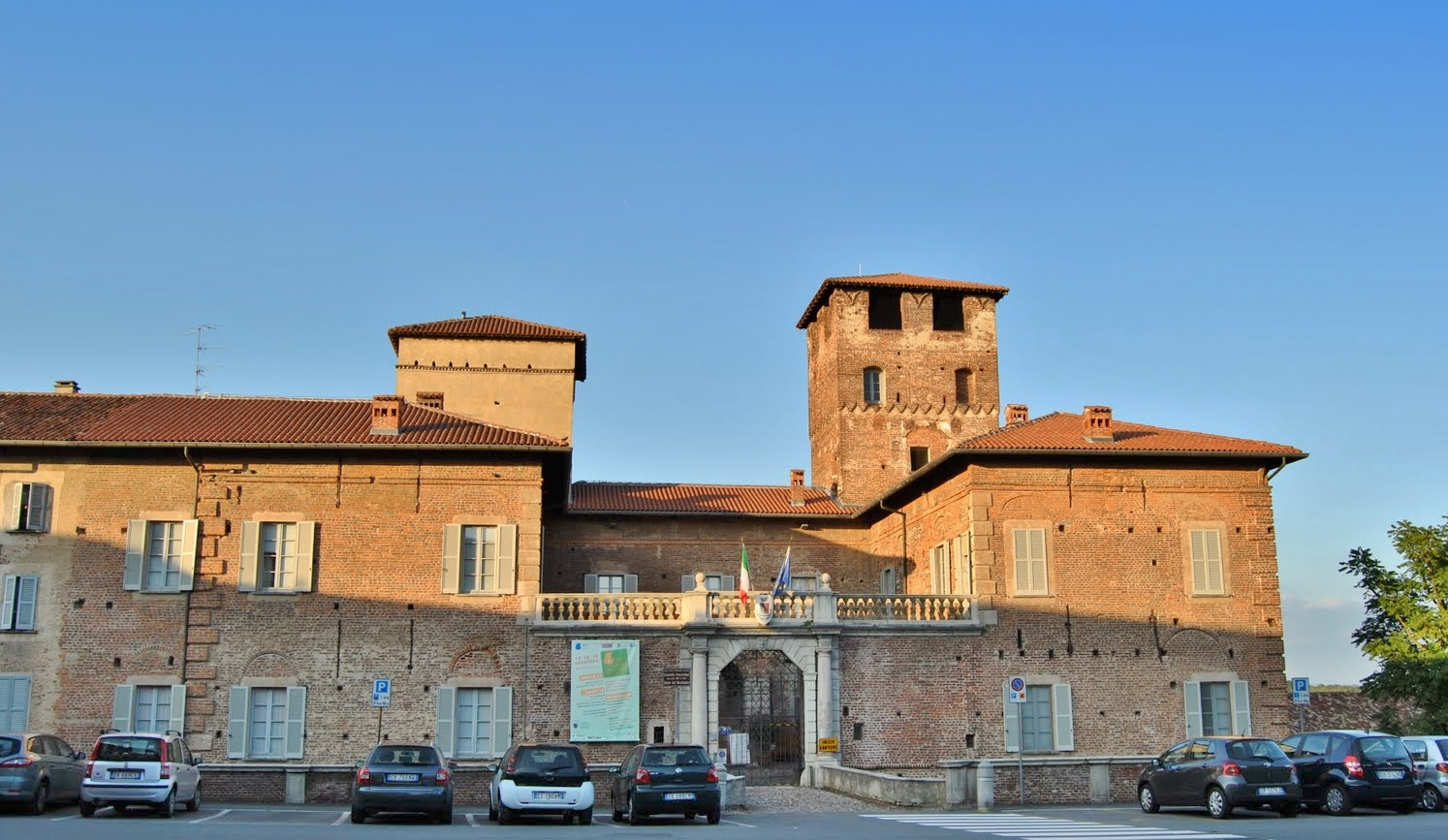
- Façade

Site information
- Type: Medieval castle, noble residence
- Owner: Fagnano Olona municipality
- Condition: Good

Location
- Coordinates: 45°40′10″N 8°52′27″E

Site history
- Built: 13th–16th centuries
- Built by: Visconti house
- Materials: Brick

The Visconti Castle of Fagnano is a castle located in Fagnano Olona, Lombardy, northern Italy. It lies at the border between the town of Fagnano and the Olona valley.

== History ==
The castle already existed in the 13th century. Since the 14th century, it had been a property of a collateral branch of the Visconti house, one of their many estates disseminated in the region surrounding Fagnano (Seprio).

In the 15th century the castle belonged to Gaspare Visconti, counselor of the Duke of Milan Filippo Maria Visconti. From him, it passed to his son named Filippo Maria after the Duke. Although Filippo Maria's main interest was addressed to another castle of the family (at Fontaneto d'Agogna near Novara), he also intervened in Fagnano. It is probably due to him the erection of the two towers of the castle that are visible today.

In the second half of the 16th century, Gaspare Visconti, archbishop of Milan and owner of the castle, further transformed it. A new wing facing the town of Fagnano was added, accentuating the residential character of the complex. The original courtyard was thus preceded by a second one accessible through the new entrance of the castle. A moat was dug to separate the castle from the first houses of Fagnano (today Piazza Cavour) and a bridge was built over it to reach the main door of the castle.

== Today ==
The castle is today in good condition and hosts the municipality of Fagnano Olona.

The internal decorations have almost disappeared. In the older courtyard, a Visconti coat of arms with the letters F and M, the initials of Filippo Maria, can be seen. A relief depicting Our Lady of the Milk adorns the facade.

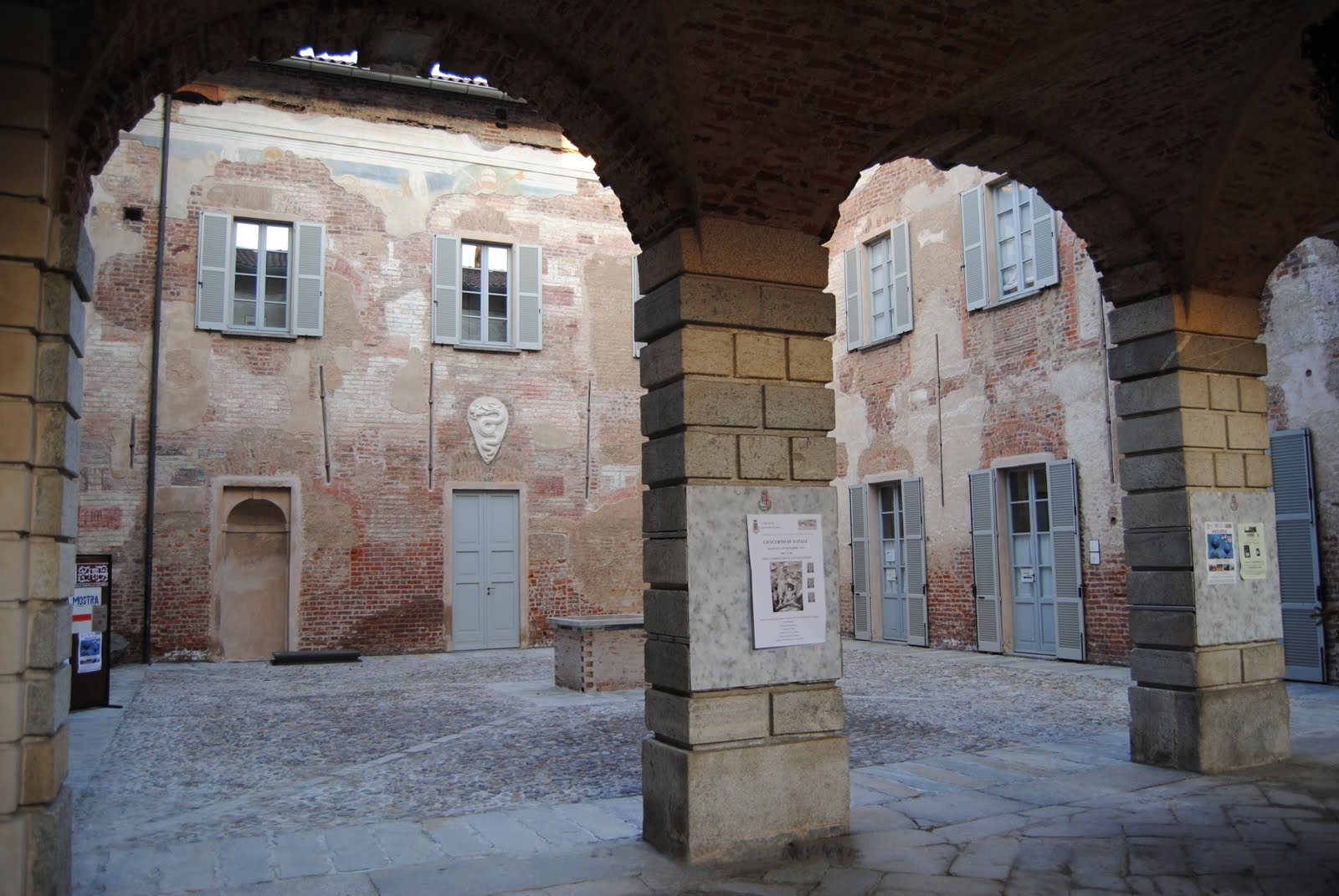
The older courtyard

== Sources ==
- Conti, Flavio; Hybsch, Vincenzo; Vincenti, Antonello (1991). I castelli della Lombardia. Provincie di Como, Sondrio e Varese (in Italian). Novara: Istituto Geografico de Agostini. ISBN 88-402-9108-3.
- Del Tredici, Federico; Rossetti, Edoardo (2012). Percorsi castellani: da Milano a Bellinzona: guida ai castelli del ducato (in Italian). Castelli del ducato. ISBN 9788896451021.
