= Visconti Castle (Massino) =

- Massino Visconti
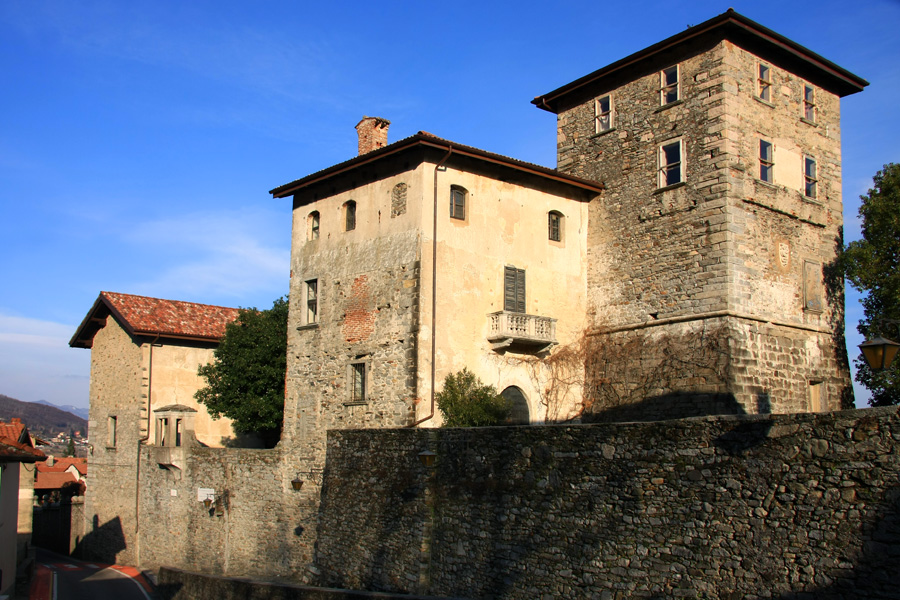
- The castle with the main tower seen from the west

Site information
- Type: Medieval castle

Location
- Coordinates: 45°49′13″N 8°32′18″E

Site history
- Built: 12th century
- Built by: Guido Visconti

The Visconti Castle of Massino is a medieval castle located on the Vergante hills in the municipality of Massino Visconti, Province of Novara, Piedmont, northern Italy. Since the 12th century it has been a possession and one of the preferred residences of the Visconti of Milan. At that time it was frequented by the family ancestor of the lords and dukes of Milan. Afterwards its property was transferred to other collateral branches of the lineage, from the initial Visconti di Massino to the current Visconti di San Vito.

The vast view that can be seen from the site of the castle, covering the Lake Maggiore and the territory beyond it, is supposed to be the motivation of the initial interest of the Visconti of Milan, leading them to the acquisition of the Massino court from the Abbey of Saint Gall in 1134.

== Location ==
The Vergante is a semi-mountainous region few kilometres west of the Lake Maggiore. From Massino, 465 m (1,526 ft) above sea level, the view is open over to the lake and to the region beyond it, comprising the Lake of Varese and the smaller Lake of Monate. The territory seen from Massino has always been part of the archdioceses of Milan and includes other sites with Middle Age fortifications: Angera, Arona, Besozzo, Orino and Velate near Varese. Although excluded from it, the site of the castle appears to be a point from where part of the Milanese territory can be controlled.

== History ==
A first mention of a fortification goes back to the 9th century, when Massino became prerogative of Engelberga, wife of the Emperor Louis II of Italy. The settlement was then donated to the monastery of San Sisto in Piacenza, then transferred to the Abbey of Saint Gall. In 1134 Guido Visconti son of Ottone was invested by the Sangalese monks of their properties and rights in Massino. Eight years later the investiture was confirmed by King Conrad III. Since then it has always been a possession of Visconti families.

In 1823 the property of the castle was transferred from the Visconti di Massino (a Visconti cadet branch originated from Ottone, the eldest son of Guido) to the Visconti d'Aragona. In 1863 it was acquired from the Visconti of Aragona by Pietro Pallestrini, from Villa Biscossi, scholar, author of an industrial review of the Verbano and mayor of Massino, who lived in, restored it and then transmitted it to the Visconti di San Vito another Visconti collateral lineage. Part of the furniture and the archive of the Visconti d'Aragona were moved to the Visconti Castle of Somma Lombardo, another estate house of the Visconti di San Vito.

== Today ==
At the beginning of the 20th century the importance of the Visconti Castle in the local history has led the municipality of Massino to rename itself Massino Visconti. The town can be reached by the Genova Voltri-Gravellona Toce highway, Meina exit. After the first houses the castle appears in its imposing dimensions near the church of Santa Maria. Three towers remain of the castle: two of them on both sides of the southern gate, perhaps the original entrance, surmounted by the usual Biscione. At the center of the castle stands the main tower. The courtyard of the castle ends with a terrace towards the village and the Lake Maggiore. On this side stands out a loggia open for public announcements to the village.

== Sources ==
- Boniforti, Luigi (1871). Il Lago Maggiore e suoi dintorni. Corografia e guida storica, artistica e industriale (in Italian). Milan.
- Brunati, Maria Cristina; Carrisi, Nadia; Panzeri, Enrica; Sassi, Giorgio (2016). "Archivi gentilizi del Castello Visconteo di Somma Lombardo". Annuario dell'Archivio di Stato di Milano 2016 (in Italian). Milan: Scalpendi editore. pp. 139–140. ISBN 9788899473013. Archived from the original on 2018-09-24.
- Del Tredici, Federico; Rossetti, Edoardo (2012). Percorsi castellani: da Milano a Bellinzona: guida ai castelli del ducato (in Italian). Castelli del ducato. ISBN 9788896451021.
- Filippini, Ambrogio (2014). I Visconti di Milano nei secoli XI e XII. Indagini tra le fonti [The Visconti of Milan in the 11th and 12th centuries. Researching the sources] (in Italian). Trento: Tangram Edizioni Scientifiche. ISBN 9788864580968.
