= Abbiategrasso =

Town in Lombardy, Italy

Abbiategrasso Biegrass (Lombard)
- Comune
- Comune di Abbiategrasso
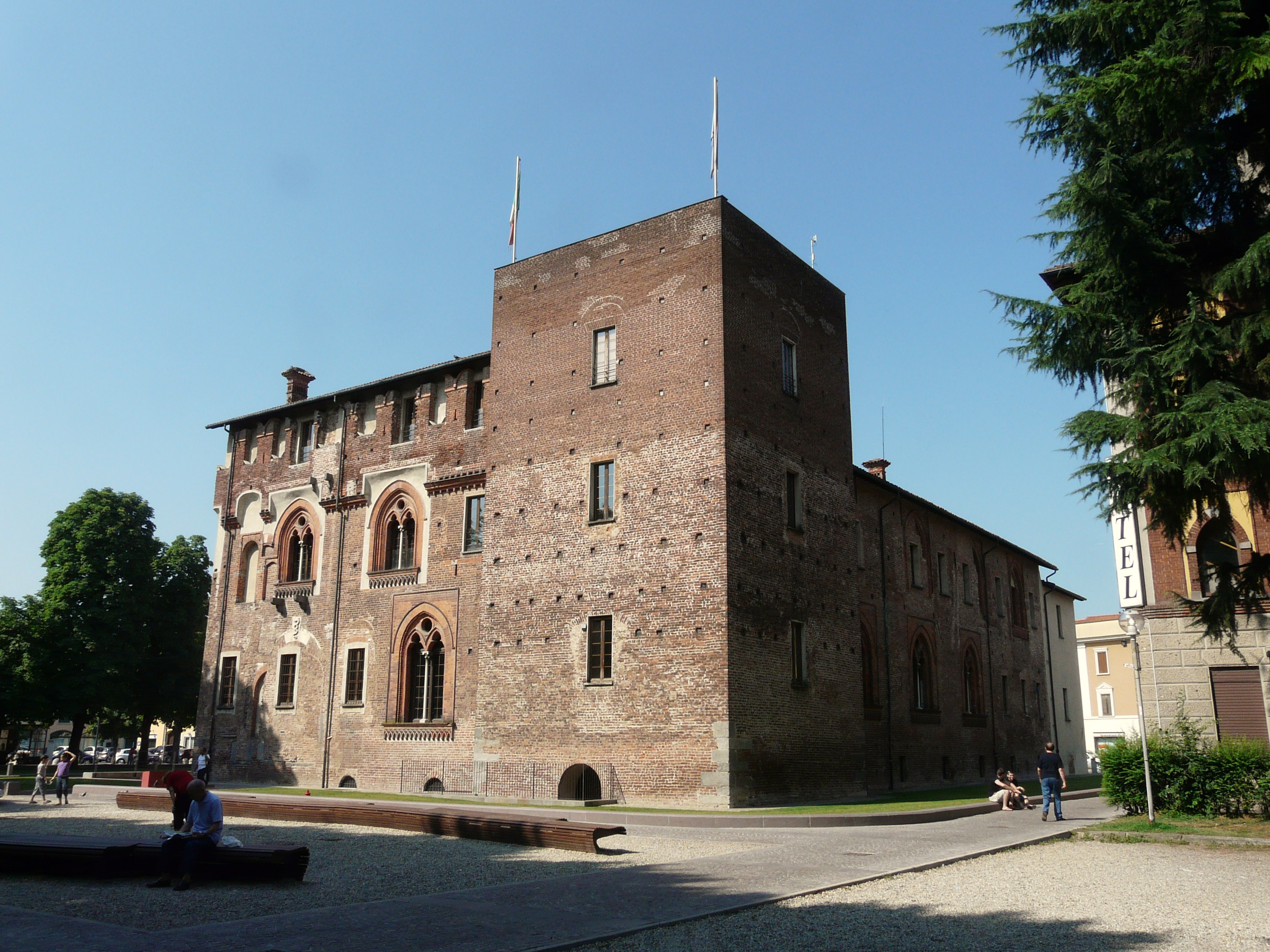
- Visconti Castle.

- Coat of arms

- Abbiategrasso within the Province of Milan

- Location of Abbiategrasso in Italy Abbiategrasso (Lombardy)
- Coordinates: 45°24′N 08°55′E
- Country: Italy
- Region: Lombardy
- Metropolitan city: Milan (MI)

Government
  - Mayor: Francesco Cesare Nai

Area
  - Total: 47.78 km^{2} (18.45 sq mi)
- Elevation: 120 m (390 ft)

Population (30 November 2017)
  - Total: 32,784
  - Density: 686.1/km^{2} (1,777/sq mi)
- Demonym: Abbiatensi
- Time zone: UTC+1 (CET)
  - Summer (DST): UTC+2 (CEST)
- Postal code: 20081
- Dialing code: 02
- Patron saint: Saint Rose of Lima
- Saint day: 23 August
- Website: Official website

Abbiategrasso, formerly written Abbiate Grasso (local Lombard: Biegrass [bjeˈɡras]; Milanese: Biaa [ˈbjaː]), is a comune and town in the Metropolitan City of Milan, Lombardy, northern Italy, situated in the Po valley approximately 22 kilometres (14 miles) from Milan and 38 kilometres (24 miles) from Pavia.

== Twin towns ==
Abbiategrasso is twinned with the following towns:

- Ellwangen, Germany
- Langres, France

== People ==
- Christian Abbiati, footballer
- Gianni Giudici, racing driver
- Franco Moschino, fashion designer
- Giuseppina Tuissi, partisan during World War II
- Marco Villa, road and track cyclist

== See also ==
- Visconti Castle (Abbiategrasso)
- Mivar
