= Visconti Castle (Abbiategrasso) =

Castle in northern Italy

- Castello Visconteo di Abbiategrasso
- Abbiategrasso, Lombardy, Northern Italy
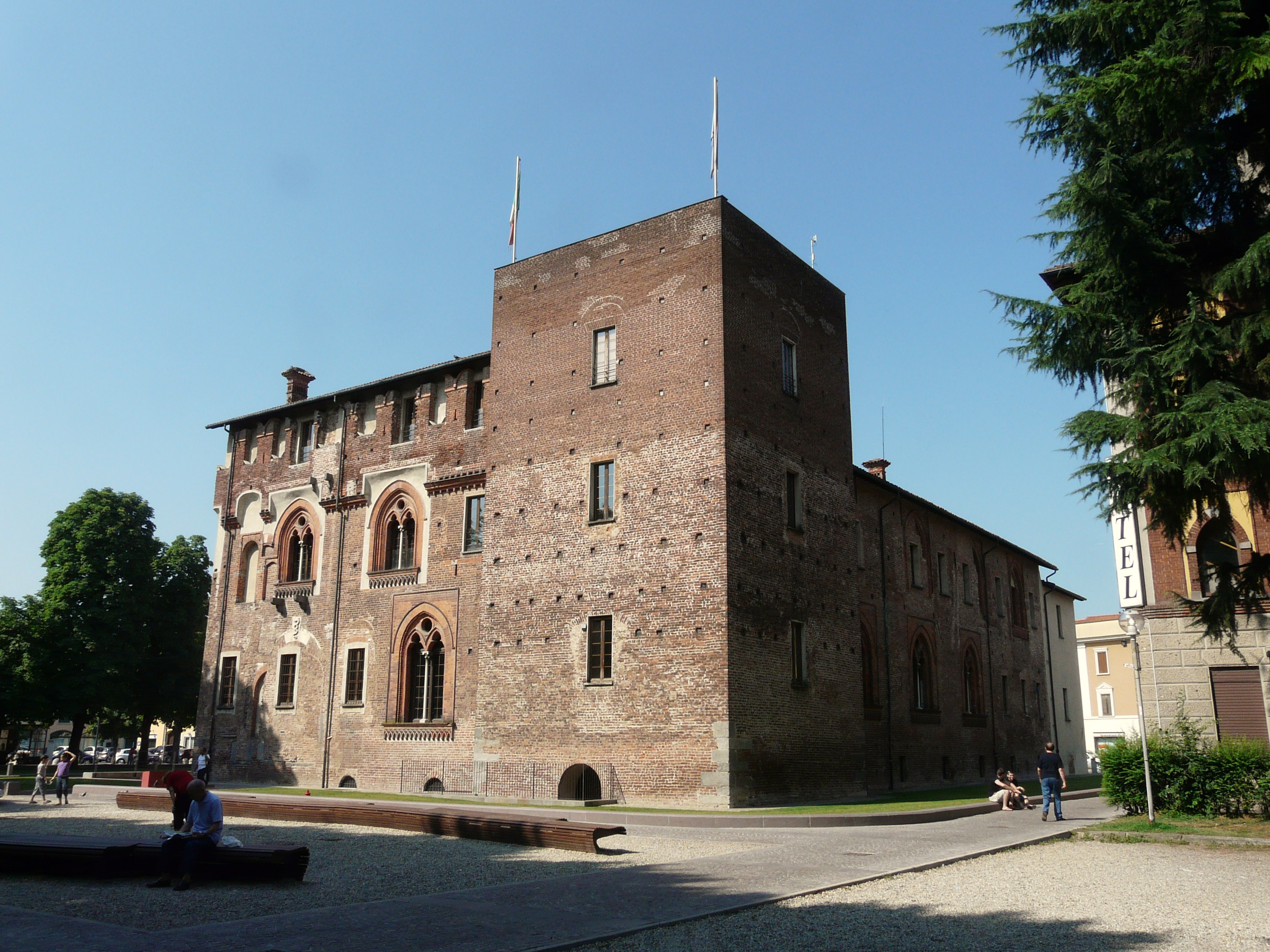
- The corner of the castle with the restored remains of the tower

Site information
- Type: Medieval castle
- Owner: Municipality of Abbiategrasso
- Open to the public: Yes
- Condition: Good (survived portion)

Location
- Coordinates: 45°23′54″N 8°55′10″E

Site history
- Built: 14th century
- Built by: Azzone Visconti, Gian Galeazzo Visconti, Filippo Maria Visconti
- Materials: Bricks

The Visconti Castle of Abbiategrasso is a medieval castle in Abbiategrasso, Lombardy, northern Italy. It was among the first Visconti castles built according to their typical quadrangular layout. In the 14th and 15th centuries, it was one of the preferred residences of the duchesses of Milan of the Visconti and Sforza houses. Today, the castle's surviving part serves as the seat of the municipality of Abbiategrasso.

== History ==
The Visconti Castle of Abbiategrasso was built at the end of the 13th century on the site of a previous fortification (Castro Margazario) near a Benedictine monastery. First, Azzone Visconti (1329–1339), Lord of Milan, and then Gian Galeazzo Visconti (1378–1402), the first Duke of Milan, enlarged the castle. In 1438 it was restored and embellished by Duke Filippo Maria Visconti, son of Gian Galeazzo. After losing its defensive function and being easily reachable from Milan by water along the Naviglio Grande, it became his favorite country mansion.

The castle had a quadrangular layout, with an internal courtyard and portico, and four towers, one on each corner. Bricks were the primary construction material, while the stone was limited to structural or decorative elements, such as the slender columns of the mullioned windows, the brackets (beccatelli), or the Biscione on the façade over the old entrance. It was entirely decorated with brightly colored frescoes

It had been the prerogative of the Visconti duchesses of Milan. Agnese del Maino, Duke Filippo Maria Visconti's mistress, had a stable residence in Abbiategrasso as an alternative to Cusago, and their daughter, Bianca Maria Visconti], grew up in the castle. The members of the Sforza house, descendants of Bianca Maria Visconti and her husband Francesco Sforza, favored the castle to emphasize their Visconti origins. In 1469, Gian Galeazzo Sforza, Duke of Milan, was born there, and in 1480, it became the permanent residence of the widowed duchess Bona of Savoy

After restructuring the castles of Cusago, Gambolò, and Vigevano, the Sforza court resided less frequently in Abbiategrasso. After the Visconti-Sforza period, the castle became a stronghold again, especially during the years of the Italian Wars (1494–1559). In 1658 three towers and the southern wing were demolished, while the fourth was cut off. In 1862 the Abbiategrasso municipality bought the castle. In the following years, the ramparts were obliterated to make space for the new train station while also taking care of some restorations.

== Today ==
Although deprived of the south wing and three towers, the castle is today in good condition and open to the public. It houses the offices and the City Council of the Abbiategrasso municipality. Traces of the decorative frescoes are preserved in the courtyard and some interior rooms.

== Sources ==
- Conti, Flavio; Hybsch, Vincenzo; Vincenti, Antonello (1990). I castelli della Lombardia. Provincie di Milano e Pavia (in Italian). Novara: Istituto Geografico de Agostini. ISBN 9788840291086. OCLC 635639773.
- Del Tredici, Federico; Rossetti, Edoardo (2012). Castle trails from Milan to Bellinzona - Guide to the dukedom's castles. Milan: Nexi-Castelli del ducato. ISBN 9788896451069. OCLC 955635027. Archived from the original on July 13, 2024.
