= Visconti-Sforza Castle (Galliate) =

Castle in northern Italy

- Castello Visconteo-Sforzesco di Galliate
- Galliate, Piedmont, Northern Italy
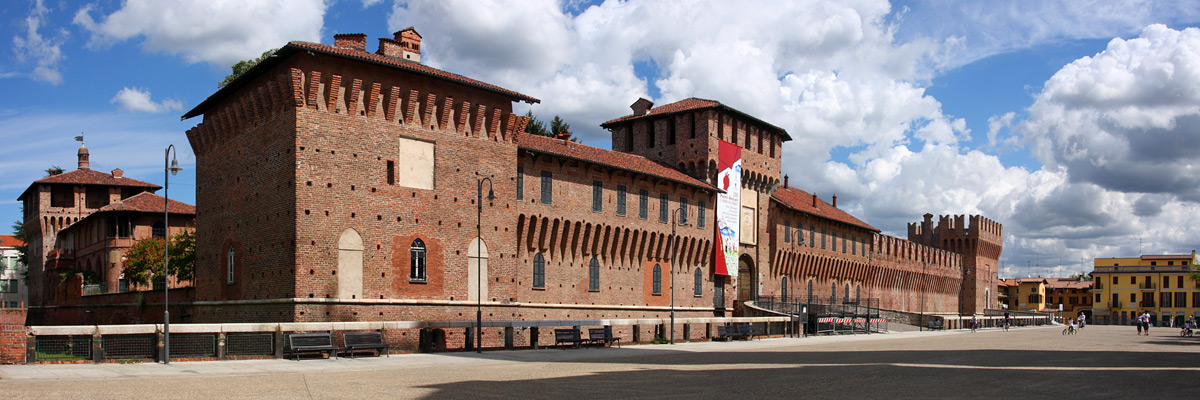
- Front of the castle

Site information
- Type: Medieval castle
- Owner: Municipality of Galliate; private
- Open to the public: Yes
- Condition: Good

Location
- Coordinates: 45°28′43″N 8°41′46″E
- Length: 108 m (354 ft)

Site history
- Built: 15th century
- Built by: Visconti, Sforza houses
- Materials: Bricks

The Visconti-Sforza Castle or Sforza Castle of Galliate is a medieval castle in Galliate, Piedmont, Northern Italy. It was erected in the 15th century by the Sforza, dukes of Milan, on a previous fortification (the Rocchetta) built by their progenitors Visconti.

== Location ==
Galliate lies along the road between Novara and Milan, near a transit point on the Ticino river. This position was at the origin of the importance of Galliate in the Late Middle Ages.

== History ==
The castle, or some fortification surrounded by a moat, existed in 1057. A document of that year attests the existence of a chapel built «iusta moato de castro ipsius loci» (Latin for "near the moat of the castle of that place").

In 1154, Federico Barbarossa destroyed the fortifications near the Ticino river defended by the Milanese, and among them, Galliate. In 1168 Galliate was occupied by the Milanese, who rebuilt the fortification. Between the 12th and the 13th century, the castle was attacked and ruined by the Novara people.

After being taken by the Visconti, the castle was rebuilt by Galeazzo II Visconti in 1350-60 as an outpost near the Ticino river's bridgehead. In 1414 Filippo Maria Visconti had the Rocchetta built on the eastern side of the current castle area.

In 1476, the Duke of Milan Galeazzo Maria Sforza began constructing the castle in the forms we see today. The building was completed in 1496 under the rule of Ludovico il Moro. A canal was excavated to bring water into the moat surrounding the castle. The building had an overall rectangular layout. Its sides measured 108 m (354 ft) and 80 m (260 ft).

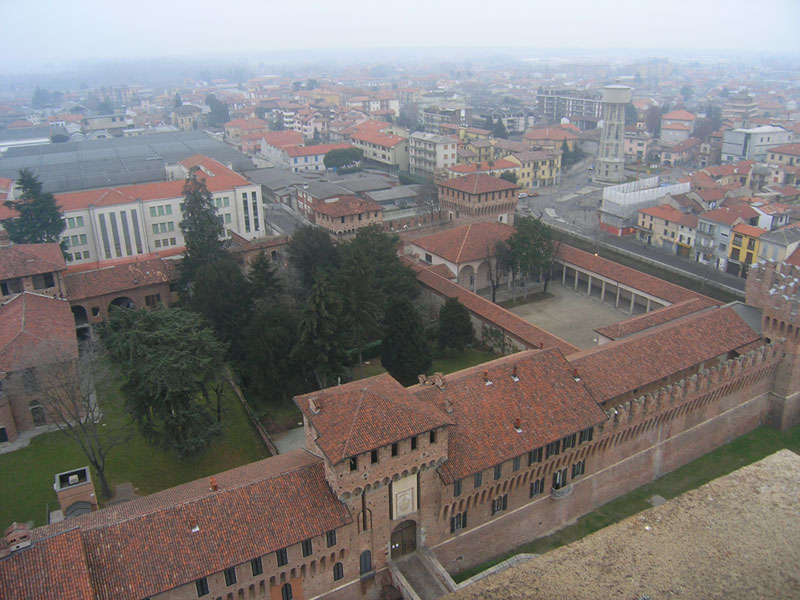
The eastern portion of the castle seen from the nearby church's bell tower

In 1717, the castle passed from the Sforza to Luchino del Maino, and then to their heirs. Their property was eventually divided and sold to private individuals. Later, the Galliate municipality took over and subsequently restored a part of the castle.

== Today ==
The facade of the castle occupies the entire northern side of the central Piazza Vittorio Veneto.

Partly private and partly owned by the municipality, the castle houses the civic library, the Angelo Bozzola Museum of Contemporary Art, and the Achille Varzi Museum, dedicated to the Grand-Prix driver born in Galliate.

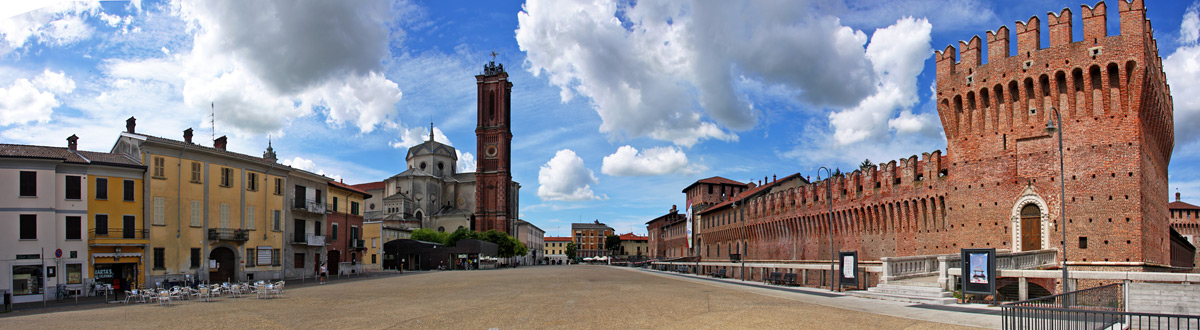
Panoramic view of Piazza Vittorio Veneto

== Sources ==
- Conti, Flavio (1975). I castelli del Piemonte. Tomo I (in Italian). Milano: Görlich Editore.
- Del Tredici, Federico; Rossetti, Edoardo (2012). Percorsi castellani: da Milano a Bellinzona: guida ai castelli del ducato (in Italian). Castelli del ducato. ISBN 9788896451021.
