= Visconti Castle (Invorio) =

- Invorio
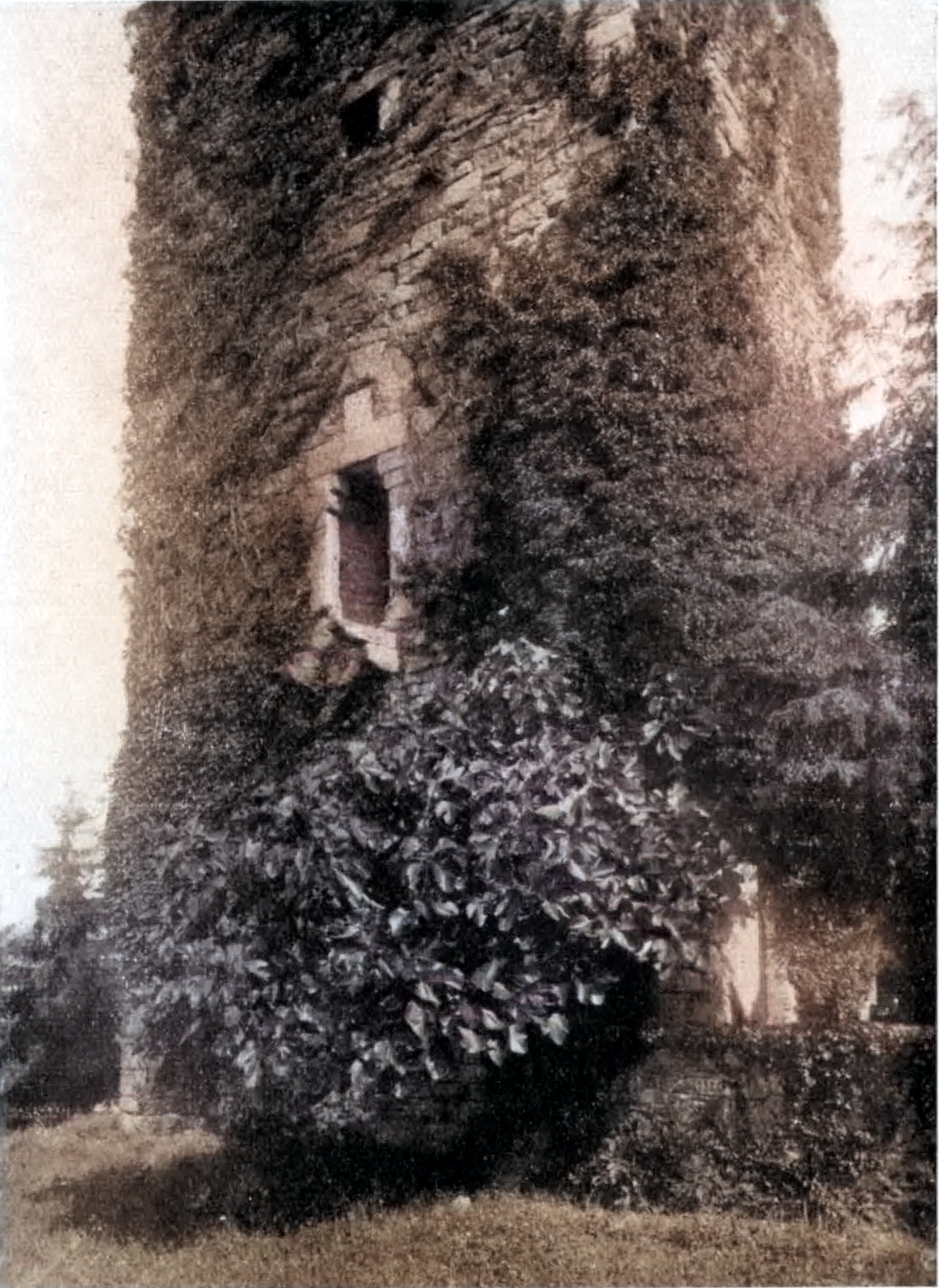
- The surviving tower of the castle

Site information
- Type: Medieval castle
- Open to the public: No
- Condition: Destroyed (only a tower has been preserved)

Location
- Coordinates: 45°45′30″N 8°29′17″E

Site history
- Built: 11th century
- Built by: Counts of Biandrate, Visconti
- In use: 11th–14th centuries

The Visconti Castle of Invorio was a mediaeval castle located in Invorio, Province of Novara, Piedmont, northern Italy. Only a tower today survives, surrounded by the traces of the ancient walls. Matteo I Visconti, Lord of Milan, was born there in 1250.

== History ==
The first account of a fortification at Invorio dates back to the 11th century. At that time the site was a possession of the counts of Biandrate. In the 12th and 13th centuries the castle went under the control of the Novara commune, to finally become a property of the Visconti of Milan. Since that time it had been a residence of the Visconti di Invorio, a collateral branch of the Visconti of Milan.

Between 1356 and 1358, the castle was heavily damaged during the war that opposed the Visconti to the Marquess of Monferrato. After the castle's demise, the Visconti di Invorio families moved to the nearby area, where they built new houses and a 16th-century villa. In 1742 Alberto Visconti d'Aragona, a member of another Visconti branch, obtained the title of Marquess of Invorio.

== Current remains ==
The area of the ancient castle is isolated on the summit of a relief, surrounded by streets overlooked by the old Visconti houses and villas. The access to the castle was probably located in Via Martinotti, few meters before the surviving tower, where a front gate surmounted by a Biscione carved in stone is visible. Another Biscione can be seen above the entrance door of the tower.

== Image gallery ==
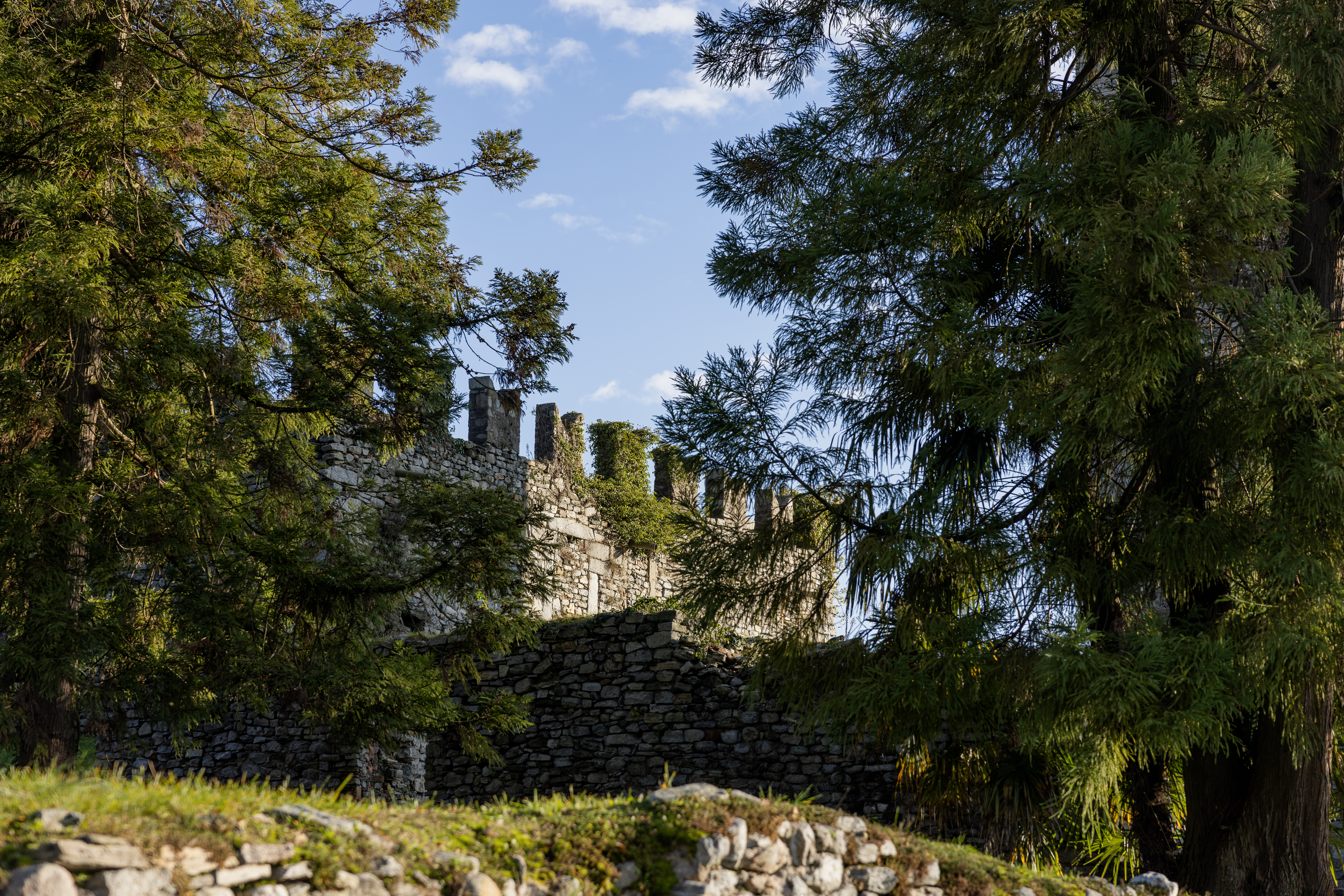
Detail of the walls surrounding the surviving Tower of the Visconti Castle of Invorio

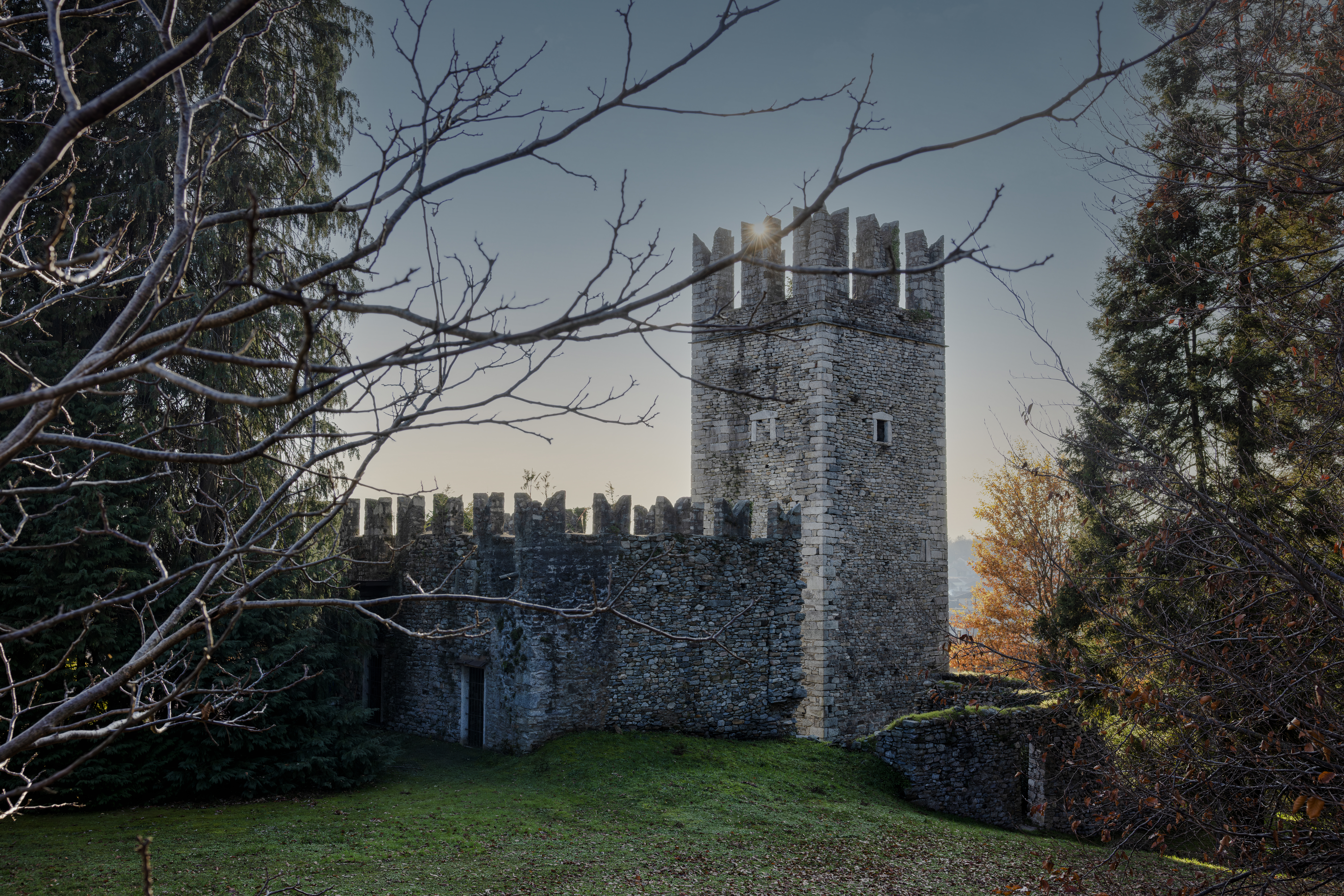
The tower and the surviving walls of the Visconti castle of Invorio

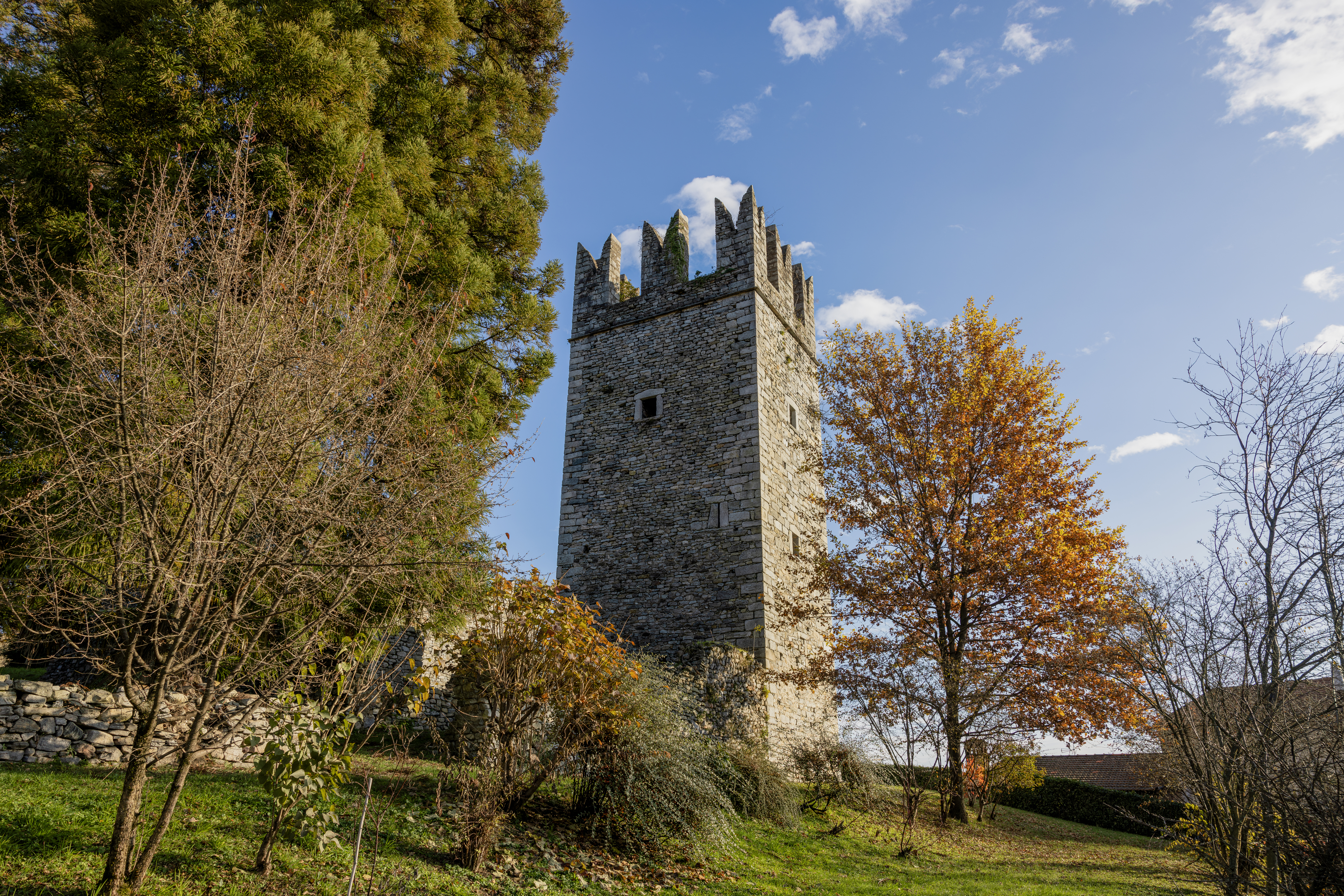
The tower of the Visconti castle of Invorio
