= Visconti Castle (Voghera) =

- Castello Visconteo di Voghera
- Voghera, Lombardy, Northern Italy
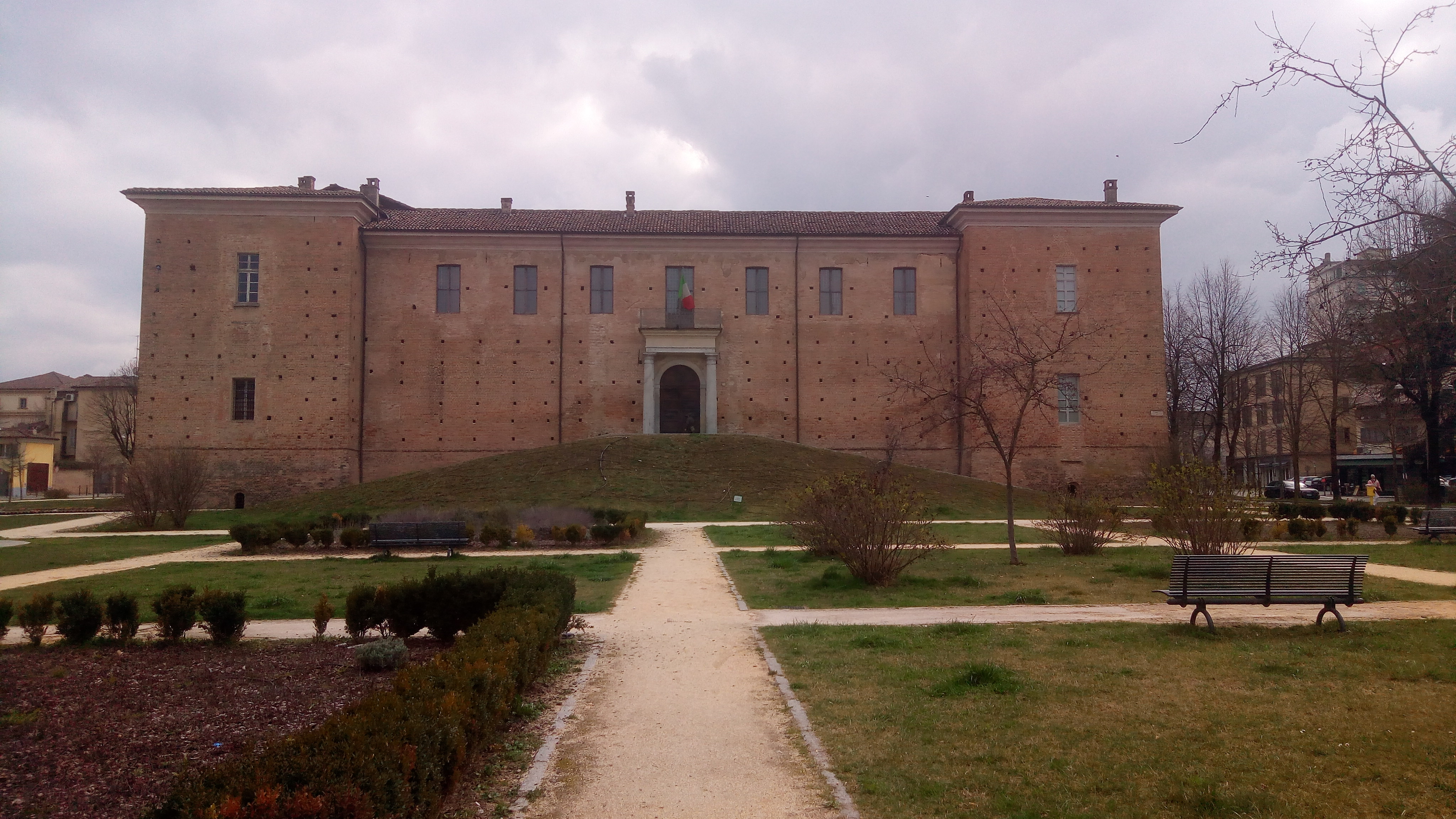
- Winter view of the northern facade

Site information
- Type: Medieval castle, noble residence
- Owner: Italian State
- Open to the public: Occasionally, for exhibitions or cultural events
- Condition: Good

Location
- Coordinates: 44°59′21″N 9°00′33″E

Site history
- Built: 1335–1372
- Built by: Azzone Visconti and Galeazzo II Visconti
- Materials: Bricks

The Visconti Castle of Voghera is a medieval castle in Voghera, Lombardy, Northern Italy. It was built in the 14th century by the Visconti, lords and dukes of Milan.

== History ==
The castle was initiated by Azzone Visconti in 1335 and completed by Galeazzo II Visconti in 1372. Its design followed the typical quadrangular shape of the Visconti castles with an internal courtyard surrounded by arcades and a tower for each corner. However, in Voghera, a simple wall closes one side.

The castle laid on the border between the Voghera city (to the north) and the countryside (to the south). Two additional towers were built on the northern and southern sides, over the two entrances. A moat surrounded the castle. Two drawbridges, on both sides of the castle, crossed the ditch.

In the following centuries, the castle underwent mutilations. The towers at the four corners were shortened. In 1647, during the Franco-Spanish War (1635–1659), the French demolished the tower over the north entrance. In the 18th century, the north wing was transformed into a residential palace. In the 19th century, the moat was filled with earth.

Since the Napoleonic era, the castle had been used as a prison. Ceased this use, the first restorations began in the 1920s. The restoration ended at the beginning of the 21st century, allowing the opening of the castle to the public. In the east wing, fragments of frescoes attributed to Bartolomeo Suardi, a 15th-century painter, were revealed and restored.

== Today ==
The castle is the property of the Italian State. Periodically it is open for exhibitions and cultural events.

== Sources ==
- Conti, Flavio; Hybsch, Vincenzo; Vincenti, Antonello (1990). I castelli della Lombardia. Provincie di Milano e Pavia (in Italian). Novara: Istituto Geografico de Agostini. ISBN 88-402-9108-3.
