= Massino Visconti =

- Comune
- Comune di Massino Visconti
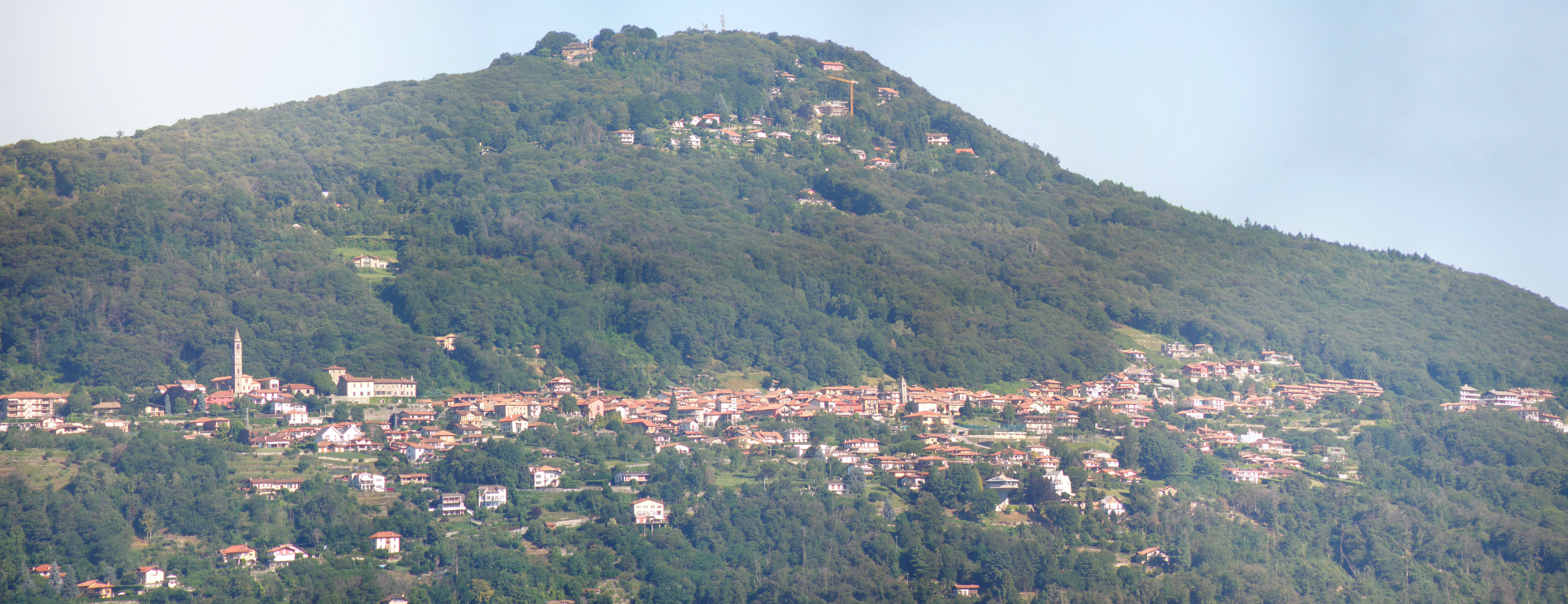
- Massino Visconti, as seen from Ranco, on the opposite bank of Lake Maggiore

- Coat of arms

- Location within Italy Location within Piedmont
- Coordinates: 45°49′N 8°32′E
- Country: Italy
- Region: Piedmont
- Province: Novara (NO)
- Frazioni: Monte, San Salvatore

Government
  - Mayor: Angela Buzzi

Area
  - Total: 6.8 km^{2} (2.6 sq mi)
- Elevation: 465 m (1,526 ft)

Population (Dec. 2004)
  - Total: 1,106
  - Density: 160/km^{2} (420/sq mi)
- Demonym: Massinesi
- Time zone: UTC+1 (CET)
  - Summer (DST): UTC+2 (CEST)
- Postal code: 28040
- Dialing code: 0322
- Website: Official website

Massino Visconti (usually called simply Massino) is a municipality in the Province of Novara, in the Italian region of Piedmont, located about 110 kilometres (68 mi) northeast of Turin and about 40 kilometres (25 mi) north of Novara.

Massino Visconti is bordered by the municipalities of Armeno, Brovello-Carpugnino, Lesa and Nebbiuno.

Massino got the suffix "Visconti" from the House of Visconti of Milan, an important noble family in medieval Italy, who were initially the lords of Massino.
