= Visconti Castle (Cusago) =

- Castello Visconteo di Cusago
- Cusago, Lombardy, Northern Italy
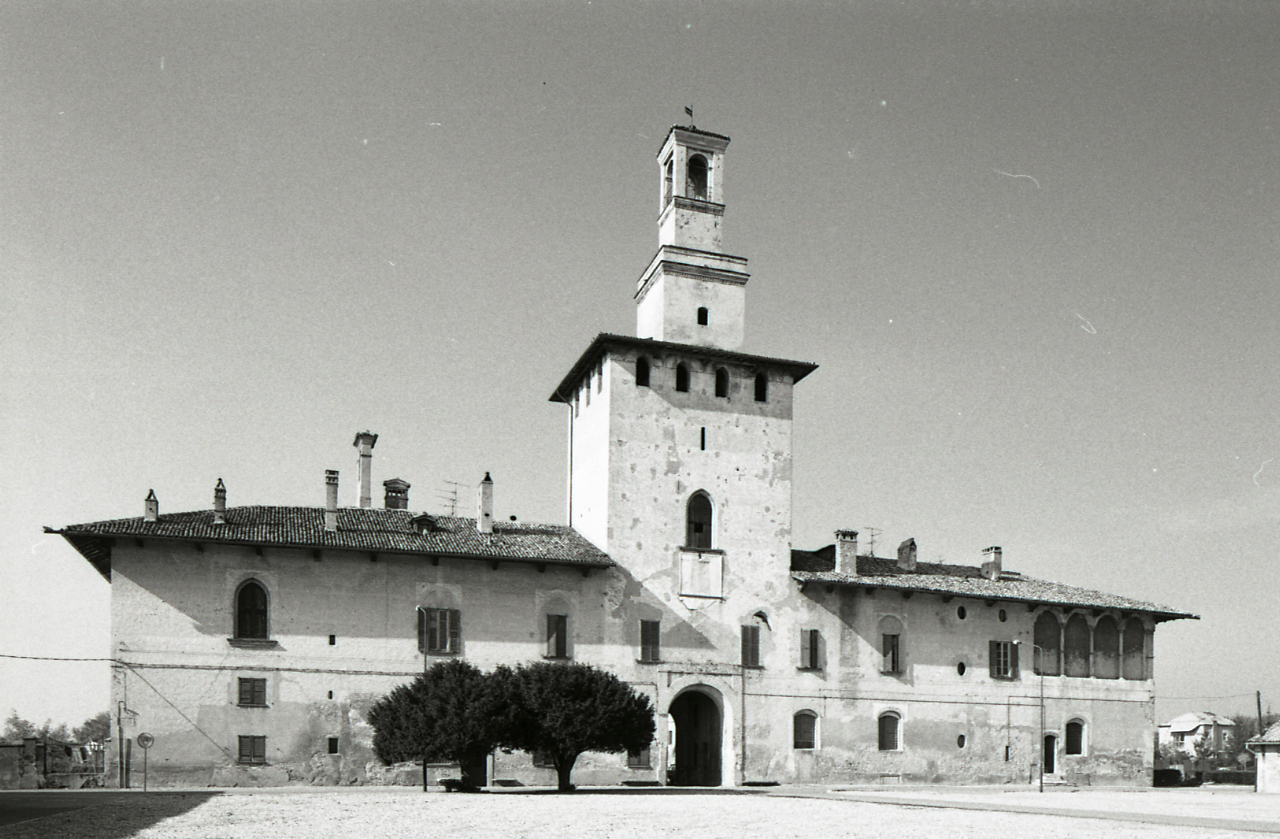
- The castle in a photo by Paolo Monti

Site information
- Type: Medieval castle, noble residence
- Owner: Private
- Condition: Neglected

Location
- Location within Northern Italy
- Coordinates: 45°26′45″N 9°01′55″E
- Length: 96 m (315 ft)

Site history
- Built: 14th–15th centuries
- Built by: Bernabò Visconti, Ludovico il Moro

The Visconti Castle, or Castello Visconteo, is a castle located in the town of Cusago near Milan, Lombardy, Northern Italy. It was built in the 14th century by Bernabò Visconti and used as a hunting lodge by him and other Visconti family members. The castle underwent significant changes in the Renaissance period; today, it is in neglected conditions.

== History ==
Bernabò Visconti was lord of Milan between 1354 and 1385. He ordered the construction of the castle of Cusago in 1370. It had a quadrilateral layout, and a single tower over the entrance, features conserved until today. It was created as a country residence and connected to a hunting park. The most extended side measured 96 meters.

The court of Bernabò Visconti frequently attended the castle. After the dethronement of Bernabò, the building passed to his nephew Gian Galeazzo, the first duke of Milan. Between 1425 and 1440, Duke Filippo Maria Visconti took great care of the castle and the surrounding park. His mistress Agnese del Maino occasionally lived there. In 1438 a little canal (the naviglietto) was excavated to connect the castle to the nearby Naviglio Grande.

After the period of the Ambrosian Republic (1447-1450), the castle was abandoned, and part of its land was sold. In 1496, Ludovico il Moro expanded it, restoring its function of a country villa for hunting and parties. A portico with eight arches was added to the side of the courtyard near the entrance. A loggia was inserted externally in the north-eastern corner. The tower assumed the shape with the overlapping volumes, typical of the Sforza architecture, as it appears at the Castello Sforzesco in Milan.

In 1496, Ludovico il Moro hosted in the castle the emperor Maximilian I. Later, and until the 20th century, it was used as an agriculture warehouse and home for farmers. The external loggia was closed by a wall.

== Today ==
Ceased its agricultural use, the castle was abandoned. Today it is in a poor state of repair, awaiting restoration.

The castle stands as a backdrop to the Cusago central square. The church of Saints Firmus and Rusticus faces on the opposite side.

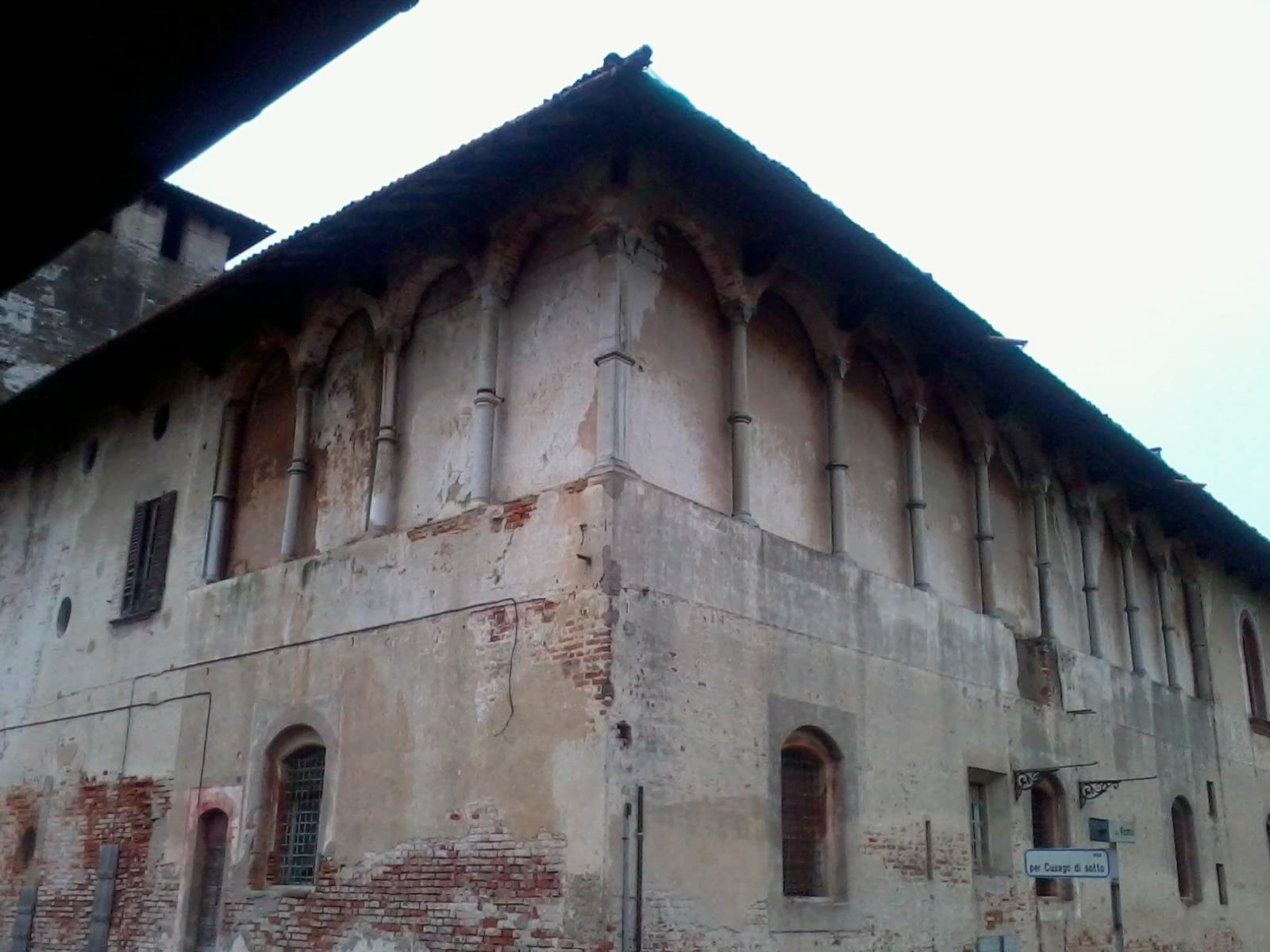
The loggia, now walled, of the north-eastern corner

== Sources ==
- Conti, Flavio; Hybsch, Vincenzo; Vincenti, Antonello (1990). I castelli della Lombardia. Provincie di Milano e Pavia (in Italian). Novara: Istituto Geografico de Agostini. ISBN 88-402-9108-3.
- Del Tredici, Federico; Rossetti, Edoardo (2012). Castle trails from Milan to Bellinzona - Guide to the dukedom's castles. Milan: Nexi-Castelli del ducato. Archived from the original on 2024-07-13.
