= Conti =

Conti is an Italian surname.

== Geographical distribution ==
As of 2014, 63.5% of all known bearers of the surname Conti were residents of Italy (frequency 1:756), 11.8% of the United States (1:24,071), 9.2% of Brazil (1:17,439), 6.3% of Argentina (1:5,300), 2.5% of France (1:21,201) and 1.3% of the Philippines (1:58,961).

In Italy, the frequency of the surname was higher than national average (1:756) in the following regions:

1. Tuscany (1:360)
2. Umbria (1:363)
3. Marche (1:370)
4. Lazio (1:412)
5. Emilia-Romagna (1:478)
6. Lombardy (1:531)
7. Sicily (1:624)
8. Liguria (1:628)

In Argentina, the frequency of the surname was higher than national average (1:5,300) in the following provinces:

1. Santa Fe Province (1:3,222)
2. Córdoba Province (1:3,292)
3. Buenos Aires (1:4,110)
4. Mendoza Province (1:4,201)
5. Buenos Aires Province (1:4,408)
6. La Pampa Province (1:4,731)

== People ==
- The historical Conti di Segni, family
  - Andrea dei Conti (1240–1302), Italian Roman Catholic priest
  - Giovanni dei Conti di Segni (died 1213), Italian cardinal
  - Giovanni Conti (cardinal) (1414–1493), Italian cardinal
  - Francesco Conti (cardinal) (died 1521), Italian cardinal
  - Lotario dei Conti di Segni, Pope Innocent III (1160 or 1161 – 16 July 1216), Italian pope
  - Michelangelo Conti, Pope Innocent XIII (1655–1724), Italian pope
  - Ottaviano dei Conti di Segni (died 1234), Italian cardinal
  - Torquato Conti (1591–1636), 17th-century Italian military officer
  - Ugolino di Conti, Pope Gregory IX (c. 1145/70 – 22 August 1241), Italian pope
- a surname derived from the toponym Conty, France (cf. Princes of Conti)
  - Louis Armand II de Bourbon, prince de Conti, Prince of Conti from 1709 to 1727
- Al Conti (born 1968), Grammy-nominated New Age composer, arranger, producer, and multi-instrumentalist
- Albert Conti (1887–1967), Austrian-Hungarian-born Italian-American film actor
- Alberto Coletti Conti (1885–?), Italian sports shooter
- Alberto Conti (born 1966), astrophysicist
- Aldo Conti (1890–1988), Italian painter
- Alex Conti (born 1952), German guitarist
- Alexander Conti (born 1993), Canadian actor
- Andrea Conti (footballer, born 1977), Italian football player
- Andrea Conti (footballer, born 1994), Italian football player
- Anita Conti (1899–1997), French-Armenian explorer and photographer
- Antonio Schinella Conti (1677–1749), Italian historian, mathematician, philosopher and physicist
- Arnaldo Conti (1885–1919), Italian conductor of opera
- Augusto Conti (1822–1905), Italian philosopher and educationist
- Bernardino de' Conti (died 1525), Italian painter
- Bill Conti (born 1942), film music director
- Bob Conti (born 1947), American percussionist, record producer, songwriter, singer
- Bruno Conti (born 1955), former football player and member of the Italy national football team in 1982
- Carlo Conti (born 1961), Italian television presenter
- Carlos Conti (1916–1975), Spanish comic writer
- Chiara Conti (born 1973), Italian actress
- Christian Conti (born 1987), Italian football player
- Daniele Conti (born 1979), Italian football player
- Diana Conti (1956–2024), Argentine lawyer and politician
- Elena Conti (born 1967), Italian biochemist and molecular biologist
- Elmer W. Conti (1921–1988), American businessman and politician
- Enio Conti (1913–2005), former US NFL player
- Ettore Conti (1871–1972), Italian civil engineer, electricity industrialist, and businessman
- Evan Conti (born 1993), American-Israeli basketball player and coach
- Fabio Conti, Italian water polo coach
- Febo Conti (1926–2012), Italian TV and radio presenter
- Flora Di Conti (1898–1952), an early direct disciple of Paramahansa Yogananda
- Francesca Conti (born 1972), female water polo goalkeeper
- Francesco Bartolomeo Conti (1681–1732), Florentine composer
- Francesco Conti (painter) (1681–1760), Italian artist
- Fulvio Conti (born 1947), Italian financier
- Gabriella Conti Armellini (1891-1974), Italian astronomer
- Gene Conti (born 1946), American government official
- Germán Conti (born 1994), Argentine footballer
- Giacomo Conti (artist) (1813–1888), Italian painter
- Giacomo Conti (bobsledder) (1918–1992), Italian bobsledder
- Gianmarco Conti (born 1992), Italian professional footballer
- Gioacchino Conti (1714–1761), 18th-century castrato singer
- Gregorio Conti, birthname of antipope Victor IV
- Gregory Conti (1874–1919), Italian mafioso and boss of the Pittsburgh Mafia family in the 1910s
- Gustavo de Conti (born 1980), Brazilian professional basketball coach
- Guy Conti (1942–2026), American baseball coach
- Haroldo Conti (1925–1976), Argentine writer, screenwriter, teacher, and Latin professor
- Italia Conti (1873–1946), English actress
- Ivan Conti, drummer with the band Azymuth
- Jason Conti (1975–2025), American outfielder in Major League Baseball
- Jesse Corti (born 1955), a Venezuelan-American actor and voice actor
- Jim Conti, a member of Streetlight Manifesto
- Joe Conti (born 1954), president of the Pennsylvania Association of Broadcasters
- John Conti, the founder of the john conti Coffee Company
- Joy Flowers Conti (born 1948), a Chief United States District Judge
- Kathleen Conti, member of the Colorado House of Representatives
- Laura Conti (1921–1993), Italian anti-fascist partisan and a figure for Italian environmentalism
- Leonardo Conti (1900–1945), German hockey player
- Leonardo Conti (1900–1945), Swiss physician
- Leopoldo Conti (1901–1970), Italian professional football player and coach
- Luigi Conti (nuncio) (1929–2015), Roman Catholic archbishop and diplomat
- Marco Conti (born 1969), Captain Regent of San Marino
- Mariana Conti (born 1985), Brazilian sociologist and politician
- Mario Conti (1934–2022), Scottish Roman Catholic prelate
- Mario Sergio Conti (born 1954), Brazilian journalist and writer
- Marzio Conti (born 1960), Italian conductor and flautist
- Matías Conti (born 1990), Argentine football striker
- Michele Conti (born 1983), Italian Grand Prix motorcycle racer
- Natale Conti, an Italian mythographer, poet, humanist and historian
- Neil Conti (born 1959), English drummer and music producer
- Niccolò Da Conti, 15th-century Venetian merchant and explorer
- Nina Conti (born 1973), ventriloquist and daughter of Tom Conti
- Norman Conti (born 1972), American sociologist
- Pamela Conti (born 1982), Italian football attacking midfielder
- Paolo Conti (born 1950), former Italian football goalkeeper
- Petra Conti (born 1988), Italian ballerina
- Piero Gadda Conti (1902–1999), Italian novelist and film critic
- Piero Ginori Conti (1865–1939), businessman and Italian politician
- Rafael Conti (1746–1814), colonel in the Spanish Army
- Raúl Conti (1928–2008), Argentine professional football player
- Richard Conti (1937–2016), Judge of the Federal Court of Australia
- Robert Conti (born 1945), American guitarist
- Roberto Conti (cyclist), Italian cyclist
- Roberto Conti (mathematician) (1923–2006), Italian mathematician
- Samuel Conti (1922–2018), United States federal judge
- Servílio Conti (1916–2014), an Italian Prelate of the Roman Catholic Church
- Stefano Conti, Italian 18th century merchant from Lucca
- Taynara Conti (born 1995), Brazilian professional wrestler and former judoka
- Tito Conti (1842–1924), Italian painter
- Tom Conti (born 1941), Scottish actor, theatre director, and novelist
- Ugo Conti (born 1955), Italian actor
- Valerio Conti (born 1993), Italian cyclist
- Walt Conti (born 1959), special effects artist

== See also ==
- "Conti", an abbreviation for the German automobile part manufacturer Continental AG
- Estadio Raúl Conti, a multi-purpose stadium in Puerto Madryn, Argentina
- Motta de' Conti, a comune (municipality) in the Province of Vercelli in the Italian region Piedmont
- Prince of Conti, a title of nobility; cadet house of Bourbon-Condé
- Serra de' Conti, a comune (municipality) in the Province of Ancona in the Italian region Marche
- Silviniaco Conti, a French-bred, British-trained Selle Francais racehorse
- Princess of Conti

=== Disambiguation pages ===
- Andrea Conti (disambiguation)
- Cardinal Conti (disambiguation)
- Francesco Conti (disambiguation)
- Giacomo Conti (disambiguation)
- Giovanni Conti (disambiguation)
- Luigi Conti (disambiguation)
