= Cardinals created by Innocent III =

Catholic appointments from 1198 to 1216

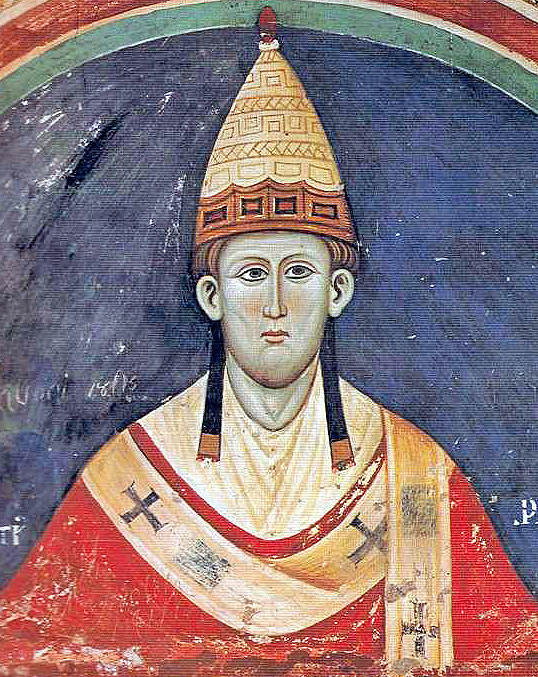
Pope Innocent III.

Pope Innocent III (r. 1198–1216) created 41 cardinals in ten consistories that he conducted throughout his pontificate. This included - in his first allocation in late 1198 - a future successor.

== December 1198 ==
- Ugolino dei Conti di Segni (Note: Elected as Pope Gregory IX in 1227 and reigned until his death in 1241.)
- Gérard O. Cist.

== December 1200 ==
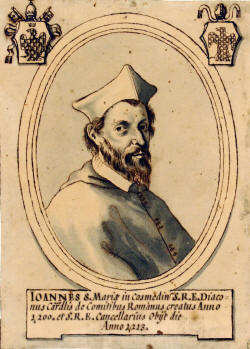
Giovanni Conti di Segni was created a cardinal in December 1200.

- Gregorio
- Benedetto, Cardinal-priest of Porto e Santa Rufina
- Leone Brancaleone Can. Reg.
- Matteo
- Giovanni dei Conti di Segni

== December 1202 ==
- Roger
- Gualterio
- Raoul de Neuville

== 1205 ==
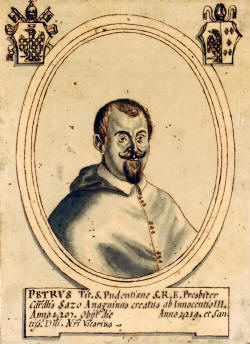
Pietro Sasso was created a cardinal in 1205.

- Nicola de Romanis
- Guido Pierleone
- Pietro di Morra
- Uberto da Pirovano
- Giovanni da Ferentino
- Guala Bicchieri Can. Reg.
- Ottaviano dei Conti di Segni
- Giovanni Crescenzi
- Giovanni
- Paio Galvão O.S.B.
- Stephen Langton
- Pietro Sasso

== March 1206 ==
- Siegfried von Eppstein

== 1207 ==
- Pietro O.S.B. Cas.
- Mauro

== June 1211 ==
- Gerardo da Sesso O.Cist.

== 18 February 1212 ==
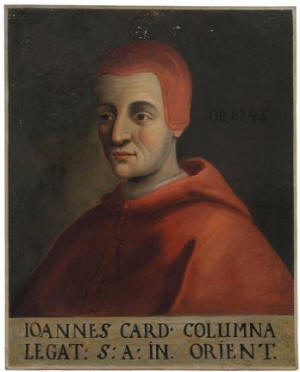
Giovanni Colona was created a cardinal on 18 February 1212.

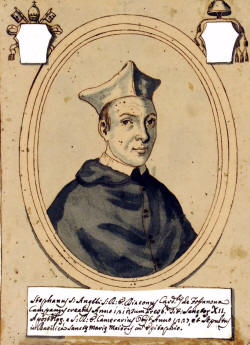
Stefano di Ceccano was created a cardinal on 18 February 1212.

- Angelo
- Giovanni Colonna
- Pierre Duacensis
- Bertrando
- Stefano di Ceccano O.Cist.
- Robert Curzon

== 1213 ==
- Rainiero Can. Reg.
- Giovanni Domenico Trinci

== 1216 ==
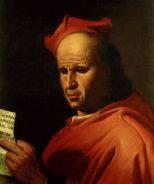
Raniero Capocci was created a cardinal in 1216.

- Gregorio Theodoli
- Raniero Capocci O.Cist.
- Romano Bonaventura
- Stefano Normandis dei Conti
- Tommaso da Capua
- Pietro Campano O.S.B. Cas.
- Aldobrandino Caetani

== Sources ==
- Miranda, Salvador. "Consistories for the creation of Cardinals 13th Century (1198-1303): Innocent III (1198-1216)". The Cardinals of the Holy Roman Church. Florida International University. OCLC 53276621.
