= 1954 in Italian television =

This is a list of Italian television related events from 1954.

== Events ==
- 3 January. After five years of experimentation, the speaker Fulvia Colombo announces from the Milan studios, the official beginning of the TV broadcasting on Italy. This is the schedule of the day:

11 AM	Inaugural ceremony, from the studios of Milan, Turin and Rome, with the three cities’ mayors, the Rome vicar cardinal Clemente Micara, the Minister of Communications Modesto Panetti and the RAI president Cristiano Ridomi.
2.30 PM	Arrivi e partenze – officially, the first show of Italian television
2.45 PM	Short film
3 PM	L’orchestra delle quindici (The 3 PM orchestra): musical show, hosted by Febo Conti
3.30 PM	Short film
3.45 PM	Sport
5.30 PM	Le miserie del signor Travet (His young wife) by Mario Soldati – the first movie broadcast by Italian television
7 PM	Art documentary about Giovanbattista Tiepolo (first Italian educational TV show).
8.45 PM	News (read by the speaker Riccardo Paladini and fully dedicated to the inaugural ceremony)
9,15 PM	Teleclub – talk-show
9,45 PM	L’osteria della posta (The mail tavern) – comedy by Carlo Goldoni, directed by Franco Enriquez, with Isa Barzizza, the first play broadcast by the Italian television
10,45 PM	Settenote (Seven notes) - musical show.
11,15 PM	La Domenica sportiva (The sporty Sunday)

The TV signal covers Northern Italy, Rome and the Tyrrhenian side of Central Italy. The transmissions last four hours and a quarter by day (from 5:30 to 11:30 PM, with a pause from 7 to 8:45; from 11 AM to 4 PM and from 5 PM to 11:30 PM during the holidays). The TV programming relies on music, plays and films; the news are strictly institutional and focused on the official ceremonies. The subscribers to the new media are initially just 90, but a month later they number already 24,000 people.

- 26 January. The first Italian teleplay, La Domenica di un fidanzato (see below) is aired.
- 29 January. First live broadcast of a football match (Italy-Egypt, from San Siro Stadium, valid for the 1954 World Cup qualification). The commentators are Carlo Bacarelli, Vittorio Veltroni (father of Walter) and Nicolò Carosio, historical voice of the sport on radio. In June, the 1954 football world cup is the first major sport event followed by the Italian television.
- January–March: The RAI publishes its “TV self-discipline code”, inspired by the moral criteria of the Centro cattolico Cinematografico (Catholic Cinematografic Center).
- 28 February. First live broadcast of a current event (the carnival of Viareggio).
- 26 March: First political debate, about the taxman, with the ministers Ezio Vanoni and Roberto Tremelloni.
- 10 April. RAI changes its business name from Radio Audizioni Italiane (Italian Radio Auditions) to Radio Televisione Italiana (Italian Radio Television).
- 18 April: For Easter, RAI broadcasts the “Urbi et Orbi” blessing of Pope Pius XII, who is the first pope to appear on TV.
- 23 April. First opera (The Barber of Seville) realized in the studio, directed by Franco Enriquez.
- 3 June. The Catholic Filiberto Guala is appointed RAI's Delegate Manager. His most important choice is the assumption, after a formative course, of three hundred young intellectuals (the so-called “white corsairs”) to balance the influence of the ancient managers (generally liberals or former fascists). Among the “white corsairs”, there are people with a brilliant future, like Umberto Eco, Gianni Vattimo, Furio Colombo, Piero Angela and Andrea Camilleri.
- 6 June. RAI takes part to the Eurovision’s birth. Immediately after the opening show (the Narcissuses Feast, from Montreux), the Italian TV broadcasts for the whole Europe a speech by Pope Pius XII.
- 16 November. The first Italian miniseries, Il dottor Antonio (see below) is aired.
- 10 December. The fee for televisions is instituted. At the end of the year, the subscribers include 88,000 locations. Most of these TV tubes are located in public places, because of the high price of both the fee and the TV sets.

== Debuts ==
- Un, due, tre (One, two, three) – variety, directed by Mario Landi, lasted for six seasons. It is conceived as a parade of international stars, but soon the comic duo Ugo Tognazzi and Raimondo Vianello wins the audience's attention and becomes the focus of the show. Some of their sketches caricaturing other TV shows; as Mario Soldati's Travel in the Po valley, looking for genuine foods (with Vianello as the writer-gastronome) or the enquiry The working woman (with Tognazzi in woman dress) are very popular today again. After five years of huge critic and public success, the show is roughly suppressed, because of a sketch where the duo, using the freedom of the live broadcast, politely mocked the president Giovanni Gronchi.
- Una risposta per voi (An answer for you) – educational program, lasted 13 seasons. The university professor Alessandro Cutolo answers to the letters of the viewers on every subject.
- Passaporto (Passport) - course of English language for the young ones, care of Jole Giannini; 800 episodes.

== Television shows ==
=== Miniseries ===
- Il dottor Antonio ( Doctor Antonio) – in 4 episodes, from the Giovanni Ruffini's novel about the Italian Risorgimento, directed by Alberto Casella, with Luciano Alberici. It's the first Italian miniseries; its success, moreover among the female audience, will encourage RAI, in the following years, to carry on the production of period dramas.

=== Drama ===
- La domenica di un fidanzato (A boyfriend's Sunday) – by Ugo Buzzolan, directed by Mario Ferrero, with Giorgio De Lullo and Bianca Toccafondi. It's the first Italian teleplay, now lost. Buzzolan, later, will become the severe and authoritative TV critic of La Stampa.
- Il ventaglio (The fan) – by Carlo Goldoni, directed by Franco Enriquez and Carlo Lodovici.
- Right You Are (if you think so) by Luigi Pirandello, directed by Mario Landi, with Ubaldo Lay.

Giorgio Albertazzi is the first star of TV theatre. In 1954, he appears in:

- Cabdida, by George Bernard Shaw, directed by Mario Ferrero, with Laura Solari and Arnoldo Foà.
- Delitto e castigo (Crimes and punishment) – from the Dostoevsky’s novel, directed by Franco Enriquez, with Bianca Toccafondi.
- Come le foglie (Like the leaves) – by Giuseppe Giacosa, by Mario Ferrero, with Anna Miserocchi and Ivo Garrani; the moral collapse of a high-class family after the bankruptcy of his father.
- Romeo and Juliet – by Shakespeare, directed by Franco Enriquez, with Vira Silenti, and Leonardo Cortese.

=== Variety ===
- In quattro si viaggia meglio (Four people travel better) – the Quartetto Cetra debuts on television.
- I cinque sensi sono sei (Five senses are six) – with Elio Pandoli, Antonella Steni and Febo Conti; directed by Mario Landi.

=== Educational ===
- Musei d’Italia (Italian museums) – with Emilio Garroni.
- Le avventure della scienza (Science's adventures) – first program of popular science, care of Enrico Medi.

== Births ==
- 1 October - Milly Carlucci. television presenter
- 17 October - Daniela Poggi, actress and television presenter

== See also ==
- List of Italian films of 1954
