= Cardinal Conti =

Cardinal Conti may refer to:

- Bernardo Maria Conti (1664–1730), cardinal protector of San Bernardo alle Terme, Rome
- Carlo Conti (cardinal) (1556–1615)
- Francesco Conti (cardinal) (died 1521)
- Giannicolò Conti (1617-1698)
- Giovanni Conti (cardinal) (1414–1493)
- Giovanni dei Conti di Segni (died 1213)
- Gregorio Conti (died after 1139), cardinal and Pope (as Antipope Victor IV)
- Innocenzo Conti (1731–1785)
- Lucido Conti (died 1437), a participant in the 1431 papal conclave
- Michaelangelo Conti (1655–1724), cardinal and Pope (as Pope Innocent XIII)
- Niccolò dei Conti di Segni (13th century)
- Ottaviano dei Conti di Segni (died 1234)
- Pietro Paolo Conti (1689–1770), a cardinal created by Clement XIII
- Rinaldo dei Conti di Segni (died 1261), cardinal and Pope (as Pope Alexander IV)
- Ugolino di Conti (died 1241), cardinal and Pope (as Pope Gregory IX)
