= Sforza Castle (disambiguation) =

The Sforza Castle (Italian: Castello Sforzesco) is a castle in Milan, northern Italy.

Sforza Castle may also refer to:

- Sforza Castle Pinacoteca
- Visconti-Sforza Castle (Novara)
- Visconti-Sforza Castle (Vigevano)

== See also ==
- Visconti Castle (disambiguation)
- List of castles in Italy
