= Visconti Castle =

Visconti Castle (in Italian Castello Visconteo) may refer to a number of castles including:

- Visconti Castle (Abbiategrasso)
- Visconti Castle (Bereguardo)
- Visconti Castle (Binasco)
- Visconti Castle (Castelletto sopra Ticino)
- Visconti Castle (Cusago)
- Visconti Castle (Crenna)
- Visconti Castle (Invorio)
- Visconti Castle (Legnano)
- Visconti Castle (Lodi)
- Visconti Castle (Locarno)
- Visconti Castle (Massino)
- Visconti Castle (Pagazzano)
- Visconti Castle (Pandino)
- Visconti Castle (Pavia)
- Visconti Castle (Somma Lombardo)
- Visconti Castle (Vercelli)
- Visconti-Castelbarco Castle
- Visconti-Sforza Castle (Novara)
- Visconti-Sforza Castle (Vigevano)

== See also ==
- List of castles in Italy
- Visconti (disambiguation)
