= Segni (disambiguation) =

Segni is a town in the Lepini Mountains in the province of Rome, Italy.

Segni may also refer to:

== People ==
- Saint Bruno (bishop of Segni) (c.1047–1123), bishop of Segni and abbot of Montecassino
- Lotario de' Conti di Segni (1160/1–1216)), Pope Innocent III
- Segni (surname), Italian surname

== Other uses ==
- Bishop of Segni
- Conti di Segni, a noble family of Italy
- Segni (tribe), an ancient Belgian tribe reported by Julius Caesar
- Segni Pact, an Italian political party that formed around politician Mario Segni

== See also ==
- Conti, a surname, listing the Conti di Segni family
