= 1227 papal election =

Election of Catholic Pope Gregory IX

Papal election 1227

Dates and location
- 19 March 1227; Septizodium, Rome

Key officials
- Dean: Ugolino dei Conti
- Protopriest: Guala Bicchieri
- Protodeacon: Ottaviano dei Conti di Segni

Elected pope
- Ugolino dei Conti; Name taken: Gregory IX
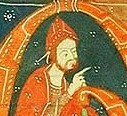

The 1227 papal election (19 March), was convoked after the death of Pope Honorius III on 18 March 1227 at Rome.

The cardinals present at Rome assembled in the Septizodium on the next day after the death of Honorius III and decided to elect the new Pope by compromissum, meaning not by the whole Sacred College of Cardinals but by the committee of few of them, empowered by the rest to appoint the new Pontiff. The same procedure had been already used in the previous election. The committee numbered three cardinals, among whom were cardinal-bishops Ugolino di Segni of Ostia and Konrad von Urach of Porto (the name of the third one is not registered). Initially the committee elected its member Konrad von Urach with two votes out three, but he refused the tiara. Hereupon the rest of cardinals unanimously elected Ugolino di Segni (another committee member) on 19 March 1227. He reluctantly accepted the high honour, taking the name of Gregory IX.

The new Pope received the pallium in the Vatican Basilica on 21 March 1227, and on the same day was enthroned in the Lateran Basilica. On 11 April 1227, his relative Ottaviano Conti di Segni, archdeacon of the Sacred College, solemnly crowned him in the Basilica di S. Maria in Maggiore.

== List of participants ==
Probably 15 out of 18 cardinals participated in the election:

Elector	Cardinalatial title	Elevated	Elevator	Other ecclesiastical titles	Notes
Ugolino di Segni	Bishop of Ostia e Velletri	19 December 1198	Innocent III	Dean of the Sacred College of Cardinals	Cardinal-nephew; elected Pope Gregory IX
Pelagio Galvani	Bishop of Albano	ca. 1206/1207	Innocent III		
Nicola de Chiaramonte, O.Cist.	Bishop of Frascati	6 January 1219	Honorius III		
Konrad von Urach, O.Cist.	Bishop of Porto e Santa Rufina	6 January 1219	Honorius III		Elected Pope but declined
Oliver von Paderborn	Bishop of Sabina	September 1225	Honorius III		
Guido Pierleoni	Bishop of Palestrina	18 December 1204	Innocent III	Archpriest of the Vatican Basilica	
Guala Bicchieri, C.R.S.P.	Priest of SS. Silvestro e Martino ai Monti	18 December 1204	Innocent III	Protopriest	
Stefano di Ceccano, O.Cist.	Priest of SS. XII Apostoli	19 May 1212	Innocent III		
Tommaso da Capua	Priest of S. Sabina	5 March 1216	Innocent III	Grand penitentiary	
Ottaviano dei Conti di Segni	Deacon of SS. Sergio e Bacco	27 May 1206	Innocent III	Protodeacon	Cardinal-nephew
Rainiero Capocci, O.Cist.	Deacon of S. Maria in Cosmedin	5 March 1216	Innocent III		
Stefano de Normandis dei Conti	Deacon of S. Adriano	5 March 1216	Innocent III		Cardinal-nephew
Gregorio Crescenzi	Deacon of S. Teodoro	5 March 1216	Innocent III		
Gil Torres	Deacon of SS. Cosma e Damiano	18 February 1217	Honorius III		
Pietro Caputo	Deacon of S. Giorgio in Velabro	1219	Honorius III		

== Absentee cardinal ==
Probably three cardinals were absent:

Elector	Cardinalatial title	Elevated	Elevator	Notes
Stephen Langton	S.R.E. cardinalis	27 May 1206	Innocent III	Archbishop of Canterbury 1207–1228; resigned his titulus S. Crisogono after receiving episcopal consecration in 1207; external cardinal
Giovanni Colonna di Carbognano	Priest of S. Prassede	27 May 1206	Innocent III	Rector of Spoleto
Romano Bonaventura	Deacon of S. Maria in Portico	5 March 1216	Innocent III	Papal Legate in the southern France

== Sources ==
- Konrad Eubel, Hierarchia Catholica Medii Aevi, volumen I, 1913
- F. Bourkle-Young: notes to the papal election of 1227
- Vatican history
- The Catholic Encyclopedia: Pope Gregory IX
- Werner Maleczek, Papst und Kardinalskolleg von 1191 bis 1216, Wien 1984
- Timo Bandhold, Die Wahl Papst Gregors IX., 2007, ISBN 3-638-81022-4
- Gaetano Moroni, Dizionario di erudizione storico-ecclesiastica da S. Pietro sino ai nostri giorni Vol. XXXII and vol. LXXXV, Tipografia Emiliana, Venezia, 1840 - 1861
