= Conti di Segni =

Italian noble family

Coat of arms of the Conti di Segni. Gules, an eagle chequy sable and or membered or (from the 14th century, the eagle is often shown crowned or).

The Conti di Segni (Latin: de Comitibus Signie, also known as Conti or De Comitibus for short) were an important noble family of medieval and early modern Italy originating in Segni, Lazio. Many members of the family acted as military commanders or ecclesiastical dignitaries, including many cardinals and four popes.

The family is on historical record beginning with Trasimondo, the father of Lotario Conti, who became Pope Innocent III in 1198. The second Conti pope was Ugolino (1227-1241), as Gregory IX, the third Rinaldo, as Alexander IV (r. 1254-1261). Bishop Paul of Tripoli (1261–1285) was a Conti and his sister Lucienne was the princess of Antioch. Medieval to Renaissance era cardinals of the family include Giovanni dei Conti di Segni, Niccolò dei Conti di Segni, Ottaviano di Paoli, Giovanni Conti (d. 1493) and Francesco Conti (d. 1521). In medieval Rome, both the Torre dei Conti (built in 1238) and the Torre delle Milizie, testified to the feudal power of the family.

In the early modern period, Michelangelo Conti reigned as Pope Innocent XIII from 1721 to 1724. Torquato Conti (1591–1636) served as a general-field marshal of the Holy Roman Empire during the Thirty Years' War, where his cruelty earned him the nickname The Devil.

The family became divided into numerous branches, the principal of which were the counts of Segni and Valmontone, and the dukes of Poli and Guadagnolo (cf. House of Torlonia). The former branch was extinct with Donna Fulvia (died 1611), who had married the count Sforza of Santa Fiora.

== See also ==
- House of Visconti
- Visconti (disambiguation)
