= 1216 papal election =

Election of Catholic Pope Honorius III

Papal election 1216

Dates and location
- 18 July 1216; Perugia

Key officials
- Dean: Nicola de Romanis
- Camerlengo: Stefano di Ceccano
- Protopriest: Cinzio Cenci
- Protodeacon: Guido Pierleone

Elected pope
- Cencio Savelli; Name taken: Honorius III
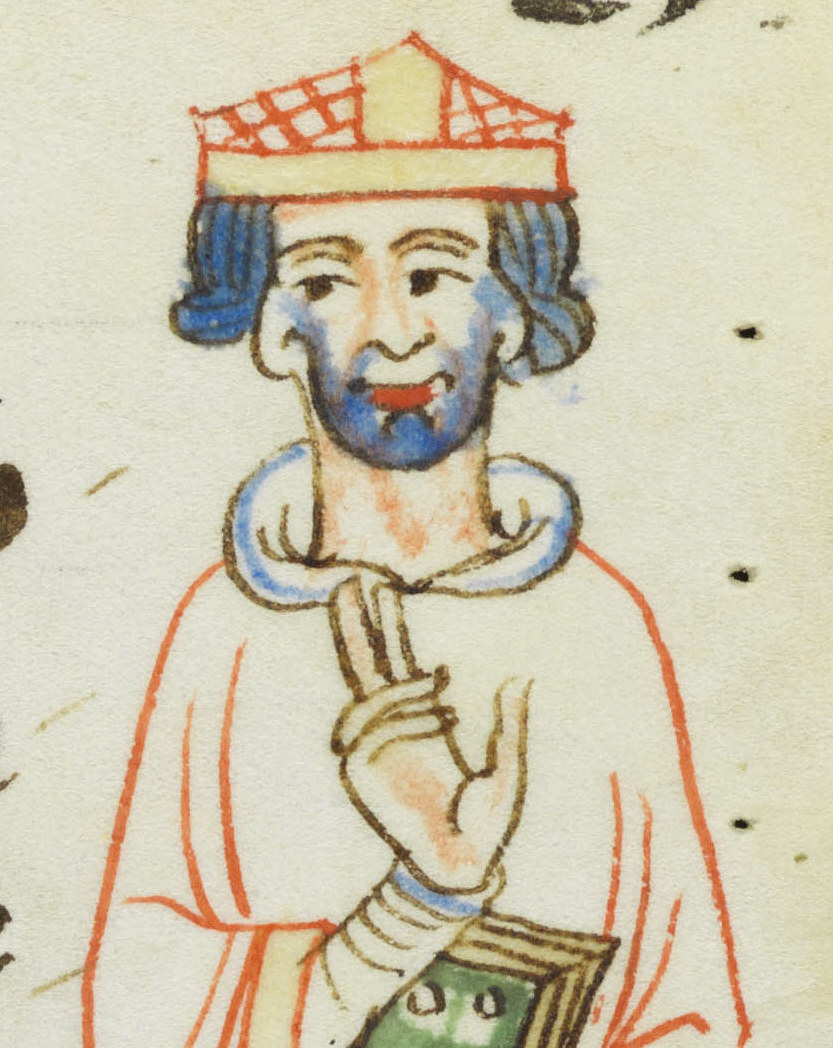

The 1216 papal election was convoked in Perugia on 18 July 1216 following the death of Pope Innocent III two days earlier. The troubled social and political climate in Italy, including the threat of schism and foreign invasions, led the assembled cardinals to adopt the procedure of compromissum, delegating the election to a committee of cardinal-bishops.

The committee, which included Ugolino di Segni (later Pope Gregory IX) and Guido Papareschi, elected Cencio Savelli, aged 68, who took the name Honorius III. Honorius III was both a Roman native and renowned for his diplomatic skills, which would prove essential for navigating the papacy through contemporary challenges such as the Fifth Crusade and ongoing disputes with secular powers.

Seventeen cardinals participated in the election, while eight were absent, including several notable legates active in European affairs. The swift and nearly unanimous outcome of the election was achieved amid uncertainty regarding external pressures and the need for unity during a critical period of Church history.

== List of participants ==
There were 25 cardinals in the College of Cardinals in July 1216, including 23 curial cardinals and two "external cardinals", who did not reside in the papal curia It is known that 17 of them participated in the election:

Elector	Title	Elevated	Elevator	Other ecclesiastical titles	Notes
Nicola de Romanis	Bishop of Frascati	18 December 1204	Innocent III	Dean of the Sacred College of Cardinals	
Ugolino di Segni	Bishop of Ostia e Velletri	19 December 1198	Innocent III		Committee member; cardinal-nephew; future Pope Gregory IX
Guido Papareschi	Bishop of Palestrina	22 September 1190	Clement III		Committee member
Pelagio Galvani	Bishop of Albano	ca. 1206/1207	Innocent III		
Cinzio Cenci	Priest of S. Lorenzo in Lucina	22 September 1190	Clement III	Protopriest	
Cencio	Priest of SS. Giovanni e Paolo	20 February 1193	Celestine III	Camerlengo of the Sacred College of Cardinals	Elected Pope Honorius III; possibly of Savelli family
Giovanni Colonna di Carbognano	Deacon of SS. Cosma e Damiano	27 May 1206	Innocent III		
Gregorio Gualgano	Priest of S. Anastasia	27 May 1206	Innocent III		
Robert of Courson	Priest of S. Stefano al Monte Celio	19 May 1212	Innocent III		
Peter of Benevento	Priest of S. Lorenzo in Damaso	19 May 1212	Innocent III		His name is often erroneously listed as Pierre Duacensis
Stefano di Ceccano, O.Cist.	Priest of SS. XII Apostoli	13 April 1213	Innocent III	Camerlengo of the Holy Roman Church	
Tommaso da Capua	Priest of S. Sabina	5 March 1216	Innocent III	Vice-Chancellor of the Holy Roman Church	
Guido Pierleone	Deacon of S. Nicola in Carcere Tulliano	18 December 1204	Innocent III	Protodeacon; Archpriest of the patriarchal Vatican Basilica	
Ottaviano dei conti di Segni	Deacon of SS. Sergio e Bacco	27 May 1206	Innocent III		Cardinal-nephew
Gregorio Crescenzi	Deacon of S. Teodoro	5 March 1216	Innocent III		
Romano Bonaventura	Deacon of S. Maria in Portico	5 March 1216	Innocent III		
Stefano de Normandis dei Conti	Deacon of S. Adriano	5 March 1216	Innocent III		Cardinal-nephew

== Absentee cardinals ==
Eight cardinals, including six curial and two "external cardinals", were absent:

Elector	Cardinalatial title	Elevated	Elevator	Notes
Benedetto	Bishop of Porto e Santa Rufina	3 June 1200	Innocent III	
Ruggiero di San Severino	Cardinal Priest of S. Eusebio	ca. 1178/80	Alexander III	Archbishop of Benevento 1179-1221 ("external" cardinal)
Leone Brancaleone, C.R.S.F.	Priest of S. Croce in Gerusalemme	3 June 1200	Innocent III	Papal legate in Lombardy
Guala Bicchieri	Priest of SS. Silvestro e Martino ai Monti	18 December 1204	Innocent III	Papal legate in England
Stephen Langton	S.R.E. cardinalis	27 May 1206	Innocent III	Archbishop of Canterbury 1207-1228; resigned this titulus S,. Crisogono after episcopal consecration in 1207; "external" cardinal
Pietro Sasso	Priest of S. Pudenziana	27 May 1206	Innocent III	Archpriest of the patriarchal Liberian Basilica; papal legate in Germany
Bertrannus	Deacon of S. Giorgio in Velabro	19 May 1212	Innocent III	
Rainiero Capocci, O.Cist.	Deacon of S. Maria in Cosmedin	5 March 1216	Innocent III	Papal legate in Lombardy

== Election of Pope Honorius III ==
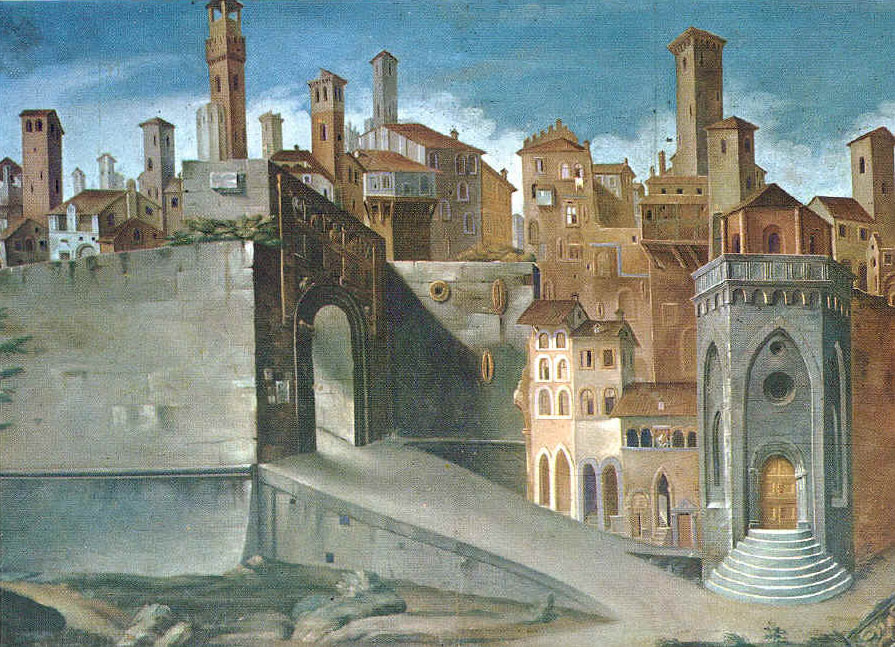
Perugia cityscape (15th century)

The cardinals assembled in Perugia two days after the death of Innocent III. They deliberated in the enclosure, though it is not certain whether voluntarily or under pressure of the local authorities. They decided to elect the new Pope by compromissum, it means, not by the whole Sacred College, but by the committee of few of them, empowered by the rest to appoint the new Pontiff. This time the committee included only two cardinal-bishops: Ugolino of Ostia and Guido of Palestrina. On that same day, they elected Cardinal Cencio, called Camerario, aged 68, who accepted his election and took the name of Honorius III.

== Sources ==
- Werner Maleczek, Papst und Kardinalskolleg von 1191 bis 1216, Wien 1984
- Konrad Eubel, Hierarchia Catholica Medii Aevi, volumen I, 1913
- F. Bourkle-Young: notes to the papal election of 1216
- Vatican history
