= Giacomo Conti =

Giacomo Conti may refer to:

- Giacomo Conti (artist) (1813–1888), Italian painter
- Giacomo Conti (bobsledder) (1918–1992), Italian bobsledder
- Giacomo Conti (footballer) (born 1999), Sammarinese footballer
