= 1953 in Italian television =

This is a list of Italian television related events from 1953.

== Events ==
In 1953, the experimental phase of Italian television is almost over. During the year, the two repeaters in Milan and Turin are joined by five more ones covering most of Northern and Central Italy. Even before its official launch, however, RAI television comes under harsh criticism from the press, especially for the low quality of the shows and its state monopoly regime.

- 9 March: The Italian news program has its first mishap. For Stalin's funeral, it broadcasts archive footage of a burial on Red Square, where the Soviet dictator appears alive and recognizable.
- 2 June: The news program redeems itself by airing the images of the coronation of Elizabeth II.
- September: After a break for the summer, television broadcasts restart and become daily. Half the schedule is composed of movies.
- 3 October : Beginning of television broadcasting in Rome (20 September in Genoa).
- 11 October First issue of La domenica sportiva. (see below) Three reports are broadcast, about :
  - the football (soccer) match Inter-Fiorentina for the Serie A 1953-1954, won by Inter 2-1;
  - a 50 kilometres race walk in Abbiategrasso won by Giuseppe Dordoni (the athlete is also the first guest in studio of the show);
  - Tre Valli Varesine cycling race, won by Nino Defilippis
- 22 October The 24 years old Nicoletta Orsomando debuts on RAI, introducing a documentary for children; she will be, for forty years, the most famous and popular of RAI’s “signorina buonasera” (female in-vision continuity announcer).
- 19 November: The television license fee is instituted.
- 13 December: For the first time, Italian television airs an international football match (Italy- Czechoslovakia, from Stadio Luigi Ferraris in Genoa), with Carlo Bacarelli as commentator, sided by Vittorio Veltroni and Nicolò Carosio.

== Debuts ==
- La domenica sportiva (The sporty Sunday), the longest-lasting show of the Italian television, which is still aired.
- Festival della nuova canzone siciliana (Festival of the new Sicilian Song), 5 seasons, hosted by Corrado Mantoni, in his debut on television.

== Television shows ==
- Album personale di Wanda Osiris (Wanda Osiris’ personal album) – tribute to the most popular Italian showgirl of her generation, directed by Daniele D’Anza.
- Avventure nell’arte (Adventure in arts) – care of Antonio Morassi, first Italian educational program.
- Il commesso di libreria (The bookshop’s clerk) – by Franco Antonicelli, first cultural magazine.
- Arrivi e partenze (Arrivals and departures) – gossip magazine with interviews, in ports and airports, to celebrities coming in or leaving Italy. It was the television debut of the director Antonello Falqui and of the presenter Mike Bongiorno, who is sided by Armando Pizzo.
