= 1939 in Italian television =

This is a list of Italian television related events from 1939

== Events ==
- 2 June: In Milan, at the Leonardo Exhibition of Inventions, the SAFAR Company presents to the authorities (including Vittorio Mussolini) the first Italian experiment of TV broadcasting. Two days later, the SAFAR TV pavilion is inaugurated by Achille Starace and opened to the public.
- 22 July: first regular telecasts in Rome, by the EIAR. The shows are broadcast, twice daily (from 18 to 18.45 and from 21 to 21.45), from an antenna on Monte Mario to the TV pavilion in the Beach Village at the Circus Maximus. The actress Lidia Pasqualini is the first announcer.
- 16 September : fist sport program. The journalists Nicolò Carosio and Vittorio Veltroni interview the Bologna football players, in Rome for a Serie A match.
- 20 September: for the eleventh Radio Exposition in Milan, EIAR makes experimental telecasts from the Littoria Tower in the Northern Park. Some of the most famous Italian singers of the time, as Alberto Rabagliati and the Trio Lescano, perform for the first time on the little screen.
- 31 October: Benito Mussolini sees, for the first time, a TV show in his Villa Torlonia residence; some weeks later, he gets an “autarkic” TV set as a gift by the SAFAR Company. Beyond the Duce’s one, there are in Rome just other two televisions able to pick up the EIAR broadcasts: one is in the Ministry of Interior and the second one is in the SAFAR shop, in Santi Apostoli Square, where people line up to glance the new media.
- A Thousand Lire a Month by Max Neufeld is the first Italian film about television (also if the story is set on Hungary), and one of the first ever in the world.
