= San Giorgio in Strata =

Church in Vigevano, Italy

Coordinates: 45°18′55″N 8°51′33″E

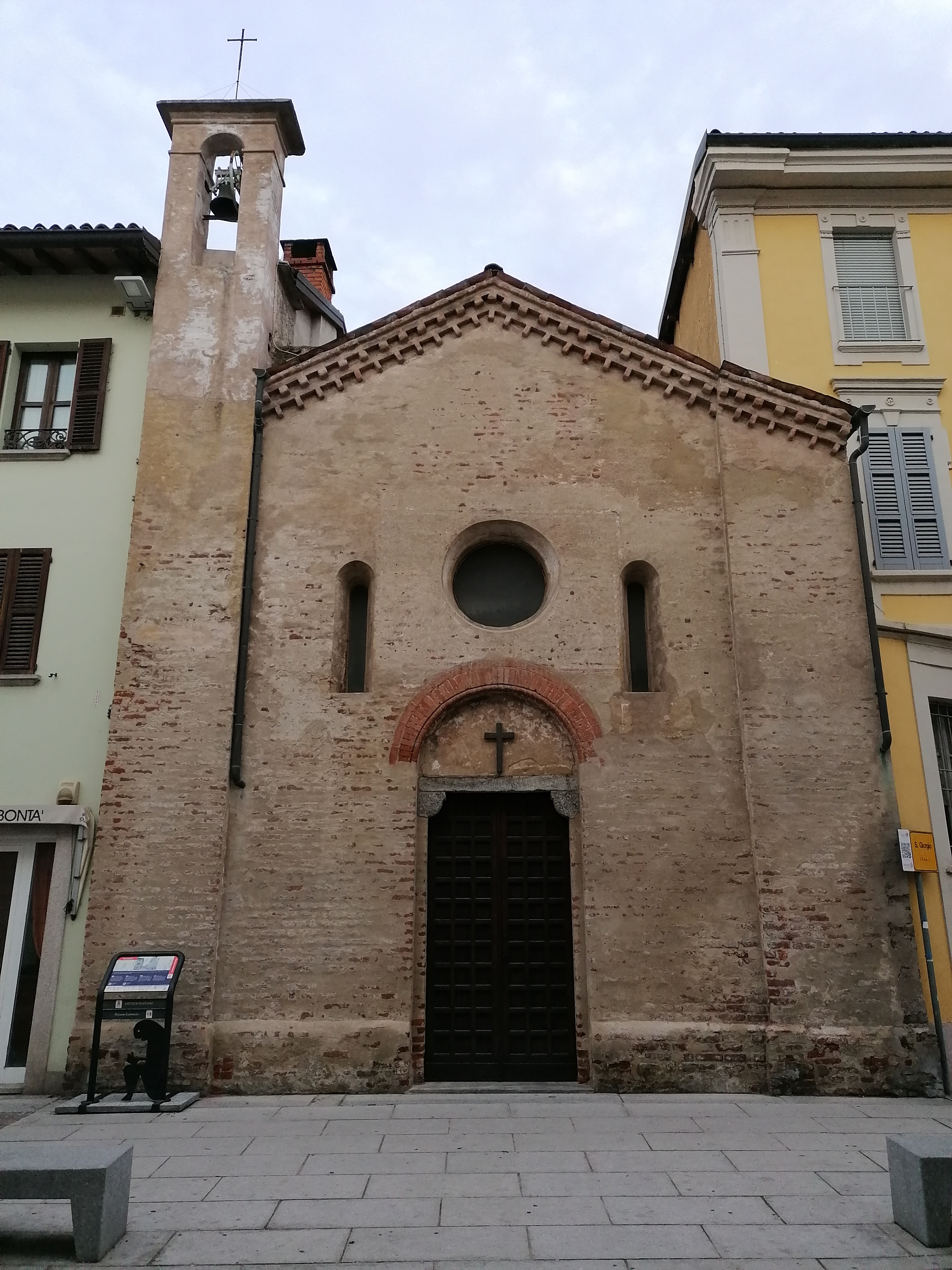
The church

The Church of San Giorgio in Strata is a religious building located in Vigevano, in province of Pavia and diocese of Vigevano, Italy.

== History ==
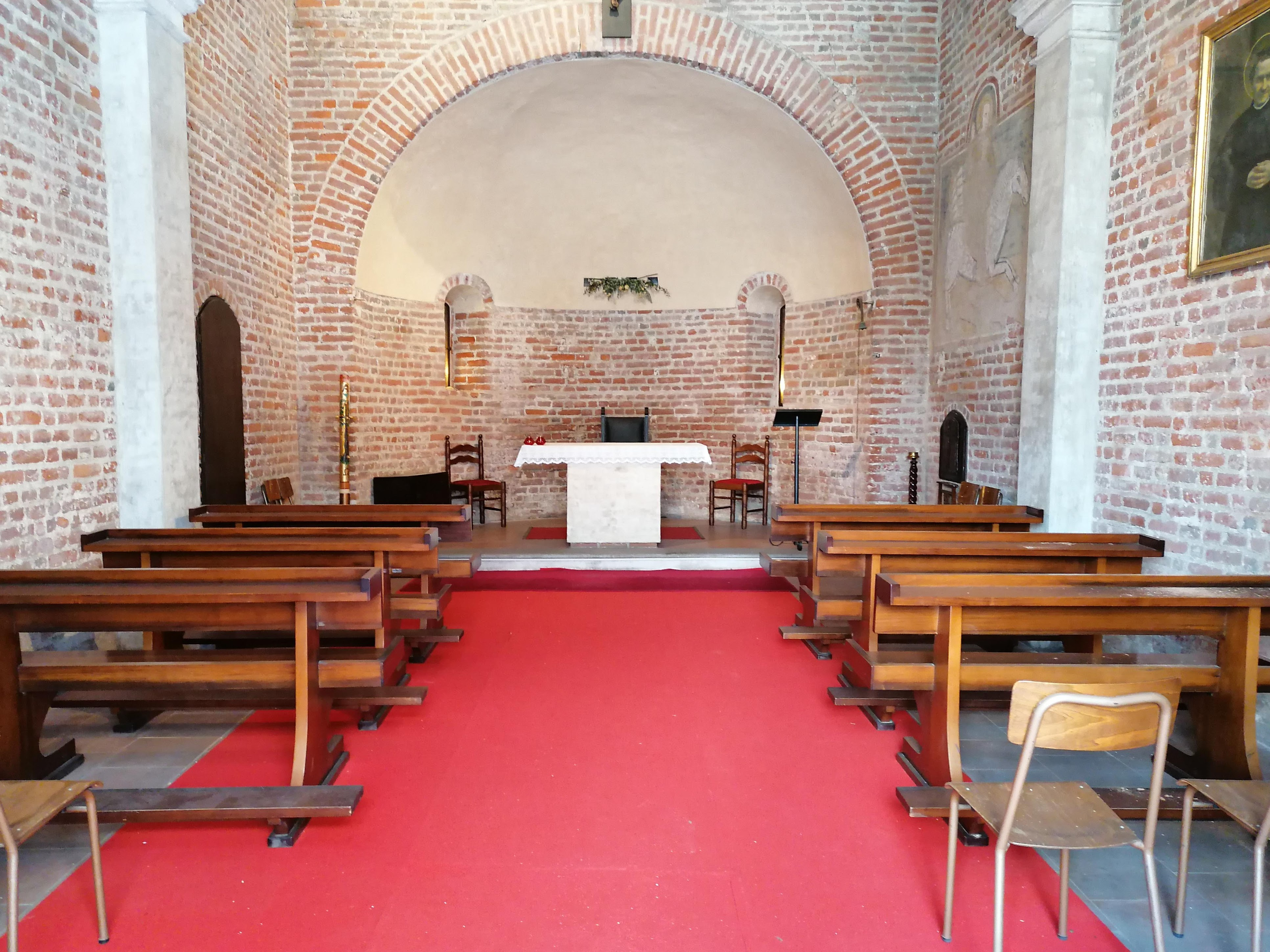
The interior

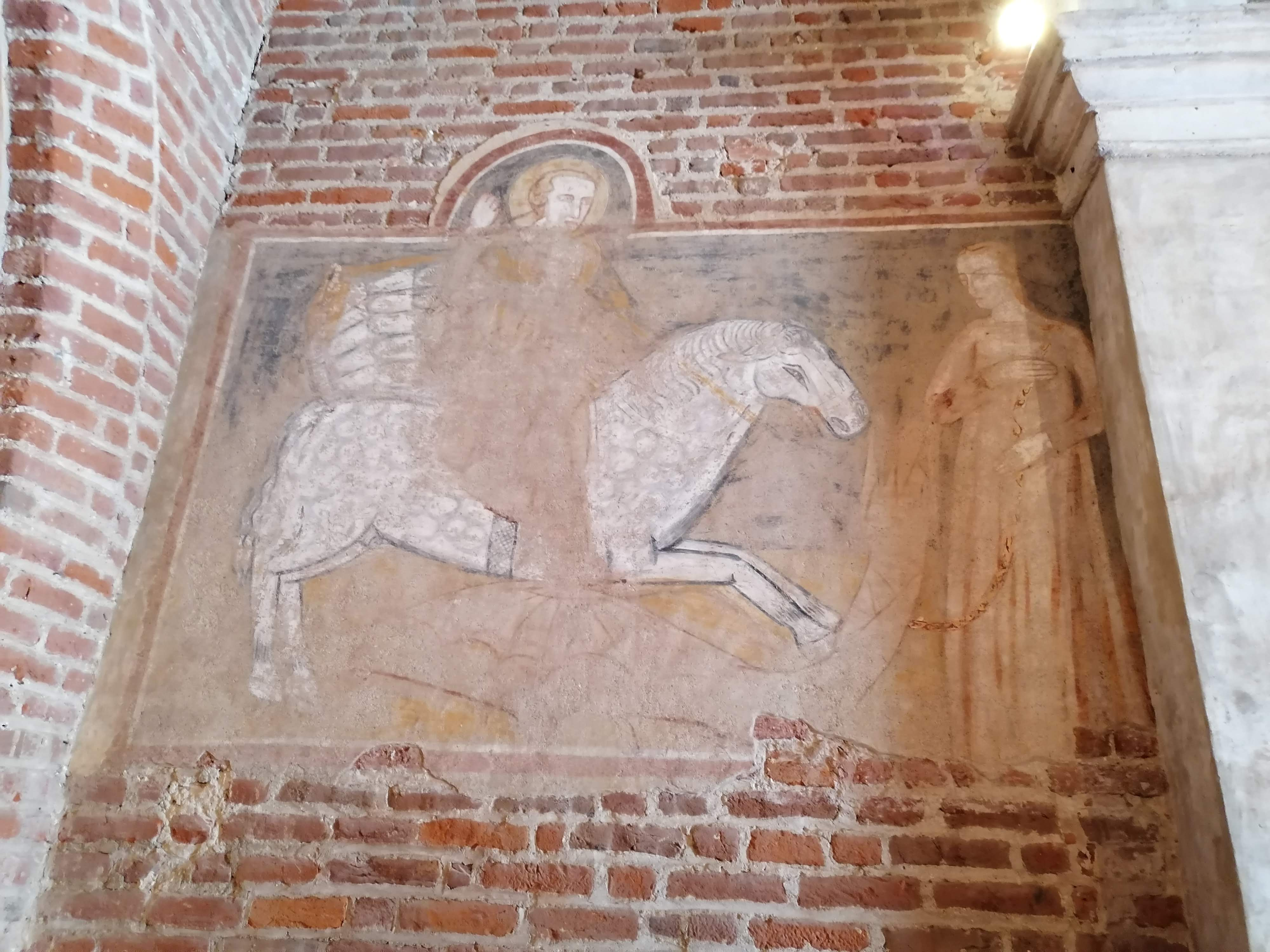
The fresco of Saint George

The church was complementary to the adjacent Visconti Castle. It was built under the patronage of the Colli family.

It is located in via Cairoli, once via Strata, from which it takes its name. Almost suffocated by houses, it risks going unnoticed by the people of Vigevano themselves. In the 1980s, it was considered the oldest city church open for worship: in fact, the first news about it dates back to 1090; it then underwent numerous restorations, the last of which in 1968 by the architect Mario Bonzanini. According to other sources, the church dates back to the primitive Lombard age.

According to a legend, the church of San Giorgio was originally not located in its current location, but inside Castello Sforzesco, so that the knights of Vigevano could go there to pray. During his stay in the city, it is said that Ludovico il Moro fell in love with a lady-in-waiting of his wife Beatrice, a young and beautiful girl who, however, did not reciprocate this feeling, preferring a squire to him. The girl and the squire then got married secretly inside the church, making an agreement with a friar, so that Ludovico wouldn't know anything about it, then they left on horseback towards Novara. However, Ludovico learned of the fact and began chasing them for over two hundred kilometers. Having surrendered, he then returned to the castle of Vigevano, beheading the friar and ordering the destruction of the chapel. The knights then decided to rebuild it, brick by brick, outside the city walls, in its current location. The reality of the facts, however, was that the church was "moved", dismantling it and reassembling it in the current Via Cairoli, as in its previous position it would have prevented the changes to the castle requested by Ludovico Sforza in those years.

Carlo Stefano Brambilla wrote in this regard: "The Chancellor Simone Del Pozzo says that the Church of San Giorgio was formerly in the Castle, but that it was destroyed by order of the Duke Galeazzo Maria Sforza, and that this one was built in its place, which is currently located in Porta di Strata, called Porta Sforzesca. He does not mention the time it was built, but from the building itself it can be recognized as being very ancient. The owners say the year 1090. Mention is made of this church in the book of the Estimo of the Clergy of Novara and its Diocese made in the year 1324 with these words: Ecclesia Sancti Georgii de Viglevano pro una praebenda, as I have seen by an authentic faith of 29 October 1427". Dal Pozzo always considered the castle to be the only part located in the center of the village, while long before him the castle was understood as the village which contained the fortress in its middle and in the highest part.

San Giorgio is particularly dear to the people of Vigevano, especially the students, who for generations have gone there for their "propitiatory" devotions, before entering the nearby high school.

The church is privately owned. It is currently managed by the local Ecuadorian community of the Virgin of Cisne.

== Description ==
=== External ===
The façade, a cusp in lime-filled bricks, without plaster, is limited by pilasters at the ends. The bell tower, built on the left pilaster, was originally lower than the level of the other pilaster. There are three windows, one circular and two single-lancet windows, arched and slender on the inside and outside, respecting the early Christian tradition which wanted to make the environment suitable for prayer. The small door, surmounted by a blind lunette, was made by Luigi Barni in 1927 in oak wood from Slavonia.

=== Internal ===
The binnacle, with a single nave with a rectangular plan and a semicircular apse, is divided into three bays of arches supported by pilasters, added in the eighteenth century. The interior was heavily remodeled in the eighteenth century, with numerous modifications and additions largely demolished in the restoration works of 1968. Among the works that disappeared or demolished in those years, noteworthy are the altarpiece depicting the martyrdom of Saint George and Empress Alexandra and the stepped altar, replaced by a more modern one.

The ceiling is made of wooden boards, replacing the original wooden one. The pilasters, eighteenth-century works that survived the works of 1968, act as support for the arches, from the same period, which replaced the previous wooden trusses to give greater solidity to the church. These are three-centred arches, on which the wooden beams they replaced and some floral motifs were probably once represented, covered by a patina of white tempera.

The apse is semicircular covered by a basin vault. There are ancient openings which were then walled up, which were once used to give light to the interior of the building. With the works of the eighteenth century, in which the floor was raised up to the first pilaster, the apse also took on the functions of choir and sacristy, returning to its original function only with the works of 1968, when the baroque altar was removed and a new one was built in that year.

The only surviving painting is the fresco depicting Saint George attacking and killing a dragon, only sketched, with a long pole, in front of a princess. The painting, the work of a local school painter, originally presented the figure of the saint proportionate to that of the horse; with the eighteenth-century intervention, the saint was re-proportioned based on the figure of the princess, however resulting disproportionate to the horse. The fresco, of uncertain date (13th-15th century), was restored for the last time in 1969 following the directions of the prof. Vicentini. Inside the church there was also a Saint Ambrose, later transferred to Palazzo Vescovile.
