= Stefano de Normandis dei Conti =

Italian cardinal

Stefano de Normandis dei Conti (Rome or Perugia, circa 1190 – Naples, 8 December 1254) was an Italian cardinal. He was a nephew of Pope Innocent III.

== Biography ==
Belonging to a family of ancient nobility, he dedicated himself to an ecclesiastical career after the death of his wife, having already had a son Filippo who joined the Franciscan Order. In 1216 Stefano was appointed cardinal deacon of Sant'Adriano al Foro by Pope Innocent III, of whom he was a nephew. In 1228 he was translated to the title of cardinal priest of Santa Maria in Trastevere and in 1231 he was appointed Archpriest of the Vatican Basilica. He also received prebends of Lyme & Halstock (Salisbury), Lincoln, and York. After Pope Innocent IV had fled Rome for Lyon during his confrontation with Emperor Frederick II, Conti became Cardinal Vicar of Rome from 1244 to 1251. In 1245 he became the Protopriest of the College of Cardinals. At the request of the pope, he reduced the number of canonics from 36 to 25 and reformed the chapter of the Lateran Basilica. Conti served as papal legate in the Kingdom of Sicily where he pronounced papal deposition of Frederick. He then served as governor of the provinces of Sabina and Campagna e Marittima of the Papal States. He built and decorated the chapel of St. Sylvester at the church of Santi Quattro Coronati. He died in Naples on 8 December 1254, the last of the cardinals of Innocent III, and was buried in the city's cathedral.

== Conclaves ==
During his cardinalate, Stefano de Normandis dei Conti participated in the following papal elections:

- conclave of 1216, which elected Pope Honorius III
- conclave of 1227, which elected Pope Gregory IX
- conclave of 1241, which elected Pope Celestine IV
- conclave of 1243, which elected Pope Innocent IV

== Sources ==
- Werner Maleczek, CONTI, Stefano, in Dizionario Biografico degli Italiani, vol. 28, Istituto dell'Enciclopedia Italiana, 1983.
- Salvador Miranda, NORMANDIS DEI CONTI, Stefano de, on fiu.edu – The Cardinals of the Holy Roman Church, Florida International University.

Catholic Church titles
Preceded by Angelo	Cardinal deacon of Sant'Adriano al Foro; 5 March 1216–1 October 1228	Succeeded by Goffredo da Trani
Preceded by Guido Papareschi	Cardinal priest of Santa Maria in Trastevere; 1 October 1228–8 December 1254	Succeeded by Matteo Rubeo Orsini
Preceded by Guido Pierleone	Archpriest of St. Peter's Basilica in the Vatican; 1231–8 December 1254	Succeeded by Riccardo Annibaldi
Preceded by James of Pecorara	Vicar general of His Holiness for the Diocese of Rome; 25 June 1244–1251	Succeeded by Riccardo Annibaldi
Preceded by Giovanni Colonna	Protopriest of the College of Cardinals; 28 January 1245–8 December 1254	Succeeded by John of Toledo, O.Cist.
