= Conrad of Urach =

Cistercian monk and abbot

Conrad of Urach (also named Conrad von Urach; German: Konrad von Urach, also known as Konrad or Kuno von Zähringen; born in the 1170s; died 29 September 1227, probably in Bari) was a Cistercian monk and abbot, and Cardinal Bishop of Porto and Santa Rufina; he declined the papacy.

== Infancy ==
Conrad was the second son of Count Egino IV of Urach and his wife Agnes, sister of Berthold V of Zähringen, in the early generations of the line of Dukes of Württemberg. His early education was entrusted to his great-uncle Rudolf of Zähringen, Bishop of Liège. At an early age he became a canon of St. Lambert's Cathedral in Liège. His parents married in 1181, and so it is thought his birthdate was around 1185. This makes his ecclesiastical career, starting as an oblate, coherent with the normal career of a secular child, who would have entered into a squireship at around the same age he seems to have entered the Church in Liège, putatively around 1196.

== Becoming a cleric ==
In 1199 however he entered the Cistercian monastery of Villers in Brabant, whose abbot was another uncle. He soon became prior, and in 1209 abbot. In 1214 he was chosen abbot of Clairvaux, and, in 1217, abbot of Cîteaux and general of his order, in succession to Arnaud Amaury, the first Legate of the Albigensian Crusade.

== Missions as prelate ==
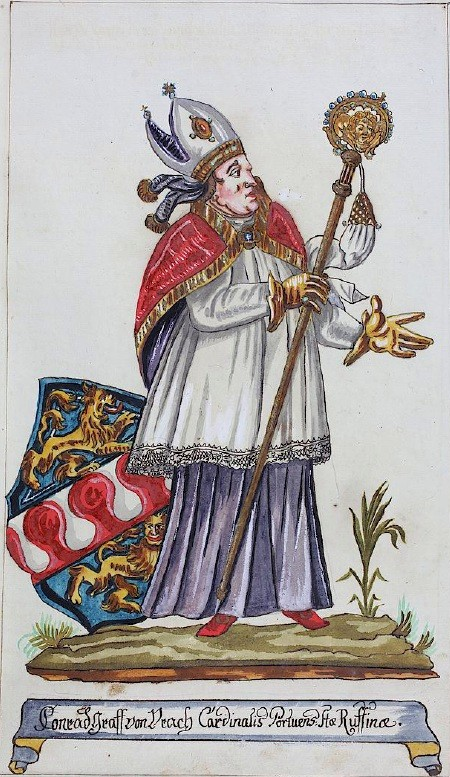
Cardinal Bishop Konrad von Urach

While he was in Rome on the business of the order, Pope Honorius III created him cardinal, on 8 January 1219, and later charged him as Papal legate with two important missions: one in France (1220–23), to suppress the Albigenses; the other in Germany (1224–26), to promote the crusade which Emperor Frederick II had vowed to undertake (the eventual Sixth Crusade).

Conrad's success in both these missions was modest, but he was more successful in the improvement of ecclesiastical and monastic discipline through the arrangement of synods and the foundation of monasteries, as well as in the advancement of the Dominicans - their foundation-house in Toulouse (1214) was ideally placed as an anvil for his function as third Legate to the Albigensian crusade. During this period he also issued statutes to the medical faculty at the University of Montpellier (1220).

While in Germany, Conrad was responsible for the declaration as a martyr of Engelbert II of Berg, Archbishop of Cologne, murdered on 7 November 1225. His pressure on the Holy Roman Emperor was aimed at containing Frederic II's increasing moslimisation as well as defending the interests of the Southern German nobility, of which he was a member.

== Electing the pope ==
He returned to Rome in 1226, undertaking negotiations with the cities of the Lombard League. After the death of Honorius III on 18 March 1227 he was appointed a member of a triumvirate of cardinals chosen to select the new pope the next day, and as a matter of courtesy was offered the papacy, which he refused out of concern he would be accused of self-aggrandisement. He died at Bari later that year and was buried, according to his own wishes, in the abbey at Clairvaux.

Cistercian records refer to him as Blessed (liturgical feast on 30 September) but there is little if any evidence of a cult.

== See also ==
- Papal election, 1227

== Sources ==
- Johannes Madey (1992). "Konrad von Urach". In Bautz, Traugott (ed.). Biographisch-Bibliographisches Kirchenlexikon (BBKL) (in German). Vol. 4. Herzberg: Bautz. cols. 440–441. ISBN 3-88309-038-7.
- (in German) Neininger, Falko, 1994. Konrad Von Urach (1227): Zahringer, Zizterzienser, Kardinallegat. Paderborn.
