= Giovanni Conti =

Giovanni Conti may refer to:

- Giovanni Conti (died 1332), Dominican archbishop of Pisa and Nicosia
- Giovanni Conti (cardinal) (1414–1493), Italian Roman Catholic bishop and cardinal
- Giovanni Maria Conti (1617–1670), Italian painter
- Giovanni Conti (painter) (died 1909), Italian painter
- Giovanni Conti (politician) (1882–1957), Italian politician
- Giovanni Conti (windsurfer) (born 1960), Sammarinese windsurfer
