= Francesco Conti =

Francesco Conti may refer to:

- Francesco Conti (bishop) (died 1521), Italian Roman Catholic bishop and cardinal
- Francesco Bartolomeo Conti (1681/2–1732), Italian composer and musician
- Francesco Conti (painter) (1681–1760), Italian artist
- Francesco Conti (footballer) (born 1962), Italian retired footballer and manager
