= Segni (surname) =

Segni is an Italian surname. Notable people with the name include:

- Antonio Segni (1891–1972), Italian politician, prime minister and fourth president of the Italian Republic
- Giulio Segni(1498-1561), Italian composer
- Mario Segni (born 1939), Italian politician and son of Antonio Segni

== See also ==
- Segni (disambiguation)
