= Andrea Conti =

Andrea Conti may refer to:

- Andrea Conti (footballer, born 1994), Italian football defender for AC Milan
- Andrea Conti (footballer, born 1977), Italian football forward for AC Bellinzona
- Andrea Conti (basketball) (born 1974), Italian basketball player
