= Andrea dei Conti =

Italian Catholic Theologian

Blessed Andrea dei Conti OFM
- Born: 1240; Anagni, Papal States
- Died: 1 February 1302 (aged 62); Mount Scalambra, Piglio, Papal States
- Venerated in: Roman Catholic Church
- Beatified: 11 December 1723, Saint Peter's Basilica by Pope Innocent XIII
- Feast: 1 February, 3 February (Franciscans
- Attributes: Franciscan habit, purple stole

Andrea dei Conti (1240 – 1 February 1302) was an Italian Franciscan who was born as a member of the noble house of Conti di Segni.

The priest was best known for his humble life of solitude in which he was subjected to demonic visions and attacks though his faith in God saw him emerge time and time again as the victor. He lived his life in a small grotto in the Apennines.

Conti was the paternal nephew of Pope Alexander IV and is reported to be the maternal uncle or cousin - though related in some form - of Pope Boniface VIII in addition to being both the ancestor of Pope Innocent XIII and medieval pontiffs Pope Innocent III and Pope Gregory IX; he was also related to a total of five Italian cardinals from his noble stock. His descendant Innocent XIII approved the Franciscan's beatification on 11 December 1724.

== Life ==
Andrea dei Conti was born into the noble house of Conti di Segni in 1240 in Anagni to Stefano - the brother of Pope Alexander IV. His sister was the mother of Pope Boniface VIII or he and his sister were the future pontiff's cousins.

In his adolescence he saw around him the world and its vainness and decided to live a life opposite to it in order to pursue the religious life. He renounced his wealth and left his father's castle where he sought refuge at the San Lorenzo convent in the mountains in the Lazio region. Conti became a hermit living in the Apennines and had routine visits and attacks from demons in a series of visions in which his ardent faith in God saw him emerge as the victor time and time again. It was in the mountains that he found a grotto and with the permission of his superiors made his abode there; the cavern he lived in was so narrow and low that he had to kneel or bend over when inside due to his tall height. Pope Boniface VIII wanted to elevate his relation to the rank of cardinal in one of the two consistories of 1295 but he declined the offer in order to cite being inadequate for the position and citing his love for solitude and the contemplative life. This meekness left such a profound impact on the pope who expressed his desire to outlive the Franciscan so that he could canonize him as a saint. It also seemed that his example of refusal was one of the reasons that Boniface VIII decided to convoke the 1300 Jubilee Year.

Conti was diligent in his contemplation of spiritual matters and dedicated himself to self-education of the sacred sciences while also being the author of a treatise on the veneration of the Madonna that his contemporaries treasured - the text no longer exist. On one occasion he was far too ill to eat and so a friend bought him a plate of roasted birds to assuage his illness; Conti was too distressed to see the slain birds that he made the sign of the Cross over them and - it has been said - bought them back to life.

He died in 1302 in the Mount Scalambra hermitage he dwelled in near Piglio and his remains were interred in the church of San Lorenzo at the Mount Scalambra convent. His tomb was damaged in World War II bombings on 12 May 1944 and his remains were later reinterred in that same church on 8 February 1945 after repairs were made.

== Beatification ==
Conti was beatified on 11 December 1723 by Pope Innocent XIII, and a cause for his sainthood was opened on 12 January 1728.
