= Flora Di Conti =

Flora Di Conti (1898–1952), of Tavullia, Italy was an early direct disciple of Paramahansa Yogananda (মুকুন্দ লাল ঘোষ), the first Kriya Yoga Guru to come to the United States from India and the founder of Self-Realization Fellowship. She met Swami Yogananda in 1924 at one of his lectures in New York City, four years after he first came to America, and before he began taking what he called "Spiritual Campaigns", cross-country tours down the East Coast and then throughout the United States, to lecture on Kriya Yoga and Hindu Meditation.

As an early disciple, Flora compiled some literature on Swami Yogananda, including family background history of the Ghōṣa. Her granddaughter, Tamala Godrej, b. 1983, is now in possession of these documents.

== Quotes of prophecy ==
"You are walking on the earth as in a dream; Our world is a dream within a dream", The Divine Romance

"And I will call the moon to be my lamp", Th'y Divine Gypsy

== See also ==
- Paramahansa Yogananda
