= Visconti (disambiguation) =

Visconti is an Italian surname. It may also refer to:

- Visconti Castle (disambiguation)
- Visconti (company), Italian manufacturer of luxury goods
- Visconti Park, Lombardy, Italy
- Alfa Romeo Visconti, a 2004 concept car
