= Luigi Conti =

Luigi Conti may refer to:

- Luigi Conti (archbishop of Fermo), (1941–2021), Italian Roman Catholic prelate, Archbishop of Fermo (since 2006)
- Luigi Conti (athlete), (1937–2025), Italian long-distance runner
- Luigi Conti (nuncio), (1929–2015), Italian Roman Catholic prelate, apostolic nuncio in different countries
