= Giacomo Conti (footballer) =

Sammarinese footballer

Personal information
- Full name: Giacomo Conti
- Date of birth: 21 July 1999 (age 27)
- Place of birth: San Marino
- Position: Defender

Senior career*
Years	Team	Apps	(Gls)
–2017	San Marino Calcio		
2017–2021	Tropical Coriano		
2021–2024	San Giovanni	77	(0)

International career^{‡}
2015	San Marino U17	3	(0)
2016–2017	San Marino U19	5	(0)
2017–	San Marino U21	10	(0)
2020–2021	San Marino	5	(0)
- * Club domestic league appearances and goals as of 31 May 2025 ‡ National team caps and goals as of 17 November 2021

Giacomo Conti (born 21 July 1999) is a Sammarinese footballer who last played as a defender for San Giovanni and was capped by the San Marino national team.

== Career ==
Conti made his international debut for San Marino on 7 October 2020 in a friendly match against Slovenia, which ended in a 0–4 away loss.

== Career statistics ==
=== International ===
As of 17 November 2021

San Marino
Year	Apps	Goals
2020	1	0
2021	4	0
Total	5	0
