= The Fan (play) =

The Fan is a 1763 comedy by Carlo Goldoni. It was first produced as L´éventail in Paris at the Théâtre de la comédie italienne in May 1763, with little success. The French version is lost. Goldoni revised the play during 1764 as Il Ventaglio and it was premiered at the Teatro San Luca, Venice, in February 1765 with great success.
