= Visconti Castle (Lodi) =

- Castello Visconteo di Lodi
- Lodi
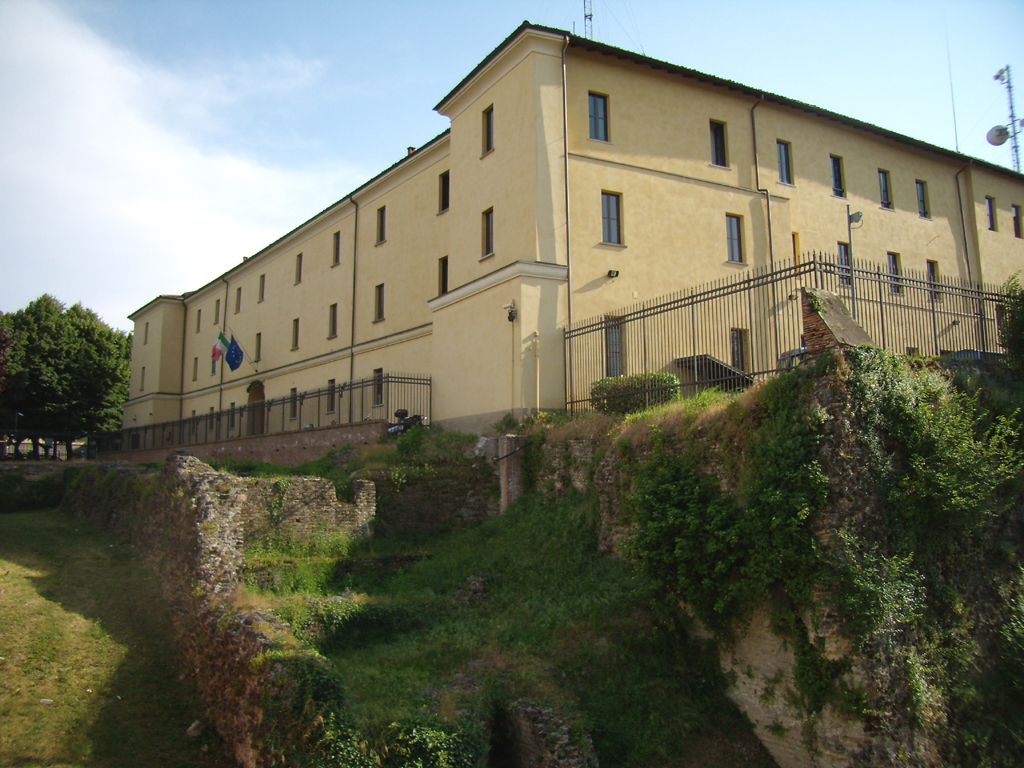
- The Visconti Castle with the remains of the ravelin

Site information
- Type: Medieval castle

Location
- Coordinates: 45°18′44″N 9°29′55″E

Site history
- Built: 12th-14th centuries
- Built by: Frederick Barbarossa, Bernabò Visconti

The Visconti Castle of Lodi is a historical building in Lodi, Lombardy, northern Italy. As it appears today, it is the result of transformations made on a Middle Age castle founded in the 12th century by Frederick Barbarossa. Its name derives from the Visconti family, lords and dukes of Milan, who in the 13th and 14th centuries took possession of and then rebuilt the original fortification.

== History ==
Lodi in the 12th century was among the Lombard cities that initially supported the emperor Frederick Barbarossa in the war engaged by him against Milan and the Lombard League. The castle was built by the emperor near the door of the city on the way to Milan, located about 30 kilometres north of Lodi. It was used by the imperial forces during the war and especially for their devastating attack to Milan in 1162.

In the first half of the 14th century the castle was acquired by members of the Visconti house during the period of their initial expansion. Later, the castle became part of the dominions of Bernabò Visconti and rebuilt by him between 1355 and 1370. In 1416 Filippo Maria Visconti reinforced the ravelin. In 1456 Francesco Sforza added a round tower to the northern corner of the castle.

At the beginning of the 20th century, the rounded tower (Torrione) was elevated to host the supply tank of the mains water. Since then, it has become a landmark of Lodi.

== Today ==
The castle today is the seat of the Questura of Lodi, the local office of the Italian Ministry of the Interior

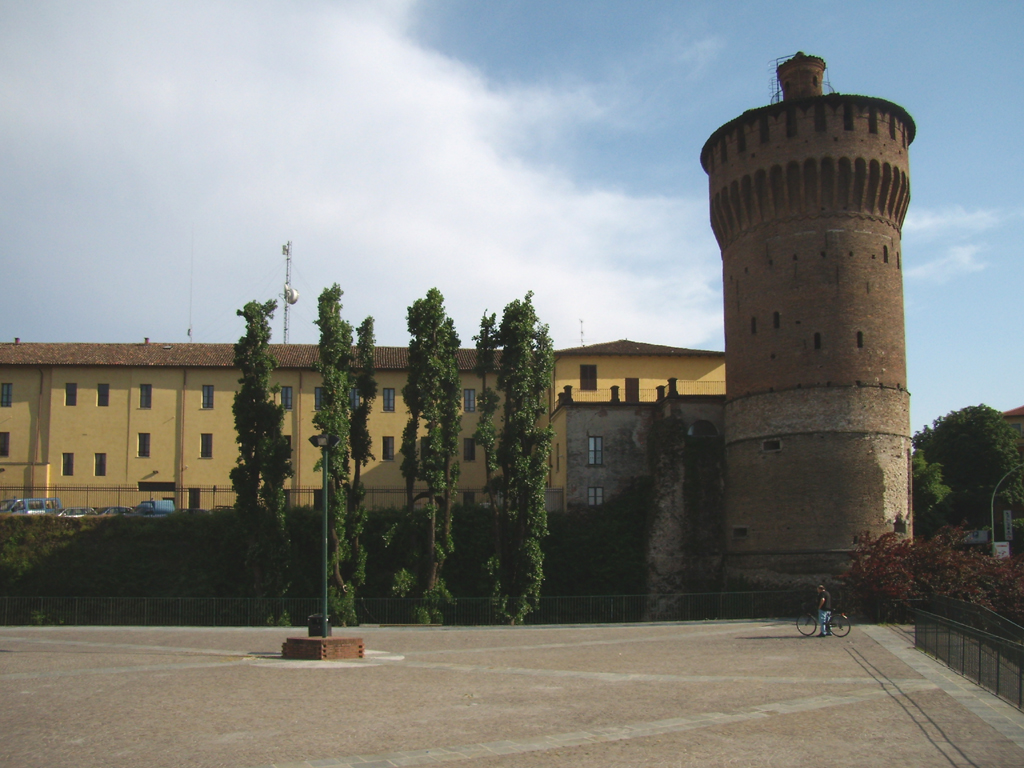
The main tower (Torrione) of the Visconti Castle

== Sources ==
- Conti, Flavio; Hybsch, Vincenzo; Vincenti, Antonello (1990). I castelli della Lombardia. Provincie di Milano e Pavia (in Italian). Novara: Istituto Geografico de Agostini. ISBN 88-402-9108-3.
