= Visconti-Castelbarco Castle =

Revival castle in Cislago, Lombardy, Italy

- Castello Visconti Castelbarco
- Cislago, Lombardy, Northern Italy
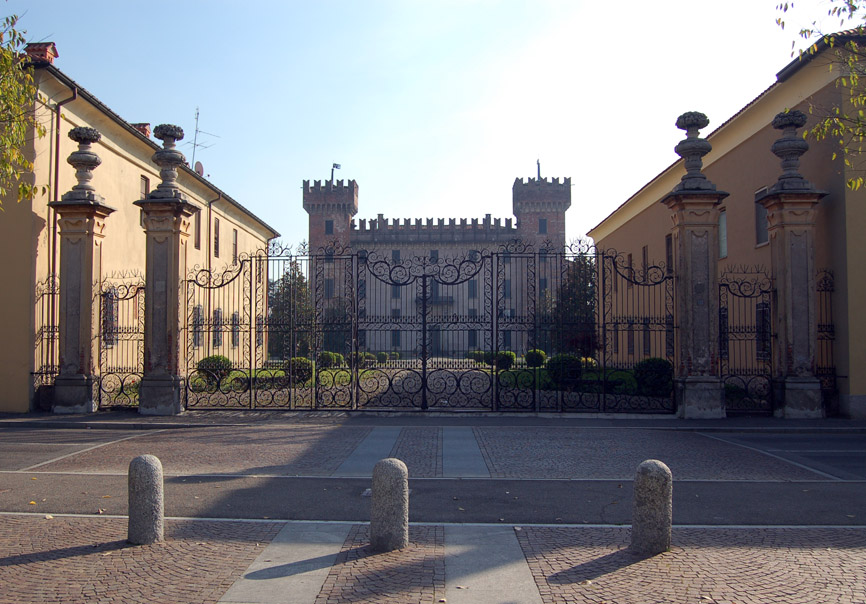
- The front of the castle as it appears from the Giardino Castelbarco

Site information
- Type: Revival castle
- Open to the public: No
- Condition: Excellent

Location
- Coordinates: 45°39′32″N 8°58′16″E

Site history
- Built: 13th, 17th centuries
- Built by: Visconti House members

The Visconti-Castelbarco Castle is a castle of medieval origin located in Cislago, Lombardy, Northern Italy. It belonged to a cadet branch of the Visconti House since the 13th century and became the property of the Castelbarco family in the 18th century.

== History ==
A fortification existed on the site of the current castle, at least since the 10th century. At the end of the 13th century, the castle became a property of the Visconti of Milan. It was then inherited by a lineage originated by Uberto, brother of Matteo Lord of Milan, initially the Visconti di Somma and later the Visconti di Cislago branch.

After being destroyed in the 17th century, the castle was raised again as a baroque villa on the original U-shaped plan, with two towers at the corners of the main façade. A crenellated roof was added to the building, giving it the current revival castle aspect.

The castle belonged to the Visconti di Cislago until the 18th century. The marriage of the last female member of the Visconti di Cislago into the Castelbarco family transferred the castle into the properties of her descendants, who assumed the surname Castelbarco Visconti.

== Today ==
Today, the castle is a private estate. A municipal park, Giardino Castelbarco, facing the front of the castle, is open to the public.

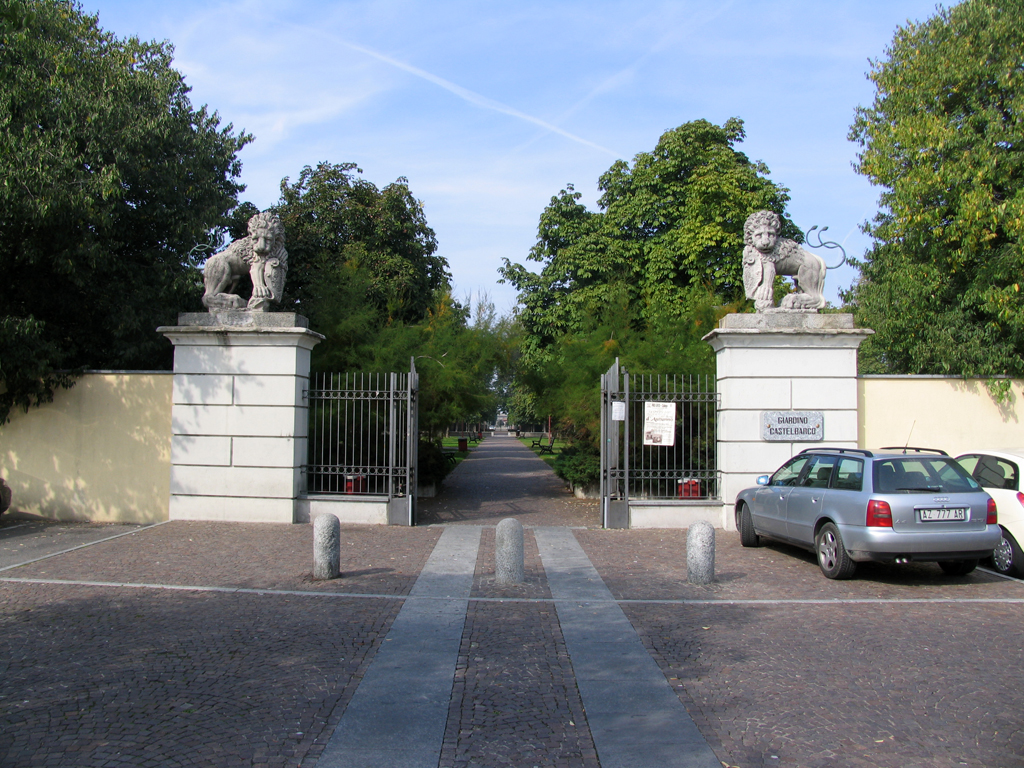
Entrance to the park in front of the castle

== Sources ==
- Langé, Santino (1968). Ville delle provincie di Como, Sondrio e Varese (in English and Italian). Milano: Edizioni SISAR. OCLC 230932924.
- Del Tredici, Federico; Rossetti, Edoardo (2012). Castle trails from Milan to Bellinzona - Guide to the dukedom's castles. Milan: Nexi-Castelli del ducato. ISBN 9788896451069. OCLC 955635027. Archived from the original on July 13, 2024.
