= Andrea Conti (basketball) =

Italian basketball player (born 1974)

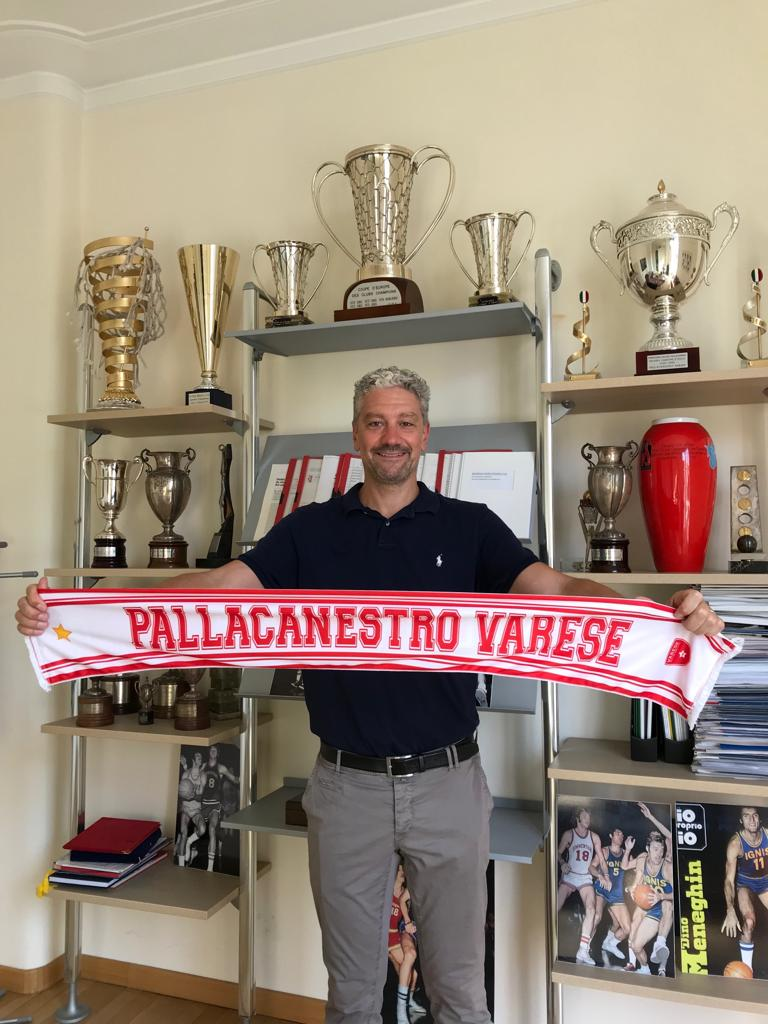
- Andrea Conti

Personal information
- Born: March 27, 1974 (age 52) Rho, Lombardy
- Listed height: 6 ft 7 in (2.01 m)
- Listed weight: 198 lb (90 kg)

Career information
- Playing career: 1990–2013
- Position: Forward

Career history
- 1990–1991: Basket Rho
- 1991–1994: Varese
- 1994–1995: Basket Rho
- 1995–1996: Robur Varese
- 1996–1997: Biella
- 1997–1998: Varese
- 1998–1999: Latina Basket
- 1999–2001: Vigevano
- 2001–2006: Triboldi Soresina
- 2007–2009: Juvi Cremona
- 2009–2011: Vanoli Cremona
- 2011–2012: Pavia
- 2012–2013: Vanoli Cremona

Andrea Conti (born March 27, 1974) is a former Italian professional basketball player. He last played for Vanoli Cremona.

Since November, 2013 he has been the General Manager of Vanoli Cremona.
