= John conti Coffee Company =

john conti Coffee Company
- Founded: 1962
- Founder: John Conti
- Headquarters: 4406 Ole Brickyard Circle, Louisville, Kentucky
- Brands: Contea; Aqua Conti
- Parent: Canteen of Kentuckiana
- Website: johnconti.com

The john conti Coffee Company is a roaster and supplier of high-grown Arabican coffees. The company was founded in 1962 and is based in Louisville, Kentucky, where its roasting facility also resides. Since 1990, it has used the trademark "The Best Coffee in Town". Beyond coffee, the company also makes Contea brand iced tea and Aqua Conti bottled water.

== History ==
John Conti started the company in 1962 in Louisville, Kentucky as the john conti Vending Co. The company began installing coffee units at offices in 1971 and opened a coffee store in 1976. With the coffee business expanding, the vending business was sold in 1982.

In 1977, the Louisville Today Magazine named it "The Best Coffee in Town". In 1990, the company applied for and received that tagline as a trademark.

A coffee museum that offered free coffee was built next to the Louisville factory, and operated until 2011. The brand expanded its market, being sold at Walmart and offered in single-serve brewing pods. It made a number of acquisitions to expand its presence.

John Conti retired in 2014, with Canteen of Kentuckiana subsequently running the business.

== Products ==
john Conti makes small batches of artisanal coffee. Beyond coffee, the company also makes Contea brand iced tea and Aqua Conti bottled water.
