= Mariana Conti =

Brazilian sociologist and politician

- Mariana in 2026

Member-elect of the Legislative Assembly of São Paulo
- Incumbent
- Assumed office 15 March 2027

Member of the Campinas City Council
- In office 1 January 2017 – 31 December 2026

Personal details
- Born: Mariana Conti Takahashi; 23 July 1985 (age 41) Campinas, São Paulo, Brazil
- Party: PSOL
- Education: State University of Campinas
- Occupation: Sociologist

Mariana Conti Takahashi (July 23, 1985) is a Brazilian sociologist and politician affiliated with the Socialism and Liberty Party (PSOL). She served as a city councilwoman in Campinas, and in 2026, she was elected to the Legislative Assembly of São Paulo (Alesp).

== Biography ==
=== First years and education ===
Mariana Conti Takahashi was born on 23 July 1985 in the city of Campinas, in the interior of São Paulo. She is one of four children born to an electrical engineer and a sociologist. She grew up in Americana, a city bordering Campinas, and enrolled at the State University of Campinas (Unicamp) in 2004 to study social sciences. During her undergraduate studies, she participated in the student movement and served as coordinator of the university’s Central Student Council.

In 2015, she completed her master’s degree in sociology with a thesis titled Florestan Fernandes: Imperialism and Class Struggle in the Era of Monopoly Capital, also at Unicamp, where the sociologist Florestan Fernandes had studied. In 2021, the university reported that Mariana was an administrative employee on leave to serve her elected term and that she was pursuing a Ph.D.

=== Politics ===
Mariana in 2024.

Mariana began her political activism while still a young woman, as part of the student movement at Unicamp. Between 2004 and 2007, she helped coordinate the Central Student Council, getting involved in protests related to public education, free public transportation, and the defense of women’s rights. Later, she became active in party politics with the Socialism and Liberty Party (PSOL).

Mariana Conti initially ran for city councilor in Campinas in the 2008 municipal elections, but was not elected. In the 2010 general elections, she ran for federal deputy representing São Paulo and was elected as an alternate. In 2012, she ran again for city councilor in Campinas and was elected as an alternate, even though she was the sixth-highest-voting candidate, her party did not meet the electoral threshold. In 2014, she ran for federal deputy and, once again, served as an alternate.

In the 2016 municipal elections, Mariana Conti was elected to the Campinas City Council as a member of the PSOL with 6,956 votes; she was the fourth-highest vote-getter for the City Council and the only woman elected to that legislature. In 2018, she ran for the first time for the position of state representative in the 2018 São Paulo state elections as a candidate for the PSOL. She received 35,307 votes and was elected as an alternate.

In the 2020 municipal elections, she was reelected with 10,886 votes, becoming the candidate with the most votes for the City Council in that election. It was the first time a woman had received the most votes for city council in the history of Campinas. During her second term, she participated in debates and initiatives related to women’s rights, human rights, public education, and public services. In 2022, she chaired a public hearing of the Campinas City Council aimed at discussing the activities and history of neo-Nazi and fascist organizations in the municipality. In the 2022 São Paulo state elections, she ran again for a seat in the Legislative Assembly of São Paulo. She received 43,988 votes and was once again elected as an alternate. In that same election, Mariana had previously announced her candidacy for governor of São Paulo. Mariana withdrew her candidacy after the PSOL declared its support for Fernando Haddad (PT).

In the 2024 municipal elections, she was reelected to the City Council with 14,356 votes, becoming the city’s top vote-getter for the second consecutive time. With this result, she began her third consecutive term as a city councilmember in 2025.

In October 2025, Mariana Conti took part in the Sumud Global Flotilla, which included other national and international public figures such as Brazilian activist Thiago Ávila and Swedish activist Greta Thunberg.

In the 2026 São Paulo state elections, she ran for office and was elected state representative with 126,344 votes, ranking as the 30th-highest vote-getter among those elected to the Legislative Assembly of São Paulo.

==== Electoral performance ====
Year	Election	Party	Office	Votes	Result	Ref.
2008	Campinas municipal	PSOL	City councillor	1,772	Not elected	
2010	São Paulo state	PSOL	Federal deputy	3,133	Not elected	
2012	Campinas municipal	PSOL	City councillor	5,953	Not elected	
2014	São Paulo state	PSOL	Federal deputy	16,914	Not elected	
2016	Campinas municipal	PSOL	City councillor	6,956	Elected	
2018	São Paulo state	PSOL	State deputy	35,307	Not elected	
2020	Campinas municipal	PSOL	City councillor	10,886	Elected	
2022	São Paulo state	PSOL	State deputy	43,988	Not elected	
2024	Campinas municipal	PSOL	City councillor	14,356	Elected	
2026	São Paulo state	PSOL	State deputy	126,344	Elected	
