= Gabriella Conti Armellini =

Italian astronomer (1891–1974)

- Born: Gabriella Conti; 19 March 1891; Rome, Italy
- Died: 8 November 1974 (aged 83); Rome, Italy
- Education: University of Naples Federico II
- Occupation: Astronomer
- Spouse: Giuseppe Armellini

Gabriella Conti Armellini (19 March 1891 – 8 November 1974), also known as Armellini Conti, Gabriella was an Italian astronomer. She became administrator of the Roman observatory and published research on positional astronomy and solar astronomy. For her work, she received the Order of Merit of the Italian Republic.

== Biography ==
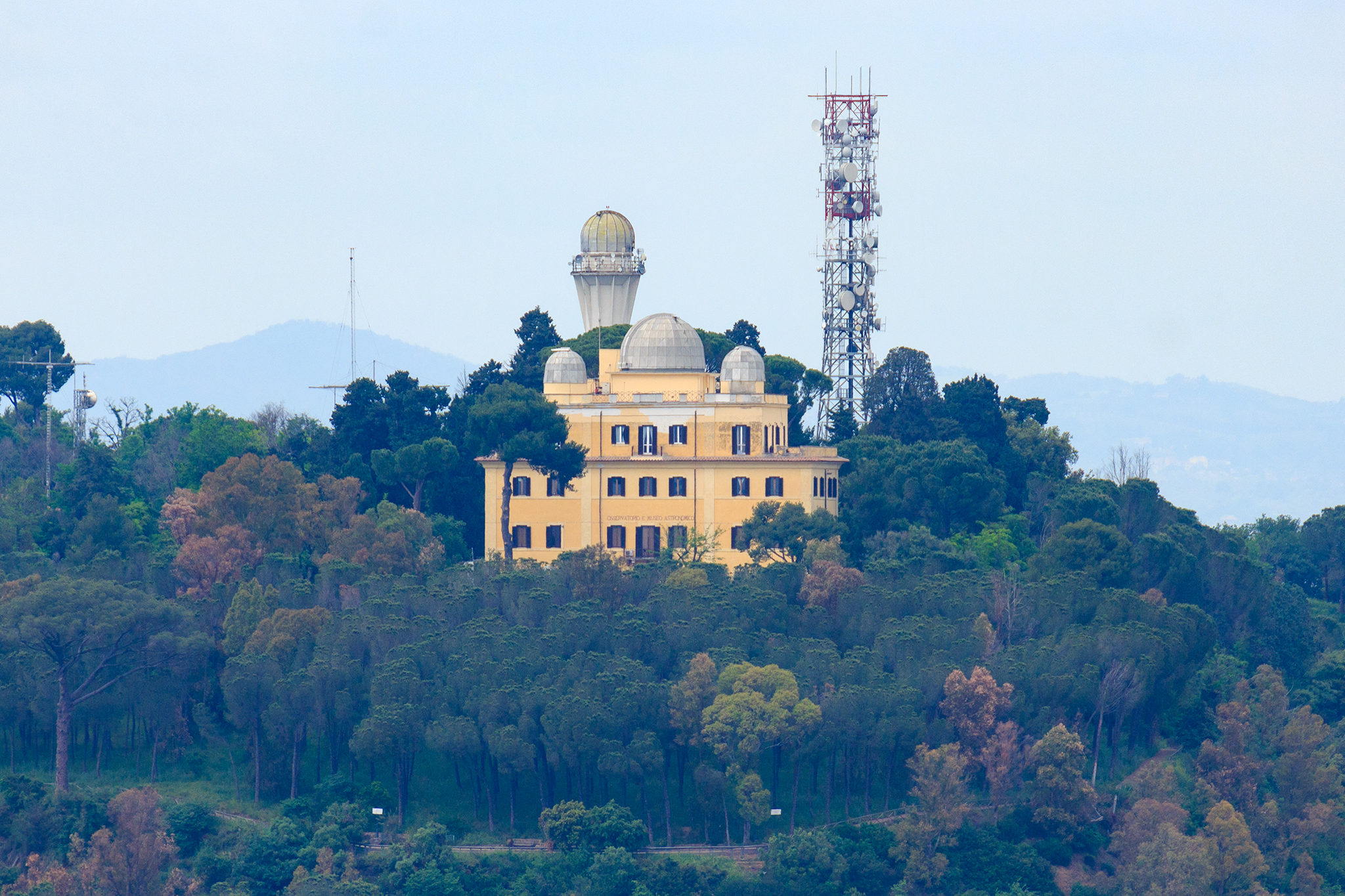
Monte Mario Observatory with the Solar Tower rising on the left behind it.

She was born Gabriella Conti in Rome in 1891. After graduating in physics at the University of Naples in 1919, she became a mathematics and physics teacher at the "Pietro Giannone" high school in Benevento. At the same time, she began working as an assistant at the Collurania-Teramo Observatory in Teramo, in the Abruzzo region of central Italy under the guidance of astronomer Vincenzo Cerulli. She remained in both positions until April 1922 when she was transferred to the Astronomical Observatory of the Campidoglio in Rome where she was an assistant and then a first-class astronomer.

In 1923, she married Giuseppe Armellini, director of the Campidoglio Observatory and the main architect of the creation of its replacement, the Astronomical Observatory of the Campidoglio, on Monte Mario, the highest of the hills surrounding Rome. The new observatory, inaugurated in 1938, was equipped with an imposing solar tower and modern instrumentation, which became very helpful to Conti's research.

At Monte Mario, she took advantage of the solar tower and the latest generation of instrumentation, dedicating herself to visual photometry, positional astronomy and solar astronomy. In particular, she investigated the perturbations of large planets, asteroids and comets. She was also concerned with the measurement of solar radiation and solar diameters, and she conducted research on timetables and meteorology.

Her research in meteorology concerned the exact determination of Roman time, which the Observatory dutifully communicated to the municipality of Rome every day for the city's time service.

During her career, Conti Armellini published in prestigious journals, such as the Astronomische Nachrichten, the Rendiconti edited by the Accademia dei Lincei and the Memorie della società astronomica italiana.

She retired in 1961, and some of her archives are kept at the Roman observatory. Gabriella Conti Armellini died on 8 November 1974 in Rome.

== Honors ==
- Gold Medal from the Ministry of Education
- Knight of the Order of Merit of the Republic for special services to the nation

== Selected works ==
- Armellini Conti, G. "Observations of the positions of planets and asteroids and lunar occultations." Memoirs of the Italian Astronomical Society, Vol. 21, p. 11 21 (1950): 11.
- Armellini Conti, G. "Positions of planets and asteroids and lunar occultations observed in 1950." Memoirs of the Italian Astronomical Society, Vol. 22, p. 89 22 (1951): 89.
- Armellini Conti, G. "Positions of planets and asteroids and lunar occultations observed at Monte Mario in 1954." Memoirs of the Italian Astronomical Society, Vol. 26, p. 193 26 (1955): 193.
- Armellini Conti, G. "Positions of planets, asteroids, and comets, and lunar occultations observed at Monte Mario in 1955." Memoirs of the Italian Astronomical Society, Vol. 27, p. 191 27 (1956): 191.
