= Giovanni Colonna (died 1245) =

Italian cardinal

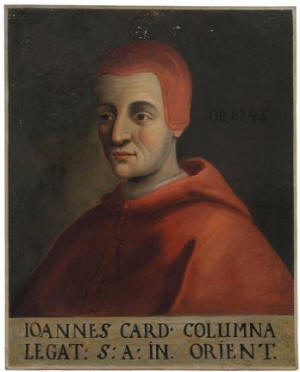
Posthumous portrait of Colonna

Giovanni Colonna (died 28 January 1245) was a cardinal of the Catholic Church.

Giovanni was a member of the Roman noble family of Colonna. His father was Oddone di Pietro Colonna, a member of the entourage of the Emperor Henry VI in 1195. His brothers were Landolfo, Oddone and Giordano. His date of birth is unknown. His first appearance in the surviving record is from 1203. He bore the title magister, but nothing is known of his education. He acquired a benefice in England sometime before becoming a cardinal. He later added more, being on good terms with Kings John and Henry III.

Colonna was made the cardinal deacon of Santi Giovanni e Paolo al Celio in May 1206 by Pope Innocent III. He was not prominent under Innocent III and worked mostly in the Roman curia. He is last recorded as a cardinal deacon on 22 December 1216. In February 1217, Pope Honorius III promoted him cardinal priest of Santa Prassede.

On 21 April 1217, Honorius III appointed Colonna papal legate to the Latin East. He accompanied the Latin Emperor Peter to Epirus, where they were taken captive by Theodore Komnenos Doukas. Through papal intervention, Colonna was released in early 1218. He continued to Constantinople, where he supported the Empress Yolanda until her death in September 1219, when he took the reins of government. He returned to Rome in 1222, bringing with him the relic of the Column of the Flagellation.

Colonna participated in the conclaves of 1216 (election of Honorius III), 1227 (Pope Gregory IX) and 1243 (Pope Innocent IV). He was one of the leaders of the papal army in the War of the Keys (1228–1229) and a negotiator of the Treaty of San Germano (1230).
