= Febo Conti =

Italian presenter and actor (1926–2012)

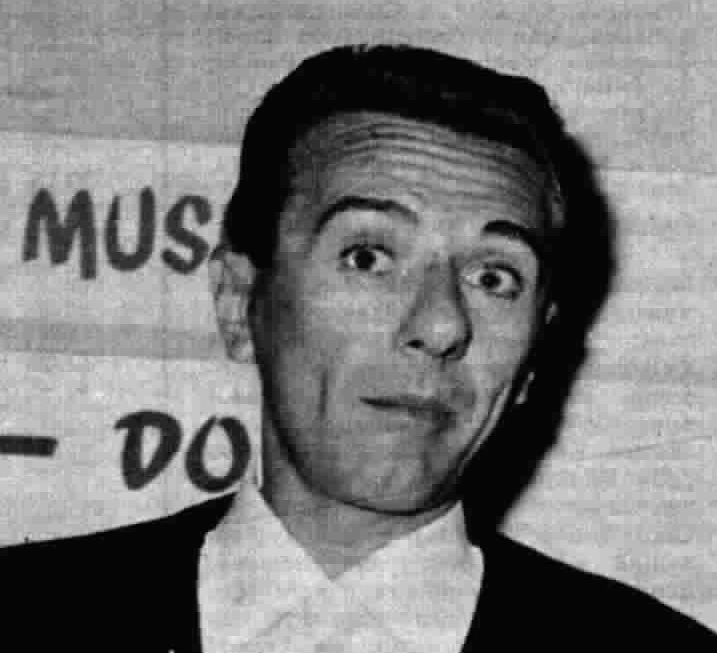
Conti in 1970

Febo Conti (25 December 1926 – 16 December 2012) was an Italian TV and radio presenter and actor.

Born in Bresso, Conti started his career as radio-host in Radio Italia Nord, and then in RTSI. He was best known as host of the RAI TV quiz show Chissà chi lo sa? (trad. "Who knows, who knows?") that put in front two teams of students from different schools with an encyclopedia as the prize. The show was a huge success and it was broadcast for thirteen years. Conti was also co-founder and, between 1975 and 1980, manager of the theme park Gardaland.

He joined the Grand Orient of Italy in 1966 and became Grand Master in 1973.
