= Niccolò de Romanis =

Italian cardinal and Papal legate

Niccolò de Romanis (died 1218) was an Italian cardinal and Papal legate. He was Bishop of Frascati from either 1204 or 1205 and Grand penitentiary. He was closely associated with Pope Honorius III as administrator and diplomat. Dean of the College of Cardinals from 1211.

== Legate to England ==
In 1207, Pope Innocent III placed the kingdom of England under an Interdict as the result of actions taken by King John (1199–1215) culminating in a debate over the appointment for a successor to the Archbishop of Canterbury. The Interdict would stand until 1213 when John finally accepted Innocent's choice of Stephen Langton as Archbishop of Canterbury. Nicholas acted as Innocent's main negotiator throughout the Interdict, arriving in September 1213 in order to settle its lifting.

He deposed the corrupt Roger Norreys at Evesham Abbey, and finally at Penwortham Abbey. He also intervened at Bardney Abbey to depose the abbot, and put out Ralph de Arundel, abbot of Westminster.

He attempted to mediate between John and his barons, taking up the issue of sheriffs, and trying to fulfil his papal brief to calm factions.

=== At Oxford ===
During the time the Interdict was in effect, a scholar at Oxford was accused in 1209 of raping a woman. When the burghers couldn't find the scholar, they hanged three of his friends in retaliation for his crime. The school at Oxford protested by abandoning the city and scattering to other schools throughout England, possibly setting up a facility in Cambridge.

On 1 October 1213, while Nicholas de Romanis was working to bring about the end of the Interdict, the citizens of Oxford sent him a letter asking him to resolve their problems with the scholars who had taught there. de Romanis agreed to help, visiting the city twice, in November 1213 and May 1214. On 20 June 1214 de Romanis's actions resulted in the issuance of the Charter for the University of Oxford.

Among other items, the citizens agreed to charge fixed rates for student housing and food, an annual payment to the school, the right of the school to judge anyone associated with the school and the creation of a Chancellor for the University.
