= Visconti-Sforza Castle (Novara) =

Visconti-Sforza Castle, Novara
- Novara
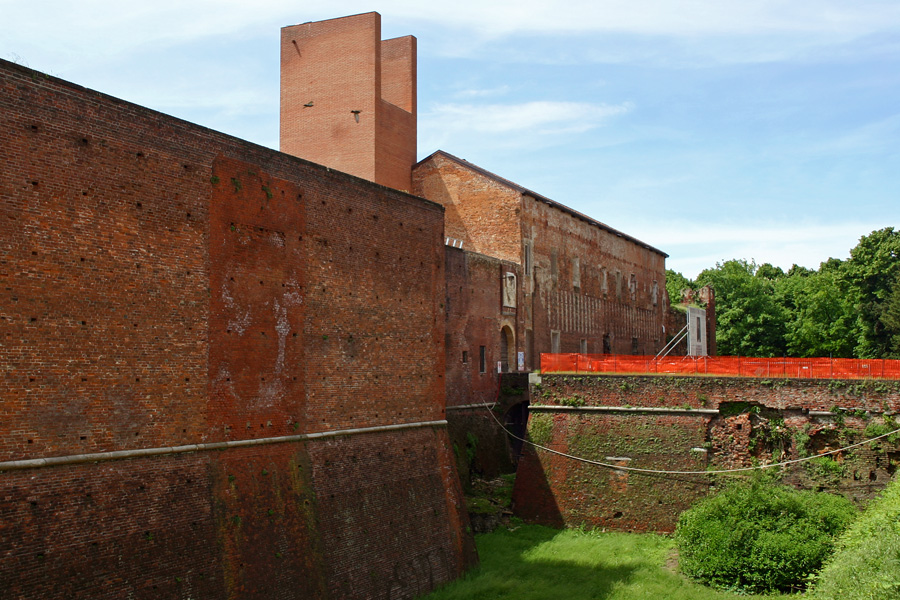
- The front of the castle in a 2010 photo during the restoration

Site information
- Type: Medieval castle

Location
- Coordinates: 45°26′40″N 8°37′03″E

Site history
- Built: 13th century
- Built by: Francesco Della Torre, Giovanni Visconti

The Visconti-Sforza Castle of Novara is a castle located in the south-western border of the old center of Novara. It was erected on the former corner of the Roman and Middle Age walls that surrounded the city.

== History ==
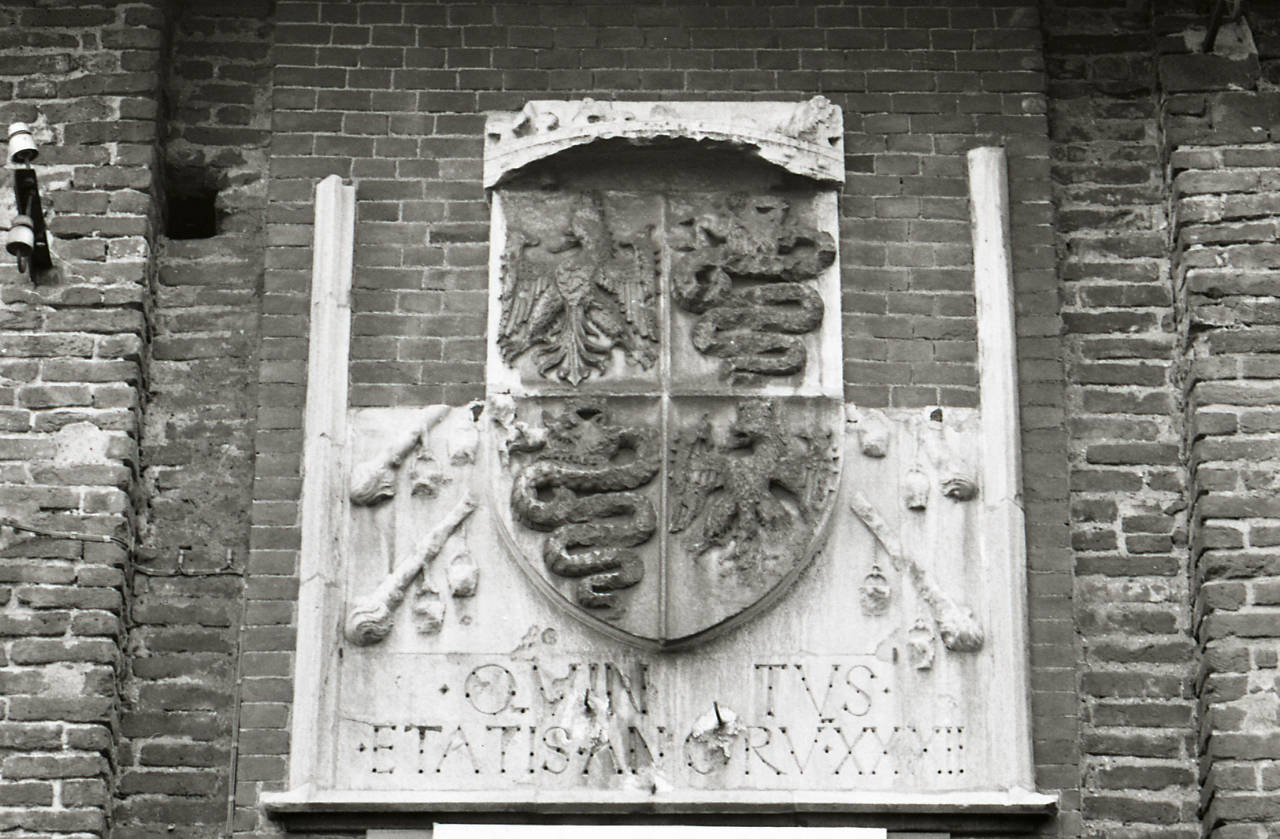
Coats of arms of the Visconti family above the entrance arch. Photo by Paolo Monti, 1980.

The origin of the castle is connected to the transfer of Novara under the influence of Milan, taking place in the second half of the 13th century. In 1272 Francesco Della Torre (member of the family ruler of Milan), after taking over the city, ordered the construction of a fortification on the site belonged to the Tettoni family. In the 14th century, after the exchange of the ruling families from the Della Torre to the Visconti, the Lord of Milan Giovanni Visconti (1339-1354) paid again attention to Novara and had the castle built. The castle was strengthened by his successors Galeazzo II (1354-1378) and Gian Galeazzo (1378-1402). Works and repairs were done over the years by Francesco Sforza. His son, the duke Galeazzo Maria, carried out the major transformation of the building.

After almost ten years of restoration, in January 2016 the castle was reopened to the public.
