= Giacomo Conti (artist) =

Italian painter (1813–1888)

This article is partially translated from the Italian Wikipedia.

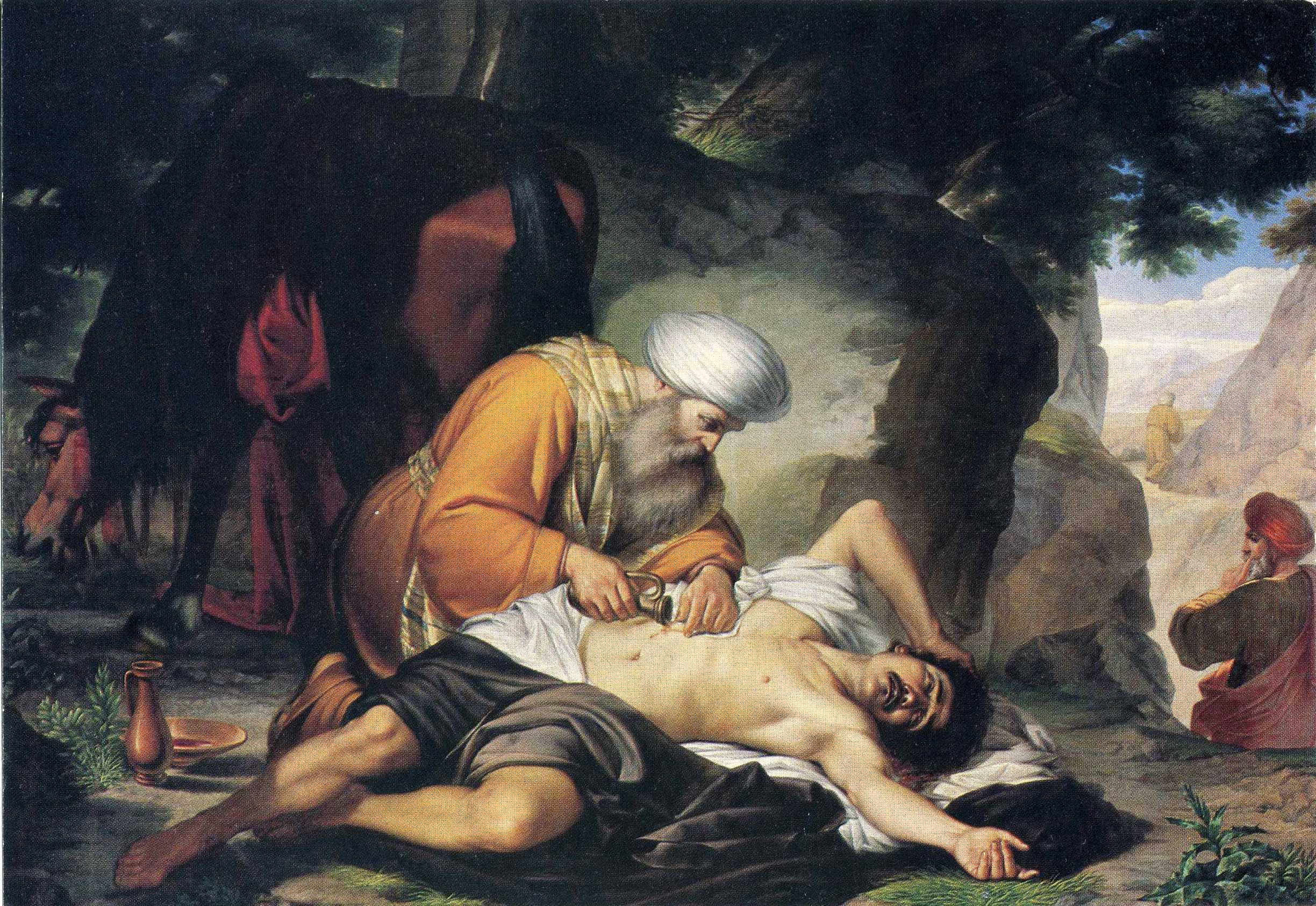
Parable of the Good Samaritan by Giacomo Conti, in the Museo Regionale, Messina.

Giacomo Conti (2 November 1813, in Messina – 9 April 1888, in Florence) was an Italian painter trained under Francesco Podesti. He studied neoclassicism at the Academy of St Luke between 1834 and 1836.
