= La domenica sportiva =

- Presented by: Simona Rolandi
- Country of origin: Italy
- No. of episodes: 3577

Production
- Running time: 120 min

Original release
- Network: Rai 2
- Release: October 11, 1953 – present

La domenica sportiva ("The Sports Sunday") is an Italian television sport programme. It has been broadcast since 1953, making it one of RAI's longest running television shows. It traditionally broadcasts the highlights of the Serie A. On February 25, 2024, it reached the milestone of 3,500 episodes.
