= Niccolò dei Conti di Segni =

Niccolo Conti di Segni - Italian cardinal allegedly created by Pope Gregory IX with the title of San Marcello in the consistory of December 1228 (or 1230) and subsequently sent as papal legate to Armenia to mediate in the conflicts between king Hethum I of Armenia and the Principality of Antioch; king Hethum I considered him partial in favor of the Principality of Antioch and asked pope for his recalling. He is said to have died in 1239.

Some scholars doubt the existence of this cardinal because he did not subscribe to any papal bulls and his legation in Armenia needs to be attested in the contemporary sources. Agostino Paravicini Bagliani indicates that he's confused with Niccolo da Anagni (1206–72), nephew of Pope Gregory IX, who was only the lower official of the Roman Curia during his pontificate. He was never promoted to the cardinalate, despite serving as camerlengo of the Holy Roman Church under Pope Alexander IV (1254–61).

== Bibliography ==
Agostino Paravicini Bagliani, Cardinali di curia e "familiae" cardinalizie. Dal 1227 al 1254, vol. II, Padova 1972, p. 531-532
