= Francesco Conti (cardinal) =

Italian Roman Catholic archbishop and cardinal

Francesco Conti (c. 1470 in Rome – 1521 in Rome) was an Italian Roman Catholic archbishop and cardinal.

== Life ==
The son of Jacopo Conti, signore of Carpineto (and a member of the Roman nobility); and Elisabetta Carafa della Stadera. His uncle was the Cardinal Giovanni Conti. Francesco Conti was educated in law.

Francesco Conti was the father of six illegitimate children, five sons and one daughter; Ottavio, Stefano, Camillo, Marzio, Giovanni and Giulia.

He died on 29 June 1521 and was originally buried in San Vitale (Rome).

== Career ==
On 8 October 1494 he was appointed archbishop of Conza and remained in this position until his resignation on 11 September 1517.

He never visited the archdiocese, ruling through a series of vicars general.

Pope Leo X made Conti a cardinal priest in the consistory on 1 July 1517. He received the red hat and the titular church of San Vitale on 6 July 1517 and served as Camerlengo of the Sacred College of Cardinals from 11 January 1520 to 7 January 1521.

== See also ==
- Catholic Church in Italy
