= Nicolò Carosio =

Italian journalist (1907–1984)

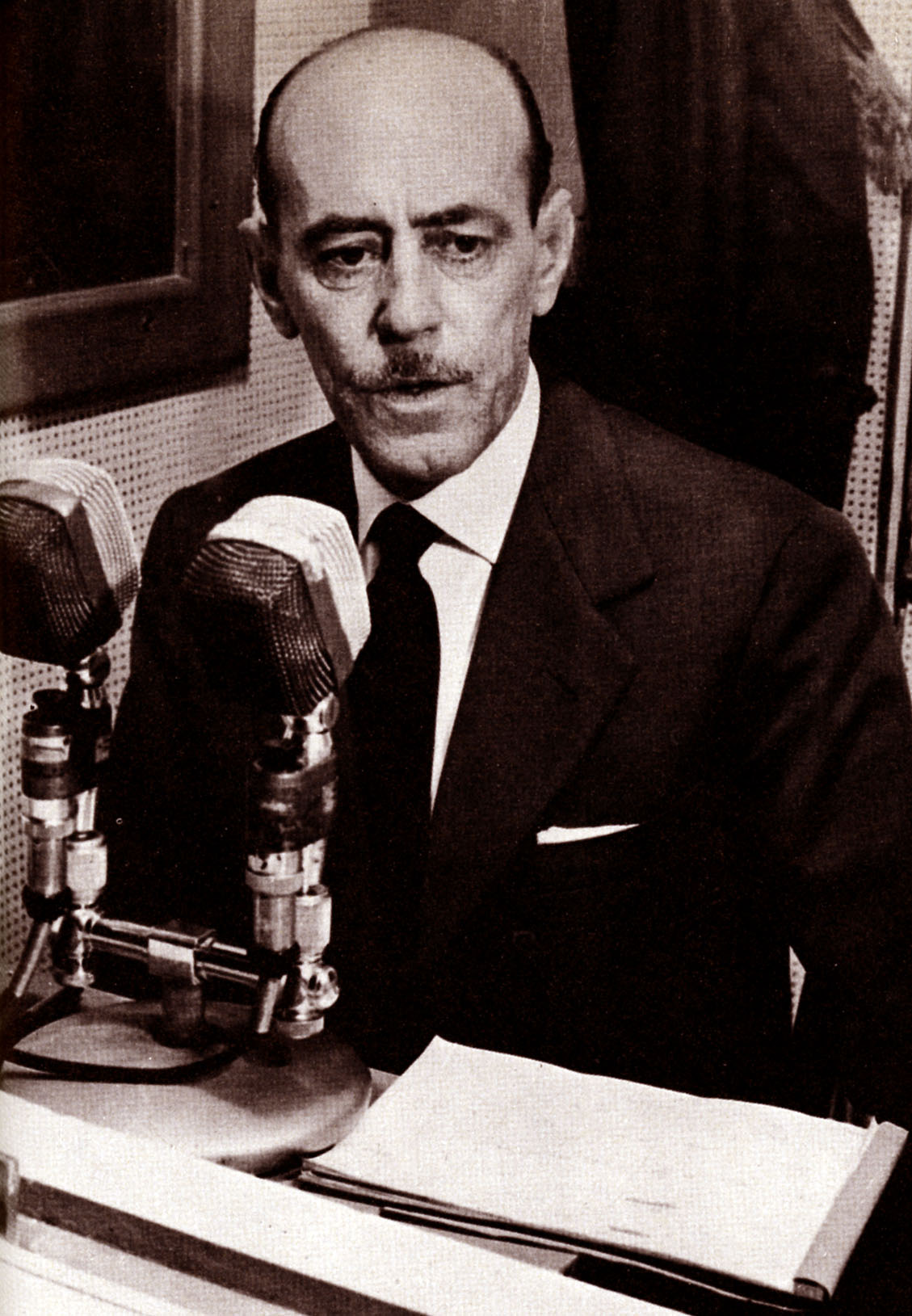
- Born: 15 March 1907; Palermo, Sicily, Italy
- Died: 27 September 1984 (aged 77); Milan, Lombardy, Italy

Nicolò Carosio (15 March 1907 – 27 September 1984) was an Italian sport journalist and commentator.

Born in Palermo, the son of a customs inspector and a Maltese pianist, Carosio graduated in law, then he decided to participate in a contest organized by radio broadcaster EIAR, winning it. He debuted as a sport commentator on radio in 1933, while in 1954 he made his television debut. He commented more than three thousand sport matches and he was the official commentator of matches involving the Italy national football team for over thirty years, retiring in 1971.

After the retirement he wrote a column in the weekly comic book Topolino ("Vi parla Nicolò Carosio") and appeared as himself in the 1974 comedy film L'arbitro. In 2007, on the centenary of his birth, Poste italiane released a stamp dedicated to his memory.

In 1949, due to the concomitant ceremony of the confirmation of his son, he had to renounce the trip to Lisbon with the Grande Torino, a circumstance that saved his life due to the plane of the team crashing against the Basilica di Superga during the return journey (Superga air disaster).
