= Visconti-Sforza Castle (Vigevano) =

- Castello Visconteo-Sforzesco di Vigevano
- Vigevano
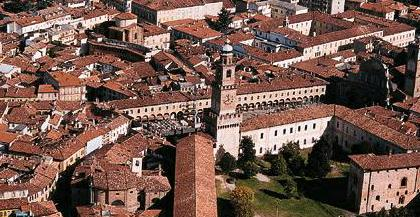
- Aerial view of the northern part of the Visconti-Sforza Castle with the Piazza Ducale in the background

Site information
- Type: Medieval castle

Location
- Coordinates: 45°18′58″N 8°51′24″E

Site history
- Built: 14th, 15th centuries
- Built by: Luchino Visconti, Gian Galeazzo Visconti, Ludovico il Moro, Gian Galeazzo Sforza

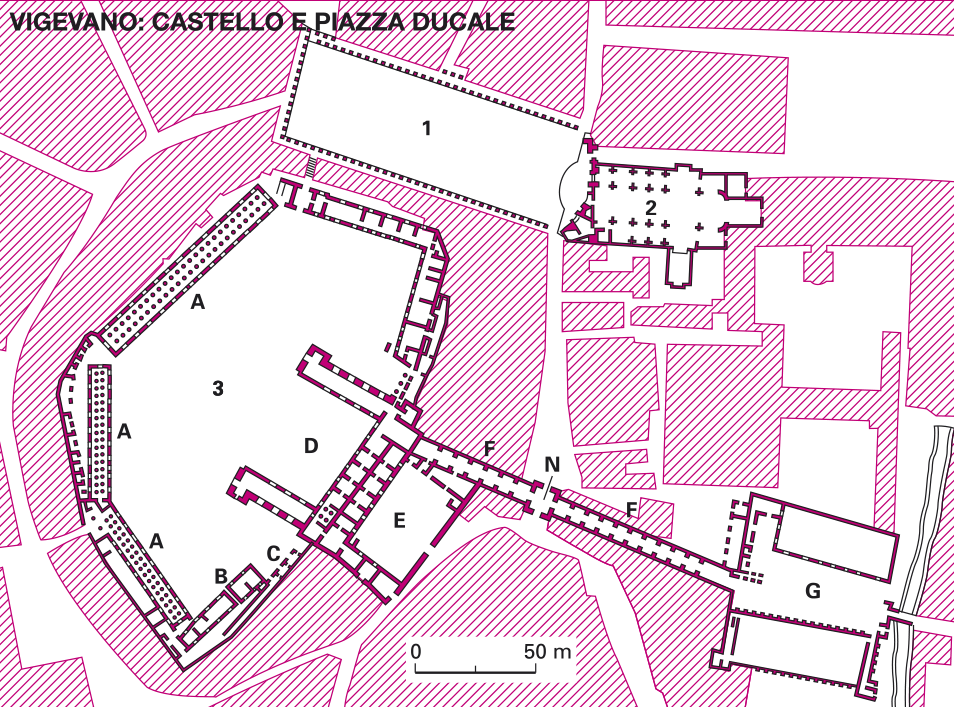
Plan of castle and piazza ducale

The Visconti-Sforza Castle is a mediaeval castle located in the centre of the city of Vigevano, Lombardy, Northern Italy. In the 14th and 15th centuries, members of the Visconti and Sforza houses, lords and dukes of Milan, transformed a previous fortification into a vast family resort. The castle was part of a wider plan of urban development for Vigevano, which included the erection of other buildings and the construction of the central Piazza Ducale.

== History ==
=== The Visconti-Sforza period ===
Luchino Visconti, Lord of Milan and ruler of Vigevano since 1337, began to transform the existing fortification into a local residence for his family. The construction was continued by Gian Galeazzo Visconti, first Duke of Milan, and completed by his heirs, Ludovico il Moro and his grandchild Gian Galeazzo Sforza. Donato Bramante had been working on the project of the castle. Leonardo da Vinci is known to have frequented Vigevano and supposedly attended to the works. The castle was completed in the last years of the 15th century.

The result was a wide resort covering a surface of 70,000 square meters. The castle consisted of several buildings arranged elliptically and serving different purposes. The imposing main body (Maschio or Ducal Palace) had a U-shape plan with the two wings facing the center of the courtyard of the castle. The Ladies' Palace (Loggia delle Dame), built by Bramante, was reserved to the Duchess and the ladies of the court. A building for the breeding of falcons (Falconiera) and stables for horses (Scuderie) were also part of the castle. The Falconiera was connected to the Ducal Palace through a loggia elevated over the ground. The tower of the castle (Bramante Tower) was modeled after that of the Milan Castle, designed by Filarete. Raised to be visible from the center of Vigevano, it was completed in 1491.

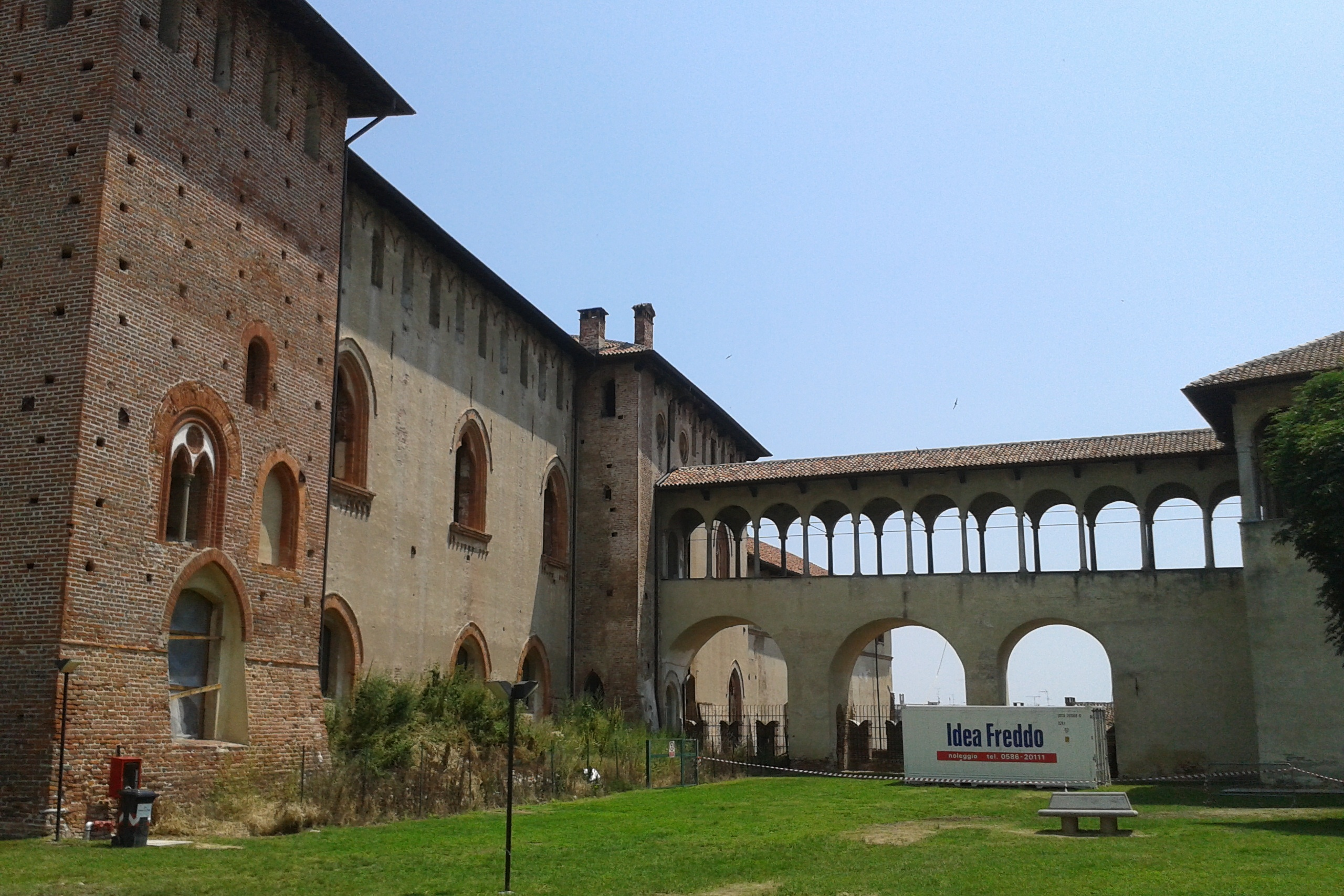
The loggia connecting the Falconiera to the main body of the castle

The 14th and 15th centuries were a period of great transformation for Vigevano. The adjacent piazza of the city (Piazza Ducale) was constructed, and other buildings erected: the Rocca Vecchia (or Rocca di Belriguardo) and the Palazzo Sanseverino (or Rocca Nuova). The nearby Rocca Vecchia was connected to the castle through a covered and elevated road (Strada Coperta).

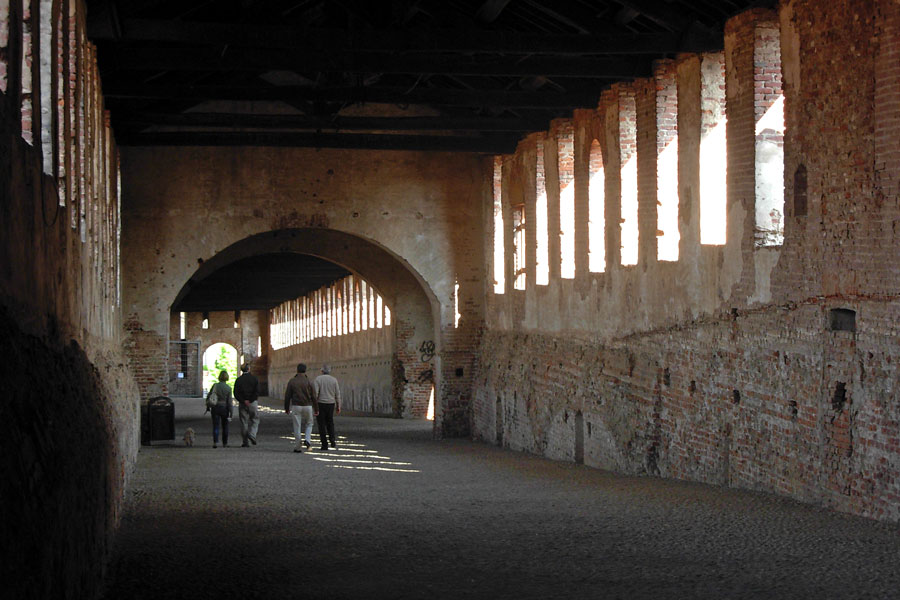
The covered road joining the Rocca Vecchia to the castle

The castle continued to be used by the members of the Sforza House. At the end of the 15th century, the castle was frequented by Beatrice d'Este, wife of Ludovico il Moro, who gave prestige to Vigevano as a courteous residence. Francesco II Sforza, the last ruler of the House, died in Vigevano on 24 October 1535.

=== Subsequent transformations and restorations ===
After the end of the Sforza dynasty, under the Spanish Habsburg rule (1556–1707), the use of the castle suffered a slow decline. Before the Baroque era, when the facade of the Sant'Ambrogio Cathedral was completed, the Piazza Ducale was connected to the entrance of the tower and to the court of the castle.

Since the 18th century the castle had been used for military purposes, initially by the Austrian and then by the Italian Army.

Ceased its military use in 1968, the castle remained abandoned until 1980, when the first restorations began. Since then, a part of the castle has been progressively opened to the public.

== Today ==
The restored rooms of the castle host today the city museum, while the largest portion remains unused. Part of the Scuderie is used for exhibitions.

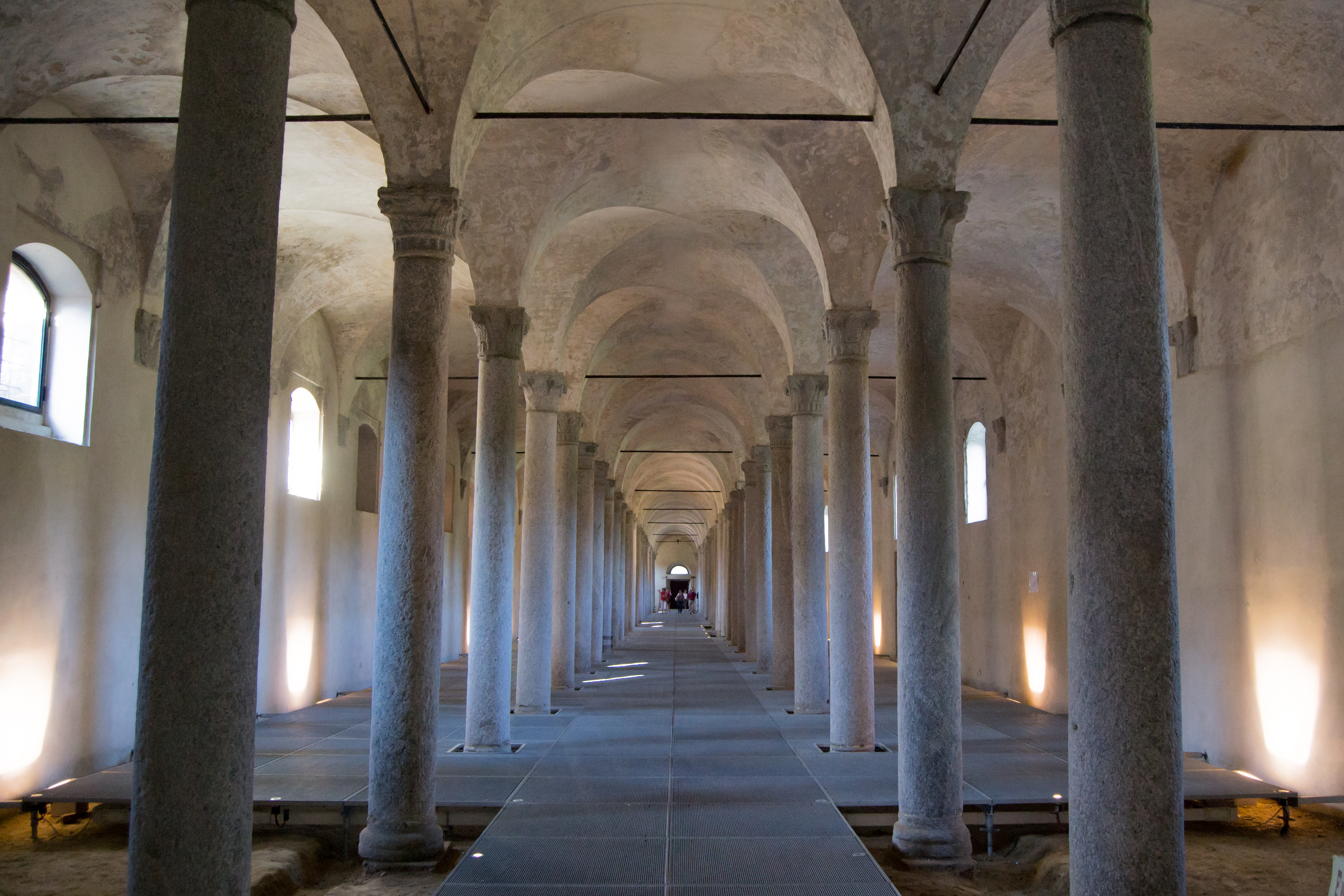
One of the restored Scuderie, originally used as horse stable

Along the year 2019, the castle housed several events organized by the city of Vigevano to celebrate the 500th anniversary of Leonardo da Vinci's death.

== Sources ==
- Cartwright Ady, Julia Mary (1899). Beatrice D'Este, Duchess of Milan, 1475-1497: A Study of the Renaissance. Books for Libraries Press. ISBN 9780836967623.
- Castex, Jean (2008). Architecture of Italy. ABC-CLIO. ISBN 9780313350870.
- Kemp, Martin (2006). Leonardo Da Vinci: The Marvellous Works of Nature and Man. Oxford University Press. ISBN 9780192807250.
- Lubkin, Gregory (1994). A Renaissance Court: Milan under Galeazzo Maria Sforza. Berkeley: University of California Press. ISBN 9780520081468.
