= Giovanni Conti (cardinal) =

Italian Roman Catholic bishop and cardinal

Giovanni Conti (1414–1493) (called Cardinal Conti) was an Italian Roman Catholic bishop and cardinal.

== Biography ==
Giovanni Conti was born in Rome in 1414, a member of the Conti family from Valmontone.

He served as an Apostolic Subdeacon.

On 26 January 1455 he was elected Archbishop of Conza; he held this position until 1 October 1484, when he resigned in favor of his nephew Niccolò.

On 15 November 1483, in a consistory celebrated in St. Peter's Basilica, Pope Sixtus IV made Conti a cardinal priest. He received the titular church of Santi Nereo e Achilleo on the same day, and received the red hat four days later.

He participated in the papal conclave of 1484, where he was the preferred candidate of the Orsini family, though he ultimately lost the election to Giovanni Battista Cibo, who took the name Pope Innocent VIII.

On 9 March 1489 he opted for the titular church of San Vitale.

He participated in the papal conclave of 1492 that elected Pope Alexander VI.

He died of bubonic plague in Rome on 20 October 1493. He is buried in Santa Maria in Aracoeli.
