= Giovanni dei Conti di Segni =

Italian cardinal

Giovanni dei Conti di Segni

Giovanni dei Conti di Segni (died 14 June 1213) was an Italian cardinal and cardinal-nephew of Pope Innocent III, his cousin, who elevated him in 1200 with the deaconry of Santa Maria in Cosmedin. He was also Chancellor of the Holy Roman Church 1205–1213 and Protodeacon of the Sacred College from 1210 or 1211.
