= Ottaviano dei Conti di Segni =

Italian cardinal and cardinal-nephew of Pope Innocent III

Ottaviano dei Conti di Segni (died 29 January 1234) was an Italian cardinal and cardinal-nephew of Pope Innocent III, his cousin who elevated him probably in May 1206. He was canon of the Vatican Basilica, Camerlengo of the Holy Roman Church (1200 until May 1206) and protodeacon of the Sacred College of Cardinals (from 1221).
