= 1243 papal election =

Election of Catholic Pope Innocent IV

Papal election May – June 1243

Dates and location
- 16 May–25 June 1243; Anagni Cathedral

Key officials
- Protodeacon: Raniero Capocci

Elected pope
- Sinibaldo Fieschi; Name taken: Innocent IV
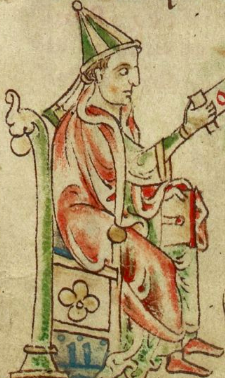

The 1243 papal election (16 May – 25 June) elected Cardinal Sinibaldo Fieschi of Genoa to succeed Pope Celestine IV. The conclave began after the Holy See had been vacant for 18 months and six days, therefore ca. May 16, 1243. There were nine cardinals present. Six votes were needed, therefore, for a canonical election. It took some five weeks for the cardinals to agree on an acceptable candidate. Fieschi took the name Innocent IV.

== Election of 1241 ==
The election which took place around the death of Pope Gregory IX on August 22, 1241, was a particularly stressful one. There were military operations, both inside and outside the City of Rome, towns and properties were destroyed, Guelphs and Ghibellines warred against each other, and two of the cardinals were captured in battle and were held prisoner by the Emperor Frederick II. When the electoral meeting began, only ten of the twelve cardinals participated. The cardinals were tightly confined, on orders of the Senator of Rome, Matteo Rosso Orsini, and during that conclave one cardinal died. After seven weeks of deadlocked negotiations in the summer heat of Rome, the cardinals finally managed to produce the required two-thirds majority on October 25 for Cardinal Goffredo Castiglione, who chose the name Celestine IV. Pope Celestine was never crowned. It is also said that he was never consecrated, which is pointless, since he was already a bishop, and that he never issued a bull, which is contested. He died, old and ill, only seventeen days after his election, on November 10, 1241.

A second Election would have to be held. But, even though Pope Celestine was buried on the day after his death, according to custom, certain cardinals had already left Rome, being unwilling to endure the situation of September and October again. Matthew of Paris says that there were "maybe six, maybe seven" cardinals left in Rome, which would imply that one or two had left. He certainly includes Cardinal Raynaldus dei Conti and Cardinal Sinibaldo Fieschi in the minority. Matthew also reports that the cardinals who were still in Rome were in hiding with friends and relations, some of them ill.

== No Election in 1242 ==
Emperor Frederick had left the neighborhood of Rome in September, 1241, while the Election was still in progress. He was back at his palace in Foggia in October. His third wife, Isabella of England, daughter of King John, died on 1 December 1241, and on 12 February (?), 1242, his son King Henry of Germany died as well. He spent the entire year 1242 in the south in his own kingdom, mostly in Foggia, Capua, or Naples. He came nowhere near Rome or the cardinals. He was, however, in contact with the cardinals. In February 1242 he sent three ambassadors to Rome to the Papal Curia, to discuss a peace. Frederick wanted the cardinals to get together and make a pope. He also wrote directly to them, offering to release Cardinal Jacobus de Pecorara and Cardinal Oddo de Monferrato if the cardinals would proceed to an election. The Emperor wrote a second time, in May, an elaborate rhetorical exercise based on the topos of the Church as a ship without its steersman and the danger of shipwreck (schism). This was for public consumption. Another letter followed in July, more directly accusing the cardinals of driving the ship off-course: how could they show the right path to those who had wandered from it, if they themselves were wandering off the right course?

In the Spring of 1243, after a vacancy that had gone on for more than fifteen months, cardinals who had gathered at Anagni during that time, wrote a letter to an English prelate, placing their names in the heading:

R[aynaldus] Ostiensis et Velletrensis, J[ohannes] tituli Sanctae Praxedis, S[inibaldus] tituli Sancti Luarentii in Lucina, S[tephanus] tituli Sanctae Mariae trans Tyberim, presbyteri; R[aynerius] Sanctae Mariae in Cosmedin, E[gidius] Sanctorum Cosmae et Damiani, O[tho] Sancti Nicholai in carcere Tulliano, diaconi; sanctae Ecclesiae Romanae Cardinales.

Cardinal Oddone di Monferrato was present in Anagni and signed the letter; he had been released by the Emperor in August 1242. Cardinal Romano Bonaventura did not sign; he had died on February 21, 1243. The names of these seven cardinals show who had left Rome by that time, and that the balance was shifting between the Imperial party (Ghibbelines) led by the Colonna, and the opposition, led by the Orsini. The "maybe six, maybe seven" cardinals left in Rome immediately after the death of Celestine IV did not represent a party, but merely those who had not yet decided on what course of action to take. If one adds to these seven named cardinals Jacobus de Pecorara, who was being held by the Emperor, then there was only one cardinal still not present in Anagni: Ricardus Hannibaldi.

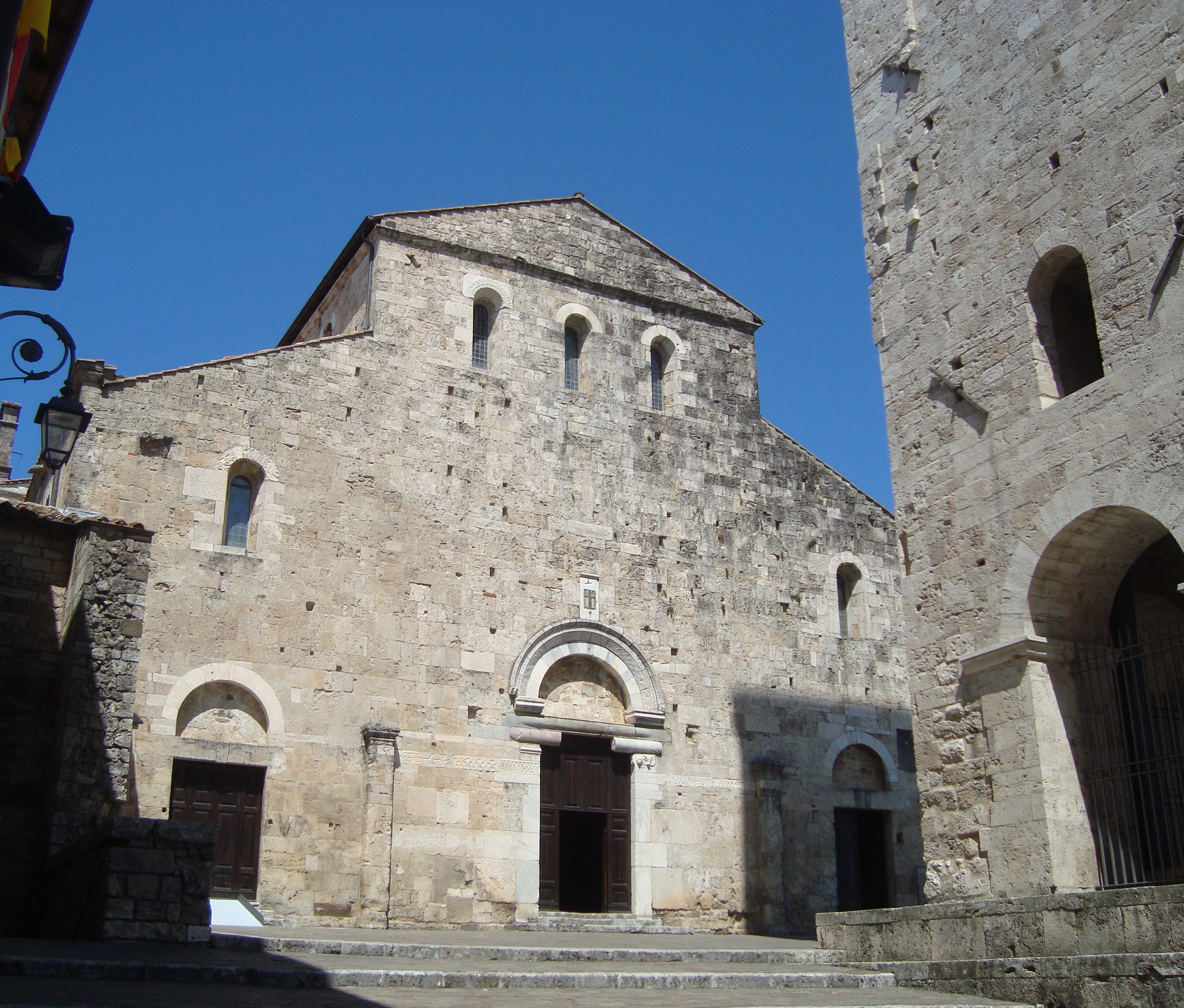
Anagni Cathedral

In February 1243, the Emperor Frederick ordered the mustering of his army for April 1. He met the army at Capua, and in May he headed north toward Rome, where he began to attack and destroy castelli and cause as much destruction as he could. The two cardinals still in Rome fled to Anagni, and now that eight of the cardinals were assembled, they petitioned the Emperor who agreed to their request to return to his kingdom. Frederick then released Cardinal Jacobus de Pecorara, whom he had held prisoner since his capture in the Battle of Giglio in May 1241. In being accommodating, however, King Frederick expected the cardinals to be cooperative and produce a pope. And yet, they refused to start a conclave. Frederick showed his anger by launching his army against Rome. The Romans complained that the failure to elect a pope after so many months was not their fault, but that of the obstinate and quarrelsome cardinals, who were in hiding. Frederick therefore redirected his army toward the estates of the cardinals and of the Church.

== Cardinals ==
Nicolas de Curbio, the biographer of both Gregory IX and Innocent IV, says that it was a year, six months and six days before the cardinals finally sat down together for an Election, in the Cathedral of Anagni. That would be 16 May 1243. There were nine living cardinals:

Elector	Origins	Order	Title	Date of creation	by Pope	Notes
Reynaldus de' Conti	Jenne	Cardinal-bishop	Bishop of Ostia e Velletri	September 18, 1227	Gregory IX	future Pope Alexander IV (1254-1261)
Giacomo da Pecorara, O.Cist.	Piacenza	Cardinal-bishop	Bishop of Palestrina	September 5, 1231	Gregory IX	Prisoner of Frederick II, Holy Roman Emperor. He was released in May, 1243.
Romano Bonaventura	Roman	Cardinal-bishop	Bishop of Porto e Santa Rufina	1216	Innocent III	Not to be confused with Saint Bonaventure, who entered the Franciscan Order in 1243. Cardinal Romano died during the Sede Vacante, on February 21, 1243, before voting began.
Stefano de Normandis dei Conti	Roman	Cardinal-priest	Title of S. Maria in Trastevere	1216	Innocent III	Archpriest of the Vatican Basilica; nephew of Innocent III.
Giovanni Colonna	Roman	Cardinal-priest	Title of S. Prassede	February 18, 1212	Innocent III	The first Colonna cardinal
Sinibaldo Fieschi	Lavagna, Genoa	Cardinal-priest	Title of S. Lorenzo in Lucina	September 18, 1227	Gregory IX	Future Pope Innocent IV
Raniero Capocci, O.Cist.	Todi	Cardinal-deacon	Deacon of S. Maria in Cosmedin	1216	Innocent III	Protodeacon of the Sacred College of Cardinals
Egidius (Gil) Torres	Spanish	Cardinal-deacon	Deacon of Ss. Cosma e Damiano	December, 1216	Honorius III	
Oddone di Monferrato	Montferrat	Cardinal-deacon	Deacon of S. Nicola in Carcere Tulliano	September 18, 1227	Gregory IX	
Riccardo Annibaldi	Roman	Cardinal-deacon	Deacon of S. Angelo in Pescheria	1237	Gregory IX	Rector of Campagna and Marittima; nephew of Cardinal Rinaldo Conti de Segni

== Election of 1243 ==
Romanus Bonaventura, Cardinal Bishop of Porto (1236-1243 died on February 21, 1243. The number of cardinals was reduced to nine. Six cardinals were needed to produce a canonical election.

The Cardinals finally assembled at Anagni Cathedral around May 16, 1243, if Nicolaus de Curbio is accurate. Despite the vicissitudes they had suffered since the death of Gregory IX, and the devastation of the Emperor Frederick's army, it nevertheless took the cardinals over five weeks to choose a pope. Nothing is known about the deliberations during that period, except that they elected Cardinal Sinibaldo Fieschi of Genoa, a relative of the Counts of Lavania, as Pope Innocent IV on June 25, 1243 (Nicholas de Curbio) or on the Feast of St. John the Baptist, June 24 (Matthew of Paris). At the time of the election the Emperor Frederick was at Melfi, where, when he heard the news, he ordered the Te Deum to be sung throughout his kingdom.

Pope Innocent IV was consecrated and crowned on the Sunday following the Feast of St. John the Baptist, June 28. There is no specific testimony, but the right to consecrate the pope belonged to the Bishop of Ostia, Raynaldus dei Conti; and the right to crown him belonged to the senior cardinal-deacon (prior diaconum), the Cistercian Rainerius (Capocci).
