= James of Pecorara =

Italian monk and diplomat

His Eminence James of Pecorara O.Cist.
- Cardinal-Bishop of Palestrina
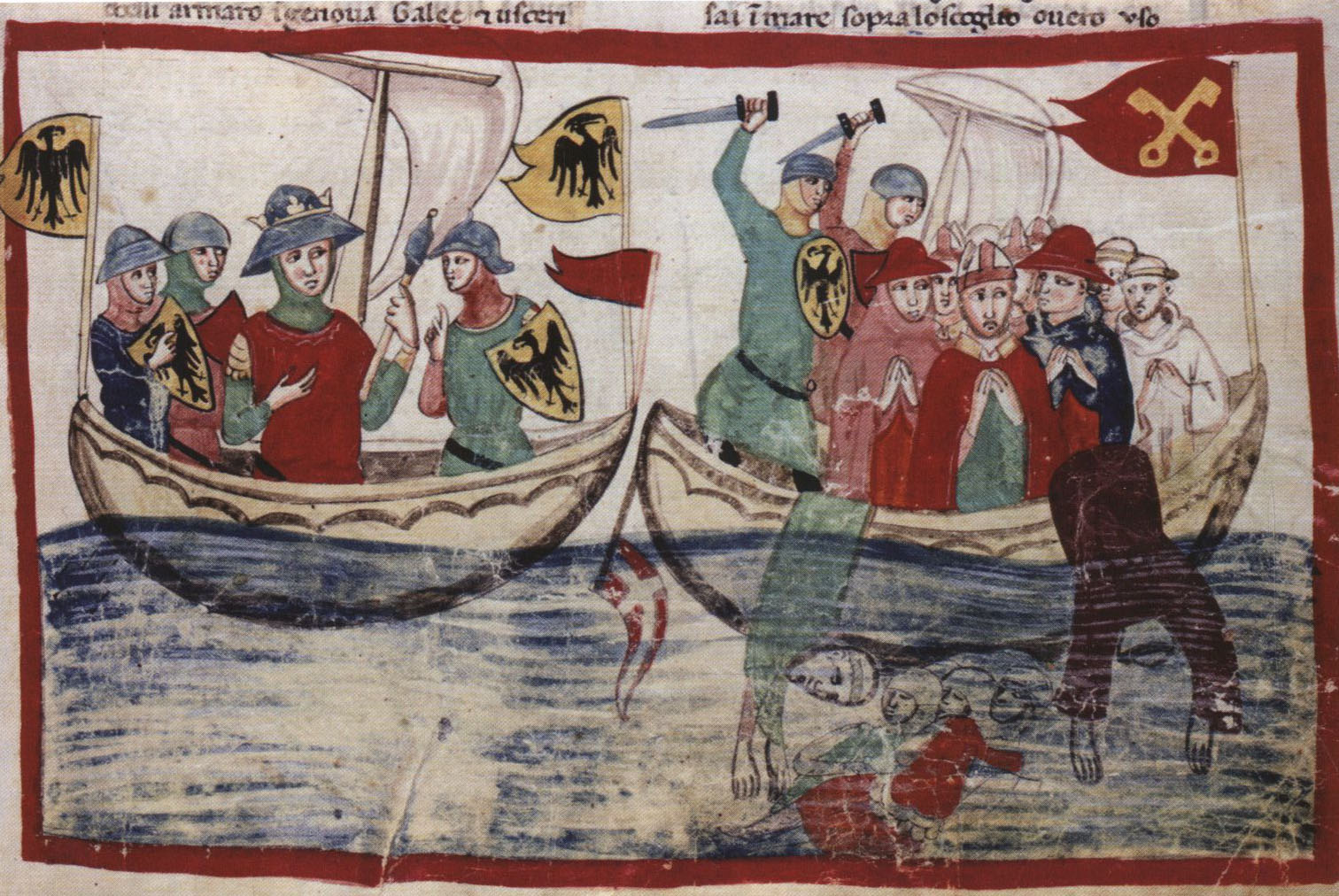
- James of Pecorara and Otto of Tonengo (in cardinal's hats on the ship flying the papal arms) captured at the Battle of Giglio in 1241, from a copy of the Nuova Cronica, 14th century
- Church: Catholic Church
- Appointed: September 1231
- Term ended: June 1244
- Predecessor: Guido II Pierleoni
- Successor: Stephen I Báncsa
- Other posts: Vicar-General of Rome (1238-1244)

Orders
- Created cardinal: September 1231 by Pope Gregory IX
- Rank: Cardinal-Bishop

Personal details
- Born: c. 1170s Pecorara, Italy
- Died: June 1244 Rome, Papal States

James of Pecorara or Giacomo da Pecorara (1170s – June 1244) was an Italian monk, cardinal and diplomat.

James was a cleric in the church of Ravenna before he joined the Cistercians in 1215, becoming abbot of Trois-Fontaines in France in 1223. Created a cardinal by Pope Gregory IX in 1231 and given the diocese of Palestrina, he served as a papal legate in Lombardy (1232), Hungary (1232–1234), Tuscany (1235), Lombardy a second time (1236–1237) and France (1239–1241). He was the vicar of the city of Rome on two occasions (1238–1239, 1243–1244). He was captured by the emperor and imprisoned for two years on account of his efforts towards an anti-imperial alliance (1241–1243).

== Early life ==
James was born between 1170 and 1180. His father was Torniello of Pecorara. His family took its name, de Pecoraria, from their castle at Pecorara in the territory of Piacenza. They belonged to the local elite. James was born either at Cicogni in Pecorara or at Piacenza. He was probably the uncle of Cardinal James of Castell'Arquato. Nothing is known of his education. At some point, he was ordained a priest.

James's first clerical posting was in the church of San Donnino in Piacenza. He was a canon and archdeacon of the cathedral of Ravenna between 1211 and 1219. For reasons unknown, he abandoned the secular clergy and Ravenna to become a Cistercian monk in the abbey of Clairvaux in 1215. In 1223, he was elected abbot of Trois-Fontaines. Pope Honorius III put him in charge of the papal penitentiary and, about 1227, appointed him an auditor of the Roman Rota. In September 1231, Pope Gregory IX named him cardinal-bishop of Palestrina. His first subscription to a document as such is from November 1234.

== Cardinal ==
=== Legatine missions in Italy and Hungary ===
In January 1232, James was named papal legate in northern Italy alongside Otto of Tonengo with the purpose of negotiating a reconciliation between Frederick II, Holy Roman Emperor, and the cities of the Lombard League. The mission was a failure because James chose, out of partiality to his native city, to bring the league's terms to the emperor rather than the emperor's terms to the league. Frederick, who was holding an imperial diet in Ravenna at the time, refused to meet the cardinals and conceived a strong dislike for James.

Shortly before July 1232, James was transferred as legate to Hungary. There his brief was to reconcile King Andrew II and Archbishop Robert of Esztergom, who had excommunicated the king for failing to uphold the Golden Bull of 1231 (itself an expanded version of the Golden Bull of 1222). This mission was more successful than his previous one. In 1233, James forced the Treaty of Bereg on Andrew, meeting all of Robert's demands. By the treaty, Andrew agreed not to employ Jews or Muslims in his financial administration. James was still in Hungary in the spring of 1234. His chaplain, Roger of Torrecuso, chose to remain there.

After Hungary, James worked at the Roman curia for a short period. Around this time, he founded a Cistercian nunnery at Paliano in the diocese of Palestrina. In 1234, he and Cardinal Raniero Capocci were asked by the general chapter of the Cistercian order to curb the luxurious living of certain Cistercians who had become bishops in Italy. In the general chapters of 1238 and 1239, it was ordered that James and Raniero be remembered annually in the order's prayers as a reward for their service.

In 1235, James was sent as a legate to Tuscany, where he arranged a peaceful settlement between the warring cities of Florence, Orvieto and Siena. In June 1236, he was sent for a second time as legate in Lombardy. He was replacing the legate Alberto da Rezzato and his brief was to block the holding of an imperial diet at Piacenza. He successfully brought Piacenza into the Guelph (pro-papal) fold, blocking Frederick's diet. The emperor complained to the pope about James, whom he regarded as an enemy and not a mediator, but the pope was initially unmoved. During his stay in native city, James arranged the election of a Cistercian named Egidio to the curacy of the church of Sant'Antonino. In 1237, he negotiated an alliance between the Papacy and the republics of Genoa and Venice. He then returned to Rome. In February 1237, he was replaced as legate in Lombardy by Cardinals Thomas of Capua and Rainald of Ostia.

=== Mission to France ===
In May 1238, the pope suspended the Inquisition in the lands of Count Raymond VII of Toulouse and nominated James as his legate to lift the latter's excommunication and secure his participation in the planned crusade against Frederick II. Because of the political situation in Italy, James did not immediately leave Rome. In 1239, James was exercising the office of vicarius urbis (papal vicar in Rome). In November, he left on his mission to France to obtain the support of Count Raymond VII and King Louis IX for the crusade against Frederick II. The emperor tried to prevent him from reaching France, but he travelled by sea disguised as a pilgrim. Despite several face-to-face meetings, James was unable to persuade Louis to turn against Frederick.

Without leaving France, he began working the papal alliance with Aragon. In September 1239, he interceded to maintain the alliance between Aragon and Genoa. In October 1239 or 1240, he wrote from Nice to Archbishop Pere d'Albalat detailing Frederick's crimes. He interfered in other Aragonese and Navarrese affairs as well, dealing with an accusation of pluralism against the archdeacon of Aristot and procuring a benefice in Navarre for the brother of the archdeacon of Beauvais. He was still in France in early 1241, when Gregory IX called for a council to meet in Rome at Easter to pass judgement on the emperor. In response, James convoked a council at Meaux, at which he urged the French bishops to accompany him to Rome. Joined by Otto of Tonengo, James and the bishops sailed from Genoa on 25 April in order to avoid Frederick's troops in central Italy.

=== Imprisonment and final years ===
The Genoese fleet was intercepted by the pro-imperial fleet of Pisa and defeated in a battle of Giglio on 3 May 1241. Otto and James were captured and initially imprisoned in Pisa under King Enzo of Sardinia. Frederick hoped to convince the cardinals to intercede with the pope to have his excommunication lifted. After the French bishops were freed, the cardinals were brought to Salerno in the Kingdom of Sicily. Otto reportedly received better treatment than James, perhaps because he was seen as more valuable in negotiations, but probably because Frederick harboured ill-will against him from his two previous legations in Lombardy. After the death of Gregory IX on 22 August 1241, the cardinals were moved to Tivoli. Early in March 1242, they were transferred to Capua in the Kingdom of Sicily. After the death of Gregory's successor, Celestine IV, in April 1242, they were moved back to Tivoli.

Owing to his confinement, James did not take part in the 1241 papal election, which elected Celestine IV. Frederick offered to release both captive cardinals if Otto were elected pope, but the free cardinals refused. Otto was released in the summer of 1242, but James remained a prisoner. Celestine died shortly after his election and the cardinals refused to hold another election until James was released. Frederick refused to release him until Gregorio di Montelongo was removed as legate from Lombardy. By 1243, however, Frederick was seen throughout Europe as responsible for maintaining the papal vacancy. Finally, through the intervention of the Emperor Baldwin II of Constantinople, James was released in May 1243 just in time to take part in the May–June 1243 papal election. His first subscription after his liberation was on 23 September 1243. The new pope, Innocent IV, immediately appointed James for a second term as vicarius urbis and left Rome for France. James was welcomed by the Romans, who described him as an angel descended from heaven. James's last subscription as a cardinal is dated 26 April 1244. He died in Rome in June, probably on 25 June, and was buried in Clairvaux in accordance with his will. His head and a finger, however, were inurned in the cathedral of Piacenza.

== Bibliography ==
- Aavitsland, Kristin B. (2012). Imagining the Human Condition in Medieval Rome: The Cistercian Fresco Cycle at Abbazia delle Tre Fontane. Ashgate.
- Abulafia, David (1988). Frederick II: A Medieval Emperor. Allen Lane.
- Almási, Tibor (1989). "Pecorari Jakab bíboros diplomáciai pályája [The Diplomatic Career of Cardinal James of Pecorara]". In Kulcsár, Péter; Mader, Béla; Monok, István (eds.). Tanulmányok Karácsonyi Béla hetvenedik születésnapjára (in Hungarian). JATE Központi Könyvtár, JATE BTK Magyar Történeti Intézet. pp. 59–69. ISBN 978-963-4818-18-2.
- Almási, Tibor (1993). "Egy ciszterci bíboros a pápai világhatalom szolgálatában. Pecorari Jakab magyarországi legációja [Cistercian Cardinal in the Service of the Papal World-Power. The Legateship of Jacob Pecorari in Hungary]". Magyar Egyháztörténeti Vázlatok (in Hungarian). 5 (1–2): 129–141. ISSN 0865-5227.
- Bak, János M.; Rady, Martyn (2010). "Introduction". Master Roger's Epistle to the Sorrowful Lament upon the Destruction of the Kingdom of Hungary by the Tatars. Central European University Press. pp. xli–liii. ISBN 9789639776951. JSTOR 10.7829/j.ctt2jbnhk.9.
- Carpegna Falconieri, Tommaso di (2005). "Giacomo di Palestrina". Enciclopedia Federiciana. Istituto dell'Enciclopedia Italiana.
- Engel, Pál (2001). Realm of St. Stephen: A History of Medieval Hungary, 895–1526. Translated by Tamás Pálosfalvi. I. B. Tauris.
- Gardoni, Giuseppe (2015). "Pecorara, Giacomo". Dizionario Biografico degli Italiani (in Italian). Vol. 82: Pazzi–Pia. Rome: Istituto dell'Enciclopedia Italiana. ISBN 978-88-12-00032-6.
- Linehan, Peter (1971). The Spanish Church and the Papacy in the Thirteenth Century. Cambridge University Press.
- Lomax, John Phillip (1996). "Frederick II, His Saracens, and the Papacy". In John Victor Tolan (ed.). Medieval Christian Perceptions of Islam: A Book of Essays. Routledge. pp. 175–197.
- Mihalache, Robert-Marius (2021). "The Implications for Transylvania of Cardinal Jacob of Preneste's Legation (1232–1234)". Transylvanian Review. 30 (2): 43–55. doi:10.33993/TR.2021.2.04. S2CID 239693355.
- Miranda, Salvador (2018) [1998]. "Biographical Dictionary: Pope Gregory IX (1227–1241) — Consistory of September 1231 (III) — Celebrated in Rieti". The Cardinals of the Holy Roman Church. Florida International University Libraries. s.v. PECORARA, O.Cist., Giacomo da.
- Raccagni, Gianluca (2016). "The Crusade Against Frederick II: A Neglected Piece of Evidence" (PDF). The Journal of Ecclesiastical History. 67 (4): 721–740. doi:10.1017/S002204691600066X.
- Silanos, Pietro (2014). "Ottone da Tonengo". Dizionario Biografico degli Italiani (in Italian). Vol. 80: Ottone–Pansa. Rome: Istituto dell'Enciclopedia Italiana. ISBN 978-88-12-00032-6.
- Wakefield, Walter L. (1974). Heresy, Crusade, and Inquisition in Southern France, 1100–1250. University of California Press.
