= 1241 papal election =

Election of Catholic Pope Celestine IV

Papal election 1241

Dates and location
- 21 September – 25 October 1241; Septasolium, Rome

Key officials
- Protodeacon: Rainiero Capocci

Elected pope
- Goffredo Castiglioni; Name taken: Celestine IV

The 1241 papal election (21 September to 25 October) saw the election of Cardinal Goffredo Castiglioni as Pope Celestine IV. The election took place during the first of many protracted sede vacantes of the Middle Ages, and like many of them was characterized by disputes between popes and the Holy Roman Emperor. Specifically, the election took place during the war between Frederick II, Holy Roman Emperor and the Lombard League and deceased pontiff, Pope Gregory IX, with Italy divided between pro-Papal and pro-Imperial factions known as the Guelphs and Ghibellines.

During the sede vacante, Frederick II surrounded Rome with his armies, blocking the arrival of some cardinal electors known to be hostile to his interests. Unable to reach a consensus, the cardinals were locked in a monastery called the Septasolium (corrupted in both medieval and modern narratives into Septizodium) by the Roman civic officials, eventually settling on one of their oldest and most feeble members. The conditions within the building were believed to have contributed to the death of one of the papabile and even to the death of Celestine IV soon after the election. Following Celestine IV's death, the war on the peninsula resumed and the cardinals dispersed for over a year and a half before coming together in Anagni to elect Pope Innocent IV.

The forced sequestration of the cardinals during the election was historically significant, and—along with other papal elections of the 13th century—contributed to the development of the papal conclave.

== Context ==
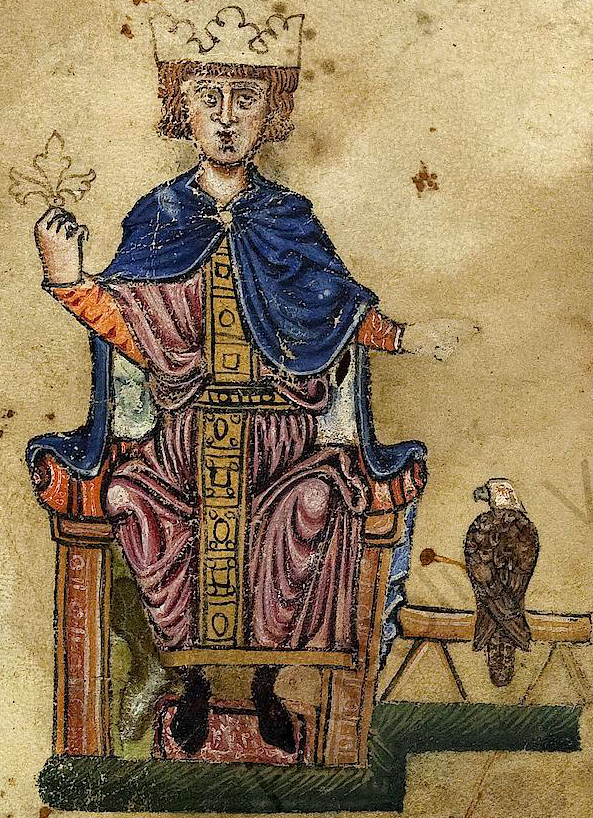
The cardinals were divided into factions for and against Emperor Frederick II.

The papacy of Pope Gregory IX (1227–1241) and the kingship of Frederick II, Holy Roman Emperor took place at a time when centuries-old disputes between the popes and emperors were coming to a head. Frederick II had dedicated troops, but not his own leadership, to the failed Fifth Crusade, to the dismay of the church; following his marriage to Isabella II of Jerusalem, he took up the Sixth Crusade but later abandoned it and returned to Italy, for a variety of political, economic, and military reasons. This served as a pretext for his excommunication by Gregory IX, and thinly veiled skirmishes between supporters of the pope and emperor (Guelphs and Ghibellines, respectively) throughout the Italian peninsula, particularly in Lombardy. Before his death, Gregory IX had called for a synod to denounce Frederick II, and the emperor had gone to great lengths to disrupt the gathering, including the imprisonment of captured prelates and cardinals.

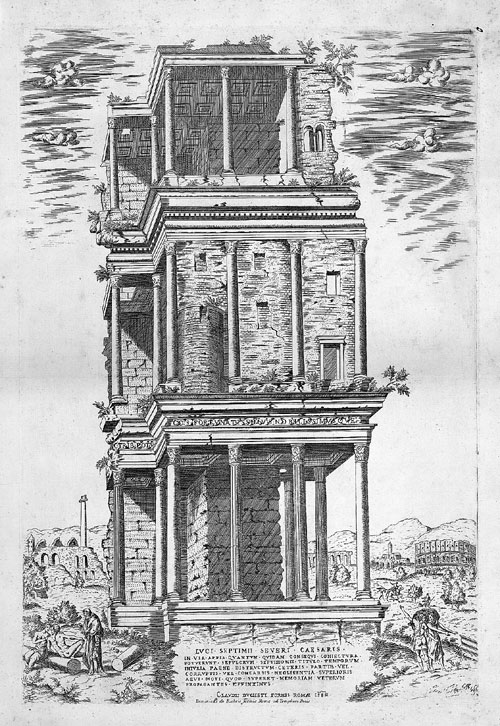
A fragment of the Septizodium, an ancient nymphaeum, in a 1582 engraving

The conclave took place under the threat of the surrounding army of Frederick II, Holy Roman Emperor—before he pulled back to Apulia: Frederick II's retreat was meant to show that the Emperor "had made war with Gregory IX, and not with the Church"—who had been at odds with Gregory IX and then Celestine IV. Two cardinals had been sent to England (Oddo de Monferrato) and France (Giacomo da Pecorara, OCist.), in order to rally bishops and other prelates to attend Pope Gregory's Council. Since Frederick and his army held the Lombard plain and Tuscany, travelers would have to take the sea route. A navy was assembled by the two cardinals at Nice and Genoa, and despite warnings from the Genoese, they insisted on setting sail. They were met by Frederick's fleet off the tiny island of Giglio on 3 May 1241. They were sent to imprisonment in the Kingdom of Naples. The election took place in the Saepta Solis ('enclosure of the Sun') near the Clivus Scauri, an ancient complex that had been turned into a monastery. The cardinals were confined by Senator Matteo Rosso Orsini, the father of Giovanni Caetano Orsini (Pope Nicholas III), who had been appointed to his office by Pope Gregory IX. The conditions of the election were reported—by a contemporary author hostile to the Orsini—to have been stressful, with the urine of Orsini's guards on the rooftop leaking into the election chamber along with the rain. The actual forced confinement to the Saepta Solis took place only for the last two weeks of the conclave. It is even alleged that the citizens of Rome, angered by rumors that a non-Cardinal would be elected, threatened to dig up the corpse of Pope Gregory IX and place it in the Saepta Solis with the cardinals. A different account states that Orsini himself threatened to have the corpse exhumed and displayed publicly in full papal regalia.

== Cardinal electors ==
According to different accounts, the College of Cardinals on the death of Gregory IX numbered between 12 and 14 cardinals. The number of cardinal electors who actually voted in the final scrutiny was only 10. At the time of Gregory IX's death, most of the cardinal electors who took part in the election were already present in Rome, and the two cardinals held prisoner by Frederick II were already captive in Naples. The two cardinals had been apprehended at sea aboard captured Genoese galleys, while traveling to a general council that Gregory IX had called for Easter 1241 to denounce Frederick II. Cardinal Colonna, however, was on one of his country estates near Palestrina when the Pope died. He had had a nasty fight with Gregory IX, and withdrew from the Curia. On his estate he had been holding consultations with the Emperor Frederick. When Gregory died, the Emperor, who was with his army at Grottaferrata, gave permission (licentia) for all cardinals outside Rome to return.

Elector	Origins	Order	Title	Date of creation	by Pope	Notes
Raynalo dei Conti di Jenne	Jenne	Cardinal-bishop	Bishop of Ostia e Velletri	18 September 1227	Gregory IX	future Pope Alexander IV
Romano Bonaventura	Roman	Cardinal-bishop	Bishop of Porto e Santa Rufina	1216	Innocent III	Not to be confused with the contemporary Saint Bonaventure
Goffredo Castiglioni	Milan	Cardinal-bishop	Bishop of Sabina	18 September 1227	Gregory IX	Elected Pope Celestine IV
Stefano de Normandis dei Conti	Roman	Cardinal-priest	Title of S. Maria in Trastevere	1216	Innocent III	Archpriest of the Vatican Basilica; nephew of Innocent III
Giovanni Colonna	Roman	Cardinal-priest	Title of S. Prassede	18 February 1212	Innocent III	The first Colonna cardinal
Sinibaldo Fieschi	Lavagna, Genoa	Cardinal-priest	Title of S. Lorenzo in Lucina	18 September 1227	Gregory IX	Future Pope Innocent IV
Rainiero Capocci, O.Cist.	Todi	Cardinal-deacon	Deacon of S. Maria in Cosmedin	1216	Innocent III	Protodeacon of the Sacred College of Cardinals
Gil Torres	Spanish	Cardinal-deacon	Deacon of Ss. Cosma e Damiano	December, 1216	Honorius III	
Riccardo Annibaldi	Roman	Cardinal-deacon	Deacon of S. Angelo in Pescheria	1237	Gregory IX	Rector of Campagna and Marittima; nephew of Cardinal Rinaldo Conti de Segni
Robert Somercotes	English	Cardinal-deacon	Deacon of S. Eustachio	1238	Gregory IX	Died during the sede vacante on 26 September 1241

=== Absent cardinals ===
Elector	Origins	Order	Title	Date of creation	by Pope	Notes
Giacomo da Pecorara, O.Cist.	Piacenza	Cardinal-bishop	Bishop of Palestrina	5 September 1231	Gregory IX	Prisoner of Frederick II, Holy Roman Emperor
Oddone di Monferrato	Montferrat	Cardinal-deacon	Deacon of S. Nicola in Carcere Tulliano	18 September 1227	Gregory IX	Prisoner of Frederick II, Holy Roman Emperor; allowed to join the election late, but returned to prison before the election.
Tommaso da Capua	Capua	Cardinal-priest	Title of S. Sabina	1216	Innocent III	Penitentiary and protopriest of the Sacred College; his participation is disputed because sources indicate that he died in 1239.
Peter of Capua the Younger	Amalfi	Cardinal-deacon	Deacon of S. Girogio in Velabro	1219	Honorius III	He may have died ca. 1236–1241.

== Proceedings ==
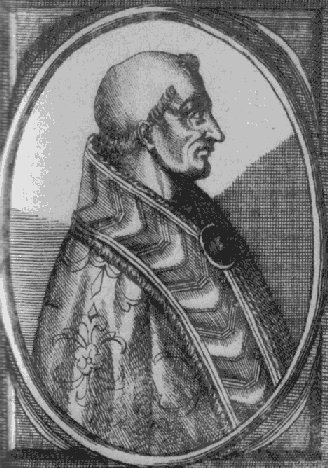
Goffredo Castiglioni, elected Pope Celestine IV

The main faction of cardinals was composed of the Gregorians (Rinaldo Conti de Segni, Sinibaldo Fieschi, and Riccardo Annibaldi, who supported the election of Romano Bonaventura), who wished to continue Gregory IX's hostility towards the Holy Roman Emperor. Frederick II naturally objected to the election of Cardinal Romano Bonaventura due to his "persecution" of the University of Paris while legate to France, his alleged debauching of Queen Blanche of Castile, and his role in the dispute between Gregory IX and the emperor. The majority, however, including the "Moderates of the Opposition", including Giovanni Colonna, Robert Somercotes, and Rainiero Capocci, supported Cardinal Goffredo Castiglioni, who advised a policy of dealing with Frederick.

When neither side was able to reach a two-thirds majority, required by the Constitution of Alexander III, the cardinals wrote to Frederick II and requested him to release the two cardinals whom he held captive. After the conclave had begun, the Emperor Frederick had had the two cardinals brought from Naples to Tivoli. However, when summoned to the Emperor's presence, rather than agree to the Emperor's conditions, Cardinal Giacomo da Pecorara proceeded to excommunicate the Emperor yet once again. It was clear that the Cardinal would never cooperate, and he therefore remained in detention for two more years. Cardinal Oddone di Monferrato, however, was allowed to join the election, though he was required to leave hostages in his place and to promise to return to the Emperor's custody, unless he himself was elected pope or the deadlock continued. Frederick did not expect, of course, that the cardinals would elect Cardinal Oddo as pope; Frederick's own friends in the Conclave could and would prevent that. Nor did he want Cardinal Oddo to be elected. His real opinion of the Cardinal is revealed in a letter he wrote after the Battle of Giglio: as a Legate in England and France Oddo had conspired a good deal against the honor of the Emperor; he had raised a crowd of prelates to bring them to Rome to participate in Gregory IX's Council; in Genoa he had conspired against those Genoese who were supporters of Frederick; he had raised and armed a fleet to transport the prelates to Rome, and to reduce the Genoese. Cardinal Oddo was to be an instrument to break the deadlock in the meeting. Frederick II himself urged the cardinals to make a quick choice.

Like serpents you cling to the earth instead of raising yourself to the skies. Each of you is aiming at the tiara, and no one of you is willing to leave it to the other. Renounce the spirit of faction and of discord! Let the college of cardinals give by unanimous choice to Christendom a pope who will satisfy us and the empire, and whose election will be for the universal good.

The Emperor then, in September, returned to his kingdom by way of Campania, leaving the two cardinals at Tivoli under the custody of Tybboldus de Dragone.

The heat and shortage of food may have contributed to the death of Cardinal Somercotes, although the other members of the pro-Imperial faction alleged that he had been poisoned. Cardinal Fieschi's health also deteriorated severely, apparently causing the future pope to inch closer to death. The remainder of the cardinals were not allowed to leave the Septisolium for the funeral, nor were physicians or servants allowed to enter the building (where a sizable amount of excrement had begun to build up). Bonaventura would also die some sixteen months after the election, which the vivid narrations gratuitously attribute to the effects of the Election.

Cardinal Castiglione's advanced age and deteriorating health are thought to have contributed both to his status as papabile and his ultimate election, making him an ideal compromise candidate, "stop-gap", or "provisional Pope". More polemical sources describe Celestine IV as a "feeble, ignorant, old fanatic" who was "destitute of any other qualification". One commentator suggested that the cardinals "escaped by electing a dying man". Still others refer to him as "Orsini's candidate".

== Aftermath ==
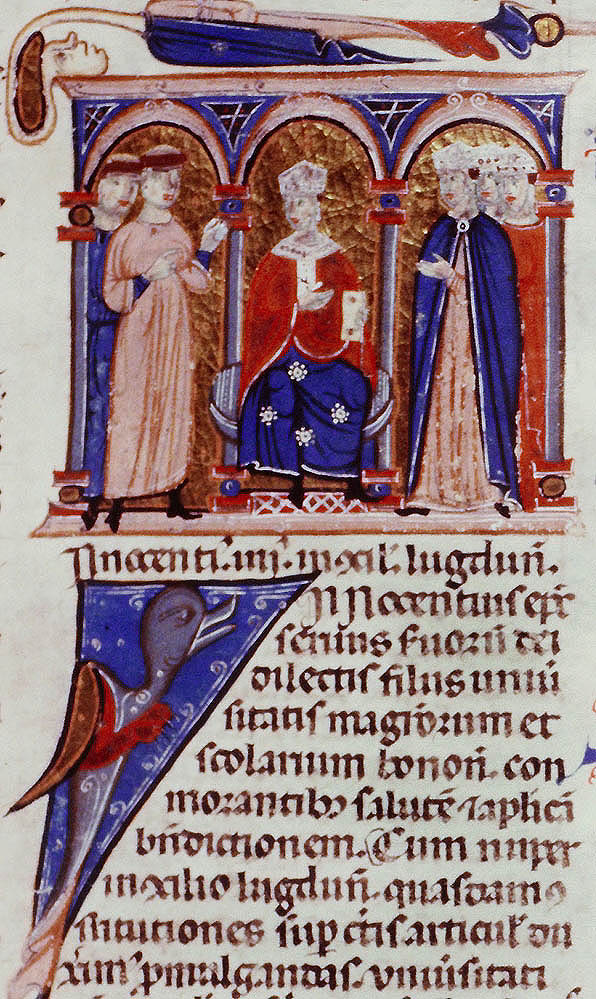
Fieschi was later elected Innocent IV...

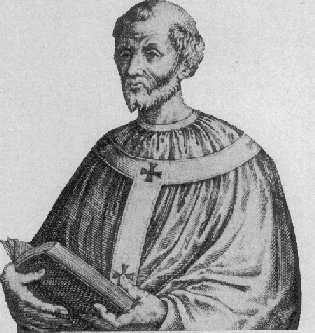
...then Conti as Alexander IV; both were members of the Gregorian faction opposed to Frederick II.

Celestine IV died on Sunday, 10 November 1241, just 17 days after his election, even before he had been enthroned. It is possible that the cause of death was dysentery, contracted in the Septasolium (Saepta Solis). It is speculated that had Celestine IV lived longer he "would in all likelihood have proven friendly to the emperor".

Pope Celestine was buried on the day after his death, according to the custom. But, even before the funeral, certain cardinals fled the city, and headed for Anagni, the home of Cardinal Rinaldo dei Conti di Segni. It is said (by Matthew of Paris) that only six or seven cardinals were left in the city. Cardinal Colonna, however, was seized by the Roman populace, who supported the Orsini, and imprisoned due to his association with King Frederick.

When confronted by a group of begging friars bearing a message from the Archbishop of York and Bishop of Lincoln, Frederick II reportedly said: "Who is hindering the welfare of the Church? Not I; but the stubborn pride and greediness of Romans. Who can wonder if I withstand the English and Roman Churches, which excommunicate me [as Oddone had done from England], defame me, and are always pouring forth money to do me wrong?" Soon after the conclave, the hostilities between the Guelphs and Ghibellines resumed around the Italian Peninsula, on both land and sea. Although Frederick II was now free to crush the Lombards without a pope to oppose him, he soon diverted much of his cavalry and infantry north of the Alps where the Tartars had begun to seriously threaten his lands.

Thus began the longest sede vacante in the history of the Roman Catholic Church since the period between Pope Agatho and Pope Leo II (681-682). It took a year and a half before the cardinals were successful in reconvening in Anagni (Frederick II was in possession of Rome) and electing a successor to Celestine IV, due in no small part to Frederick II's continuing to keep da Pecorara and Oddone as hostages: choosing Cardinal Fieschi as Pope Innocent IV in 1243. Innocent IV breathed new life into the conflict against Frederick II, and after the emperor's death in 1250, excommunicated his son and heir, Conrad IV of Germany. Imperial influence in papal elections persisted until the papal election, 1268–1271, after which the Imperial party (then composed mostly of older cardinals) was all but extinguished within the College of Cardinals.

== Problematical Accounts ==
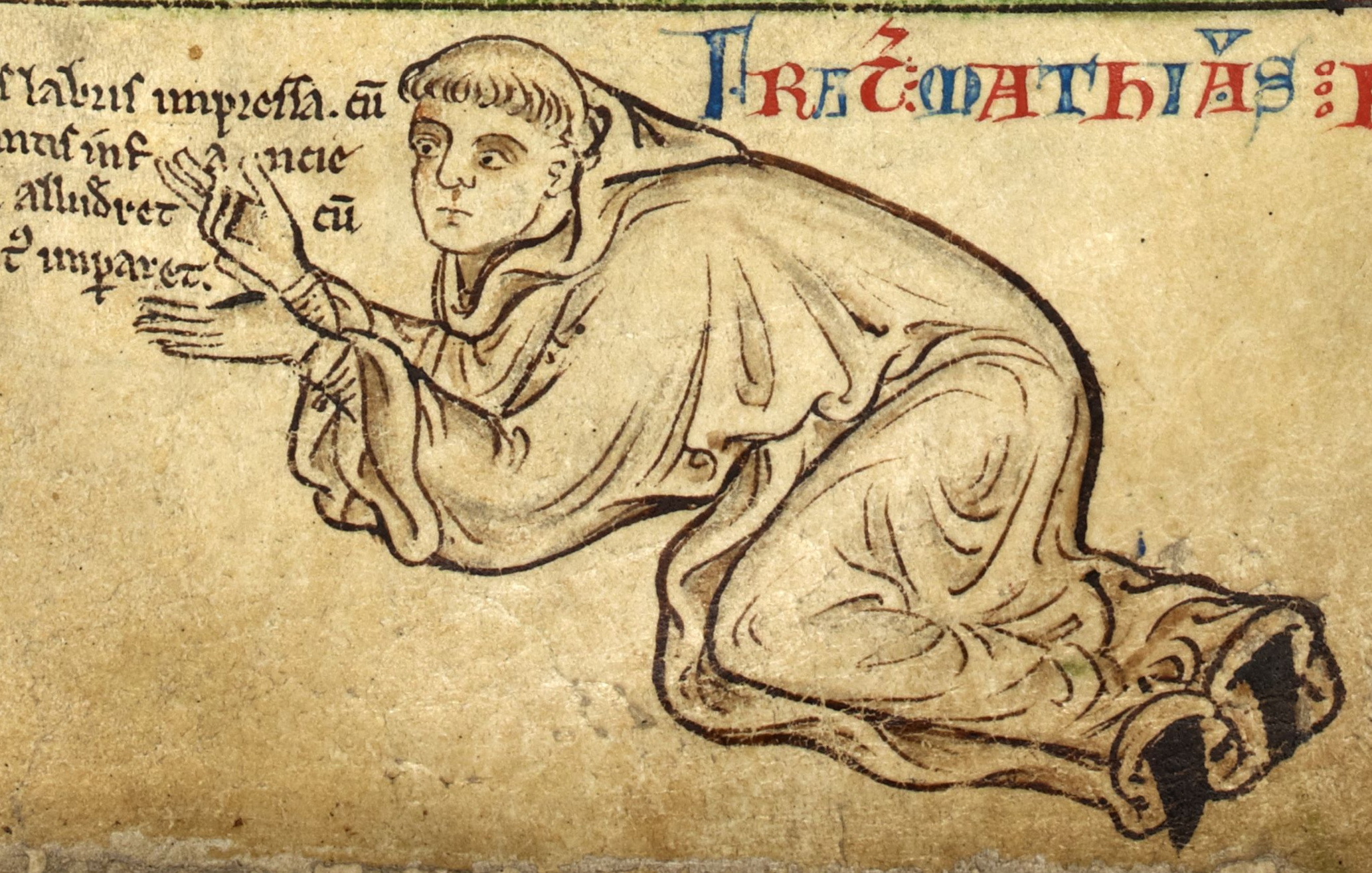
Self-portrait of Matthew Paris, a contemporary chronicler of the election

One contemporary account of mixed reliability is that of British chronicler Matthew Paris (c. 1200–1259), who claims that both his compatriot, Robert Somercotes, and Celestine IV died of poisoning; his works are more prized for their accounts of the Hohenstaufen struggles. Matthew was a friend of Cardinal Somercotes (who had once presided over the audientia litterarum contradictarum in Rome), and further claimed that Somercotes would have soon been elected pope himself had he survived. Such speculation appears from time to time in English literature; e.g. "the Italians were too hard for the honest Englishman, being made away by poison at the Holy Conclave, 1241," but it can be safely ignored. Accusations of poisoning of popes and cardinals, such as Innocent V and Adrian V, are a regular feature of chronicles in the 13th and 14th century.

== Legacy ==
By virtue of the cardinals being locked in, the election is sometimes referred to as the "first conclave" (even the "first formal papal Conclave"), although the formal procedures of the conclave were not developed until after the papal election, 1268–1271, in the Constitution "Ubi Periculum" of Pope Gregory X (1274). Its provisions were first implemented in the papal conclave, January 1276. In fact, the practice of seclusion of the cardinal electors can perhaps even be traced back to the papal election, 1216, where the people of Perugia locked in the cardinals after the death of Pope Innocent III.
