= Cardinals created by Gregory IX =

Catholic appointments from 1227 to 1239

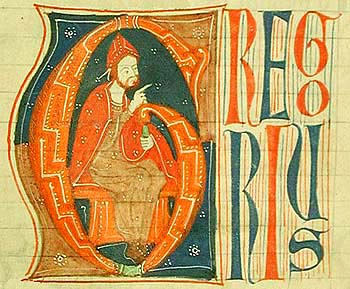
Pope Gregory IX, 13th century manuscript

Pope Gregory IX (r. 1227–1241) created sixteen cardinals in five consistories that he held throughout his pontificate. This included three future successors (Celestine IV, Innocent IV, and Alexander IV) in the first allocation in 1227.

== 18 September 1227 ==
- Jean Halgrin O.S.B. Clun.
- Goffredo Castiglioni
- Rinaldo Conti di Segni
- Sinibaldo Fieschi
- Barthélemy
- Otto of Tonengo

== December 1228 ==
- Jacques de Vitry Can. Reg. O.S.A.
- Niccolò dei Conti di Segni

== September 1231 ==
- Giacomo da Pecorara O.Cist.
- Simon de Sully
- Raymond de Pons

== 1237 ==
- Riccardo Annibaldi
- François Cassard
- Guy

== 1239 ==
- Robert Somercotes
- St. Ramón Nonato O. de M.

== Sources ==
- Miranda, Salvador. "Consistories for the creation of Cardinals 13th Century (1198-1303): Gregory IX (1227-1241)". The Cardinals of the Holy Roman Church. Florida International University. OCLC 53276621.
