= Blockade of Rome (1241) =

1241 imperial blockade and campaign against Rome

- Part of the Guelph–Ghibelline conflict and the conflict between Frederick II and Pope Gregory IX
Date	July – September 1241
Location	Rome, Tivoli and surrounding Lazio, Papal States
Result	Inconclusive: Imperial forces establish positions around Rome; Papal–Roman forces retain control of the city; Imperial forces withdraw from the Roman countryside

Belligerents
Holy Roman Empire; Kingdom of Sicily: Colonna family; Imperial-aligned towns and castles of Lazio and Umbria	Papacy; Rome: Orsini family; Papal-aligned Roman aristocracy and civic militia

Commanders and leaders
Frederick II; Giovanni Colonna	Pope Gregory IX †; Matteo Rosso Orsini

Strength
10,000–12,000: German, Sicilian and Lombard cavalry and infantry; Forces of imperial-aligned towns and baronial families	6,000: Roman civic militia; Orsini and papal-aligned baronial contingents

Casualties and losses
500–700 killed, wounded or captured	300–600 killed, wounded or captured

The Blockade of Rome was an imperial campaign against Rome and the surrounding territories of the Papal States from July to September 1241, during the renewed conflict between Emperor Frederick II and Pope Gregory IX. After the capture of a papal-bound fleet at the Battle of Giglio and the continuing expansion of imperial authority through central Italy, Frederick moved south with a large army in an attempt to place direct military pressure upon the pope and bring their prolonged confrontation to a negotiated conclusion on favourable terms.

Frederick advanced through Umbria and established himself first around Tivoli, Palestrina and later Grottaferrata, while his ally Cardinal Giovanni Colonna secured important positions in the Roman countryside. Imperial troops devastated hostile estates, castles and ecclesiastical properties, but the emperor refrained from attempting a direct storming of Rome. The city remained under the control of the senator Matteo Rosso Orsini, whose destruction of the principal Colonna stronghold inside Rome denied the imperial party an important internal base. Gregory's death on 21 August transformed the political situation, and Frederick ultimately withdrew from the Roman countryside in September without securing the city's submission.

== Background ==
The blockade formed part of the increasingly expansive war between Frederick II and Gregory IX following the emperor's second excommunication in 1239. Frederick had progressively shifted the centre of his military effort from Lombardy toward the Papal States, seeking to break the territorial and political network upon which Gregory depended. By 1240 imperial influence had spread across large parts of central Italy. Viterbo, Foligno, Tivoli, Spello, Orte, Civita Castellana, Sutri, Montefiascone and other centres had accepted Frederick's authority or entered his political orbit, threatening to isolate Rome within a widening belt of imperial-controlled territory.

The political struggle inside Rome itself was equally important. Giovanni Colonna, one of the leading cardinals and a member of the powerful Colonna family, broke with Gregory and increasingly aligned himself with Frederick. The Colonna possessed extensive estates and fortresses southeast of Rome, including Palestrina, giving Frederick an important network of allies close to the city. Their Roman rivals, the Orsini, were led politically by Matteo Rosso Orsini, who as senator exercised strong influence over the civic government and remained firmly committed to resistance.

The strategic balance shifted further after Giglio in May 1241, where the imperial-Pisan fleet intercepted the Genoese convoy carrying prelates toward Gregory's proposed council. The resulting capture of numerous senior churchmen strengthened Frederick's bargaining position and encouraged him to turn directly toward Rome. His objective was broader than the physical occupation of the city. Military pressure was intended to force Gregory and the College of Cardinals toward a settlement in which the emperor could dictate the terms of reconciliation. This was part of a consistent general imperial attempt to use force for a political end, combining military intimidation with negotiation rather than treating conquest as an end in itself.

== Blockade around Rome ==
In the first days of July Frederick left northern Italy accompanied by German, southern Italian and Lombard cavalry and infantry. He advanced through the Marches and Umbria, passing hostile Assisi while receiving the submission of Spoleto, Todi and Terni. Rieti remained hostile and was bypassed. By the beginning of August Frederick had reached Tivoli, whose longstanding imperial sympathies provided him with a secure base little more than a day's march from Rome.

Giovanni Colonna meanwhile operated from Palestrina and brought several important strongpoints in the surrounding countryside into the imperial camp. Stürner records that Frederick then used Palestrina and later Grottaferrata as bases from which to pressure Rome and the papal party. Imperial troops seized or destroyed castles, towers and palaces belonging to hostile Roman nobles, churches and monasteries, devastated their lands and burned abandoned settlements. The imperial chancery presented Rome as effectively encircled, with hostile camps surrounding the city and the emperor's army close enough to threaten it directly.

Frederick nevertheless avoided an assault upon the walls. Rome was a vast and strongly fortified city, and a direct attack would have required a costly commitment with uncertain prospects. It also carried considerable political danger: a violent storming of the seat of the papacy could have handed Gregory a powerful propaganda weapon and undermined Frederick's claim that military pressure was intended to compel peace. His operational method therefore relied upon positional pressure, devastation of hostile property and exploitation of aristocratic factionalism rather than an immediate attempt at urban conquest.

Matteo Rosso Orsini answered this strategy inside the city. At the beginning of August he led the Roman civic militia against the fortified Colonna positions centred around the Mausoleum of Augustus. The strongpoints were captured, depriving the pro-imperial faction of its principal base within the Aurelian Walls. Outside Rome, however, imperial operations continued. The army moved through Colonna territory and attacked papal-aligned castles and estates, while Frederick maintained enough pressure to leave Gregory and his supporters increasingly isolated. The result was a military-political standoff: Frederick dominated much of the countryside and possessed the stronger field army, but Matteo Rosso retained control of Rome and denied him the internal collapse upon which an economical imperial entry into the city would have depended.

== Aftermath ==
The situation changed abruptly when Gregory IX died on 21 August 1241. Frederick's military position around Rome now gave him considerable leverage over the papal succession. The surviving cardinals were divided between men who favoured continued resistance and those seeking a settlement with the emperor, while several important members of the college were still imperial prisoners following Giglio. Frederick hoped that Gregory's successor would adopt a more conciliatory policy and openly presented his advance on Rome as a means of ending the conflict between empire and papacy. From Grottaferrata he expressed the hope that a new pope committed to peace and justice might rapidly restore concord and allow the Christian powers to turn their attention toward the Mongol threat.

The emperor's position was formidable, but it was not unlimited. Matteo Rosso continued to dominate the Roman government, and the city's population did not abandon the papal cause. At the same time, maintaining a large army in the Roman countryside placed growing pressure upon imperial finances and supply arrangements. Frederick therefore had little incentive to launch a bloody assault on Rome when the death of Gregory appeared to offer the possibility of obtaining his political objectives through the election of a more accommodating pope. Frederick withdrew his main army from the vicinity of Rome in September, presenting the move as a gesture intended to permit the cardinals to elect freely. The city itself thus remained outside imperial control. Matteo Rosso exerted intense pressure upon the conclave, and on 25 October the cardinals elected the elderly Goffredo da Castiglione as Pope Celestine IV. His pontificate lasted only seventeen days, after which the papal throne again fell vacant.

Strategically, the blockade demonstrated the extraordinary extent of Frederick's position in central Italy in 1241. Much of the territory surrounding Rome had either submitted or was exposed to imperial attack, while the capture of the prelates at Giglio and the Colonna alliance allowed Frederick to exert simultaneous military and political pressure upon the papacy. Yet Rome itself proved the hard core of resistance. The strength of its walls, the continuing cohesion of the Roman civic militia and Matteo Rosso's control of the city's factional politics prevented imperial superiority in the countryside from becoming possession of the capital. Frederick's decision to avoid a direct assault was strategically intelligent and prudent: his wider aim was to compel a favourable political settlement while preserving his army and avoiding the immense diplomatic cost of storming Rome. The campaign nevertheless ended without a definitive settlement, leaving the central question of papal-imperial relations unresolved and setting the stage for renewed confrontation after the long vacancy preceding the election of Pope Innocent IV in 1243.

== Sources ==
- Abulafia, David (1988). Frederick II: A Medieval Emperor. London: Allen Lane. ISBN 9780713990041.
- Grillo, Paolo (2023). Federico II: La guerra, le città e l'Impero. Milan: Mondadori. ISBN 978-88-04-76912-5.
- Stürner, Wolfgang (2000). Friedrich II. Teil 2: Der Kaiser 1220–1250. Darmstadt: Primus Verlag. ISBN 978-3-534-12229-5.
- Van Cleve, Thomas Curtis (1972). The Emperor Frederick II of Hohenstaufen: Immutator Mundi. Oxford: Clarendon Press.
