= John Halgren of Abbeville =

French scholastic theologian and cleric

John Halgren of Abbeville (c. 1180 – 28 September 1237) was a French scholastic theologian and cleric. He served successively as a university professor, priest, prior, archbishop, cardinal, apostolic legate and diplomat.

John was born around 1180 in Abbeville, the son of Gui d'Abbeville and Ide de Boubers. His father's name is sometimes given as Girard or Guillaume. He may have entered the Abbey of Cluny. He studied at the University of Paris alongside the future Pope Gregory IX. He earned a master of theology degree. He taught theology there in 1217. He was a follower of Peter the Chanter and Stephen Langton. He was a canon and dean of the chapter of Amiens Cathedral from 27 October 1218 until April 1225. Continuing his engagement with the cathedral beyond 1225, he founded the cathedral's first chapel in 1233 and dedicated to the Conversion of Saint Paul. He had also served as the prior of Saint-Pierre d'Abbeville and the cantor of Saint-Vulfran d'Abbeville before 1217.

John became archbishop of Besançon in March 1225. He was consecrated by the cardinal legate Romano Bonaventura on 19 October 1225 in Reims. On 23 December 1226, he was offered the Latin patriarchate of Constantinople, but refused it on grounds of health. In the consistory of 18 September 1227, he was created cardinal by Gregory IX with the titulus of the diocese of Sabina.

John subscribed his first papal bull on 23 September 1227. He visited the kingdoms of the Iberian peninsula, including Portugal, as papal legate between 22 February 1228 and 3 January 1230. There he preached the crusades, held a synod in Lleida in 1229 and determined the boundary between the dioceses of Sigüenza and Osma. In Iberia, he met Raymond of Penyafort. John may have become dean of the Sacred College in January 1230, as the most senior cardinal-bishop after the death of Pelayo Gaitán.

John is sometimes said to have been one of the papal negotiators, alongside Thomas of Capua, in the talks with Emperor Frederick II that resulted in the Treaty of San Germano (1230) and ended the War of the Keys. Between 1230 and 1233, John was with the Roman Curia. In 1234, he and Cardinal Peter of Capua were sent on a diplomatic mission to Frederick II.

John subscribed his last papal bull on 25 August 1237. He died in Rome on 28 September 1237 after a long illness. He left behind four books containing 196 expository sermons on the Gospels and Epistles and the Expositio in Cantica canticorum, a commentary on the Song of Songs written during his time in Paris.
