= Siege of Viterbo =

Siege and battle in 1243 in Italy

- Part of the Wars of the Guelphs and Ghibellines
Date	8 September – 13 November 1243
Location	Viterbo, Lazio, present-day Italy 42°25′05″N 12°06′17″E
Result	Papal-Guelph victory: Frederick II abandons the siege; Imperial garrison withdraws from Viterbo

Belligerents
Holy Roman Empire; Kingdom of Sicily; Ghibellines	Papal States; Viterbese Guelphs

Commanders and leaders
Frederick II; Riccardo Sanseverino; Pandolfo di Fasanella; Simone da Chieti	Ranieri Capocci

Strength
6,000–8,000 men: c. 2,000–2,500 cavalry; German, Sicilian and Abruzzese troops; Lombard and Tuscan communal infantry; Luceran Saracen archers; 400-man imperial garrison inside Viterbo	3,000 defenders: Viterbese civic infantry and cavalry; Crossbowmen, archers and slingers; Mercenary men-at-arms; Papal reinforcements

Casualties and losses
1,000 killed, wounded or captured	Few hundred killed or wounded
- Location within Italy Siege of Viterbo (Mediterranean)

The siege of Viterbo was a military engagement fought in 1243 between forces of the Holy Roman Emperor Frederick II and the predominantly Guelph government of Viterbo, supported by the Papal States. The crisis began on 8 September when a revolt organised with the assistance of Cardinal Ranieri Capocci overthrew the city's pro-imperial government and confined an imperial garrison under Simone da Chieti in the fortified quarter of San Lorenzo. Frederick regarded Viterbo, approximately 50 kilometres (31 mi) north of Rome, as a strategically important base for imperial power in central Italy and personally led an army to recover it.

After several weeks of fighting, including two major imperial assaults, the Viterbese successfully defended their field fortifications. A large attack on 10 November was defeated by a counterattack which destroyed much of Frederick's siege equipment and forced him to abandon the operation. The imperial garrison subsequently evacuated the city under a negotiated agreement, leaving Viterbo under papal and Guelph control.

== Background ==
Viterbo had occupied an important place in Frederick II's central Italian strategy since 1240. During his advance through the Patrimony of Saint Peter, the city had submitted to imperial authority and subsequently became one of the principal bases from which Frederick could exert military pressure upon Rome and the papal territories. Frederick installed his supporter Simone da Chieti as governor and provided him with a substantial garrison of approximately 400 German and Abruzzese cavalry. Control of Viterbo was therefore particularly valuable because of its position north of Rome and its importance within the communications network of the papal patrimony.

Imperial government nevertheless generated considerable internal opposition. The abolition of the popular office of balivo del Comune had strengthened aristocratic families aligned with Frederick while alienating merchants, artisans and other elements of the urban popolo. Cardinal Ranieri Capocci, himself a native of Viterbo and one of Frederick's most determined opponents within the papal curia, exploited these tensions and maintained an extensive network of local clients and supporters.

On 8 September 1243 the popular party revolted, rapidly seized control of most of the city and summoned Ranieri, who entered with hired men-at-arms. The imperial garrison and local Ghibellines were driven after fighting into the fortified San Lorenzo quarter. The revolt occurred while the newly elected Pope Innocent IV and Frederick were attempting to negotiate a settlement. Ranieri probably intended both to weaken Frederick's position in the Patrimony and to obstruct an easy imperial-papal reconciliation.

== Siege ==
The isolated imperial garrison immediately came under intense pressure. The Viterbese cut or disrupted its water supply, bombarded the fortified position with bows, crossbows and siege engines, and attempted to undermine its walls. Simone da Chieti repeatedly requested assistance from Riccardo Sanseverino, count of Caserta and imperial governor in northern Lazio, who possessed approximately 1,500 cavalry within a few days' march of the city. Sanseverino nevertheless waited for Frederick to arrive with additional forces.

Frederick consequently abandoned plans to remain in southern Italy and personally mobilised a relief army. By early October his forces had established a camp west of Viterbo. On 8 October he was accompanied by Sanseverino, the Tuscan imperial vicar Pandolfo di Fasanella, the imperial vicar of the Marches Riccardo di Fasanella and other imperial officers. The defenders had meanwhile enclosed the area surrounding the trapped imperial garrison with an elaborate field fortification consisting of a ditch, earthen rampart and strong palisade. Frederick attempted to storm this position rather than undertake a prolonged blockade. The first assault was repulsed under concentrated fire from Viterbese crossbowmen, archers and slingers; the ditch became filled with imperial dead and wounded before the attackers withdrew in disorder.

Frederick then prepared a much larger attack. Lombard and Tuscan infantry were recalled, Luceran Saracen archers were brought forward, and an extensive siege train was assembled of wheeled rams, folding metal ladders, movable bridges, hooked chains intended to tear down palisades, incendiary wagons and armoured transports capable of carrying dismounted knights. Pitch and so-called Greek fire were also prepared. The Viterbese strengthened their own fortifications with towers, covered walkways and concealed tunnels for sorties, while Innocent IV granted crusading privileges to those who came to their assistance and Ranieri excommunicated participants in the imperial siege.

The final assault began on 10 November. Imperial engines and missile troops opened the attack while protected vehicles advanced to the ditch. Attempts to burn the Viterbese fortifications failed, and fierce hand-to-hand fighting developed along the palisade. The defenders eventually emerged through their concealed passages and counterattacked, setting fire to much of the imperial siege equipment. A noble carrying imperial insignia was killed by a crossbow bolt, prompting a rumour that Frederick himself had fallen. As the Viterbese pressed forward and threatened the attackers' flanks, Frederick ordered a withdrawal to his camp. Stürner similarly describes the sortie as a bitter imperial defeat in which the Viterbese burned Frederick's camp, siege engines, rams, weapons and equipment.

== Aftermath ==
The failure of the 10 November assault effectively ended Frederick's attempt to recover Viterbo. The defeat was heavy and Frederick no longer possessed the immediate resources necessary to maintain the army before the city. His difficulties had already been aggravated by the expense of the operation, irregular payment of troops and desertions among some Lombard and Tuscan contingents. Papal and Viterbese forces, by contrast, continued to receive supplies and reinforcements through an imperfect imperial blockade, much of them financed by Ranieri Capocci.

Negotiations followed through the mediation of Cardinal Otto of San Nicola. Frederick agreed to abandon the siege after receiving assurances that Simone da Chieti, the imperial garrison and Frederick's local adherents would be permitted to leave Viterbo safely. Frederick was encouraged to believe that his concession might improve the prospects for peace with Innocent IV. The imperial army withdrew towards Tuscany and established itself near Grosseto, allowing Frederick to retain a presence close to central Italy.

The evacuation agreement was then violated. As the imperial party left the fortified quarter, Viterbese forces attacked them. The imperial knights were stripped of weapons and possessions while local adherents of Frederick were arrested and imprisoned; Simone and his knights escaped with their lives only with great difficulty and that Frederick's Viterbese supporters were imprisoned and dispossessed. Many members of the withdrawing imperial force were killed despite Cardinal Otto's presence and the promised safe-conduct.

Frederick reacted furiously and publicised what he regarded as a flagrant violation of the agreement to other European rulers. Innocent IV formally admonished the Viterbese, but the city remained under the control of Ranieri and the papal party. Militarily, Viterbo was an important local reverse: Frederick lost a strategically valuable base north of Rome and failed to recover it despite personally directing a substantial operation. Politically, however, the setback did not terminate attempts at reconciliation. Indeed, Imperial-papal negotiations resumed by early December and continued into 1244, demonstrating that even the bitter Viterbo affair had yet to make a wider settlement impossible. Yet, Innocent IV would flee to Lyon in the next year and the conflict between the papacy and Frederick II continued until the emperor’s death in 1250.

== See also ==
- Frederick II, Holy Roman Emperor
- Guelphs and Ghibellines
- History of Viterbo

== Sources ==
- Abulafia, David (1988). Frederick II: A Medieval Emperor. London: Allen Lane. ISBN 978-0-7139-9004-1.
- di Carpegna Falconeri, Tommaso. "Ranieri di Viterbo". Federiciana. Enciclopedia Italiana.
- Grillo, Paolo (2023). Federico II: La guerra, le città e l'Impero. Milan: Mondadori. ISBN 978-88-04-76912-5.
- Stürner, Wolfgang (2000). Friedrich II. Teil 2: Der Kaiser 1220–1250. Darmstadt: Primus Verlag.
