= Peter of Capua =

Peter of Capua, Pietro Capuano and Petrus Capuanus may refer to:

- Peter of Capua the Elder (died 1214), author and apostolic legate on the Fourth Crusade, cardinal-priest of San Marcello al Corso, uncle of the younger man
- Peter of Capua the Younger (died 1236), cardinal-deacon of San Giorgio in Velabro, patriarchate-designate of Antioch in 1219, nephew of the older man
