= Cicogni =

Town in Emilia-Romagna, Italy

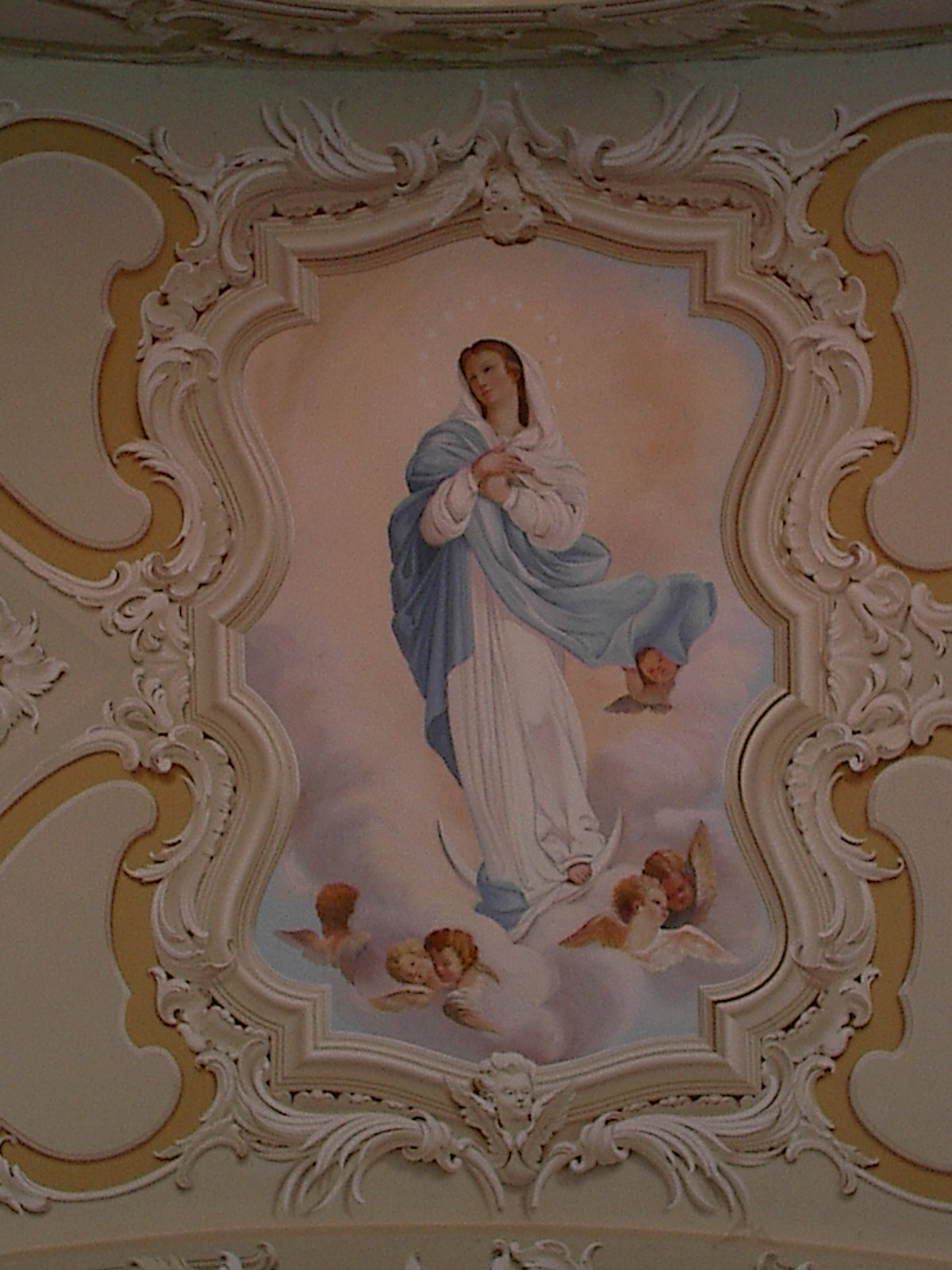
Church of the Assumption of Mary. Capelli's Fresco in the ceiling of the nave.

Cicogni is a town in the comune of Alta Val Tidone (Province of Piacenza) in the Italian region Emilia-Romagna, located about 40 km southwest of Piacenza.

== Tourism ==
Cicogni is known for its folkloristic traditions, particularly about the beginning of the spring, celebrated with its own feast in the first days of May.

Its forests are full of mushrooms, chestnuts and a wide variety of flora and fauna (especially roe deers, boars and foxes).

== Main sights ==
The local church of Santa Maria Annunziata, built in the 1812 (on the ruins of the old one, which dated from the 15th century) has a stone facade that hides the interiors, painted in the Rococo style by Angelo Capelli.

== Sources ==
- Treaty about the borders between the Courts of Turin and Parma – Royal Printing House, Turin 1766
- Molossi, Lorenzo – Topographic vocabulary of the Duchy of Parma and Piacenza – Ducal Printing House, Parma 1834
- Charles Athanase Walckenaer - Géographie ancienne, historique et comparée des Gaules – Dufart, Paris 1839
- Cipolla, Carlo- Corpus diplomaticus Sancti Columbani Bobii– Senate Printing House, Rome 1918
