= Peter of Capua the Younger =

Italian theologian and clergyman

Peter of Capua (c. 1180 – 23 March 1236), known in Italian as Pietro Capuano, was an Italian theologian and clergyman who taught at the University of Paris from 1206 to 1218, was briefly patriarchate-designate of Antioch in 1219 and was then cardinal-deacon of San Giorgio in Velabro from 1219 until his death. The scion of an illustrious family from the Kingdom of Sicily and educated at Paris, he became known in Rome as a friend of the French church and of the Holy Roman Emperor.

He is called "the Younger" to distinguish him from his uncle, Peter of Capua the Elder.

== Family, education and teaching career ==
Peter belonged to an illustrious Lombard family of Amalfi. His uncle was the cardinal-priest of San Marcello al Corso. The name of Peter's father is uncertain. It may have been the cardinal's brother, Manso, who received the royal baths at Amalfi from King Frederick II in 1205 and is known from documents between 1180 and 1213. Peter had a brother named John, who controlled the comestabulia militaris (military constabulary) and several fiefs in Carinola and Rocca Mondragone under Frederick II. A contemporary and relative, Giovanni Capuano, was the archbishop of Amalfi.

Peter was born around 1180. He studied philosophy and theology at the University of Paris, his uncle's alma mater. When his uncle came to France on official business in 1198, he secured for Peter canonries in the cathedrals of Paris and Sens and a benefice from the abbey of Saint Martin at Tours to support him in his studies. In 1206, Peter gave up his benefice in Tours. Around the same time, he earned a doctorate in theology and began teaching at the university.

Two sermons of Peter's can be found in a collection now in the Bibliothèque nationale de France, MS nouv. acq. lat. 999. The first takes as its starting point the first verse of Obadiah and, using crusade imagery, urges the audience to heed Christ's summons to battle sin. The other was based on Song of Songs 1:6 and was directed at an audience of crusaders. After his ascension to the papacy in 1216, Honorius III began a correspondence with Peter, making him one of the most famous Parisian professors.

== Patriarch-designate and cardinal ==
In late 1218 or early 1219, Honorius made Peter a papal subdeacon and brought him to Rome. On 25 April 1219, he appointed him to the vacant patriarchate of Antioch. In the letter announcing his appointment, Honorius praised him as "a man greatly esteemed for his knowledge, character and reputation." In October 1219, before Peter had been consecrated or left for Antioch, he was made cardinal-deacon of San Giorgio in Velabro. Rainier was chosen instead for Antioch. On 5 October, Peter was present as a cardinal when Honorius restored the diocese of Terni. He was probably one of the advisors behind the pope's constitution Super speculam, issued 16 November, which forbade the teaching of law at the University of Paris. He was with Honorius at Orvieto in June 1220.

As cardinal, Peter remained mostly with the Roman curia. He never led a legation or held any administrative post. At the curia, he looked out for the interests of the French church. He was also regarded as an ally of Frederick II. In 1221, Peter, along with Cardinal Thomas of Capua, supported the proposed new law of Archbishop Peter II of Naples that would have protected ecclesiastical property from confiscation. In 1222, Frederick approached him when the actions of the imperial steward, Gunzelin von Wolfenbüttel, and Berthold von Urslingen in the duchy of Spoleto outraged Honorius. In 1223, when Frederick placed under royal protection the monastery of San Pietro della Canonica ad Amalfi, which had been founded by Peter's family, he called Peter "our friend". In 1225, ambassadors from England approached a group of cardinals including Peter in order to draw the pope's attention to the ongoing Anglo-French conflict.

In 1227, as papal auditor, Peter quashed the election of a certain Thomas to the diocese of Fondi. In 1228, he was a member of the committee of cardinals that examined Walter d'Eynsham, found him theologically unfit and recommended Pope Gregory IX quash his election as archbishop of Canterbury. On 11 May 1230, he rejected a complaint from the Hospitallers of San Basilio in Rome against Gregory IX's decision to grant the monastery of San Damiano in terra Arnolfi to the Cistercians. This case would continue to be litigated down to 1244, but the Hospitallers still lost.

In 1232–1233, Peter successfully petitioned the general chapter of the Cistercians to convert San Pietro della Canonica from a priory into a full abbey under the authority of Fossanova. In 1234, the pope sent him and cardinal-bishop John of Sabina on a diplomatic mission to the court of Frederick II. Their charge was to persuade Frederick to submit his conflict with the Lombard League to papal arbitration. In February 1236, he was with the pope at Viterbo to hear the request of Bologna that its rival, Modena, be excommunicated. He subscribed his last papal bull on 26 February.

Although Peter's death is usually placed in 1242, it seems more likely that he died in the same year he is last recorded as being alive. Four different necrologies give three different days for his death: 23 March in those of Montecassino and San Ciriaco de Camiliano, 22 March in that of Rouen and 21 March in that of Paris. The first is most likely.

== Bibliography ==
- Bird, Jessalynn (2017). "Crusade and Reform: The Sermons of Bibliothèque Nationale, MS nouv. acq. lat. 999". In E.J. Mylod; Guy Perry; Thomas W. Smith; Jan Vandeburie (eds.). The Fifth Crusade in Context: The Crusading Movement in the Early Thirteenth Century. Routledge. pp. 92–113.
- Brentano, Robert (1994). A New World in a Small Place: Church and Religion in the Diocese of Rieti, 1188–1378. University of California Press.
- Hamilton, Bernard (1980). The Latin Church in the Crusader States: The Secular Church. Ashgate.
- Kamp, Norbert (1976). "Capuano, Pietro". Dizionario Biografico degli Italiani, Volume 19: Cappi–Cardona (in Italian). Rome: Istituto dell'Enciclopedia Italiana. ISBN 978-8-81200032-6.
- Miranda, Salvador (2018) [1998]. "Biographical Dictionary: Pope Honorius III (1216–1227) — Consistory of October, November or December 1219 (III) — Celebrated in Rome". The Cardinals of the Holy Roman Church. Florida International University Libraries.
