= Septizodium =

Building in Rome, built 203

Coordinates: 41°53′07″N 12°29′20″E

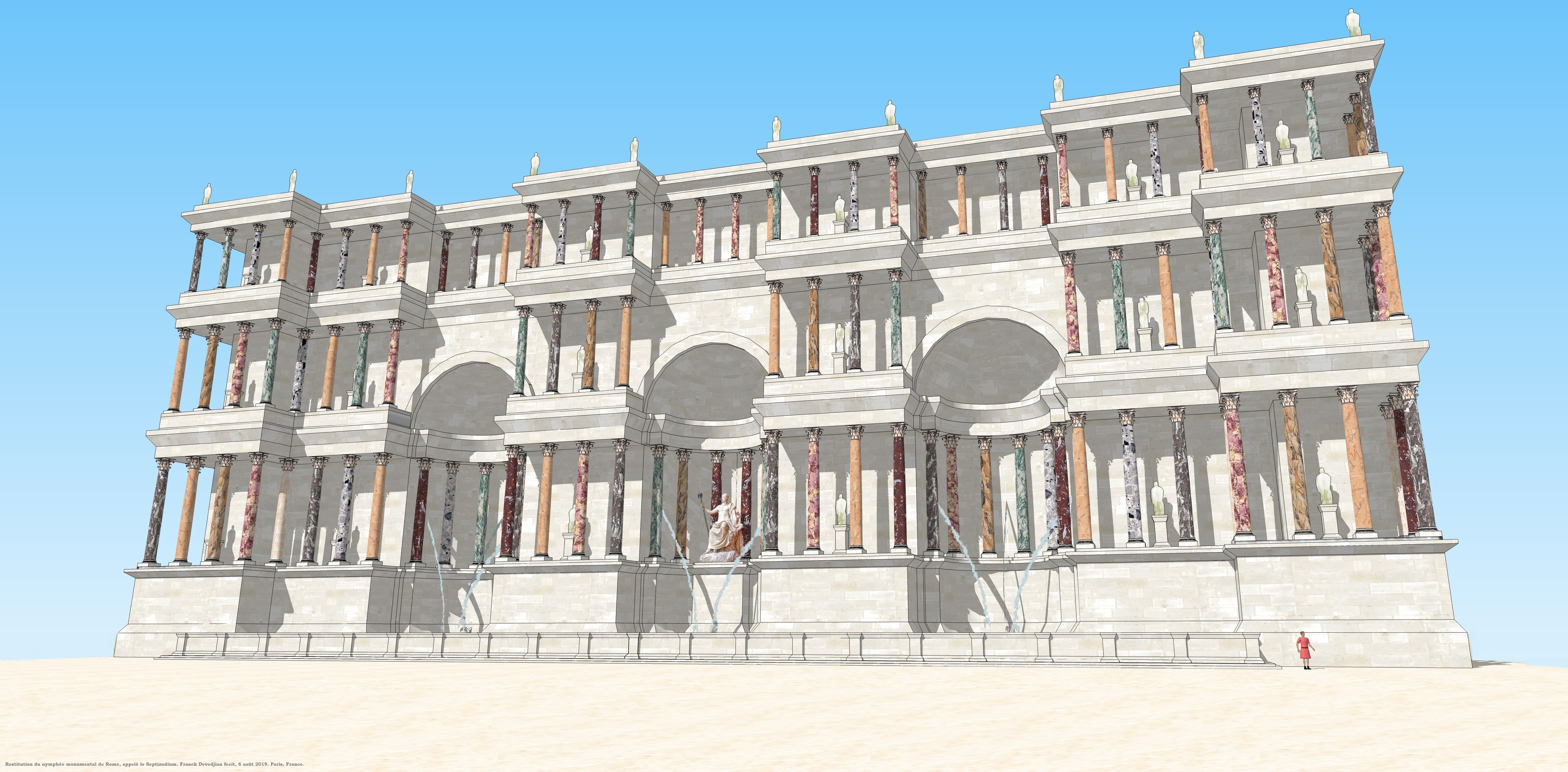
3D reconstruction of the Septizodium

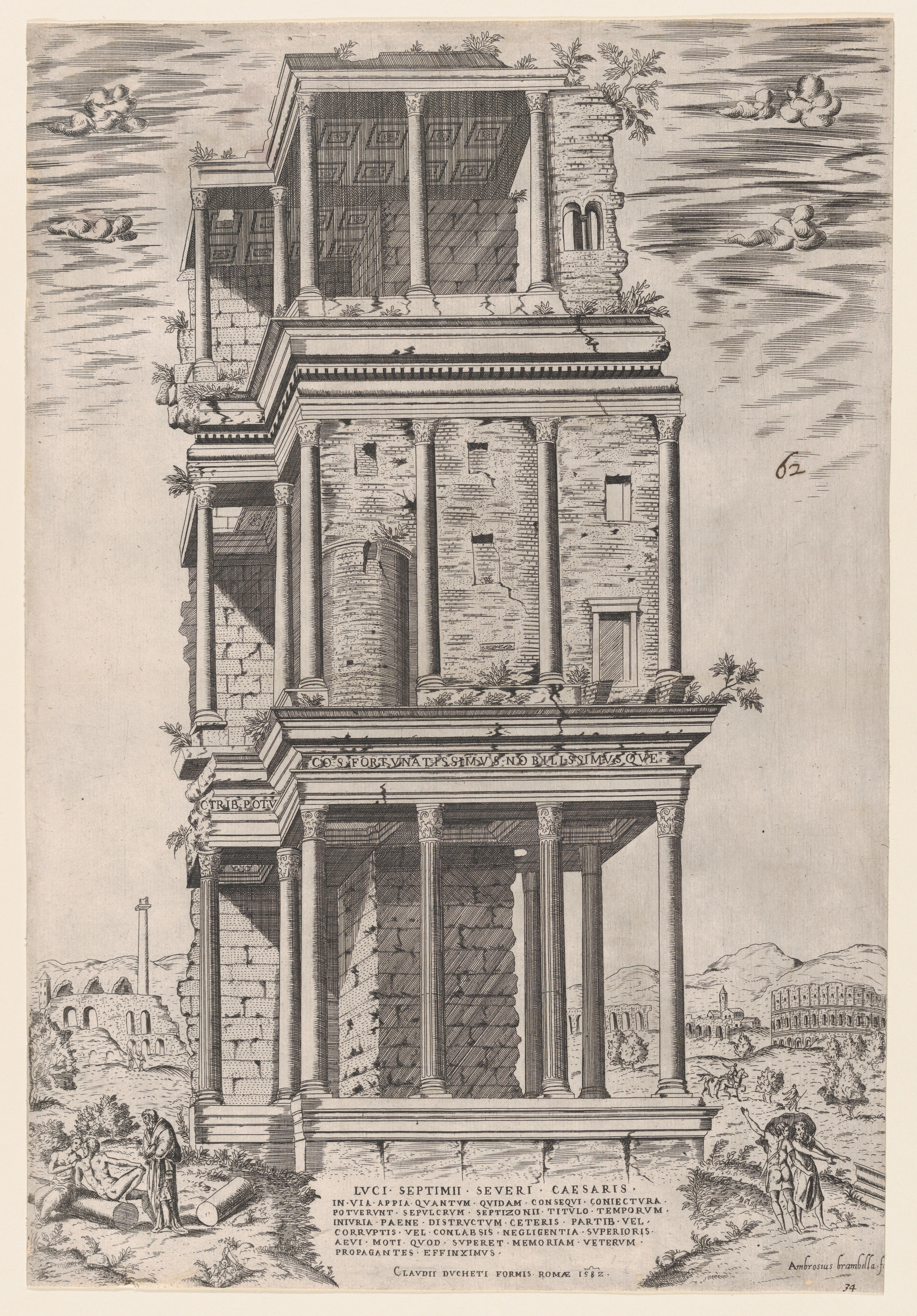
A fragment of the Septizonium is shown in this engraving dating to 1582.

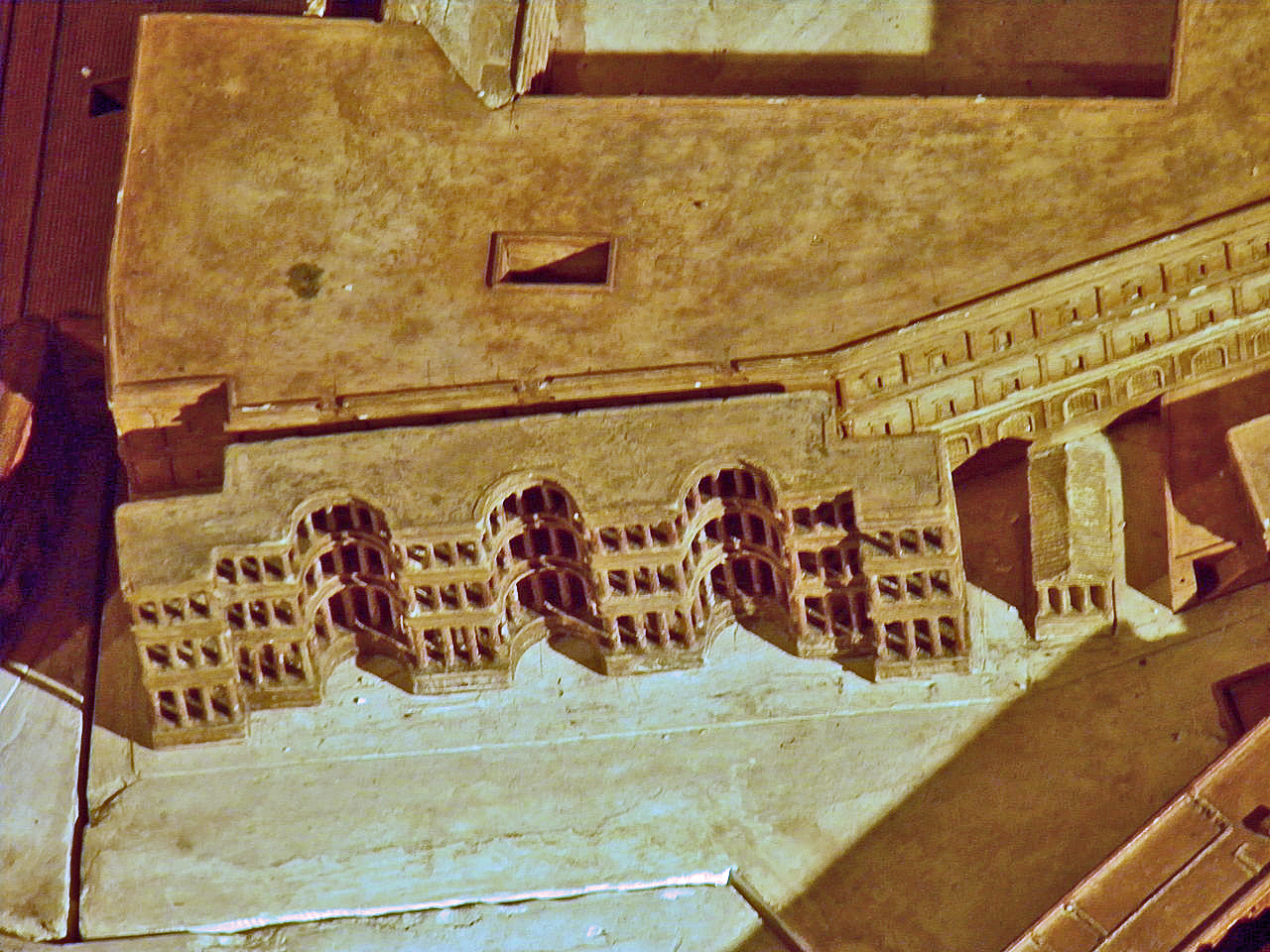
Septizodium, plan de Rome de Paul Bigot, université de Caen MRSH

The Septizodium (also called Septizonium, Septicodium, or Septisolium) was a building in ancient Rome. It was built in 203 AD by Emperor Septimius Severus.

The origin of the name "Septizodium" is from Septisolium, from the Latin for temple of seven suns, and was probably named for the seven planetary deities (Saturn, Sol, Luna, Mars, Mercury, Jupiter, and Venus) or for the fact that it was originally divided into seven parts. The building had no known practical purpose and was probably meant to be a decorative façade, known as a nymphaeum. Ancient and medieval sources describe its purpose as being to impress Severus' fellow north Africans as they entered the city, as it was located at the place where the Via Appia passes the Palatine and leads east towards the Forum Romanum. Other examples of septizodia are known, all from Africa.

Ammianus Marcellinus refers to the building in an ambiguous passage: "The plebs...had come together at the Septemzodium, a popular place, where Marcus Aurelius built a Nymphaeum in a rather ostentatious style."

By the 8th century, the edifice was already ruined and had been incorporated in one of the numerous baronial fortresses of the medieval city, held in the 12th-13th century by the Frangipani family. In August 1241, after the death of Pope Gregory IX, the 11 cardinals who were able to get into Rome through the lines of Emperor Frederick II's army came together in the ramshackle palace of the Septizodium. The two-month-long election was arduous, not only because of the deep political crisis but the physical hardships. There was a frightful heat and the rain leaked through the roof of the chamber of the cardinals, mingled with the urine of Matteo Rosso Orsini's guards on the rooftiles. One of the cardinals fell ill and died. The new pope, Celestine IV, was also very worn out, and died 16 days after his election.

In 1588, during the reign of Pope Sixtus V, the eastern facade of the building was demolished under the direction of Domenico Fontana. The stones obtained were used for the basement of the Flaminio Obelisk of Piazza del Popolo, the restoration of the Column of Marcus Aurelius, the pope's tomb in St. Mary Major and other structures.

== See also ==
- List of ancient monuments in Rome

== Sources ==
- Ammianus Marcellinus: The Later Roman Empire (AD 354–378) translated by Walter Hamilton. Penguin, London 1986.
- Theodor Dombart: Das palatinische Septizonium zu Rom. Beck, Munich, 1922
- Karl Hampe: Ein ungedruckter Bericht über das Konklave von 1241 im römischen Septizonium. (= Sitzungsberichte der Heidelberger Akademie der Wissenschaften, Philosophisch-Historische Klasse; Jg. 1913, Abh. 1). Winter, Heidelberg 1913
- Christian Hülsen: Das Septizonium des Septimus Severus. 46. Programm zum Winkelmannsfeste der Archäologischen Gesellschaft zu Berlin, 1886, S. 1-36
- Platner, Samuel Ball and Thomas Ashby, A Topographical Dictionary of Ancient Rome (1929): "Septizonium"
