= Otto of Tonengo =

Italian diplomat and cardinal

His Eminence Otto of Tonengo
- Cardinal-Bishop of Porto–Santa Rufina
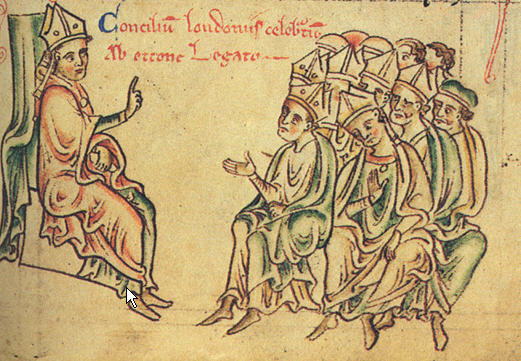
- Otto presiding over the council of London in 1237, from a copy of the Chronica Majora. 13th century
- Church: Catholic Church
- Appointed: 28 May 1244
- Term ended: 1251
- Predecessor: Romano Bonaventura
- Successor: Giacomo da Castell
- Previous posts: Cardinal-Deacon of San Nicola in Carcere (1227-1244)

Orders
- Created cardinal: 18 September 1227 by Pope Gregory IX
- Rank: Cardinal-Bishop

Personal details
- Born: c. 1190 Tonengo, Italy
- Died: c. 1250-51 Lyon, France

Otto of Tonengo (Note: Othon de Montferrat, Ottone Candido, Otto of Toneno, Ottone da Tonengo, Otto de Thonengo, Oddone di Monferrato.) (c. 1190 – 1250/1251) was an Italian papal diplomat and cardinal, first as deacon of San Nicola in Carcere from 1227 and then as bishop of Porto e Santa Rufina from 1244.

He is called in many English sources Otto Candidus, meaning "Otto the White", a name he used himself.

Otto had a legal education, and had joined the Roman curia by 1225. His first mission was to England to raise funds for the Sixth Crusade in 1225–1226. In 1227–1228, he undertook his first embassy to Frederick II, Holy Roman Emperor. In 1229–1231, he travelled extensively through France, the Low Countries, Germany, Denmark and Norway on Papal business. In 1232–1233, he undertook his second embassy to Frederick II.

In 1237–1240, he was the apostolic legate in England, Scotland and Ireland. This was by far his most successful mission. Returning to the curia, he was captured by imperial forces in the battle of Giglio in 1241. He remained imprisoned at least until 1243. In 1244–1245, he undertook a third and final embassy to Frederick II. Thereafter, his work slowed down and he is not heard of after 1249.

== Family and education ==
Otto was born at Tonengo in the Piedmont, between about 1180 and 1200, into a family closely linked to the nobility of Cocconato and Cavagnolo and to the Fieschi of Genoa. His family was among the feudatories of the Marquisate of Montferrat, but he was not a blood relative of Marquis William III, as sometimes alleged. He was a friend of William of Modena.

Otto began his ecclesiastical career as a canon and general assessor in the cathedral of Ivrea in the 1210s. He was soon acting as a judge delegate, which suggests he had a legal education. In 1224, he was studying law at the University of Bologna when he was sent before Pope Honorius III to protest on behalf of the school the regulations imposed by the podestà and comune. He received the rank of magister and may be the magister decretorum (master of decretals) named Otto who was a canon for a time in the cathedral of Bologna.

== Early Papal service ==
Otto impressed Honorius III on his mission of 1224 and he was recruited into the Papal chancery and appointed a Papal chaplain. By February 1225, he held the post of auditor litterarum contradictarum, auditor of contradicting letters. Later that year, as a subdeacon, he was sent to England to raise funds for the Sixth Crusade. He left England before Easter 1226, having achieved little.

After his return to Rome, Otto witnessed a testamentary codicil of a fellow Piedmontese, Cardinal Guala Bicchieri. It is probably through connection such as this that he rose so fast in ecclesiastical ranks. He was appointed cardinal deacon of San Nicola in Carcere by Pope Gregory IX on 18 September 1227, a little over two years since entering the Papal chancery. His first subscription as a cardinal is dated 23 September.

== Papal legations ==
Otto undertook numerous missions for Gregory IX in northern Europe. In December 1227, he was sent with Cardinal Thomas of Capua on a secret mission to the Frederick II, Holy Roman Emperor. By January 1228, he was back in Rome. In February 1229, he left on a major legation to northern Europe that lasted until 1231. In April, he was at Paris assisting in the negotiations between the Queen Regent Blanche and Count Raymond VII of Toulouse that produced the Treaty of Paris (April 12).

Otto subsequently pursued ecclesiastical reforms in the Holy Roman Empire. In 1229, he issued statutes for the reform of the Benedictines and Augustinians in Alsace, and between December 1229 and May 1230 he helped organize a new religious order, the Penitent Sisters of Saint Mary Magdalene in Germany. In the summer of 1230, he visited Denmark and Norway. There he promulgated a statute forbidding clerical concubinage. From Denmark, he went to Bremen, then Munich, then Cologne, where he convoked a council of the German church to be held at Würzburg. He met resistance from the secular leaders and the council was poorly attended. According to the Royal Chronicle of Cologne, Otto "withdrew irate" (iratus recessit). He rejoined the Papal court at Rieti in early summer 1231.

Early in 1232, Gregory IX sent Otto with Cardinal James of Pecorara to northern Italy to negotiate a peace between the warring factions of the Guelphs and Ghibellines, the latter the allies of Emperor Frederick II. Frederick, however, caused negotiations to drag on for over a year before an agreement was reached.

Between 1233 and 1237, Otto was mostly with the Papal court, acting as auditor again. In May 1236, King Henry III of England requested a Papal legate be sent to his kingdom to resolve both internal disputes and a dispute with King Alexander II of Scotland. In August 1236, Gregory IX appointed Otto as legate a latere. He left on 13 April 1237, arriving in England in July. His remit covered not only England, but Scotland and Ireland also.

Otto presided over the negotiations between Henry III and Alexander II that began on 14 September 1237 and ended with the signing of the Treaty of York on 25 September. He then presided over the a council of the English church in London, which adopted reforms in line with the Fourth Lateran Council of 1215. The statutes promulgated by Otto after this council are transmitted in more than sixty manuscripts.

He mediated between the Archbishop of Canterbury and Archbishop of York in London in 1237. When in July 1237 he came to Osney Abbey, a brawl broke out between a group of scholars from the university and the cardinal's men in which the legate's cook was killed. Otto himself was locked for safety in the abbey tower, emerging unscathed to lay the city under interdict in reprisal. In 1240 he visited Shaftesbury Abbey and confirmed a charter of 1191, the first entered in the Glastonbury chartulary.

Otto resided in London throughout most of 1238 and 1239. On 10 November 1238, he attended a meeting of the provincial chapter of Benedictine abbots and priors. In 1239, he went to Scotland to publish the excommunication of the Emperor Frederick II. In October he held a council in Edinburgh to introduce the Lateran reforms to the Scottish church. He visited Ireland to do the same before returning to London, where he spent the next year. He left England on 29 December 1240.

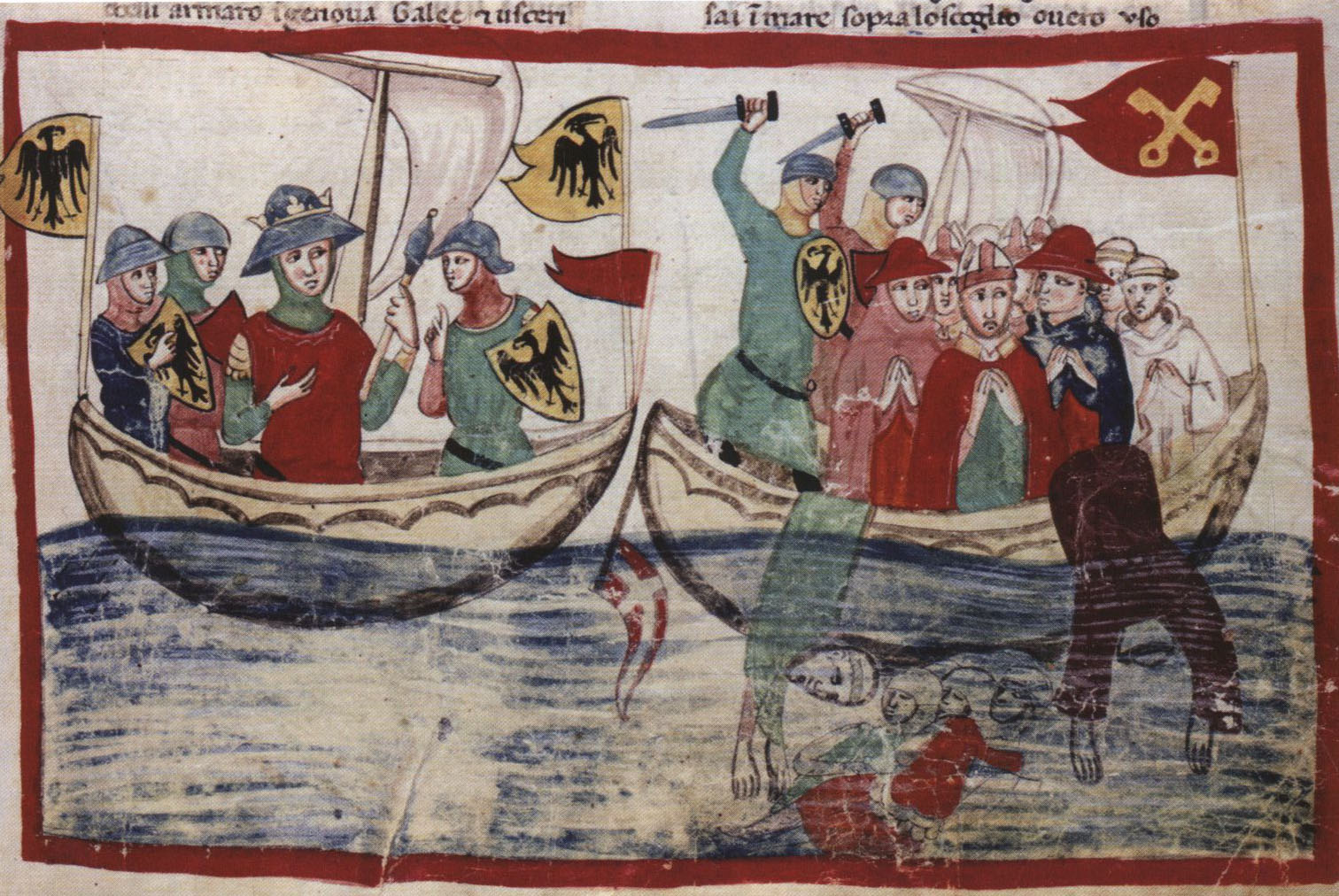
Otto and James of Pecorara (in cardinal's hats) captured at the battle of Giglio in 1241, from a copy of the Nuova Cronica

== Captivity ==
Gregory IX had scheduled a general council for Easter 1241 at Rome. Otto, with many other churchman, including James of Pecorara, took ship at Genoa for Rome. The Genoese fleet was intercepted by the pro-imperial fleet of Pisa and defeated in a battle of Giglio on 3 May 1241. Otto and James were captured and brought to Salerno in the Kingdom of Sicily. Otto received better treatment than James, perhaps because he was seen as more valuable in negotiations.

After the death of Gregory IX on 21 August 1241, the College of Cardinals persuaded Frederick II to allow Otto and James to participate in the election of a successor provided that afterwards they return to prison. Frederick may have hoped to strengthen his hand through Otto's election as pope. Otto took part in both the election of 1241 that chose Celestine IV and the election of 1243 that chose Innocent IV.

== Final years and death ==
Freed at some point, Otto was transferred by Innocent IV from the deaconry of San Nicola to the bishopric of Porto e Santa Rufina on 28 May 1244. This constituted a promotion and a reward for his loyalty during his imprisonment. On the eve of the First Council of Lyon, Innocent dispatched him to Germany to negotiate peace with Frederick II and to regularize the Humiliati, a new religious movement.

Otto's last years were spent in the Papal court at Lyon, often acting as an auditor. He is last mentioned in February 1249 and a notice of 23 January 1251 records him as dead. He probably died late in 1250 or in the first weeks of 1251. He died at Lyon and was buried in the convent of the Dominicans there.

== Sources ==
- Abulafia, David (1988). Frederick II: A Medieval Emperor. Allen Lane.
- Davies, Adam (2007). "The Appointment of Cardinal-deacon Otto as Legate in Britain (1237)". In Björn Weiler; Janet Burton; Phillipp Schofield (eds.). Thirteenth Century England XI: Proceedings of the Gregynog Conference, 2005. Boydell Press. pp. 147–158.
- Fletcher, Stella (2017). The Popes and Britain: A History of Rule, Rupture and Reconciliation. I. B. Tauris.
- Silanos, Pietro (2014). "Ottone da Tonengo". Dizionario Biografico degli Italiani (in Italian). Vol. 80: Ottone–Pansa. Rome: Institute of the Italian Encyclopaedia. ISBN 978-88-12-00032-6.
