= Robert Somercotes =

English cardinal (died 1241)

Robert Somercotes (sometimes Somercote) (died 26 September 1241) was an English Cardinal. He took part in the Papal conclave, 1241, but died during it. It was rumoured at the time that he was papabile and was poisoned, to prevent his election.

He was named as cardinal of the church of San Eustachio in 1239 by Pope Gregory IX. He was buried at the church of San Crisogono in Rome.
