= Matteo Rosso Orsini =

Italian politician

Matteo Rosso Orsini (1178–1246), called the Great, was an Italian politician, the father of Pope Nicholas III. He was named senatore of the City of Rome by Pope Gregory IX in 1241: in this capacity he took a firm stand against the ventures in Italy of Frederick II, Holy Roman Emperor, and defeated him in 1243.

He was an effective lord of the Eternal City during sede vacante of 1241 and had a considerable influence on the papal election of that year, when the cardinal electors were confined in the Septizodium by his orders.

Following the election of Goffredo da Castiglione as Pope Celestine IV, Celestine's sole act in his 17-day papacy was to excommunicate Matteo, however, the assertion is disputed due to Matteo remaining senatore until 1242, and due to the naming of his son, Giovanni Gaetano Orsini, as cardinal in 1244.

He extended the territories of the Orsini family. He was also a personal friend of St Francis of Assisi and protector of his order.
