= Romano Bonaventura =

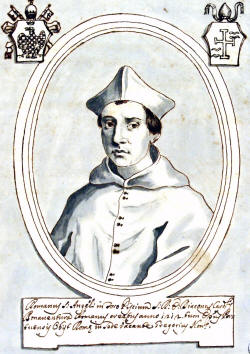
Portrait of Cardinal Romano Bonaventura.

Romano Bonaventura (before 1216–20 February 1243 (Note: Date of death according to the necrology of S. Maria in Trastevere (ed. Egidi).)) was a Catholic Christian prelate, Cardinal deacon of Sant'Angelo in Pescheria, his titulus (1216–1234), bishop of Porto-Santa Rufina (1231–1243), a cardinal-legate to the court of France.

Romano was listed as Romano Papareschi, which strongly suggests that he came from the Roman family, probably of the rione Trastevere, that produced Gregorio Papareschi (died 1143), Pope Innocent II. He was known to use his office to benefit his family members. Romano was archpriest of the Basilica di Santa Maria Maggiore (1220–1243) and by 1220, he was rector of Campagna-Marittima. In 1224, he was sent by Pope Honorius III, to France to arrange a peace treaty between Louis VIII of France and Henry III of England, concerning Louis's invasion of Poitou.

Romano was a jurist and as cardinal-legate to France, he summoned the Council of Bourges (1225), directed towards funding the Albigensian Crusade. The subjugation of Cathar forces in 1229, was due in part to Romano's preaching for crusade.

Romano took part in the Papal election, 1216, the Papal election, 1227, and the Papal election, 1241. During the 1241 election, he was a papal candidate supported by candinals Sinibaldo Fieschi, Raynald da Jenne, and Richard Annibaldi. He was prominent among the papabili known to continue Gregory IX's hostility towards Frederick II, Holy Roman Emperor.

== Sources ==
- Beattie, Blake R. (2007). Angelus Pacis: The Legation of Cardinal Giovanni Gaetano Orsini, 1326-1334. Brill. ISBN 9789004153936.
- Carpenter, David A. (2020). Henry III: The Rise to Power and Personal Rule, 1207-1258. Yale University Press. ISBN 9780300255508.
- Miranda, Salvado (2023). "Romano Bonaventura". The Cardinals of the Holy Roman Church.
- Strayer, Joseph R. (1992). The Albigensian Crusades. University of Michigan Press. ISBN 978-0472064762.
- Whalen, Brett Edward (2019). The Two Powers: The Papacy, the Empire, and the Struggle for Sovereignty in the Thirteenth Century. University of Pennsylvania Press. ISBN 9780812250862.
- William of Puylaurens (2003). Sibley, W.A.; Sibley, M.D. (eds.). The Chronicle of William of Puylaurens: The Albigensian Crusade and its Aftermath. Woosbridge: The Boydell Press. ISBN 978-0-85115-925-6.
