= Thomas of Capua =

Italian prelate and diplomat

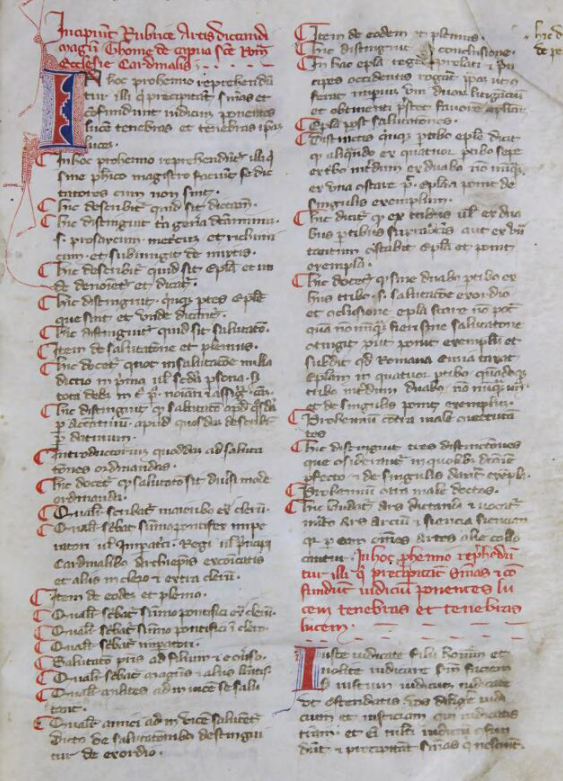
First page of a 14th-century French copy of Thomas's Ars dictandi.

Thomas of Capua (Italian: Tommaso da Capua, Latin: Thomas Capuanus), also called Tommaso di Eboli (before 1185 – August 1239), was an Italian prelate and diplomat. He served as the archbishop-elect of Naples from 1215 until 1216 and then as a cardinal until his death. He administered the diocese of Albano between 1218 and 1222 and was the papal legate in the kingdom of Italy from November 1236 until October 1237. He was the most important of Pope Gregory IX's negotiators with the Emperor Frederick II between 1227 and 1237.

Thomas was a notary and a longtime official of the apostolic chancery and apostolic penitentiary. He wrote poetry and style guides in Latin, and 700 of his letters have been preserved. He was an early supporter of the mendicant orders.

== Family ==
Thomas born no later than 1185, since the canonical age for a bishop was thirty and he was recorded as bishop-elect in February 1215. His own letters and the chronicle of Richard of San Germano indicate that he was from Capua in the Kingdom of Sicily. Of his mother nothing is known, but that he was a nobleman is certain. His father, Ebolus, is called a lord (dominus). A letter of Pope Innocent IV dated 14 November 1245, shows that Thomas belonged to the noble family of Eboli, which held lands in the Terra di Lavoro. Their name may derive either from the place called Eboli or from an ancestor named Ebolus. In the past, Thomas was sometimes erroneously considered a nephew of Pope Honorius III of the Roman Savelli family, or a member of the de Episcopo family of Capua.

Thomas's brother Peter was a justiciar of the Terra di Lavoro. Peter's son Marinus was an imperial official in the kingdoms of Italy and Sicily. Two other nephews, John and Marinus, became papal chaplains, the latter becoming papal vice-chancellor by 1244. Other relatives, like Enrico da Eboli and Rainaldo de Guasto, were also in imperial service. The Eboli were also related to the Filangieri and the counts of Aquino.

== Education and early career ==
Thomas attended the school of the cathedral of Capua. He took minor orders in Naples and was granted a canonry in Capua. He studied civil and canon law at the University of Vicenza after its founding in 1204. Bearing the title of lord, he is recorded among the syndics and procurators of the university on 25 July 1209. Pope Innocent III made him a papal subdeacon and a notary of the apostolic chancery, with which came the title of master (magister). He does not appear to have earned a university degree, and he only used the title magister from 1216.

At the papal court in Rome, Thomas attached himself to Pelagio Galvani, a cardinal from 1213. It is through this connection that Thomas found his way into the will of Marie of Montpellier, queen of Aragon, who left him a legacy at her death in April 1213.

In February 1215, Thomas was elected archbishop of Naples. By that time he was the de facto head of the papal chancery. He did not immediately leave for Naples, but remained in Rome, perhaps as requested by Innocent III. He attended the Fourth Lateran Council in November. In late February or early March 1216, he was appointed cardinal deacon of Santa Maria in Via Lata. In April, he was promoted to cardinal priest of Santa Sabina. At this point he resigned the archbishopric. He continued as head of the chancery until Innocent III's death in July 1216.

== Cardinal and diplomat ==
Between 1218 and 1222, Thomas administered the diocese of Albano while Cardinal Pelagio was away on the Fifth Crusade. In 1219, Honorius III put him in charge of the apostolic penitentiary. He also served as a papal judge-delegate. William the Breton in his Philippide portrays him as hearing confessions and granting absolution as if he were the pope in 1223. Gilles de Pontoise and the Chronicon Turonense portray him similarly. Salimbene de Adam calls him "the best speaker of the [papal] court".

During these years, Dominic of Caleruega moved into Santa Sabina. As a result, Thomas became an early supporter of the Dominican Order, intervening in its favour in the Kingdom of Sicily. In 1222, after Dominic's death, Honorius gave the church of Santa Sabina to his successor, Jordan of Saxony, strengthening Thomas's connection to the order. Thomas also gave support to the Franciscans and was in contact with Elias of Cortona.

In 1227, the clergy of the Kingdom of Jerusalem requested Thomas as their patriarch, but the newly elected Pope Gregory IX rejected them. In December 1227, Gregory IX sent Thomas and Cardinal Otto of Tonengo to Foggia to negotiate with Frederick II, Holy Roman Emperor and King of Sicily, who had been excommunicated for not fulfilling his crusader's vow, but who claimed illness. Since the pope's demands went beyond mere fulfillment of the vow, the negotiations failed. Thomas, however, established a good rapport with Frederick and with many of his closest allies, such as Hermann von Salza, Berard of Palermo, James of Capua and Pietro della Vigna.

In November 1229, negotiations to end the War of the Keys, which had broken out between pope and emperor, were opened in Aquino. The principal papal negotiators were Thomas and Cardinal John of Colonna. Details of the negotiations are preserved in the letters Thomas wrote and the registers he kept. The Treaty of San Germano was confirmed on 23 July 1230 and, on 28 August at Ceprano, Thomas and John released Frederick II from his excommunication.

Between October 1232 and April 1233, Thomas and Cardinal Rainald of Ostia mediated a dispute between the cities of Rome and Viterbo. In February 1235, he was part of a group of cardinals that met in Viterbo to mediate between Bologna and a league of cities led by Modena. In 1236, when relations between Gregory IX and Frederick II had again soured, Thomas wrote to Hermann von Salza and the emperor urging them to keep the peace and to calm their partisans in Rome. In November, Gregory sent Thomas and Rainald to northern Italy as papal legates, replacing the ardently anti-imperial James of Palestrina.

Start of Thomas's Forme romane curie super casibus penitentie with a partial table of contents in a late 13th-century Italian manuscript

In Bologna, Thomas and Rainald intervened to ensure proper treatment of prisoners of war. In Vercelli, they mediated a dispute between the bishop and the municipal government. In May 1237, they mediated negotiations between Frederick II and the Lombard League in Mantua and later at Brescia. Hermann von Salza and Pietro della Vigna were present. The legates offered to disband the league, but not to punish the cities. The reports they sent back to the pope depict the horrors of war in detail. In July, the negotiations were moved to Fiorenzuola d'Arda. By October they had fallen apart and Thomas and Rainald returned to Rome. As late as 1239, Thomas was still pushing for more negotiations within the college of cardinals.

In March 1239, Gregory IX re-excommunicated Frederick II. The emperor ordered all his subjects, with the exception of Thomas of Capua, to leave Rome. Thomas spent his last two years acting as a judge-delegate. He died at Anagni in August 1239. According to Richard of San Germano, the day was 18 or 19 August, but a necrology of the Abbey of Montecassino puts it on 22 August. Alphonsus Ciacconius accepted the date of 22 August, but placed his death in 1243.

== Writings ==
Thomas left behind a variety of writings in Latin. He is known to have composed hymns, antiphons and sequences dedicated to Francis of Assisi and Mary, mother of Jesus. He also penned a satirical distich about Rome. He wrote two treatises on writing in the ars dictaminis tradition. The Forme romane curie super casibus penitentie, written in 1219, is the original formulary of the apostolic penitentiary. It is a valuable record of papal penances imposed, dispensations granted and sentences handed down. His Ars dictandi, begun before 1216 and finished after 1220, describes the proper form and style of the papal chancery. Among his sources were the Rationes dictandi of Hugh of Bologna and the Summa dictaminis of Guido Faba.

About 700 letters written by Thomas are preserved. They are remarkable for their elevated Latinity and their value as a historical source for the conflict between church and empire in Italy. They are mostly official letters and mandates, but there is some private correspondence. His Ars dictandi and 623 of his letters were gathered together into a single collection, the Summa dictaminis Thome Capuani, which survives in 65 manuscripts. It also includes a few letters from popes Alexander IV, Urban IV and Clement IV and the papal vice-chancellor Cardinal Giordano Pironti. The Summa was not compiled by Thomas, but was probably put together at least in a rough draft by Giordano in 1268–1269. The letters are divided topically into ten books with indices. Occasionally, proper names have been deleted to better conform to its role as a formulary. Many of the letters in the Summa plus several others are found in another 32 letter collections. These do not generally omit proper names. Neither the Summa nor any of these other collections has received a modern critical edition.

Gregory, abbot of Santissima Trinità in Monte Sacro on Gargano, dedicated his poem De hominum deificatione to Thomas.

== Editions ==
- Lea, Henry Charles, ed. (1892). A Formulary of the Papal Penitentiary in the Thirteenth Century. Philadelphia: Lea Brothers.

== Bibliography ==
- Abulafia, David (1988). Frederick II: A Medieval Emperor. London: Allen Lane.
- Haskins, Charles H. (1905). "The Sources for the History of the Papal Penitentiary". The American Journal of Theology. 9 (3): 421–450. doi:10.1086/478542. hdl:2027/hvd.hnspef. JSTOR 3154453.
- Schaller, Hans Martin (1993). "Eboli, Tommaso di (Tommaso da Capua, Thomas Capuanus)". Dizionario Biografico degli Italiani (in Italian). Vol. 42: Dugoni–Enza. Rome: Institute of the Italian Encyclopaedia. pp. 266–271. ISBN 978-88-12-00032-6.
- Whalen, Brett Edward (2019). The Two Powers: The Papacy, the Empire, and the Struggle for Sovereignty in the Thirteenth Century. University of Pennsylvania Press.
