= Pope Celestine IV =

Head of the Catholic Church in 1241

- Bishop of Rome
- Church: Catholic Church
- Papacy began: 25 October 1241
- Papacy ended: 10 November 1241
- Predecessor: Gregory IX
- Successor: Innocent IV
- Previous posts: Cardinal-Priest of San Marco (1227–1239); Cardinal-Bishop of Sabina (1239–1241)

Orders
- Created cardinal: 18 September 1227 by Gregory IX

Personal details
- Born: Goffredo da Castiglione; Goffredo Castiglioni c. 1180/1187 Milan, Holy Roman Empire
- Died: 10 November 1241 Rome, Papal States
- Coat of arms

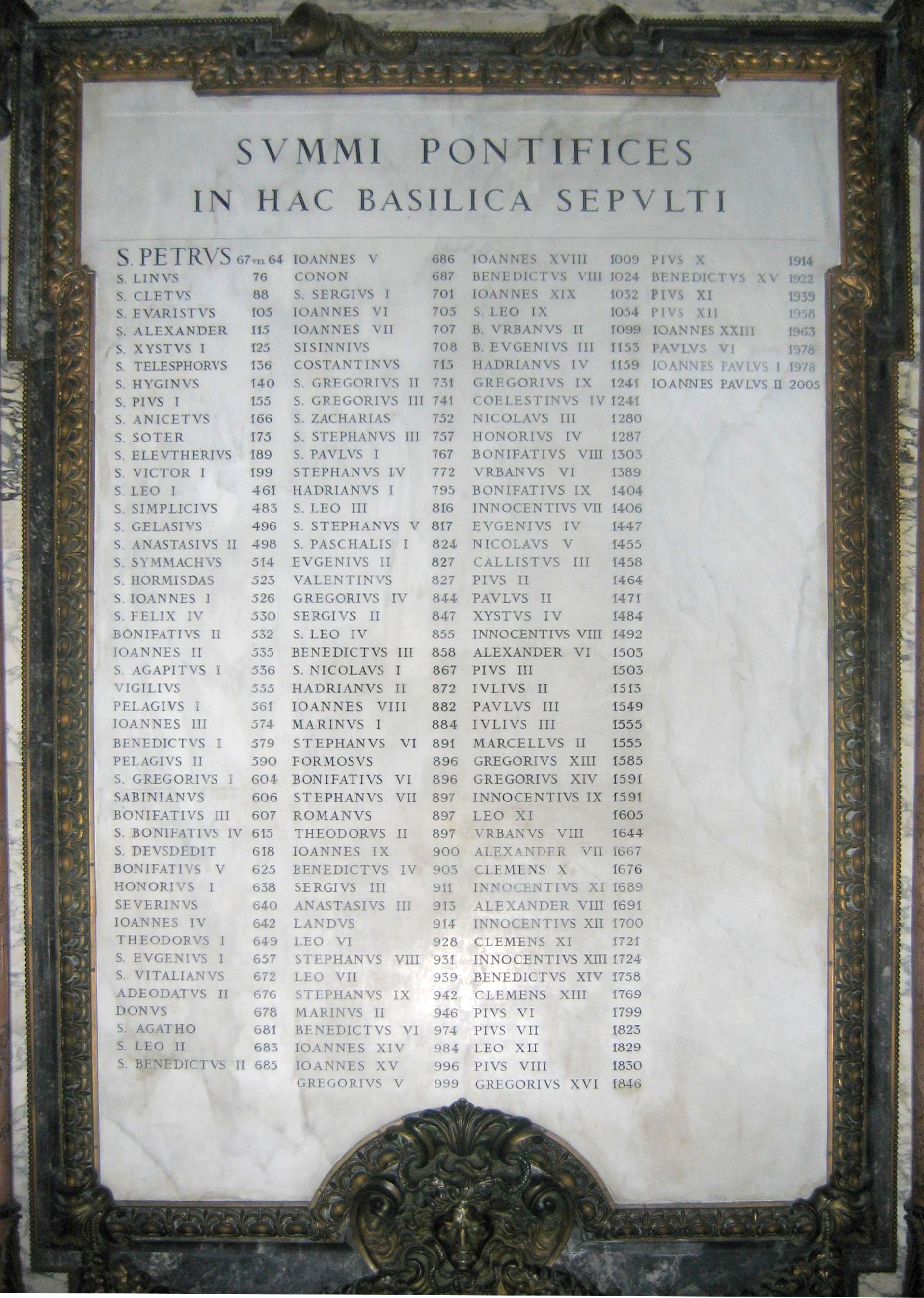
List of popes buried in St Peter's Basilica

Pope Celestine IV (Latin: Caelestinus IV; c. 1180/1187 − 10 November 1241), born Goffredo da Castiglione or Goffredo Castiglioni, was head of the Catholic Church and ruler of the Papal States from 25 October 1241 to his death on 10 November 1241.

== History ==
Born in Milan, Goffredo or Godfrey is often referred to as son of a sister of Pope Urban III, but this claim is without foundation. Nothing is known of his early life until he became chancellor of the church of Milan (perhaps as early as 1219, certainly in 1223–27). Pope Gregory IX made him a cardinal on 18 September 1227 with the diocese and benefice of San Marco, and in 1228–29 sent him as legate in Lombardy and Tuscany, where the cities and communes had generally remained true to the Hohenstaufen emperor, Frederick II. He was dispatched in an attempt to bring these territories around to the papal side, but without success. In 1238, he was made cardinal bishop of Sabina.

The papal election of 1241, which elevated Celestine to the papal throne, was held under stringent conditions that hastened his death. The papal curia was disunited over the violent struggle to bring the Emperor and King of Sicily, Frederick II, to heel. One group of cardinals favored the ambitious schemes of the Gregorian Reform and aimed to humble Frederick as a papal vassal. Frederick, however, controlled as his unwilling guests in Tivoli two cardinals whom he had captured at sea, and in Rome, Cardinal Giovanni Colonna was his ally, largely because the curia was in the hands of the archenemy of the Colonna family, the senator Matteo Rosso Orsini. The latter held the consistory captive under the control of his guards in the ramshackle palace of the Septizodium, where rain leaked through the roof of their chamber, mingled with the urine of Orsini's guards on the rooftiles. One of the cardinals, the Englishman Robert of Somercotes, fell ill and died.

One group of cardinals, which included Sinibaldo de' Fieschi (soon to be Pope Innocent IV), supported a candidate from the inner circle of Pope Gregory IX, who could be expected to pursue a hard line with Frederick II. Another group advocated a moderate middle course, not as allies of the Hohenstaufen, but desirous to achieve an end to the war in Italy. Overtures to Frederick II, however, were met with the impossible demand that if they wished the cardinals in his hands to return to Rome, they must elect as pope Otto of St. Nicholas, an amenable compromise figure. Matteo Rosso Orsini's candidate, Romano da Porto, who had persecuted scholars at the University of Paris, was considered unacceptable.

Only on 25 October 1241 was the cardinal bishop of Sabina finally elected by the required two-thirds majority, seven cardinals out of ten. He took the name Pope Celestine IV, but occupied the throne for only seventeen days. It is said that this was nevertheless long enough for him to proceed, as his only significant act, with the excommunication of Matteo Rosso Orsini. This assertion is disputed, it being said that in fact, Orsini continued as Senator of Rome in 1242 and was Senator when Innocent IV (Fieschi) was elected; and that his son (the future Nicholas III) was made a cardinal in 1244. In any event, Celestine IV died before he could be crowned, on 10 November 1241, of fatigue and old age, and was entombed in Saint Peter's Basilica.

== See also ==
- List of popes
- St Peter's Basilica

== Sources ==
- Grundmann, Herbert (1995). Religious Movements in the Middle Ages. University of Notre Dame Press. ISBN 9780268080891.
- Reardon, Wendy J. (2004). The Deaths of the Popes: Comprehensive accounts, including funerals, burial places and epitaphs. Jefferson, North Carolina: McFarland & Co. ISBN 978-0-7864-1527-4.
- Abulafia, David (1988). Frederick II: A Medieval Emperor. New York: Oxford University Press. p. 352. ISBN 978-0-19-508040-7.
- Lexikon der Mittelalters, vol. iii, part 7 (On-line).
- Bagliani, Agostino Pallavicini (1972). Cardinali di curia e familiae cardinalizie dal 1227 al 1254. Italia Sacra vols 18–19. Padua, Italy: Antenore. OCLC 2205084. A standard account.

Catholic Church titles
Preceded by Gregory IX	Pope; 1241	Succeeded by Innocent IV
