= German Inquisition =

13th century inquisition

The German Inquisition was established by Pope Gregory IX in 1231, and the first inquisitor was appointed in the territory of Germany. In the second half of the 14th century, permanent structures of the Inquisition were organized in Germany, which, with the exception of one tribunal, survived only until the time of the Reformation in the first half of the 16th century. In combating heretics in Germany, the Inquisition always played a secondary role compared to the ecclesiastical courts.

Geographically, the jurisdictional area of the German Inquisition from 14th to 16th century encompassed the ecclesiastical metropolitan provinces: Mainz, Cologne, Salzburg, Bremen, and Magdeburg, as well as the Archdiocese of Trier (without suffragans), the Diocese of Basel (belonging to the province of Besançon), exempted dioceses of Bamberg, Meissen, and Pomerania, as well as the Livonian territories belonging to the Teutonic Order. Burgundy and Lorraine, and until 1515 also southern Netherlands, although part of the Holy Roman Empire, were subject to French inquisitors appointed by the provincial of the Dominicans in Paris.

== Heretics in Germany from 11th to 13th century ==
The first mention of heretics in late medieval Germany dates back to 1051 when Emperor Henry III, against the protests of Catholic clergy, ordered the hanging of several individuals in Goslar who were deemed Manicheans due to their refusal to kill animals and consume meat. However, little is known about this group. Around 1114/1115, Tanchelm of Utrecht operated in the diocese of Utrecht, who was also accused of heresy. However, it is more likely that he was merely a radical and tactless religious reformer who antagonized the clergy of Utrecht too much. In any case, after his murder in 1115, his movement collapsed. From 1143 onwards, the presence of the dualistic Cathar sect was recorded in the Rhineland, which from the beginning met with hostile reception. In 1143, Count Otto von Rheineck burned three Cathars in Bonn, and in the same and following years, there were extrajudicial punishments of Cathars captured in Cologne and Liège. At that time, too, the Catholic clergy was opposed to the persecution of heretics. In 1163, there were again extrajudicial punishments of Cathars in Cologne, and shortly thereafter, they were expelled from Mainz. However, it seems that this sect did not establish lasting roots in Germany. Evidence of its presence in Germany in the first half of the 13th century is ambiguous, and later it is absent altogether.

A much greater role in the history of German heterodoxy before the Reformation was played by the Waldensian movement, which from the end of the 12th century gained an increasingly wide following, particularly in the Rhineland, Austria, and Bavaria, and later also in Brandenburg and Pomerania. It was against the Waldensians that one of the first organized large-scale repressive actions was directed. In 1212, Bishop Heinrich Veringen of Strasbourg discovered Waldensians in his diocese and, as a result of the investigation conducted, identified as many as 500 suspects, 80 of whom were burned at the stake.

In March 1232, Emperor Frederick II officially ordered that all people guilty of heresy in Germany should be punished by death by burning at the stake unless they submitted to the Church.

== Konrad von Marburg ==
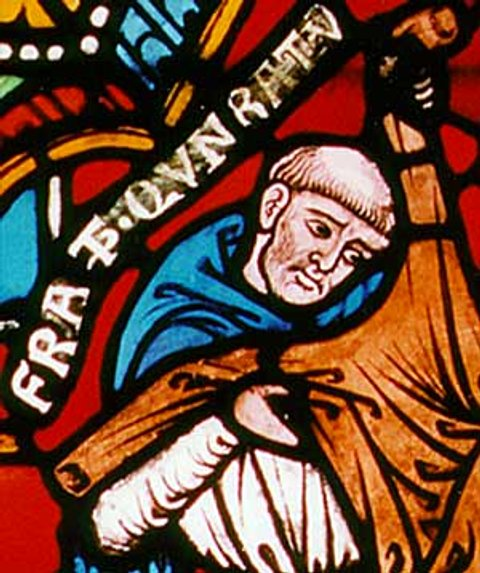
Konrad von Marburg – the first papal inquisitor

From 1227 onwards, sermons against heretics in Germany were preached by Konrad von Marburg, the confessor of Elisabeth of Thuringia. In October 1231, Pope Gregory IX expanded his mandate, appointing him as a delegate judge to combat heretics. In this way, Konrad became the first papal inquisitor in history, although formally both before and after this date he was only titled as Praedicator Verbi Dei (Preacher of the Word of God), not as Inquisitor haereticae pravitatis (Inquisitor of Heretical Perversity), as was the official title of papal inquisitors after 1233.

Konrad chose several fanatical collaborators to assist him, including Conrad Dorso and John the One-Eyed. Their activities quickly aroused fear. According to contemporary accounts, they gave the accused no opportunity for defense. Those who confessed to heresy received absolution, and as a penance, their heads were shaved as a mark of shame. Those who maintained their innocence were sentenced to the stake without proper verification of the charges. Konrad himself and his assistants were aware of the arbitrariness of their methods and the risk of error, but they reportedly claimed that they would burn a hundred innocents if there was even one guilty among them. In these conditions, inquisitorial activity also elicited protests from Catholics, including clergy. Archbishop Siegfried III von Eppstein of Mainz finally admonished Konrad, urging moderation. However, Konrad ignored these appeals. He was confident in the support of Pope Gregory IX, to whom he reported on the existence of a sect of Lucifer worshippers in Germany. Based on these reports, the pope issued the papal bull Vox in Rama in June 1233, repeating in it the fantastic accusations made by Konrad against German heretics. Konrad's and his collaborators' position remained unshaken until Konrad accused Count of Sayn of heresy. The count appealed to the Archbishop of Mainz, and Konrad was forced to submit to his authority. At the synod on 25 July 1233, the count was cleared of charges, despite the protests of the inquisitor. Five days later, Konrad was murdered, and shortly thereafter, Conrad Dorso and John the One-Eyed met a similar fate. The synod in Frankfurt in 1234 rehabilitated about 50 people convicted by Konrad von Marburg.

In 1231 and 1232, Pope Gregory IX issued identical papal bulls titled Ille humani generis to the Dominicans from the convents in Regensburg (22 November 1231), Friesach (27 November 1231), Würzburg (2 March 1232), and Strasbourg (2 December 1232), entrusting them with anti-heretical tasks. However, most likely, the scope of these tasks was limited to pastoral activities and supporting the activities of the episcopal courts, rather than encompassing inquisitorial powers in the strict sense of the word.

== From 1233 to 1348 ==
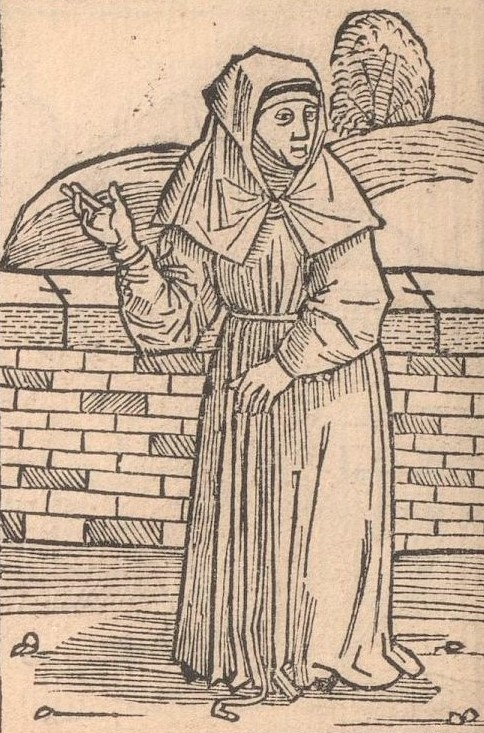
Beguine, late 15th century engraving

The Synod in Frankfurt in 1234 indeed marked the end of the existence of the papal inquisition in Germany for over a hundred years. The combating of heresy during this period was in the hands of the bishops, but there are no traces of any significant anti-heretical actions until the end of the 13th century. It is only known that around 1266, an investigation against the Waldensians was conducted in the diocese of Passau, and the testimonies obtained were used by one of the anonymous investigators to provide a detailed description of their doctrine, although the detailed course and results of this investigation remain unknown.

Only at the beginning of the 14th century did German bishops undertake a more vigorous action against heretics. From 1311 to 1315 and again around 1338, numerous trials and executions of Waldensians took place in Austria. In 1336, the same sect was discovered in Brandenburg. Slightly earlier in Germany, hunts for alleged adherents of the so-called Brethren of the Free Spirit began, condemned by the decree of the Council of Vienne, Ad nostrum. Most likely, there never existed any unified brotherhood or association professing such heresy; rather, the term referred simply to a certain group of unorthodox views attributed mainly to members of secular religious associations of uncertain canonical status (such as Beguines and Beghards) and various religious eccentrics. The first persecution of the Brethren of the Free Spirit sect took place in Strasbourg from 1317 to 1319 under the leadership of the local bishop, John Dirpheim. Trials also took place in other locations, including Cologne (1326), Metz (1335), Magdeburg (1336), Constance (1339), Salzburg (1340), and Würzburg (1342).

All the aforementioned persecutions were the work of episcopal courts. For over a hundred years after 1233, not a single case of appointing a papal inquisitor in Germany is known, even though Poland and Bohemia further east had papal inquisitors as early as 1318, and Hungary from 1327. Perhaps an explanation for this could be the fact that Emperor Louis IV (died 1347) pursued a policy hostile to the papacy and for a time even supported the Antipope Nicholas V (1328–1330). It was only after Charles IV ascended to the throne in 1348 that relations between the papacy and the empire warmed. In the same year, a tribunal of the papal inquisition was established in Germany.

== From 1348 to the 16th century ==
=== Papal Inquisition ===
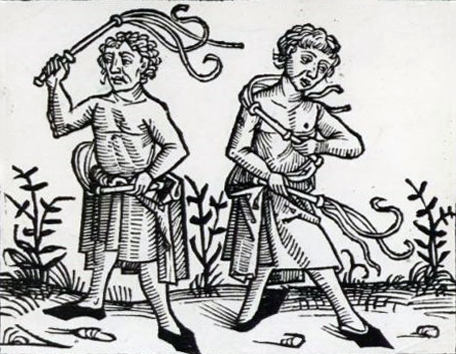
15th century woodcut depicting flagellants

In 1348, Pope Clement VI appointed Dominican friar Johann Schadland from the Strasbourg convent as the inquisitor for Germany. His nomination was confirmed by Pope Innocent VI in 1353, with a specific mandate to combat doctrinal errors spreading among the Beghards communities. However, it's hard to gauge how seriously the papacy regarded the threat of heresy, given that Schadland was appointed as the sole inquisitor for the entire Germany. Despite his determination in raising funds for organizing the tribunal, there are very few records of his actual anti-heretical activity. He did not receive financial or organizational support from the German episcopal conference or secular authorities. Eventually, in 1359, Pope Innocent VI appointed him as the Bishop of Chełmno, without naming a successor to the inquisitorial position.

The true architect of the papal inquisition in Germany was Pope Urban V, who in 1364 appointed four Dominican inquisitors: Walter Kerlinger for Saxony, Heinrich Agro for the Archdiocese of Mainz, Ludwig de Caliga for the Archdioceses of Cologne and Trier, and John de Moneta for the Archdiocese of Salzburg. Similar to Schadland, their task was to combat the Brethren of the Free Spirit, mainly among the Beghards and Beguines. Walter Kerlinger, in particular, demonstrated great zeal in his role. From 1367 to 1369 in Erfurt, he punished over 200 Beghards and Beguines, expelled an equal number from the city, and led trials in other locations as well. His actions received significant support from Emperor Charles IV, who issued several edicts in 1369 supporting the inquisition.

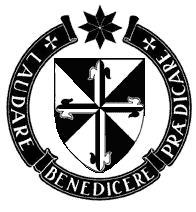
Coat of arms of the Dominican Order

In 1372, Pope Gregory XI authorized the provincial prior of the Dominican province of Teutonia (southern and western Germany) to appoint inquisitors (up to five) throughout Germany, including areas under the province of Saxony (northern and eastern Germany and Livonia). This decision marked the culmination of the formation of permanent structures of the papal inquisition in Germany.

Despite the emperor's support, the activities of the inquisitors against the Beghards and Beguines faced numerous protests from clergy and laity who believed the accusations against these communities were unjust. In response to these protests, Pope Gregory XI issued papal bulls in 1374 and 1377, recommending great caution in trials against members of these associations, emphasizing that most of them were good and devout Catholics, with only a few falling into doctrinal errors. These bulls coincided almost perfectly with the death of Walter Kerlinger (1373), leading to a significant decline in papal inquisition activities for several years.

The papal inquisition's activities saw a resurgence during the pontificate of Pope Boniface IX (1389–1404). Once again, there were trials of alleged supporters of the Brethren of the Free Spirit in Austria, Cologne, and Mecklenburg. The inquisitor of Saxony, Eylard Schöneveld, showed particular activity, burning four individuals in several Baltic cities from 1402 to 1403. However, in the persecution of the Waldensians in eastern and southern Germany during Boniface IX's reign, papal inquisitors hardly participated, except for the trials in Mainz in 1389 and Strasbourg in 1400.

In 1399, Boniface IX reorganized the papal inquisition office in Germany, authorizing each Dominican provincial from Saxony to appoint up to six inquisitors in their province, whereas until then, only the provincial of Teutonia had the right to nominate, and that no more than five throughout Germany. Nonetheless, in 1409, the Teutonia provincial still appointed an inquisitor in the Saxony province, citing Gregory XI's bull from 1372. The earliest traces of such authorization by the Saxony provincial date back to the second half of the 15th century.

In 1414, inquisitor Heinrich Schöneveld presided over the trials of 84 members of the millenarian sect of flagellants in Sangerhausen, Thuringia. He sentenced three individuals to death, while others received penitential measures as they renounced heresy. After the departure of the inquisitor, local authorities disregarded his judgments, burning all heretics at the stake and organizing a hunt for their supporters in the area. In total, at least 168 individuals (perhaps even around 300) were burned at the stake by secular courts that year in Thuringia.

The Council of Constance, held between 1414 and 1418, defended the communities of Beguines and Beghards, definitively putting an end to their persecutions. Trials against alleged followers of the Brethren of the Free Spirit sporadically occurred until 1458, but they only concerned individual religious eccentrics, not larger groups or communities.

A much more significant decision made by the Council of Constance was the condemnation of Hussitism. During its sessions, two leaders of this movement, Jan Hus and Jerome of Prague, were burned at the stake. Throughout the 15th century, many missionaries from Bohemia attempted to spread Hussite views in Germany. Additionally, in the east, after the period of persecution from 1389 to 1404, Waldensian communities re-emerged, which, in fact, established friendly relations with the Czech Hussites. Paradoxically, however, papal inquisitors hardly participated in combating Hussites and Waldensians. The only significant anti-heretical actions by the papal inquisition after the Council of Constance were the trials of flagellants in Nordhausen in 1434 and 1446, as well as in Thuringia in 1454. Furthermore, in 1425, for several years, the inquisitorial office in the Archbishopric of Mainz was taken away from the Dominicans for reasons unknown, and Pope Martin V appointed John Lagenator, a professor at the Heidelberg University, as inquisitor.

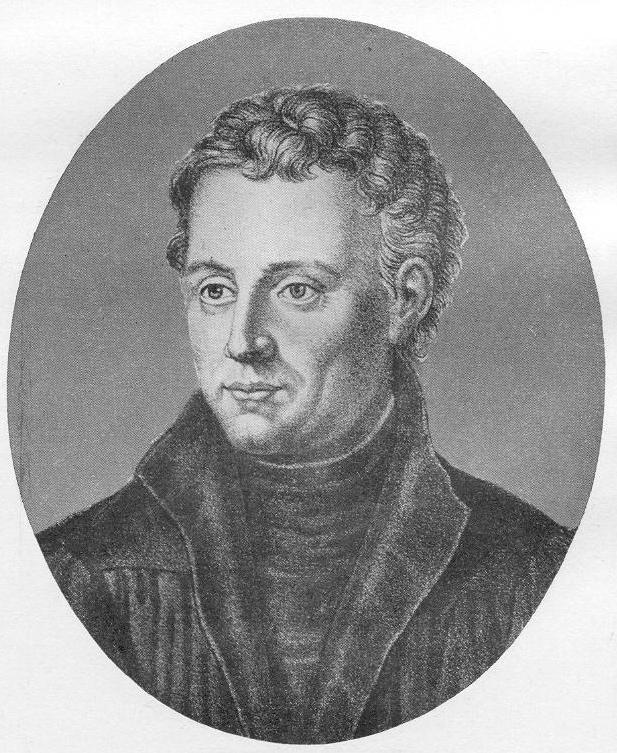
Johannes Reuchlin

In the second half of the 15th century, the activity of the papal inquisition in Germany almost completely ceased. Although the authorities of the Dominican Order regularly made appointments, and the number of inquisitors even increased compared to the previous period, most of them treated the inquisitorial office solely as an honorary distinction and did not engage in any anti-heretical activities. Almost all German inquisitors of this period were simultaneously priors of convents, vicars of the order's "nations", (Note: "Nations" were referred to as groups of convents in some area smaller than a religious province. The vicar of a "nation" was the head of such a group of convents.) university professors, and even provincial superiors of the order, often combining several such functions. (Note: For example, Jacob Sprenger was from 1481 to 1488 simultaneously inquisitor, dean of the theological faculty of the University of Cologne, prior of the Cologne convent and vicar first of the "Brabant nation" and then (from 1485) of the entire province of Teutonia. After 1488, he combined the office of inquisitor with that of provincial of Teutonia.) Some, such as Gerhard von Elten and Jacob Sprenger, were involved in the internal reform of the Dominican Order. The two most famous of the few heresy trials conducted by papal inquisitors in the last 50 years before Martin Luther's emergence, namely the trial of John Rucherat in 1479 (inquisitor Gerhard von Elten) and the trial of Johann Reuchlin in 1513 (inquisitor Jacob van Hoogstraaten), were instances of university professors exploiting the inquisitorial office to settle scores with opponents in the academic-scientific environment. These trials, especially the trial of Reuchlin, significantly diminished the prestige of the papal inquisition in Germany.

An exception in terms of inquisitorial zeal was Heinrich Kramer, appointed in 1479 as an inquisitor in the Upper German district. (Note: The district included the southern part of the metropolis of Mainz (excluding the Diocese of Chur), the eastern part of the metropolis of Salzburg and the diocese of Basel.) He was a staunch advocate of the theory of the reality and universality of witchcraft crimes and attempted to unleash witch-hunts first in the Diocese of Constance (from 1481 to 1484) and then in the Tyrolean Diocese of Brixen (1485). However, these initiatives did not receive the expected support from local authorities. Kramer, who had previously distinguished himself in polemics with conciliarists, defending the authority of the Apostolic See, managed to obtain the support of Pope Innocent VIII (papal bull Summis desiderantes affectibus of 5 December 1484), and in 1486/1487, he wrote and published the book Malleus Maleficarum, a handbook for witch hunters. Kramer's activities were an exception, and he soon came into conflict with the religious authorities, who condemned him in 1490 for various offenses.

In 1515, in the north-western part of the Empire, a new Dominican provincial territory, Lower Germany (Germania Inferioris), was established, which later, by 1525, became a separate unit in the territorial structures of the papal inquisition. In 1542, the provincial of Lower Germany received from the Pope the right to appoint inquisitors in several Dutch dioceses.

Martin Luther's appearance in 1517 occurred at a time when the papal inquisition had, for over half a century, essentially not been prosecuting heretics, and its prestige in the German lands, in connection with the trial of the humanist Johannes Reuchlin, was close to zero. The publication of the pamphlet Epistolæ Obscurorum Virorum in 1516 mocked inquisitors as backward individuals, contrasting them with "modern" humanists, including Reuchlin. Also, the activities of the indulgence preacher Johann Tetzel, who was an inquisitor in Poland, weakened the prestige and position of this institution. These circumstances, as well as the lack of sufficient organizational support, meant that the German inquisition was unable to react to Luther's appearance.

=== Episcopal Inquisition ===
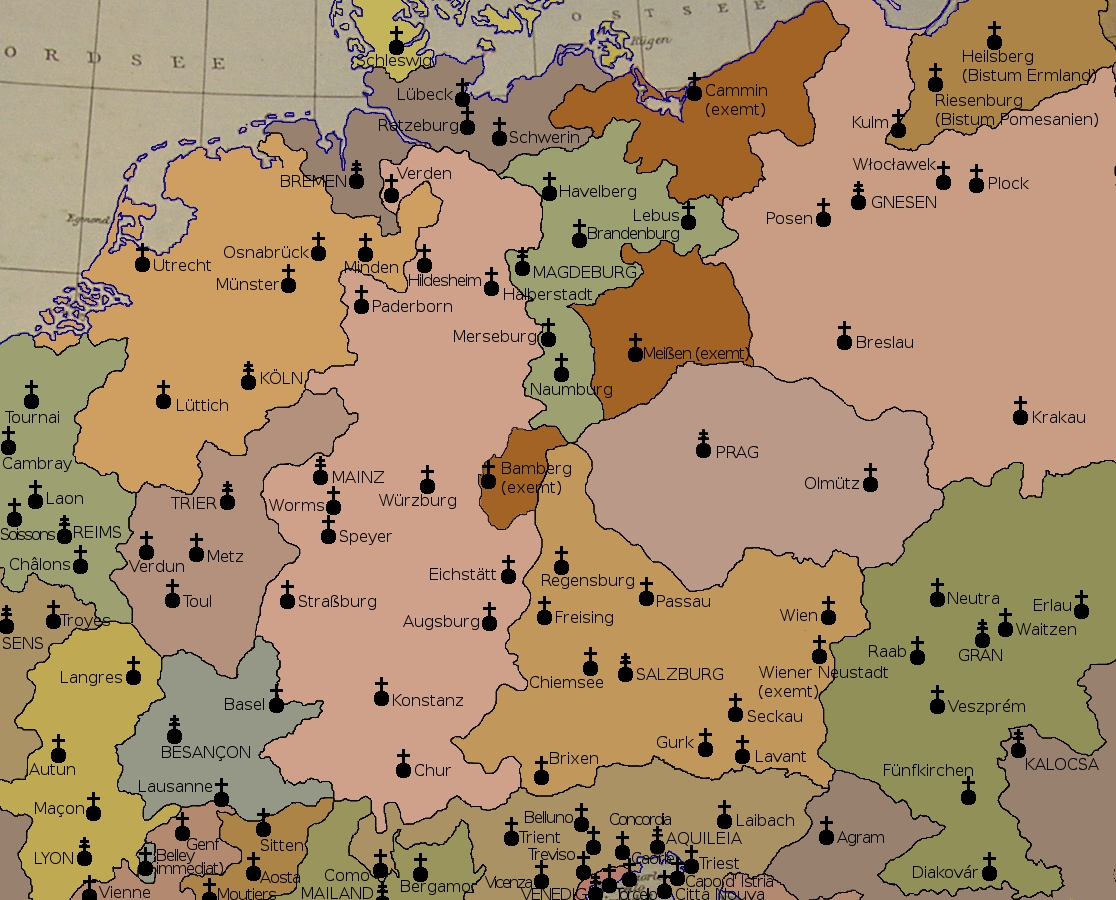
Dioceses and ecclesiastical provinces in Germany circa 1500

The establishment of the papal inquisition did not weaken the anti-heretical activities of German bishops and their delegated diocesan inquisitors. In 1350, the inquisitors of the Archbishop of Magdeburg sentenced the Beghard Konstantin to death. In the 1360s, the inquisitor Henry of Olomouc conducted many trials against Austrian Waldensians in the Passau diocese, and in 1378/1379, persecutions of Waldensians also took place in Nuremberg (Bamberg diocese). In 1374, at the initiative of the Bishop of Strasbourg, Lambert, an investigation was conducted against Beguines, which also affected Franciscan and Dominican third order.

In the 1380s, large-scale persecutions of Waldensians began in eastern and southern Germany, reaching their peak in the next decade. They were mainly the work of two itinerant inquisitors: Peter Zwicker of the Celestine Order and Priest Martin of Amberg from the Prague diocese. Martin began his career in Regensburg in 1381 as an inquisitor delegated by the Archbishop of Prague, Jan, who served as papal legate in this region. He then conducted trials against Waldensians in Würzburg, Erfurt, Bamberg, Bohemia, and on the Austro-Hungarian border (until 1401). Peter Zwicker initially collaborated with Martin in Erfurt in 1391, then conducted investigations in Pomerania (from 1392 to 1394), Austria (from 1391 to 1403, intermittently), and Hungary (1400/1401). These investigations covered several thousand suspects, who were generally treated fairly leniently, although in Erfurt in 1391 and in Steyr, Austria, in 1397, many Waldensians were burned at the stake. These inquisitors, although operating in many dioceses, never had papal mandate for their actions. Probably, the catalyst for this campaign was the fairly numerous conversions among Waldensian leaders in the 1380s. Obtaining information from them about the faithful in many regions, Peter Zwicker and Martin of Amberg moved from diocese to diocese, each time seeking authorization from the local bishop, but in fact, these persecutions were their grassroots initiative. Under their influence, Archbishop of Mainz, Conrad von Weinsberg, also ordered investigations in his diocese (process in Bingen in 1392), as did Bishop Friedrich von Öttingen of Eichstätt (1395), and in the Augsburg diocese, Heinrich Angermeier undertook inquisitorial activity on his own initiative (though with the approval of the local bishop) from 1393 to 1394.

Similarly to the Waldensians, the efforts to counter the influence of Hussitism in Germany after the Council of Constance were almost exclusively undertaken by episcopal courts. In the 1420s, in Regensburg, Magdeburg, Wurzburg, and Speyer, several Hussite missionaries were captured and burned, but generally, this movement did not gain broader support in Germany. On the other hand, German Waldensian communities established friendly contacts with Czech Hussites, as evidenced by the proceedings conducted by the bishops' inquisitors in Würzburg (1446), Brandenburg (1458 and 1478/1480), Strasbourg (1458), Eichstätt (1460), the Naumburg diocese (1462), and Vienna (1468). In 1481, in the Halberstadt diocese, there was also probably the last flagellant trial in history.

== Reformation ==
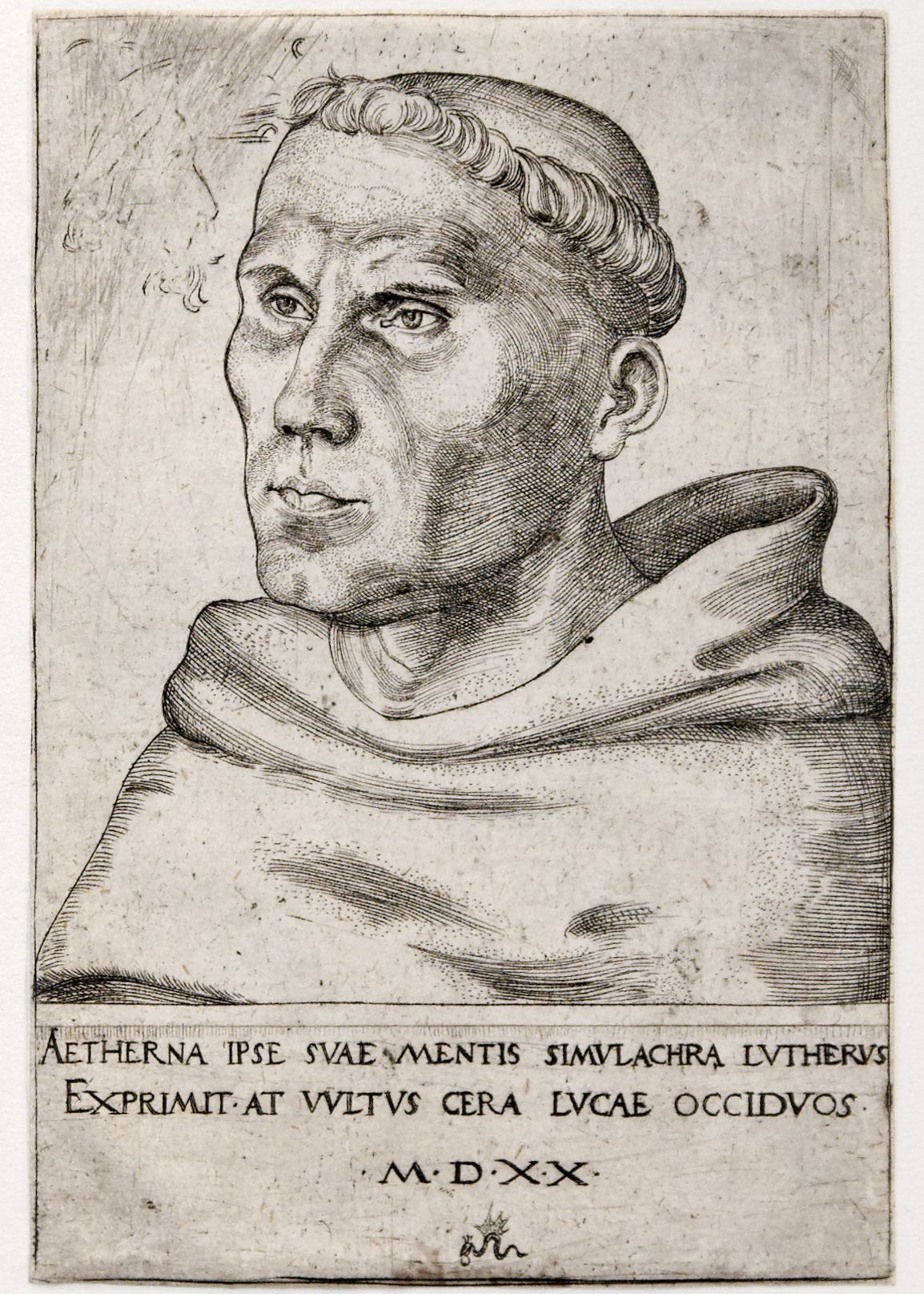
The Reformation, initiated by Martin Luther, put an effective end to the Inquisition in Germany

Initiated by Martin Luther in 1517, the Reformation marked the effective end of the inquisition's activities in German lands. Many of them (including the Electorates of Saxony, the Palatinate, and Brandenburg, the Duchies of Mecklenburg and Pomerania, Hesse, etc.) embraced Protestantism, secularized church property, and dissolved monasteries, including the Dominican Order upon which the inquisition was based. Conversely, in Catholic countries (Austria, Bavaria), repression against heretics by the late 1520s shifted to secular courts, replacing the weak and inefficient ecclesiastical judiciary. Dominican inquisitors were regularly appointed for the three Rhenish metropolises (residing in Cologne) but these appointments were also discontinued in the second half of the 16th century.

In the Netherlands (Germania Inferioris), the monastic authorities appointed titular inquisitors until the end of the 16th century, with the last two dying in 1608. However, after Emperor Charles V established the state-church Dutch Inquisition between 1522 and 1525, they played no role in combating heresy.

The actual abolition of the inquisition in Germany in the first half of the 16th century by no means ushered in religious tolerance. The transfer of heresy cases to secular courts initially led to a significant increase in the intensity and brutality of persecutions of heretics in some German territories, on a scale unknown in previous centuries. Although the repression utterly failed against the major currents of the Reformation, which gained the support of many princes and cities, many members of the radical Anabaptist sect fell victim to persecution. Emperor Charles V Habsburg ordered them to be punished with death as rebels, regardless of their eventual repentance. From 1527 to 1618, secular courts in Germany sentenced approximately 850 Anabaptists to death, with nearly 80% being burned in Austria and Tyrol between 1527 and 1533. A small portion of these executions took place in regions that embraced the Reformation. These repressions gradually waned after the Peace of Augsburg in 1555. However, even then, Germany did not become a country without stakes. Starting around 1560, Germany became the main area for witch-hunts for nearly two hundred years, claiming at least 20,000 victims, far more than the persecutions of heretics in this country by the inquisition, episcopal courts, and secular courts combined over the previous five hundred years. However, the papal inquisition had no involvement in this, and in the 17th century, the Roman Holy Office even intervened to mitigate these processes in Catholic German countries and Switzerland.

== Statistics of trials and executions ==
=== Trials of the papal inquisition ===
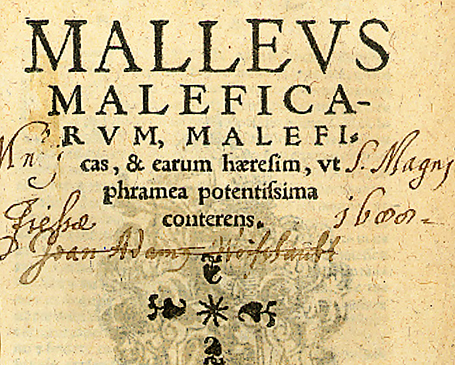
Title page of the book Malleus Maleficarum by Inquisitor Heinrich Kramer (1520 edition)

The number of judgments by the papal inquisition in Germany, as in other regions, is difficult to ascertain due to the insufficient number of sources. Information about the activity of the first inquisitor, Konrad von Marburg, is almost exclusively vague, mentioning a "great number burned", and that many falsely confessed to avoid the death penalty. Those who confessed were spared their lives, but their heads were shaved as a sign of shame. The only specific numerical data refers to four heretics burned in Erfurt in May 1232 and about 50 individuals absolved and rehabilitated by the synod in Frankfurt in 1234, who had previously been sentenced by Konrad. One chronicle suggests that he burned around a thousand accused, but this number cannot be verified and is likely exaggerated.

There is no information suggesting that Inquisitor Johann Schadland ever participated in processes against heretics. However, it is probable that the re-trial of the Beghard Bertold von Rohrbach in 1356, resulting in his burning at the stake, was conducted by him or possibly his vicar.

Regarding the inquisitors appointed in 1364, more information is available only about the activities of Walter Kerlinger. In the trials against the Beguines and Beghards in Erfurt from 1367 to 1369, he burned three individuals, imposed penances on over two hundred, and around another two hundred fled the city. In 1369, he arrested 40 Beguines and Beghards in Nordhausen, of whom 7 were sentenced to death. Henry Agro is only known to have burned the Beguine Meta von Westhove in Strasbourg in 1366. Likewise, Ludwig Caliga excommunicated one heretical priest in Soest and may have acted against Beguines and Beghards in Cologne, but no further details are known.

Inquisitor Johannes Arnoldi presided over the trial of 18 Waldensians in Mainz in 1389, who renounced heresy and accepted the penance imposed by him. He previously participated in the trials against Hartmann der Birman in Strasbourg (1384) and Jan Müsinger in Ulm (1385), who also renounced heresy. His successor, Nikolaus Böckeler, in 1391 conducted a trial against Jan Malkaw in Strasbourg, who was ultimately sentenced to exile; the trial had a political character, its real reason being that Malkaw supported Pope Boniface IX, while the inquisitor supported Antipope Clement VII. In 1400, the same inquisitor arrested 32 Waldensians and one Beguine in Strasbourg; one Waldensian was burned, while the remaining accused received penitential sentences or were expelled from the city. Perhaps the executions of Beguines and Beghards in Heidelberg around 1393, known only through a chance mention in the records of another trial, were also carried out by Böckeler. (Note: Heidelberg lay within Böckeler's jurisdiction, and those burned belonged to the sect of Nicholas of Basel. All other known trials against this sect were conducted by papal inquisitors, not bishops.)

In 1393, Inquisitor Alexander of Cologne burned one Beghard, and three years later in Vienna, John Stauder sentenced three of his associates to death, including the sect leader Nicholas of Basel, although one managed to escape. Similarly, in Rostock in 1394, Helike Pors was burned for heresy; the verdict was most likely issued by Inquisitor Dietrich Kolle. Inquisitor Eylard Schöneveld burned four individuals in various Baltic cities from 1402 to 1403. His relative Heinrich Schöneveld burned a Waldensian, Jakob Schröder, in Brandenburg in 1411, and in 1414, he burned three out of 84 individuals tried for belonging to the Flagellant sect in Sangerhausen, imposing penances on the others. However, after his departure, local authorities organized massacres of the suspects both in Sangerhausen and the surrounding area, burning both those sentenced to death and penitents on the stakes (in total, at least 168 individuals).

Jakob von Soest presided over the trial of priest John Palborne in 1421, who was accused of heresy for criticizing the privileges of mendicant orders. The case nearly reached the papal curia, but Palborne was ultimately treated leniently. Inquisitor John of Frankfurt, from the Metropolis of Mainz, sentenced the Hussite Jan Fuyger to death in Würzburg in 1429. Inquisitor Heinrich Kalteisen burned one Beghard in Mainz in 1458 and earlier, around 1435, condemned one woman in absentia as an adept of black magic.

In 1434 and again in 1446, trials against Flagellants were held in Nordhausen. In the first trial, Inquisitor Konrad von Westhausen did not sentence anyone to death, while in the second trial, Inquisitor Friedrich Müller burned 12 out of 13 accused. The same inquisitor burned two heretics in Göttingen in 1453, after a prior public debate with them, and a year later, he participated in trials of Flagellants in Stolberg and probably in Sangerhausen as well, where a total of 52 individuals were burned. However, scant sources suggest that these persecutions were mainly inspired by secular authorities.

In 1479, Inquisitor Gerhard von Elten of Cologne presided over the trial of Jan Rucherat, who was sentenced to imprisonment. In 1477, Inquisitor Johannes Krawinckel of Dortmund accused someone named Hovet of heresy, but the trial did not proceed because Bishop Heinrich von Schwarzenburg of Münster refused to cooperate with him. Several years later, the vicar of this inquisitor sentenced an alleged witch to the stake in Osnabrück.

Inquisitor Heinrich Kramer, who became famous as a witch hunter and author of the Malleus Maleficarum, claimed that between 1481 and 1486 he burned 48 witches mainly in the diocese of Konstanz, and in 1491 he stated that he judged over 200 witches. Preserved documentation confirms a trial in Ravensburg in 1484, where Kramer accused eight people of witchcraft, two of whom were burned, and proceedings in Innsbruck in 1485. There, Kramer arrested seven women, but due to the intervention of the Bishop of Brixen, no convicting verdict was issued. Slightly earlier, in 1480 in Augsburg, Kramer accused a local canon and a "beguine" of heresy, but failed to prove their guilt.

Jakob van Hoogstraten, the inquisitor of Cologne, in 1512 sentenced the heretic Hermann von Rysswick to the stake, a "repeat offender", whom the inquisitor of Utrecht, Jan van Ommaten, absolved in 1502. However, the most famous trial involving this inquisitor was the trial of the renowned humanist and Hebraist Johannes Reuchlin, conducted in 1513. As a result of an appeal to Rome, Reuchlin was acquitted, which was a severe blow to Hoogstraten, but the inquisitor managed to have the trial reopened. Ultimately, the entire affair ended with the condemnation of Reuchlin's works by Pope Leo X in 1520, but the only punishment for the author was a gag order and the obligation to pay the trial costs; formally, he was not recognized as a heretic. The same inquisitor in 1525 burned Willem Dirksz in Utrecht, a supporter of Martin Luther.

The inquisitor of Cologne, Konrad Köllin, sentenced to death at least five people accused of supporting the Reformation (two in 1529 and three in 1533).

The following list contains documented executions of heretics in Germany from the judgments of papal inquisitors:

Year	Place	Inquisitor	Number of executed	Description of convicts
1232	Erfurt	Konrad von Marburg	4	
1356	Speyer	Probably Johann Schadland	1	Bertold von Rohrbach burned as a follower of Brethren of the Free Spirit heresy
1366	Strasburg	Henryk Agro	1	Beguine Meta von Westhove burned as a follower of Brethren of the Free Spirit heresy
1368	Erfurt	Walter Kerlinger	1	Beghard Jan Hartmann burned as a follower of Brethren of the Free Spirit heresy
1369	Nordhausen	Walter Kerlinger	7	Beghards burned as followers of Brethren of the Free Spirit heresy
1369	Erfurt	Walter Kerlinger	2	Beghards burned as followers of Brethren of the Free Spirit heresy
1393	Cologne	Alexander	1	Beghard Martin from Mainz burned as a follower of Brethren of the Free Spirit heresy
1394	Rostock	Probably Dietrich Kolle	1	Helike Pors burned as a heretic; detailed accusations against her are unknown
1396	Vienna	Jan Stauder	2	Beghards Nicholas from Basel and his disciple Jan burned as followers of Brethren of the Free Spirit heresy
1400	Strasbourg	Nikolaus Böckeler	1	Waldensian Jan Roher
1402	Lübeck	Eylard Schöneveld	1	Beghard Wilhelm burned as a follower of Brethren of the Free Spirit heresy
1403	Wismar	Eylard Schöneveld	1	Beghard Bernard burned as a follower of Brethren of the Free Spirit heresy
1403	Stralsund	Eylard Schöneveld	1	Father Nicholas Ville burned for unknown heretical views
1403	Rostock	Eylard Schöneveld	1	Woman burned as a heretic (further details unknown)
1411	Brandenburg	Heinrich Schöneveld	1	Waldensian Jakob Schröder
1414	Sangerhausen	Heinrich Schöneveld	3	Flagellants
1429	Würzburg	Jan of Frankfurt	1	Hussite Jan Fuyger
1446	Nordhausen	Friedrich Müller	12	Flagellants
1453	Göttingen	Friedrich Müller	2	Flagellants burned after a public dispute with the inquisitor
1454	Stolberg	Friedrich Müller	30	Flagellants
1454	Sangerhausen	Friedrich Müller	22	Flagellants
1458	Mainz	Heinrich Kalteisen, Archbishop Nidaros	1	Beghard Hans Becker burned as a follower of Brethren of the Free Spirit heresy
1481–1486	Diocese of Konstanz	Heinrich Kramer	48	People accused of witchcraft, including Anna von Mindelhym and Agnes Baderin, burned in Ravensburg in 1484
1490	Osnabrück	Vicar of inquisitor Johannes Krawinckel	1	Woman burned as a witch
1512	The Hague	Jakob van Hoogstraten	1	Averroist Hermann von Rysswick
1525	Utrecht	Jakob van Hoogstraten	1	Willem Dirksz burned as a supporter of the Reformation
1529	Cologne	Konrad Köllin	2	Adolf Clarenbach and Peter von Flysteden burned as supporters of the Reformation
1533	Cologne	Konrad Köllin	3	Two men and one woman executed as supporters of the Reformation

=== Trials of the episcopal inquisition ===
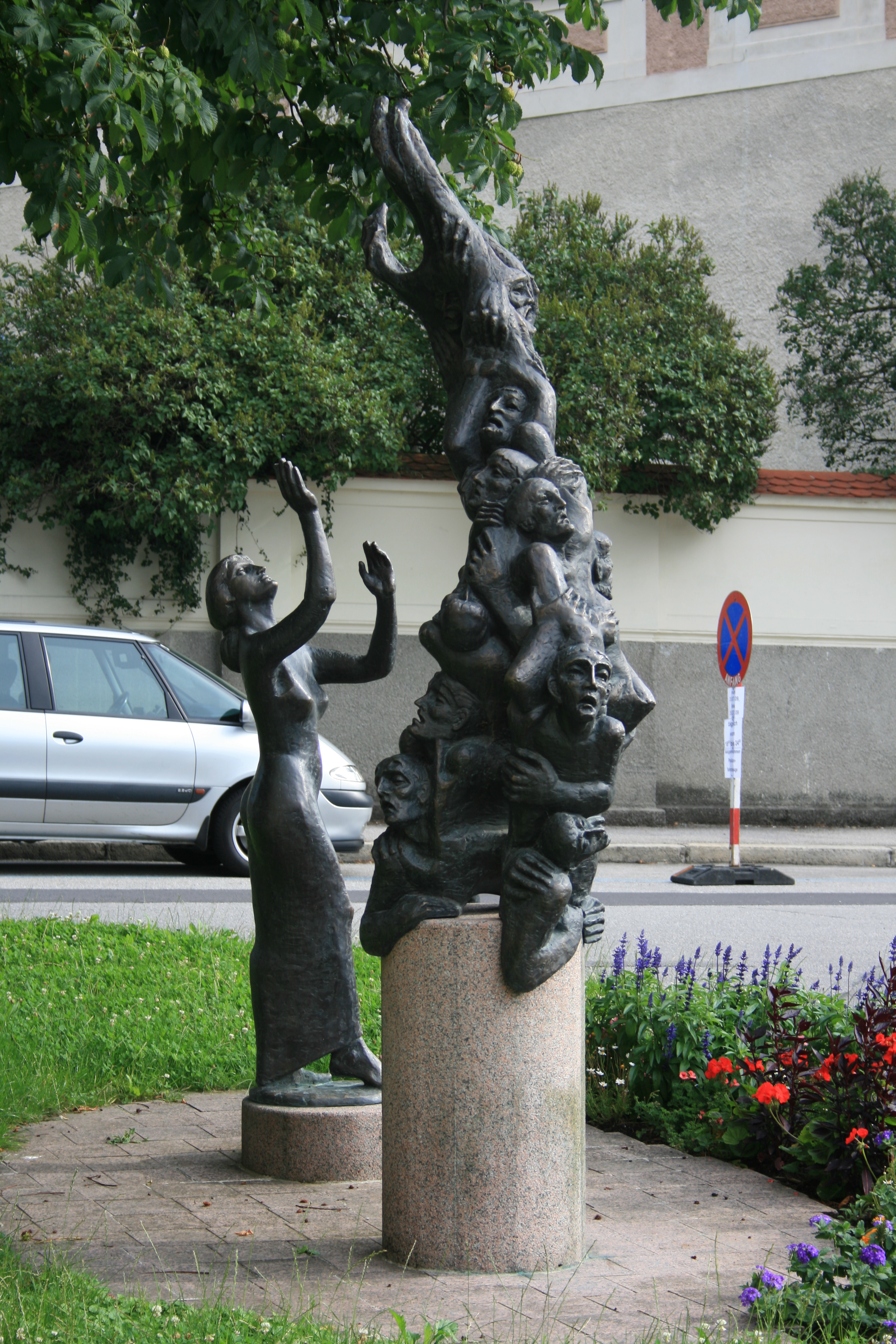
Monument commemorating the persecution of the Waldensians in Steyr, Austria in 1397

Bishop courts in Germany issued significantly more verdicts in cases of heresy than papal inquisitors, but even in their case, the preserved data is fragmentary and not always precise.

The proceedings conducted by Bishop Heinrich of Strasbourg in 1212 encompassed around 500 suspects. Four hundred of them voluntarily renounced heresy, while the remaining hundred denied the charges and were subjected to trials by ordeal. Eighty of them failed the trial, prompting the bishop to order their burning at the stake. Over the next twenty years, stakes with heretics also ignited in Hildesheim (1225, one executed), again in Strasbourg (1229, one burned), and in Trier (1231, three burned). However, nothing is known about the results of proceedings against Waldensians in the Passau diocese around 1266.

During the persecution of Waldensians in Austria from 1311 to 1315 by the bishop of Passau, at least 39 people were burned, including a heretical bishop. Unfortunately, the chronicles do not provide the number of penitents who received milder punishments. Even less information has survived about the subsequent wave of repression against Waldensians around 1338. The chronicles only mention that "many" heretics were burned, while others submitted to the Church.

In the investigation against Beghards and Beguines in Strasbourg from 1317 to 1319, a large but unspecified number of suspects were punished, with exile likely being the harshest penalty. In 1326, Archbishop Heinrich von Virneburg of Cologne arrested about 50 "Beghards" whom he accused of professing the Brethren of the Free Spirit heresy. Most of them submitted to the Church, renounced heresy, and received penitential sentences. Out of the nine who stubbornly defended their beliefs, eight were sentenced to "perpetual imprisonment", and the sect leader, Walter Lollard, was burned at the stake. In 1336, in Angermünde in the Brandenburg diocese, 14 Waldensians were burned based on the judgment of the bishop's inquisitor Jordan of Quedlinburg. In the same year, an investigation against adherents of the Brethren of the Free Spirit heresy was conducted by Archbishop Otto of Magdeburg, but in this case, all suspects submitted to the Church. In 1339, the bishop of Constance sentenced three Beghards to prison, and three years later, a similar sentence was imposed on two Beghards by the bishop of Würzburg. In 1340, Father Rudolf was burned in Salzburg, and ten years later, in Erfurt, the vicar of the Archbishop of Mainz burned "Beghard" Konstantin. Slightly earlier, in 1334, an unknown number of heretics were burned in Metz based on the judgments of the bishop's inquisitor Waryn.

In Nuremberg (Bamberg diocese) during the 14th century, there were regular trials of Waldensians. In 1332, 90 members of this sect were expelled from the city. In 1378, one Waldensian was burned, and 93 received penitential sentences. The following year, another trial resulted in the burning of 7 individuals, 11 were ordered to wear penitential crosses, and 19 fled the city and were condemned in absentia. Seven more Waldensians were burned on the orders of Bishop's inquisitor Martin of Amberg in 1399, who also reconciled with the Church an unspecified number of Nuremberg heretics.

Data regarding the great campaign against Waldensians at the end of the 14th century is incomplete, but it indicates it was the largest anti-heretical campaign in German history. In Pomerania from 1392 to 1394, Peter Zwicker judged a total of 443 suspects, all of whom renounced heresy and accepted penances imposed by the inquisitor. Investigations initiated by the Archbishop of Mainz in Bingen led to 36 executions in 1392. In the Augsburg diocese in 1393, inquisitor Heinrich Angermeier judged around 280 Waldensians, sentencing two to death in Dinkelsbühl and twenty-six in Donauwörth. In Wemding (Eichstätt diocese) the same year, Bishop's inquisitor Bertold burned ten individuals. Investigations in the late 1390s in Thuringia and Bohemia, as well as in Austria and Hungary, resulted in approximately two thousand "reconciliations" of Waldensians with the Catholic Church. Additionally, in 1397 in Steyr, Peter Zwicker burned about a hundred Waldensians, and an unknown number of executions also occurred in 1391 in Erfurt.

Records from the 1390s refer to earlier proceedings conducted by Henry of Olomouc against Waldensians in Austria in the 1360s and by Martin of Amberg in the Regensburg diocese from 1381 to 1387. These mentions do not speak of executions but only of cases where individuals renounced heresy when confronted again by inquisitors.

In the second and third decades of the 15th century, in several German cities, bishop's inquisitors apprehended and sentenced several Hussite missionaries. In 1416, a radical preacher, Nicholas of Dresden, was burned in Meissen. In 1420, subdeacon Jakob Kremer of Verden was burned in Magdeburg. The same year in Regensburg, Henry Grünfeld was burned, and three years later in the same city, Bishop sentenced preacher Henry Rathgeber to death. In 1424 in Worms, three Hussites were captured, of whom one (Jan Drändorf) was burned, the second denied his beliefs and received absolution (Martin Borchard), and the third (Peter Turnau) escaped from prison. However, he was later captured in Speyer in 1426 and burned by the local bishop's court. Presumably, imprecise references to heretic trials in the Constance diocese in the 1430s involve Hussites; at least two itinerant preachers were burned there along with their supporters.

In 1446, the Bishop of Würzburg reconciled as many as 130 Waldensians with the Church. Similar success was achieved by the proceedings led by the Bishop of Eichstätt, who absolved 27 Waldensians in 1460. In Strasbourg in 1458, Hussite preacher Henry Reiser and his associate Anna Weiler were burned, but the rest of his followers renounced heresy. In Brandenburg in 1458, three Hussite clergy were captured, two of whom renounced heresy, and one (Matthew Hagen) was burned in Berlin. The investigation was conducted by Bishop's inquisitor Jan Canneman, who then interrogated residents of Angermünde suspected of heresy. As all of them submitted to the Church, no death sentences were issued there. From 1478 to 1480, there were again trials in this region, resulting in the burning of eleven Hussites. Additionally, in 1468 in Vienna, Hussite Bishop Stephen of Basel was burned.

The fate of the flagellants, captured in 1481 by Count of Anhalt and handed over to the court of the Bishop of Halberstadt, is unknown.

=== Executions of heretics by verdicts of council courts ===
Year	Council	Burned heretic
1415	Council of Constance	Jan Hus
1416	Council of Constance	Jerome of Prague
1446	Council of Basel	Nikolaus von Buldesdorf

== Bibliography ==
- Decker, Rainer (2010). Witchcraft & The Papacy. An account drawing on the formerly secret records of the Roman Inquisition. Charlottesville & London: University of Virginia Press. ISBN 978-0-8139-2748-0.
- Flade, Paul (1902). Das römische Inquisitionsverfahren in Deutschland bis zu den Hexenprozessen (in German). Leipzig: Dietrich'sche Verlags-Buchhandlung Theodor Weicher.
- Haupt, Herman (1889). "Waldenserthum und Inquisition im südostlichen Deutschland bis zur Mitte des 14. Jahrhunderts". Deutsche Zeitschrift für Geschichtswissenschaft (in German) (1).
- Haupt, Herman (1890). "Waldenserthum und Inquisition im südostlichen Deutschland seit der Mitte des 14. Jahrhunderts". Deutsche Zeitschrift für Geschichtswissenschaft (in German) (3).
- De Jonghe, Bernard (1719). Belgium Dominicanum (in German). Brussels.
- Kaltner, Baltasar (1882). Konrad von Marburg und die Inquisition in Deutschland (in German). Prague: Verlag von F. Tempsky.
- Kieckhefer, Richard (1979). Repression of Heresy in Medieval Germany. Liverpool: Liverpool University Press. ISBN 0-85323-134-6.
- Kras, Paweł (2006). Ad abolendam diversarum haeresium pravitatem. System inkwizycyjny w średniowiecznej Europie (in Polish). Lublin: Wydawnictwo KUL. ISBN 83-7363-431-2.
- Lambert, Malcolm (2002). Średniowieczne herezje (in Polish). Gdańsk-Warsaw: MARABUT. ISBN 83-916989-5-5.
- Lambert, Malcolm (1998). The Cathars. Wiley-Blackwell. ISBN 9780631209591.
- Lea, Henry Charles (1888). A History of the Inquisition of the Middle Ages. Vol. I–III. London – New York: MacMillan Co.
- Lerner, Robert (2007). The Heresy of the Free Spirit in the Middle Ages. University of Notre Dame Press. ISBN 978-0-268-01094-2.
- Monter, William (2002). "Heresy executions in the Reformation Europe". In Grell, Ole Peter; Scribner, Robert W. (eds.). Tolerance and Intolerance in the European Reformation. Cambridge: Cambridge University Press. ISBN 9780521894128.
- Praedicatores Inquisitores. Vol. 1: The Dominican and the Mediaeval Inquisition. Acts of the 1st International Seminar on the Dominicans and the Inquisition (Rome; 23-25 February 2002) (in Italian). Rome: Istituto Storico Domenicano. 2004.
  - Segl, Peter (2004). "Dominikaner und Inquisition im Heiligen Römischen Reich". Praedicatores Inquisitores. Vol. 1: The Dominican and the Mediaeval Inquisition. Acts of the 1st International Seminar on the Dominicans and the Inquisition (Rome; 23-25 February 2002) (in Italian). Rome: Istituto Storico Domenicano.
  - Springer, Klaus-Bernward (2004). "Dominican Inquisition in the Archdiocese of Mainz (1348–1520)". Praedicatores Inquisitores. Vol. 1: The Dominican and the Mediaeval Inquisition. Acts of the 1st International Seminar on the Dominicans and the Inquisition (Rome; 23-25 February 2002) (in Italian). Rome: Istituto Storico Domenicano.
- Schwedt, Hermann (2011). "Kölner Inquisitor Sebastian Knippenberg OP (†1733) auf dem "Index der verbotenen Bücher"". In Finger, Heinz; Haas, Reimund; Scheidgen, Hermann-Josef (eds.). Ortskirche und Weltkirche in der Geschichte: Kölnische Kirchengeschichte zwischen Mittelalter und Zweitem Vatikanum (in German). Cologne – Weimar: Böhlau Verlag. ISBN 9783412208011.
- Wilde, Manfred (2003). Die Zauberei- und Hexenprozesse in Kursachsen (in German). Cologne – Weimar: Böhlau Verlag. ISBN 9783412106027.
