= Anna Roleffes =

Anna Roleffes (c. 1600 − 30 December 1663), better known as Tempel Anneke, was one of the last witches to be executed in Braunschweig, Germany. The complete account of the trial, located in the city of Brunswick archives, is a rare example of an early modern witchcraft prosecution's documentary record being preserved and surviving in its entirety.

== Life and family ==
Tempel Anneke testified that she was born in Harxbüttel, Brunswick, Germany in c. 1600, a few years before a civil war broke out in 1605, when the city refused to recognize the lordship of Duke Heinrich because he was not willing to confirm its traditional privileges. Little is known about her childhood except that she had learned her craft from her mother, who had been a maid to a barber (the surgeons of the time). She had at least two brothers, Heinrich Roleffes of Wenden and Valentin Roleffes of Rohe.

Her nickname is thought to have derived from a public house that was part of the church property called Tempel Hof. The publican at the time of her trial was also known as a Tempel, Tempel Hans (most likely also a nickname). It is possible that Anne provided services to the church or public house and was, like Tempel Hof, also dubbed a Tempel. This, however, is purely speculative; no direct evidence exists to explain the origins of her nickname.

Anne was widowed by her husband, Hans Kage, in 1641, the result of a Thirty years war battle. Poor and dependent, she lived with her son, Hans Kage (named after his father) in Harxbüttel.

== Trial and death ==
Tempel Anneke was in several ways typical of those accused of witchcraft, widowed, poor, female, and dependent. From the testimony, however, she emerges as a far more complex and controversial figure. In particular, she was intelligent and knew her rights, tended to be outspoken, and she could read and owned books. She also had acquired medically relevant skills and had learned pharmaceutical (herbal) knowledge from her mother.

There is no evidence to indicate that the trial was part of mass witch hunts typical of this period, but her trial does offer many significant insights into the workings of 17th-century law and justice, particularly the use of inquisition, perceptions of natural and magical causes, and social history.

She was brought in under accusations of causing harm via magic, maleficium. No evidence prior to her torture indicates that Anneke was a diabolist who believed she was doing work for the devil, although she was tried and convicted of both maleficium and diabolism. Historian Peter Morton argues that the introduction of diabolism, combined with maleficium, served as the catalyst behind Tempel Anneke's condemnation and of others' like her.

She was executed by decapitation and her body was burned on 30 December 1663, six months after her arrest. Evidence suggests that inquisitors had been collecting allegations against her for a year prior.
