= Chronicon Wormatiense =

The Chronicon Wormatiense is a fragmentary anonymous Latin chronicle of the city of Worms, Germany. It was probably composed in the last quarter of the 13th century. There is an English translation by David Bachrach.

The original text of the Chronicon does not survive complete. The definitive critical edition, superseding earlier ones, such as the MGH edition, was published by Heinrich Boos in 1893. The most important two manuscripts are a 16th-century codex from Darmstadt and an 18th-century codex from Frankfurt. The edited Chronicon contains a short introductory paragraph on the Merovingian period. Then follows a chronological account of the years 1221–1261 plus comments on 1297 and 1298. The full extent of the original is not known. If the notes on 1297–1298 were added later, then the original may have been completed as early as the 1260s.

The Chronicon combines features of two genres. On the one hand, it resembles a gesta episcoporum, a collection of short biographies of a succession of bishops, a genre which originates with the collection of papal biographies known as the Liber pontificalis. On the other hand, it resembles a municipal history, like the contemporary Annales Wormatienses. In fact, the Chronicon complements the Annales. It is the work of a clergyman written from the perspective of the bishop of Worms, while the Annales is the work of a layman whose perspective is that of the city council. One of the purposes of the anonymous author is to defend the properties, rights and prerogatives of the bishop, and to show that the interests of the citizens are best advanced under the protection of a strong bishop. As in a gesta, documents are frequently cited and sometimes copied or excerpted into the narrative to substantiate a claim. Unlike a gesta, the narrative is not organized by the lives or reigns of the bishops.

The anonymous author of the Chronicon does not leave a personal imprint on his work. He never claims to be an eyewitness or to have received his information from eyewitnesses. Where his citations and quotations of documents can be checked, he proves to be completely accurate. He probably worked for the bishop. The bishops whose reigns he covers are Henry II (1217–1234), Landolf (1234–1247), Richard (1247–1257), and Eberhard (1257–1277). The Chronicon can be divided as follows:

- A notice that Queen Brunhilda of Austrasia (died 613) had stayed at Worms, which had once hosted the "Vangian people".
- A list of the fires that struck Worms in 1221, 1231, 1234, 1242, 1269 and 1298.
- The arrival of itinerant preachers (friars) not under the bishop's authority in Worms in 1226 is lamented. The Franciscans, Dominicans, Augustinians and Brothers of the Sack are all mentioned.
- A note on the Sixth Crusade. The author laments that the crusade would have been even more successful had the pope not launched a war against the Emperor Frederick II.
- A very negative account of the inquisition of Conrad of Marburg, Conrad Dorso and John the One-Eyed in 1231–1233.
- An entry on the arrival of the Mongols on the border of Germany in 1241.
- The longest part of the work, accounting for four fifths of it, is an account of the struggles for control of the city and its territory between the local bishops, the local lords, the citizenry, the cathedral chapter and the archbishopric of Mainz. The local Jews also play a role in this section.
- A notice on the abundance of wine in 1297 and a song woven into a tapestry in Worms Cathedral.

== Bibliography ==
- Bachrach, David S., ed. (2014). The Histories of a Medieval German City, Worms c. 1000–c. 1300: Translation and Commentary. Ashgate.
- Boos, Heinrich (1893). Monumenta Wormatiensia: Annalen und Chroniken. Weidmann.
- Büttner, Jan Ulrich (2016). "Chronicon Wormatiense". In G. Dunphy; C. Bratu (eds.). Encyclopedia of the Medieval Chronicle. Brill Online. doi:10.1163/2213-2139_emc_SIM_000654.
- Loud, G. A. (2016). "The Papal 'Crusade' against Frederick II in 1228–1230". In M. Balard (ed.). The Papacy and the Crusades. Routledge. pp. 91–103.
- Whalen, Brett Edward (2019). The Two Powers: The Papacy, the Empire, and the Struggle for Sovereignty in the Thirteenth Century. University of Pennsylvania Press.
