= Conrad Dorso and John the One-Eyed =

Historical figure

Conrad Dorso (or Conrad Tors) was a lay Dominican who, with his associate, the secular priest John the One-Eyed, assisted the Papal Inquisition in Germany from 1231 until they were murdered in 1233.

The Gesta Treverorum implies that Conrad and John may have been former heretics. John had only one eye and one hand. He claimed a special power to recognize heretics with his eye. In June 1227, Pope Gregory IX ordered the heresy investigator Conrad of Marburg to cooperate with Conrad and John. According to the Chronicon Wormatiense, Conrad and John arrived in the Upper Rhineland and Worms in 1231. The anonymous chronicler describes their method of inquisition:

These two first began ... among the poor, saying that they could recognize heretics. And they began to burn them as certain of them confessed that they were guilty and did not wish to abandon their sects. When the people saw that they were burning people of this type, they continually supported and aided Conrad and John ... When these two men saw that the people supported them in this manner, they kept on going further and seized whomever they wished in whatever city or village they wanted. They did not offer any evidence other than saying to the judges: "these are heretics, we wash our hands of them." It was therefore left for the judges to burn these people. But they did not keep to either the letter or the spirit of sacred scripture. The whole of the clergy everywhere was very upset about this. But because the common rabble everywhere clung to these unjust judges, their will prevailed everywhere. They condemned many people who in the hour of death called upon Lord Jesus Christ with all of their hearts, and implored the aid of the holy mother of God and of all the saints even while they were in the blazing fire. Hear how horrible this was!

The Chronicon claims that they received support from King Henry (VII) of Germany after telling him that "if we burn many rich people, you will have their goods." They are portrayed as only losing the support of the king and the nobility after turning their sights on some noblemen. To their opponents, they are said to have responded, "We would burn 100 innocents if there were just one guilty man among them." Such methods had no basis in canon law. In October 1231, Pope Gregory increased Conrad of Marburg's authority over his former colleagues, Conrad and John. Conrad of Marburg took on the authority to both investigate and judge cases of heresy, making him by some measure the first true inquisitor.

In 1233, the Conrads and John accused Henry III, Count of Sayn, who appealed to Archbishop Siegfried III of Mainz. He was acquitted at a synod in Mainz on 25 July 1233. On 30 July, Conrad of Marburg was assassinated. According to the Annales Erphordenses, Conrad Dorso brought the news to Gregory IX in Rome. Although Gregory had been preparing to condemn Conrad of Marburg's procedures as "invalid", he changed his mind after learning of the murder.

Conrad Dorso and John did not cease their activities after the murder of the inquisitor, although it was not long before they were both murdered as well. Dorso went to Strasbourg, where he accused Junker Heinz von Müllenheim. Heinz stabbed him to death in Strasbourg. John was lynched (hanged) at Friedberg. According to the Chronicon, "thus with the help of God, Germany was freed from this enormous and unheard-of judgment."

== Bibliography ==
- Bachrach, David S., ed. (2014). The Histories of a Medieval German City, Worms c. 1000–c. 1300: Translation and Commentary. Ashgate.
- Maier, Christoph T. (1994). Preaching the Crusades: Mendicant Friars and the Cross in the Thirteenth Century. Cambridge University Press.
- Moore, Robert I. (2012). The War on Heresy: Faith and Power in Medieval Europe. Belknap Press.
- Peters, Edward (1978). The Magician, the Witch, and the Law. University of Pennsylvania Press.
- Sullivan, Karen (2011). The Inner Lives of Medieval Inquisitors. University of Chicago Press.
