= English tribunal =

In England King Henry II established separate secular courts during the 1160s.

While the ecclesiastical courts of England, like those on the continent, adopted the inquisitional system, the secular common law courts continued to operate under the adversarial system. The adversarial principle that a person could not be tried until formally accused continued to apply for most criminal cases.

In 1215 this principle became enshrined as article 38 of Magna Carta:

"No bailiff for the future shall, upon his own unsupported complaint, put anyone to his law, without credible witnesses brought for this purposes."
