= Inquisitorial system =

Type of legal system

An inquisitorial system is a legal system in which the court, or a part of the court, is actively involved in investigating the facts of the case. This is distinct from an adversarial system, in which the role of the court is primarily that of an impartial referee between the plaintiff or prosecution and the defense.

Inquisitorial systems are used primarily in countries with civil legal systems, such as France and Italy, or legal systems based on Islamic law like Saudi Arabia, rather than in common law systems. It is the prevalent legal system in Continental Europe, Latin America, African countries not formerly under British rule, East Asia (except Hong Kong), Indochina, Thailand, and Indonesia. Most countries with an inquisitorial system also have some form of civil code as their main source of law. Countries using common law, including the United States, may use an inquisitorial system for summary hearings in the case of misdemeanors or infractions, such as minor traffic violations.

The distinction between an adversarial and inquisitorial system is theoretically unrelated to the distinction between a civil legal and common-law system. Some legal scholars consider inquisitorial misleading, and prefer the word nonadversarial. The function is often vested in the office of the public procurator, as in China, Japan, and Germany.

== Overview ==
In an inquisitorial system, the trial judges (usually plural in serious criminal cases) act as inquisitors who actively participate in the fact-finding process by questioning defense lawyers, prosecutors, and witnesses. They may also order specific pieces of evidence to be examined if they find the presentations by the defense or prosecution inadequate. Prior to the case getting to trial, magistrate judges (juges d'instruction in France) participate in the investigation of a case, often assessing material by police and consulting with the prosecutor.

The inquisitorial system applies to questions of criminal procedure at trial, not substantive law, that is, it determines how criminal inquiries and trials are conducted, not the kind of crimes for which one can be prosecuted or the sentences that they carry. It is most readily used in some civil legal systems; however, some jurists do not recognize this dichotomy, and see procedure and substantive legal relationships as being interconnected and part of a theory of justice as applied differently in various legal cultures.

In an adversarial system, judges focus on the issues of law and procedure and act as a referee in the contest between the defense and the prosecution. Juries decide matters of fact, and sometimes matters of the law. Neither judge nor jury can initiate an inquiry, and judges rarely ask witnesses questions directly during trial. In some United States jurisdictions, it is common practice for jurors to submit questions to the court that they believe were not resolved in direct or cross-examination. After testimony and other evidence are presented and summarized in arguments, the jury will declare a verdict (literally true statement) and in some jurisdictions the reasoning behind the verdict; however, discussions among jurors cannot be made public except in extraordinary circumstances.

Appeals on the basis of factual issues, such as sufficiency of the sum total of evidence that was properly admitted, are subject to a standard of review that is in most jurisdictions deferential to the judgment of the fact-finder at trial, be that a judge or a jury. The failure of a prosecutor to disclose evidence to the defense, for example, or a violation of the defendant's constitutional rights (legal representation, right to remain silent, an open and public trial) can trigger a dismissal or re-trial. In some adversarial jurisdictions (e.g., the United States, and England and Wales), a prosecutor cannot appeal a "not guilty" verdict (absent corruption or gross malfeasance by the court).

In adversarial systems, the defendant may plead "guilty" or "no contest," in exchange for reduced sentences, a practice known as plea bargaining, or a plea deal, which is an extremely common practice in the United States. In theory, the defendant must allocute or "voice" his or her crimes in open court, and the judge must believe the defendant is telling the truth about his or her guilt. In an inquisitorial system, a confession of guilt would not be regarded as ground for a guilty verdict. The prosecutor is required to provide evidence supporting a guilty verdict. But this requirement is not unique to inquisitorial systems, as many or most adversarial systems impose a similar requirement under the name corpus delicti.

== History ==
Until the development of the Catholic Medieval Inquisition in the 12th century, the legal systems used in medieval Europe generally relied on the adversarial system to determine whether someone should be tried and whether a person was guilty or innocent. Under this system, unless people were caught in the act of committing crimes, they could not be tried until they had been formally accused by their victim, the voluntary accusations of a sufficient number of witnesses, or by an inquest (an early form of grand jury) convened specifically for that purpose. A weakness of this system was that, because it relied on the voluntary accusations of witnesses, and because the penalties for making a false accusation were severe, victims and would-be witnesses could be hesitant to make accusations to the court, for fear of implicating themselves. Because of the difficulties in deciding cases, procedures such as trial by ordeal or combat were accepted.

Beginning in 1198, Pope Innocent III issued a series of decretals that reformed the ecclesiastical court system. Under the new processus per inquisitionem (inquisitional procedure), an ecclesiastical magistrate no longer required a formal accusation to summon and try a defendant. Instead, an ecclesiastical court could summon and interrogate witnesses of its own initiative. If the (possibly secret) testimony of those witnesses accused a person of a crime, that person could be summoned and tried. In 1215, the Fourth Council of the Lateran affirmed the use of the inquisitional system. The council forbade clergy from conducting trials by ordeal or combat. As a result, in parts of continental Europe, the ecclesiastical courts operating under the inquisitional procedure became the dominant method by which disputes were adjudicated. In France, the parlements — lay courts — also employed inquisitorial proceedings.

In England, King Henry II had established separate secular courts during the 1160s. While the ecclesiastical courts of England, like those on the continent, adopted the inquisitional system, the secular common law courts continued to operate under the adversarial system. The adversarial principle that a person could not be tried until formally accused continued to apply for most criminal cases. In 1215 this principle became enshrined as article 38 of the Magna Carta: "No bailiff for the future shall, upon his own unsupported complaint, put anyone to his law, without credible witnesses brought for this purposes."

The first territory to wholly adopt the inquisitional system was the Holy Roman Empire. The new German legal process was introduced as part of the Wormser Reformation of 1498 and then the Constitutio Criminalis Bambergensis of 1507. The adoption of the Constitutio Criminalis Carolina (peinliche Gerichtsordnung of Charles V) in 1532 made inquisitional procedures empirical law. It was not until Napoleon introduced the Code of criminal procedure of 1808 on 16 November 1808, that the classical procedures of inquisition were ended in all German territories.

In the development of modern legal institutions that took place in the 19th century, for the most part jurisdictions codified their private law and criminal law, and reviewed and codified the rules of civil procedure as well. It was through this development that the role of an inquisitorial system became enshrined in most European civilian legal systems. However, there exist significant differences of operating methods and procedures between 18th-century ancien régime courts and 19th-century courts. In particular, limits on the powers of investigators were typically added, as well as increased rights of the defense.

It is too much of a generalization to say that the civil law is purely inquisitorial and the common law adversarial. The ancient Roman custom of arbitration has now been adapted in many common-law jurisdictions to a more inquisitorial form. In some mixed civil law systems, such as those in Scotland, Quebec, and Louisiana, while the substantive law is civil in nature and evolution, the procedural codes that have developed over the last few hundred years are based upon the English adversarial system.

== Modern usage ==
=== France ===
The main feature of the inquisitorial system in criminal justice in France, and other countries functioning along the same lines, is the function of the examining or investigating judge (juge d'instruction), also called a magistrate judge. The examining judge conducts investigations into serious crimes or complex inquiries. As a member of the judiciary, they are independent and outside the province of the executive branch, and therefore separate from the Office of Public Prosecutions, which is supervised by the Minister of Justice. Despite high media attention and frequent portrayals in TV series, examining judges are active in a small minority of cases. In 2005, there were 1.1 million criminal rulings in France, while only 33,000 new cases were investigated by judges. The vast majority of cases are therefore investigated directly by law enforcement agencies (police, gendarmerie, etc.) under the supervision of the Office of Public Prosecutions (procureurs).

Examining judges are used for serious crimes, e.g., murder and rape, and for crimes involving complexity, such as embezzlement, misuse of public funds, and corruption. The case may be brought before the examining judge either by the public prosecutor (procureur) or, more rarely, by the victim (who may compel an instruction even if the public prosecutor rules the charges to be insufficient). The judge questions witnesses, interrogates suspects, and orders searches for other investigations. Their role is not to prosecute the accused, but to gather facts, and as such their duty is to look for any and all evidence, whether incriminating or exculpatory (à charge et à décharge). Both the prosecution and the defense may request the judge to act, and may appeal the judge's decisions before an appellate court. The scope of the inquiry is limited by the mandate given by the prosecutor's office: the examining judge cannot open a criminal investigation sua sponte.

In the past, the examining judge could order committal of the accused, this power being subject to appeal. However, this is no longer authorized, and other judges have to approve a committal order. If the examining judge decides there is a valid case against a suspect, the accused is sent for adversarial trial by jury. The examining judge does not sit on the trial court which tries the case and is prohibited from sitting for future cases involving the same defendant. The case is tried before the court in a manner similar to that of adversarial courts: the prosecution (and on occasion a plaintiff) seeks the conviction of accused criminals, the defense attempts to rebut the prosecution claims, and the judge and jury draw their conclusions from the evidence presented at trial.

As a result of judicial investigation and defendants being able to have judicial proceedings dismissed on procedural grounds during the examining phase, cases where the evidence is weak tend not to reach the trial stage. Conversely, the guilty plea and plea bargaining were until recently unknown to French law. They are accepted only for crimes for which the prosecution seeks a sentence not exceeding one year imprisonment. Therefore, most cases go to trial, including cases where the prosecution is almost sure to gain a conviction. In countries such as the United States, the latter cases would be settled by plea bargain.

== Other types ==
=== Administrative justice ===
In administrative courts, such as the Conseil d'État, litigation proceedings are markedly more inquisitorial. Most of the procedure is conducted in writing; the plaintiff writes to the court, which requests explanations from the administration or public service concerned; when answered, the court may then request further detail from the plaintiff, etc. When the case is sufficiently complete, the lawsuit opens in court; however, the parties are not required to attend the court hearing. This method reflects the fact that administrative lawsuits are for the most part about matters of formal procedure and technicalities.

=== Inquisitorial tribunals within the United States ===
Certain administrative proceedings within some common-law jurisdictions in the United States may be similar to their civil law counterparts but are conducted on a more inquisitorial model. For instance tribunals dealing with minor traffic violations at the New York City Traffic Violations Bureau are held before an adjudicator, who also functions as a prosecutor. They question witnesses before rendering judgements and setting fines. These types of tribunals or boards function as an expedited form of justice, in which the state agents conduct an initial investigation and the adjudicator's job is to confirm these preliminary findings through a simplified form of procedure that grants some basic amount of due process or fundamental justice. The accused party has an opportunity to place his or her objections on the record.

== See also ==
- Adversarial system
- Judicial interpretation

== Bibliography ==
- (in Italian) Antonia Fiori, "Quasi denunciante fama : note sull’introduzione del processo tra rito accusatorio e inquisitorio", in Der Einfluss der Kanonistik auf die europäische Rechtskultur, 3. Strafrecht und Strafprozeß, éd. O. Condorelli, Fr. Roumy, M. Schmoeckel, Cologne, Weimar, Vienne, 2012, p. 351-367, online.
- Richard M. Fraher, « IV Lateran's Revolution in Criminal Procédure : the Birth of inquisitio, the End of Ordeals and Innocent III's Vision of Ecclesiastical Politics », dans Studia in honorem eminentissimi cardinalis Alphonsi M. Stickler, éd. Rosalius Josephus Castillo Lara, Rome, Librairie Ateneo Salesiano (Pontificia studiorum universitas salesiana, Facilitas juris canonici, Studia et textus historie juris canonici, 7), 1992, p. 97-111.
- (in German) Lotte Kéry, « Inquisitio-denunciatio-exceptio : Möglichkeiten der Verfahrenseinleitung im Dekretalenrecht », Zeitschrift der Savigny-Stiftung für Rechtsgeschichte, Kanonistische Abteilung, 87, 2001, p. 226-268.
- Julien Théry, "Fama : Public Opinion as a Legal Category. Inquisitorial Procedure and the Medieval Revolution in Government (12th-14th centuries)", in Micrologus, 32 (« 'Dicitur'. Hearsay in Science, Memory and Poetry »), 2024, p. 153-193, online.
- Julien Théry-Astruc, "Judicial Inquiry as an Instrument of Centralized Government : The Papacy’s Criminal Proceedings against Prelates in the Age of Theocracy (mid-12th to mid-14th century)", in "Proceedings of the 14th International Congress of Medieval Canon Law", Città del Vaticano, 2016, p. 875-889, online.
- (in German) Winfried Trusen, « Der Inquisitionsprozess : seine historischen Grundlagen und frühen Formen », Zeitschrift der Savigny-Stiftung für Rechtsgeschichte, Kanonistische Abteilung, 74, 1988, p. 171-215.
