= Henry III of Sayn =

German aristocrat

Henry III "the Great" (? – 1246) was the count of Sayn (1202–1246), a county located near the Sieg River in northern Rhineland-Palatinate, Germany. Henry III shared the first year of his reign with his uncle, count Henry II, as he and his father Eberhard II had co-ruled the county. Gottfried II (Count of Sponheim) had been a regent from 1181 and continued until his death in 1220. John, count of Sponheim-Starkenburg, was regent from 1226 until Henry's death in 1246.

In 1233, Conrad of Marburg, Conrad Dorso and John the One-Eyed accused Henry of indulging in satanic orgies. Henry pleaded his case successfully to an assembly of bishops in Mainz and was acquitted. Conrad, however, refused to accept the verdict, but eventually left Mainz. While passing near Marburg, Conrad was ambushed and killed by a group of knights. It is unknown whether they were in the service of Henry.

Henry died in 1246. His county was inherited by his brother-in-law, count Eberhard III of Sponheim-Eberstein.
