= Pope Gregory IX and Judaism =

The relations between Gregory IX and Judaism were comparatively good for a medieval pope, since Gregory acted as a political protector to persecuted Jewish communities. However, he also enacted canonical laws that were later criticized for having maintained the Jews' separate status in medieval society.

== 1233 mandate ==
- 6 April 1233 "Mandate, if facts are established, to the archbishops and bishops of France to induce the Christians in their dioceses to stop persecuting the Jews, who had complained to the pope that they were being maltreated and tortured by certain lords, imprisoned and left to die. The Jews are willing to forsake usury. They are to be set free and are not to be injured in person or in property."

== 1234 decretals ==
In the 1234 Decretals, he invested the doctrine of perpetua servitus iudaeorum – perpetual servitude of the Jews – with the force of canonical law. According to this, Jews would have to remain in a condition of political servitude and abject humiliation until Judgment Day. The doctrine then found its way into the doctrine of servitus camerae imperialis, or servitude immediately subject to the Emperor's authority, promulgated by Frederick II.

The second-class status of Jews thereby established would last until well into the 19th century.

== 1235 protection ==
- 3 May 1235 "Protection provided to Jews by standard formula of Sicut Judeis."

== 1236 charges, mandate and request ==
- 17 August 1236 "List of charges against Emperor Frederick II includes the "matter of the Jewish communities of which certain churches were deprived."
- 5 September 1236 "Mandate to Gerald de Malemort, archbishop of Bordeaux, Peter, bishop of Saintes, John Builloti, bishop of Angoulême, John de Melun, bishop of Poitiers, Hugo, bishop of Sees, William de Saint-Mere-Eglise, bishop of Avranches, Peter de Colmieu, bishop-elect of Rouen, Juhellus de Mathefelon, archbishop of Tours, Geoffroy de Loudon, bishop of Le Mans, William de Beaumont, bishop of Angers, Alan, bishop of Rennes, Robertus, bishop of Nantes, Ramilf, bishop of Quimper, and Philip Berruyer, archbishop-elect of Bourges to force the crusaders of their dioceses who had killed and robbed Jews to provide proper satisfaction for the crimes perpetrated against the Jews and for the property stolen from them. They had complained to the Pope."
- 5 September 1236 "Request to Louis IX, king of France, to punish the crusaders, murderers and despoilers of the Jews, and to compel them to make restitution." [Source for all quotes on this pope: (The Apostolic See and the Jews, Documents: 492-1404; Simonsohn, Shlomo, p. 143,154,162,163,165)]
