= Vox in Rama =

1233 papal decretal

Vox in Rama ("voice in Ramah") is a decretal sent by Pope Gregory IX in June 1233 condemning the heresy of Luciferianism said to be rife in Germany, and authorizing the preaching of a crusade against it. Copies of the letter were sent to Emperor Frederick II, King Henry (VII) of Germany, Archbishop Siegfried III of Mainz, his suffragans, Bishop Conrad II of Hildesheim and the preacher Konrad von Marburg. The copies are dated to 11, 13 and 14 June.

Vox in Rama was one of a series of calls Gregory IX issued for crusades against heretics. Lucis eterne (29 October 1232) called for a crusade against the Stedinger. O altitudo divitiarum (10 June 1233) had the same object as Vox in Rama, but was sent to Konrad von Marburg alone. Miserias et erumpnas (13 February 1234) authorised the Bosnian Crusade.

== Background ==
In 1233 Gregory IX established the Papal Inquisition to regularize the persecution of heresy. The Papal Inquisition was intended to bring order to what had become the haphazard episcopal inquisitions, originally established by Lucius III in 1184. Gregory's aim was to bring order and legality to the process of dealing with heresy, since there had been tendencies by mobs of townspeople to burn alleged heretics without much of a trial. In 1231 Pope Gregory IX appointed a number of Papal Inquisitors (Inquisitores haereticae pravitatis), mostly Dominicans and Franciscans, for the various regions of France, Italy and parts of Germany. The aim was to introduce due process and objective investigation into the beliefs of those accused to the often erratic and unjust persecution of heresy on the part of local ecclesiastical and secular jurisdictions.

The 13th century was a time of great superstition and saw the start of the "demonisation of heretics" by the Church, attributing their lack of belief in the Catholic faith to the devil. Barber claims that it was during this time that there was a great zeal for the sending out of inquisitors by the pope and local bishops with the aim of seeking out potential heretics. In 1233, Konrad von Marburg began an inquisition in Mainz at the behest of either the Pope or the archbishop.

Allegedly through torture and terror, Konrad reported he had uncovered a satanic cult which worshiped devils in the forms of a demonic man and of a diabolical black cat. The inquisition of Konrad was controversial: shortly after Konrad arrived in Mainz, a papal official called Bernard wrote to Gregory stating that Konrad had been forcing innocent people to confess by threatening them with burning at the stake if they refused to do so. Shortly thereafter, Konrad was assassinated, possibly by the servants of Henry II, Count of Sayn, whom Konrad had accused of fostering heresy.

The issue of the admonition Vox in Rama was a response to Konrad's allegations, urging Siegfried III and King Henry, representing the ecclesiastical and temporal authorities respectively, to seek out and destroy the heretics.

== Contents ==
The decretal describes in detail the initiation rites of the sect, claiming that the potential initiate is first approached by a mysterious toad as large as a dog. Shortly afterwards an emaciated pale man would appear, whom the initiate would kiss and thereby forget all memory of the Catholic faith. Members of the sect would then meet for a meal. When the meal had ended, the sect would arise and a statue of a black cat would come to life, walking backwards with its tail erect. First the new initiate and then the master of the sect would kiss the cat on the buttocks.

After the ritual was completed, the decretal claims that the candles in the room would be extinguished and the sect would engage in wild orgies which were sometimes homosexual in nature. Once the candles are re-lit, a man from a dark corner of the room “comes forth from the loins upward, shining like the sun. His lower part is shaggy like a cat.” After a brief litany-like dialogue between the cat and the cult members, the meeting ends.

Gregory also claims that the sect committed various crimes against the Eucharist:

They even receive the body of the Lord every year at Easter from the hand of the priest and, carrying it in their mouths home, they throw it into the latrine in contempt of the Saviour.

In conclusion, Gregory condemns the practice and calls upon the religious and secular authorities in the diocese to take action against the cult's participants.

The initial text line Vox in Rama (“voice in Ramah”) is taken from a Bible passage found in (Jeremiah 31:15) “Thus saith the LORD; A voice was heard in Ramah, lamentation, and bitter weeping; Rahel weeping for her children refused to be comforted for her children, because they were not.” and is cited in Matthew 2:18 as a prophetic lament for the massacre of the infants of Bethlehem by King Herod.

== Allegations of cat-killing ==
In his 1999 book Classical Cats: The Rise and Fall of the Sacred Cat, historian Donald Engels claims that Vox in Rama proclaimed all cats to be symbols of the Devil and exhorted Catholic clergy and laity alike to kill cats whenever possible. He alleges that a "crusade of extermination against the hapless cat" was waged throughout the 13th and 14th centuries, where all the cats in towns and cities were rounded up and burnt alive. Engels further asserted that the subsequent "systematic extermination of cats from the cities and towns of western Europe" caused a great growth in the black rat population, which in turn allowed for greater proliferation of plague and worsened the severity of the Black Death. Engels also claims that Vox in Rama was responsible for creating the association between black cats and witchcraft in European folklore.

However, the text of Vox in Rama does not claim that all cats are Satanic or contain any orders to kill cats. There is also no documentary or archaeological evidence to support the Church's condemnation of cats or widespread cat-killing in the time and manner that Engels describes. An analysis of 13th-century cat bones recovered in Cambridge reveals that all the cats examined were butchered for meat and pelts, not burnt alive. Contemporary Catholic religious instructions, such as the Ancrene Wisse, permitted consecrated women and anchorites to own pet cats. The only context in which city officials ordered the mass killing of cats was in the context of killing stray animals suspected of carrying plague, and there are no known examples from before the 15th century. Regarding the claim that more cats predating on plague-carrying rats would have mitigated its spread, cats are highly susceptible to contracting Yersinia pestis and risk becoming vectors of plague themselves if they eat infected rodents.

== Text ==
- Carl Rodenberg, Epistolae saeculi XIII e regestis pontificum Romanorum selectae, MGH, Berlin, Weidmann, 1883, p. 432.
- APOSCRIPTA Database - Lettres des papes, n. 3644, online.

== Sources ==
- Malcolm Lambert, The Cathars, Wiley-Blackwell, 1998.
- Robert I. Moore, The War on Heresy. Faith and Power in Medieval Europe, London, Profile Books, 2012, p. 275-278.
