= History of the principle of inquisition in German criminal law =

The principle of inquisition is a form of criminal proceeding developed in Italy, which is labeled by the axiom of the ex officio inquiry of a criminal issue. There is no obligation of the inquiry and the final decision to be executed by the same institution.

== History ==
The procedure of inquisition was already known in Roman law. In the time of the ancient Roman kings inquisition was the standard method of criminal inquiry. There were no rules. The disposal of the magistrate, who acted on pure denunciation, was the criteria which guided the proceedings. Because of these problems, the principle of inquisition was replaced by a principle of contradiction.

Pope Innocent III (1161–1216) reintroduced the procedure of inquisition for canon law, where it became a well-feared instrument against heretics. The concept of inquisition was not limited to canon law. In Italy the use of the inquisition was transferred to secular criminal law.

The first adaption within the territory of the Holy Roman Empire of the German Nation were the Wormser Reformation of 1498 and the Constitutio Criminalis Bambergensis of 1507. The adoption of the Constitutio Criminalis Carolina ("peinliche Gerichtsordnung" of Charles V) in 1532 makes the procedure of inquisition empirical law. It was the passage of the French Code of criminal procedure of 1808 (code d'instruction criminelle), by Emperor Napoleon of France on November 16, 1808 and the adoption of its principles in German territories that terminated the classical procedure of inquisition in Germany.

== Practical translation to the criminal law of the Holy Roman Empire ==
Completely new to the criminal procedures of the Middle Ages was the attempt to base the decision of the opening and the sentence on facts, inquired by the court.

The law of the Germans only allowed the beginning of a lawsuit on the accusations of the victim. The offender was limited to the positioning of the charge. The only hearing of evidence was the confirmation of the good reputation of the defendant by oath. Notable members of the community, so called helpers by oath (Eidhelfer) described only the reputation of the defendant, not the facts or the circumstances of the crime. There was no witness to the crime involved. In case of good reputation, the charge failed. Only in the case of bad reputation or of confession was a conviction possible. That is the reason why the typical legal conflict of the early Middle Ages was solved by regulated force of arms, which public peace and peace of God alone limited, while legal proceedings were almost an exception. The institution of inquisition was an enormous legal improvement, because it included the proof relating to the facts of the crime to the inquiry. The reputation of the defendant no longer was the main topic of the proceedings. It was replaced by an inquiry, made on real facts.

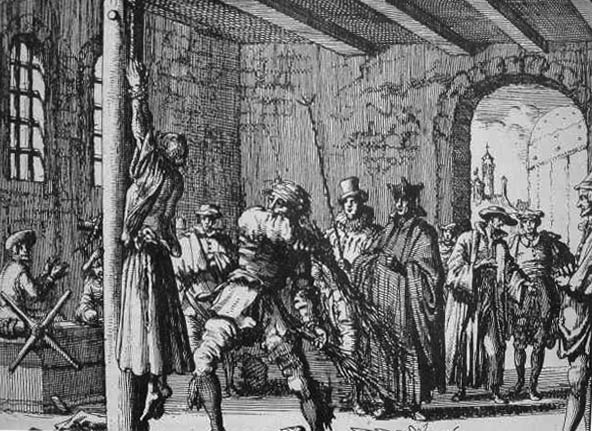
The teacher Ursula painfully tortured, whipped, beaten, and finally burned in Maastricht, AD 1570 engraved by Jan Luyken 1685

The implementation of the facts practically meant an enormous restriction of the rights of a defendant with good reputation, who now faced a real risk of condemnation. There was a certain discomfort with this risk. Therefore there was still the need for a confession in addition to the results of the inquiry. This confession was to be gained by torture. An innocent was deemed able to withstand the torture with the help of God, and thus would not falsely confess. Contemporaries understand the problem of torture not to be this last proof of findings, long proved by finished inquiries, but an easy way to substitute those inquiries. The criminal law of the Duchy of Lorraine limited the use of torture with the need of approval by the procurateur general, an administrator situated at the ducal court in Nancy. The local court had to ask for the use of torture by presenting the results of its inquiries.

== Problems of the inquisition ==
The greatest problems of the medieval proceeding of inquiry were to be found outside of the principle itself.

- The proceedings occurred in secrecy. The maxim of publicity, that is standard today, did not exist. A proceeding without public control always included the risk of a judge who was not able or willing (because of the influence of others, especially his lord) to give a proper judgment.
- Torture gave proof to everything. A proceeding that is based on any form of torture will never give results that can be trusted. Torture is only an instrument of manipulation.
- There was the danger of denunciation. The Constitutio Carolina did not plan for denunciation. The legal option of a citizen to open legal proceedings was through an accusation. This accuser had to answer for the truth of their accusations. In the case of innocence of the defendant the accuser would be punished. The other way to begin the proceedings was by the personal knowledge of the authorities. This degenerated into a system of denunciation. In some regions during witch trials a box of denunciation (a box hanging or standing at a public place), was used to enable everyone to make anonymous accusations by inserting a piece of paper without revealing their names, and thus assuming no risk.
- The only demerit of the principle of inquisition itself was the lack of neutrality of the judge. He had to decide on the results of an inquiry which only he himself had made. Why should he dispute his own work? This problem can be solved with publicity and the possibility of appeal.

== The principle of inquiry in modern proceedings ==
The principle of inquisition is still in use in modern criminal law in Germany, though to a restricted extent. The legal basis is § 244 II Strafprozessordnung (German code of criminal procedure) that orders the court to examine ex officio every fact and proof that could be relevant to a judgment. Most of these facts or proofs are inserted by the prosecution or the defence, but the court has the right to present evidence on its own. The court is even enabled to judge, according to the result of the proceedings, the violation of laws the prosecution did not mention and to sentence differently from the proposals of the parties (an offense of involuntary manslaughter could be raised into a charge and sentence of premeditated murder, for example). If the proceedings show the violation of other laws by the same act, the court is able to pass sentence on these as well.

== See also ==
- Inquisition

== Literature ==
- Heinz LIEBERICH, Deutsche Rechtsgeschichte, 1992
- Eberhard SCHMIDT, Einführung in die Geschichte der deutschen Strafrechtspflege, 1965
- Hermann CONRAD, Deutsche Rechtsgeschichte, Band 1 Frühzeit und Mittelalter, 1954
- August SCHOETENSACK, Der Strafprozeß der Carolina, 1904,
