= Pope Gregory IX =

Head of the Catholic Church from 1227 to 1241

- Bishop of Rome
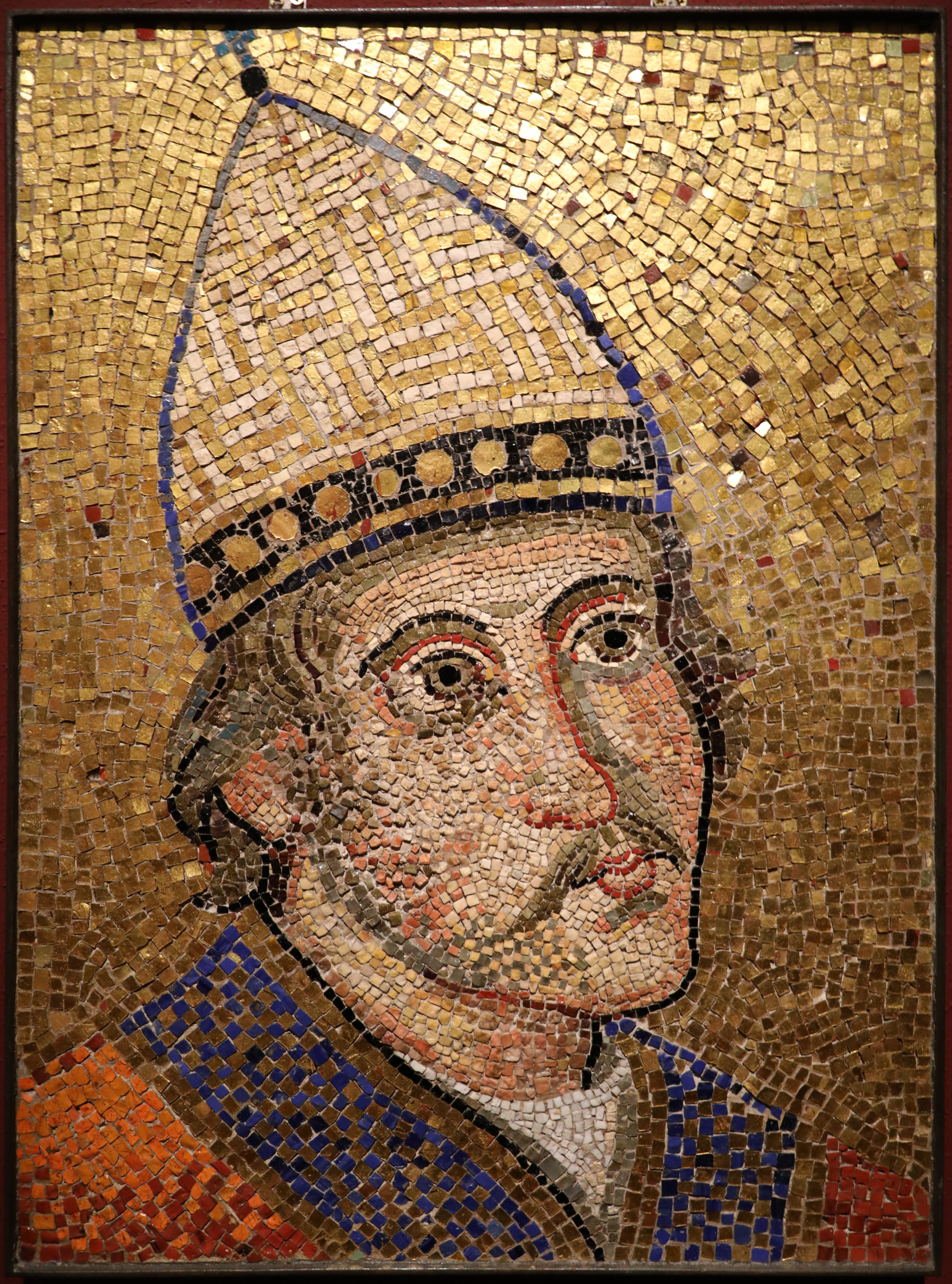
- Mosaic of Gregory IX, c. 1225-50
- Church: Catholic Church
- Papacy began: 19 March 1227
- Papacy ended: 22 August 1241
- Predecessor: Honorius III
- Successor: Celestine IV
- Previous posts: Cardinal-Deacon of Sant'Eustachio (1198–1206); Cardinal-Bishop of Ostia e Velletri (1206–1227); Dean of the College of Cardinals (1206-1227)

Orders
- Consecration: c. 1206
- Created cardinal: December 1198 by Innocent III

Personal details
- Born: Ugolino dei Conti; 1145 Anagni, Papal States
- Died: 22 August 1241 (aged 95–96) Rome, Papal States
- Coat of arms: Gregory IX's coat of arms

Ordination history of Pope Gregory IX
History
Cardinalate
- Elevated by: Pope Innocent III
- Date: December 1198
Episcopal succession
Bishops consecrated by Pope Gregory IX as principal consecrator
- Bishop Gregoire: 2 April 1206
- Bishop Cencio (Pope Honorius III): 24 July 1216
- Bishop Siegfried Ratisbona: ?? ???? 1227
- Mariano Filangeri: March 1227
- Silvestre Godinho: 4 August 1231
- Baudoin d'Aulne, O. Cist.: 1232
- Wilbrand de Kevenburg (Käfernburg): 25 November 1235
- Walter Cantilupe: 3 May 1237
- Guercio Tebalducci: 16 May 1237
- João Rol (Raol, Raolis): 21 December 1239

Pope Gregory IX (Latin: Gregorius IX; born Ugolino dei Conti; 1145 – 22 August 1241) was head of the Catholic Church and the ruler of the Papal States from 19 March 1227 until his death in 1241. He is known for issuing the Decretales and instituting the Papal Inquisition, in response to the failures of the episcopal inquisitions established during the time of Pope Lucius III, by means of the papal bull Ad abolendam, issued in 1184.

He worked initially as a cardinal, and after becoming the successor of Honorius III, he fully inherited the traditions of Gregory VII and of his own cousin Innocent III, and zealously continued their policy of papal supremacy.

== Early life and education ==
Ugolino (Hugh) was born in Anagni near Rome. The date of his birth varies in sources between c. 1145 and 1170. He is said to have been "in his nineties, if not nearly one hundred years old" at his death. He received his education at the Universities of Paris and Bologna.

He was created Cardinal-Deacon of the church of Sant'Eustachio by his cousin Innocent III in December 1198. In 1206, he was promoted to the rank of Cardinal Bishop of Ostia e Velletri. He became Dean of the Sacred College of Cardinals in 1218 or 1219. Upon the special request of Saint Francis, in 1220, Pope Honorius III appointed him Cardinal Protector of the order of the Franciscans.

As Cardinal Bishop of Ostia, he cultivated a wide range of acquaintances, among them the Queen of England, Isabella of Angoulême.

== Papacy ==
Gregory IX was elevated to the papacy in the papal election of 1227. He took the name "Gregory" because he formally assumed the papal office at the monastery of Saint Gregory ad Septem Solia. That same year, in one of his earliest acts as pope, he expanded the Inquisition powers already assigned to Konrad von Marburg to encompass the investigation of heresy throughout the whole of Germany.

Gregory's bull Parens scientiarum of 1231, after the University of Paris strike of 1229, resolved differences between the unruly university scholars of Paris and the local authorities. His solution was in the manner of a true follower of Innocent III: he issued what in retrospect has been viewed as the magna carta of the university, assuming direct control by extending papal patronage: his bull allowed future suspension of lectures over a flexible range of provocations, from "monstrous injury or offense" to squabbles over "the right to assess the rents of lodgings".

In October 1232, after an investigation by legates, Gregory proclaimed a crusade against the Stedinger to be preached in northern Germany. In June 1233, he granted a plenary indulgence to those who took part.

In 1233, Gregory IX established the Papal Inquisition to regularize the prosecution of heresy. According to Thomas Madden, a defender of the Inquisition, the Papal Inquisition was intended to bring order to the haphazard episcopal inquisitions which had been established by Lucius III in 1184. Gregory's aim allegedly was to bring order and legality to the process of dealing with heresy, since there had been tendencies by mobs of townspeople to burn alleged heretics without much of a trial. In 1231 Pope Gregory IX appointed a number of Papal Inquisitors (Inquisitores haereticae pravitatis), mostly Dominicans and Franciscans, for the various regions of France, Italy and parts of Germany. Contrary to popular belief, says Madden, the aim was to introduce due process and objective investigation into the beliefs of those accused to the often erratic and unjust persecution of heresy on the part of local ecclesiastical and secular jurisdictions. However, to Walter Ullmann, "there is hardly one item in the whole Inquisitorial procedure that could be squared with the demands of justice; on the contrary, every one of its items is the denial of justice or a hideous caricature of it [...] its principles are the very denial of the demands made by the most primitive concepts of natural justice [...] This kind of proceeding has no longer any semblance to a judicial trial but is rather its systematic and methodical perversion."

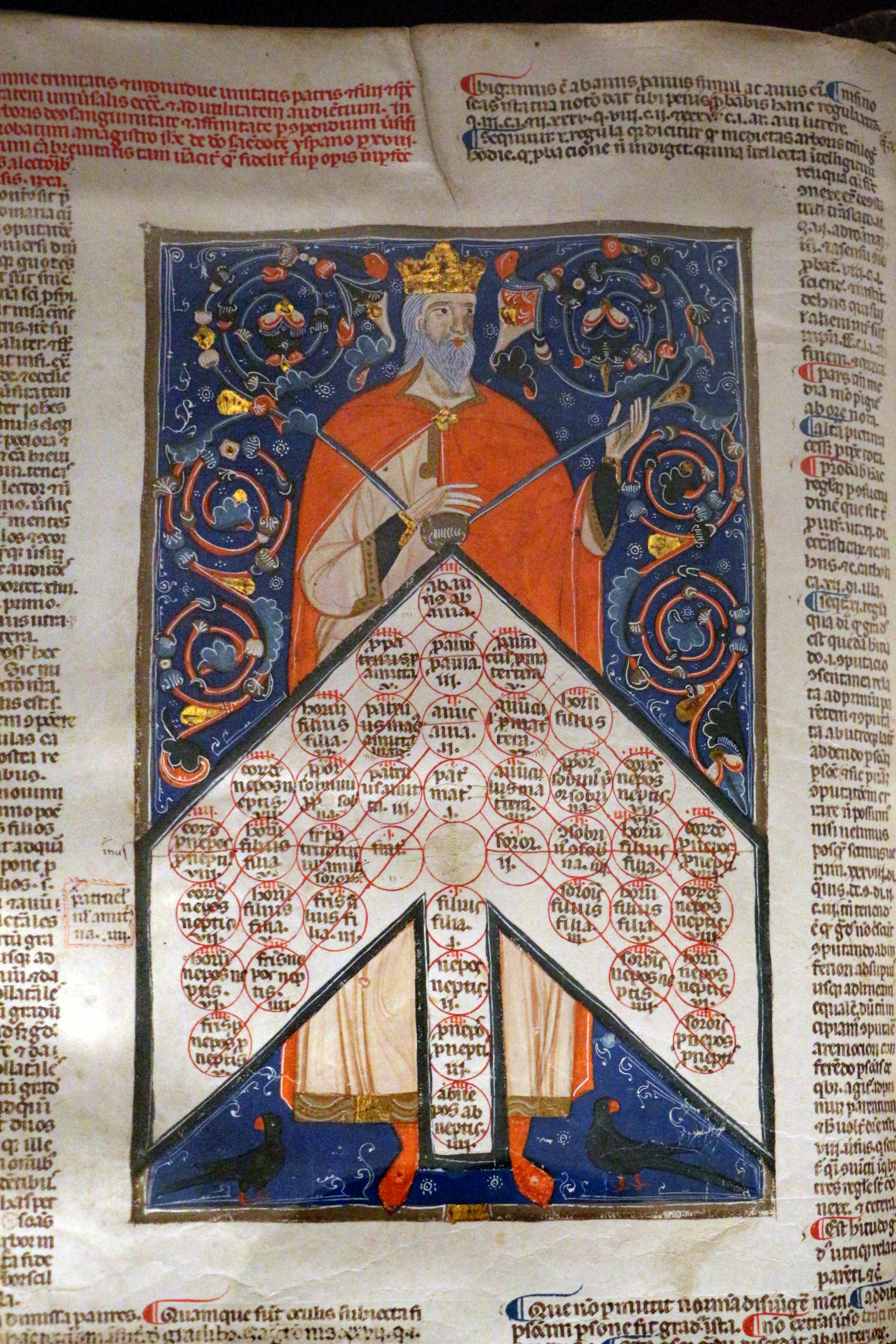
Page from a late 13 c. copy of the Decretals of Gregory IX, now in the Biblioteca Medicea Laurenziana, Florence

Gregory was a remarkably skillful and learned lawyer. He caused to be prepared Nova Compilatio decretalium, which was promulgated in numerous copies in 1234 (first printed at Mainz in 1473). This New Compilation of Decretals was the culmination of a long process of systematising the mass of pronouncements that had accumulated since the Early Middle Ages, a process that had been under way since the first half of the 12th century and had come to fruition in the Decretum, compiled and edited by the papally commissioned legist Gratian and published in 1140. The supplement completed the work, which provided the foundation for papal legal theory.

In the 1234 Decretals, he invested the doctrine of perpetua servitus iudaeorum – perpetual servitude of the Jews – with the force of canonical law. According to this, the followers of the Talmud would have to remain in a condition of political servitude until Judgment Day. The doctrine then found its way into the doctrine of servitus camerae imperialis, or servitude immediately subject to the Emperor's authority, promulgated by Frederick II. The Jews were thus suppressed from having direct influence over the political process and the life of Christian states into the 19th century and the rise of liberalism. In 1234, Gregory issued the papal bull Rachel suum videns calling for a new crusade to the Holy Land, leading to the Crusade of 1239.

In 1239, under the influence of Nicholas Donin, a Jewish convert to Christianity, Gregory ordered that all copies of the Jewish Talmud be confiscated. Following a public disputation between Christians and Jewish theologians, this culminated in a mass burning of some 12,000 handwritten Talmudic manuscripts on 12 June 1242, in Paris.

Gregory was a supporter of the mendicant orders which he saw as an excellent means for counteracting by voluntary poverty the love of luxury and splendour which was possessing many ecclesiastics. He was a friend of Saint Dominic as well as Clare of Assisi. On 17 January 1235, he approved the Order of Our Lady of Mercy for the redemption of captives. He appointed ten cardinals and canonized Saints Elisabeth of Hungary, Dominic, Anthony of Padua, and Francis of Assisi, of whom he had been a personal friend and early patron. He transformed a chapel to Our Lady in the church of Santa Maria del Popolo in Rome.

Gregory IX endorsed the Northern Crusades and attempts to bring Orthodox Russians, particularly in the Pskov Republic and the Novgorod Republic, under the Papacy's fold. In 1229, he declared that Finlandia (Finland) had passed under his protection. In 1232, Gregory IX asked the Livonian Brothers of the Sword to send troops to protect Finland, whose semi-pagan people were fighting against the Novgorod Republic in the Finnish-Novgorodian wars; however, there is no known information if any ever arrived to assist. Gregory received news in 1237 that the Tavastians rejected Christianity and he called on all Christians to join him in a crusade.

The pope struggled with a revolt in Rome in 1234.

=== Struggle with Frederick II ===
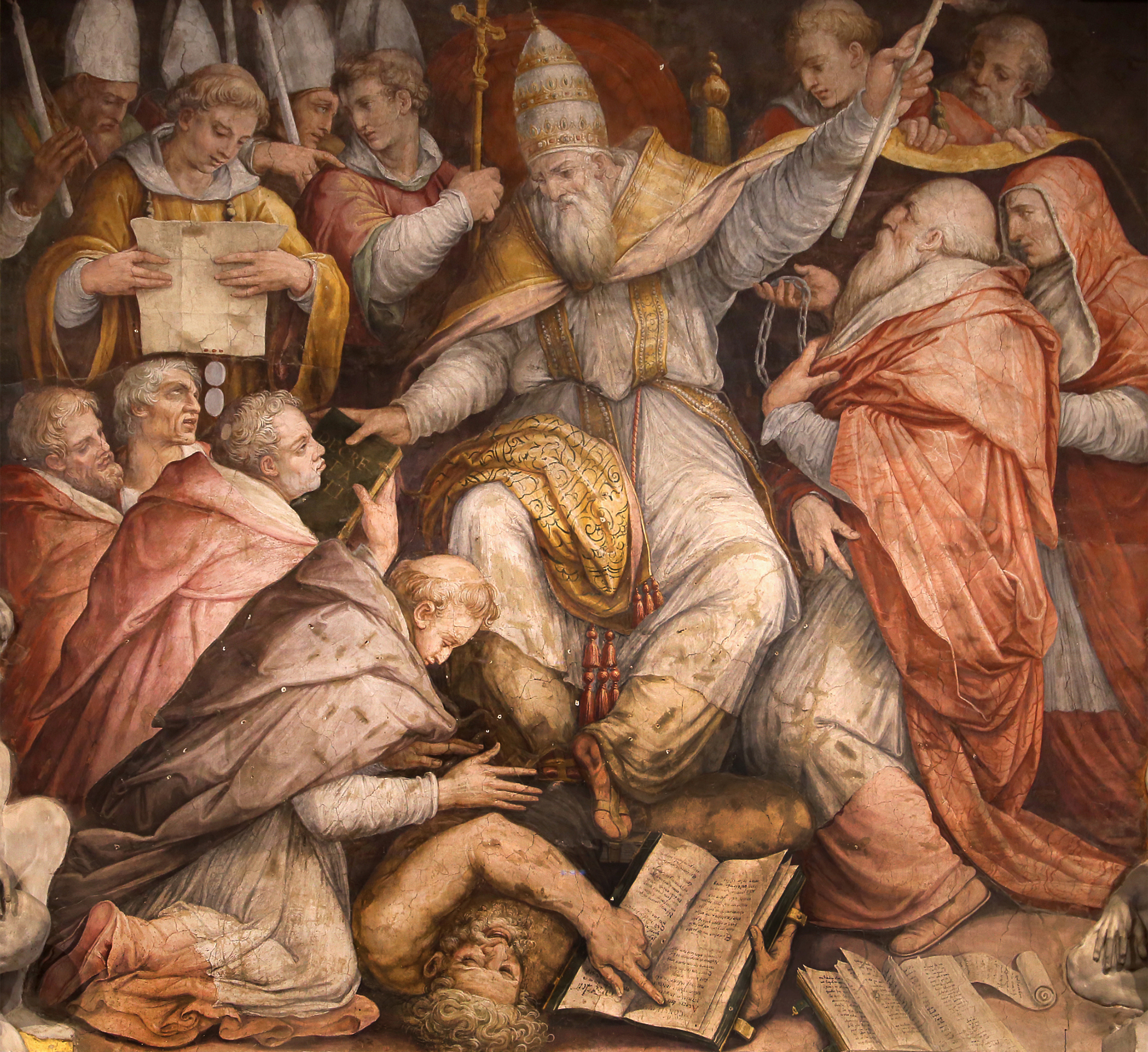
Fanciful 16th c. fresco depicting Gregory excommunicating Frederick II in the Sala Regia, by Giorgio Vasari. Since few details were provided to the artist, the excommunication scene is given generically. Frederick is shown pointing to a book with the word "Concilium" shown, possibly a reference to the general council that the emperor attempted to call to depose Gregory.

At the coronation of Frederick II in Rome, 22 November 1220, the emperor made a vow to embark for the Holy Land in August 1221. Gregory IX began his pontificate by suspending the Holy Roman Emperor Frederick II, for dilatoriness in carrying out the promised Sixth Crusade. Frederick II appealed to the sovereigns of Europe complaining of his treatment. The suspension was followed by excommunication and threats of deposition, as deeper rifts appeared. Frederick II went to the Holy Land and in fact managed to take possession of Jerusalem. Gregory IX distrusted the emperor, since Rainald, the imperial Governor of Spoleto, had invaded the Pontifical States during the emperor's absence. In June 1229, Frederick II returned from the Holy Land, routed the papal army which Gregory IX had sent to invade Sicily, and made new overtures of peace to the pope. The war of 1228–1230 is known as the War of the Keys.

Gregory IX and Frederick came to a truce, but when Frederick defeated the Lombard League in 1239, the possibility that he might dominate all of Italy, surrounding the Papal States, became a very real threat. A new outbreak of hostilities led to a fresh excommunication of the emperor in 1239 and to a prolonged war. Gregory denounced Frederick II as a heretic and summoned a council at Rome to give point to his anathema. Frederick responded by trying to capture or sink as many ships carrying prelates to the synod as he could. Eberhard II von Truchsees, Prince-Archbishop of Salzburg, in 1241 at the Council of Regensburg declared that Gregory IX was "that man of perdition, whom they call Antichrist, who in his extravagant boasting says, 'I am God, I cannot err'."

The struggle only ended with Gregory IX's death on 22 August 1241. The pope died before events could reach their climax; it was his successor, Innocent IV, who in 1245 declared a crusade that would finish the Hohenstaufen threat.

== See also ==
- Regulæ Juris
- Vox in Rama - a papal bull issued by Gregory IX in which he allegedly ordered the extermination of black cat populations, which in turn allegedly caused the Black Plague
- Cardinals created by Gregory IX
- Pope Gregory IX and Judaism

== Sources ==
- Brooke, Rosalind B. (2006). The Image of St Francis: Responses to Sainthood in the Thirteenth Century. Cambridge University Press. ISBN 9780521782913.
- Christiansen, Eric (1997). The Northern Crusades. Penguin Publishing Group. ISBN 978-0-14-026653-5.

Catholic Church titles
Preceded by Ottaviano di Paoli	Cardinal-bishop of Ostia; 1206–1227	Succeeded by Rinaldo di Jenne
Preceded by Nicola de Romanis	Dean of the College of Cardinals; 1218–1227	Succeeded by Pelagio Galvani
Preceded by Honorius III	Pope; 1227–41	Succeeded by Celestine IV
