= Konrad von Marburg =

German priest and nobleman (1180–1233)

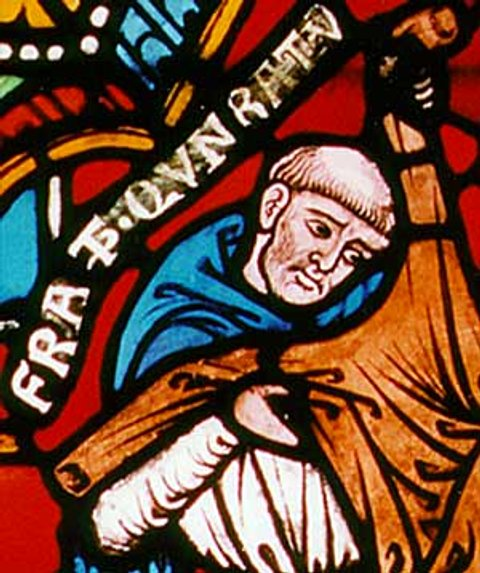
Konrad von Marburg, detail of a 13th-century church window, Elisabeth Church, Marburg.

Konrad von Marburg (sometimes anglicised as Conrad of Marburg) (1180 – 30 July 1233) was a medieval German Catholic priest, inquisitor and nobleman. He is perhaps best known as the spiritual director of Elizabeth of Hungary.

== Life ==
Konrad's early life is not well known, he may be of aristocratic descent which corroborates with contemporary church sources describing him as well-educated and highly knowledgeable.

He was called magister, a proof that he had finished the course of studies at a university, maybe Paris or Bologna. He was noted for his strong asceticism and his excessive zeal in purging the church of heresy and heretics.

Much of his early work within the church was related to the suppression of heresy, and he took an active part in the Albigensian Crusade in southern France. Pope Innocent III, who championed the Medieval Inquisition, was one of Konrad's early supporters. Eventually, however, Konrad returned to Germany, the land of his birth. In particular, Konrad was employed by Louis' wife, Elizabeth of Hungary, to whom Konrad acted as spiritual director.

After receiving a commission from the Archbishop of Mainz, Siegfried II, Konrad set to work seeking out heresy in both Thuringia and Hesse, and quickly gained a reputation for being unreasonable and unjust. According to most accounts, Konrad accepted almost any accusation as true, and regarded suspects as guilty until proven innocent. Those accused of being heretics were quickly sought out by Konrad's mobs, and told to repent or risk being burnt at the stake. Those accused of heresy were also encouraged to denounce others, with the implication that their own lives might be spared if they did so. No respecter of persons, Konrad included nobles and priests in his inquisition: Heinrich Minnike, Provost of Goslar, was one of Konrad's first targets, and was burnt at the stake. In one instance, he treated a penitent with extreme harshness, tricking a widow into some unwitting disobedience and then having her and her maids flogged.

In 1231, Pope Gregory IX granted him permission to ignore standard church procedure for the investigation of heresy. The pope also issued the papal bull Vox in Rama in response to Konrad's allegations, condemning Luciferian. Konrad teamed up with Conrad Dorso and John the One-Eyed in the Upper Rhineland, burning many heretics with barely the semblance of a trial.

In 1233, Konrad accused Henry III, Count of Sayn, of taking part in "Satanic orgies". Henry, however, appealed to an assembly of bishops in Mainz where they decided to postpone a verdict to the discontent of both parties.

== Death ==
Konrad refused to accept the decision and demanded that a verdict be reached, but eventually gave up and left Mainz to return to Marburg. On the road, he was attacked by several knights, who killed both Konrad and his assistant, a Franciscan friar named Gerhard Lutzelkolb.

After Konrad's death, Pope Gregory declared Konrad to have been an upholder of the Christian faith and ordered his killers punished. Perceptions in the German Empire however, were markedly less favorable, and the memory of Konrad was enough to turn opinion against the Italian Inquisition for many years. The reputation he amassed in the course of his years as an inquisitor, gradually spread throughout Europe, overcoming the local boundaries of his original area of activity; and was that of an overly harsh judge. He left an Epistola ad papam de miraculis Sanctae Elisabethae, which was first published at Cologne in 1653.

The place where Konrad was killed, Hof Kapelle near Marburg, is marked with a stone (within the premises of a private farm); it was locally long believed to be haunted and is allegedly today, on certain days, the site of black rites.

== Popular culture ==
- Konrad appears in a work by the English novelist Charles Kingsley, who wrote his Saint's Tragedy about Elisabeth.
- Konrad von Marburg is pictured as the main character in the French comic strip "The Third Testament" by Xavier Dorison and Alex Alice. After hiding for 20 years after being sentenced to death by an Inquisition Tribunal framed by Henry of Sayn, a mellowed and weary Konrad again faces the mysterious Count of Sayn in a race to find a legendary document, the “Third Testament”. The story is a 4-part suite published by Glénat.
- Konrad von Marburg appears as an antagonist in the anime series Radiant.
