= List of creations of cardinals =

List of the promotions of the cardinals of the Holy Roman Church. Dates of the consistories are known or possible to establish only from the pontificate of Pope Gelasius II (1118–1119). Information concerning the number and names of the cardinals created before this pontificate are certainly incomplete. For the later period, the available data are probably complete, but, for some pontificates (particularly in the 12th century), it is impossible to establish the exact number of promotions, because in some cases there are doubts whether the promotion really took place, and in some others it is not possible to ascertain whether the records describe two separate individuals or one individual who held two cardinal titles during his lifetime.

The numbers in the list do not include the cardinals created in pectore whose names were never published, those who declined the appointment, and those who died before their announced promotion took place.

== Until 1099 ==
Period	List	Number of cardinals created
until 7th century	Article	
8th century	Article	
9th century	Article	
904–985	Article	48
985–1049	Article	92
1049–1073	Article	44
1073–1099	Article	

== From 1099 ==
Pope	Pontificate	List	Number of consistories	Number of cardinals
Paschal II	1099–1118	Article	15	92
Gelasius II	1118–1119	Article	1	1
Callixtus II	1119–1124	Article	8	35
Honorius II	1124–1130	Article	6	27
Innocent II	1130–1143	Article	12	76
Antipope Anacletus II	1130–1138	Article	?	14 to 17
Celestine II	1143–1144	Article	1	9
Lucius II	1144–1145	Article	2	11
Eugene III	1145–1153	Article	9	16
Anastasius IV	1153–1154	—	0	0
Adrian IV	1154–1159	Article	3	23
Alexander III	1159–1181	Article	15	68
Antipope Victor IV	1159–1164	Article	?	10 to 13
Antipope Paschal III	1164–1168	Article	?	9
Antipope Callixtus III	1168–1178	Article	?	7
Lucius III	1181–1185	Article	4	15
Urban III	1185–1187	—	0	0
Gregory VIII	1187	—	0	0
Clement III	1187–1191	Article	6	24 to 26
Celestine III	1191–1198	Article	1	5
Innocent III	1198–1216	Article	9 or 10	30 to 32
Honorius III	1216–1227	Article	5	6
Gregory IX	1227–1241	Article	4	10
Celestine IV	1241	—	0	0
Innocent IV	1243–1254	Article	2 or 3	15 or 16
Alexander IV	1254–1261	Article	0 or 1	0 or 1
Urban IV	1261–1264	Article	2	14
Clement IV	1265–1268	—	0	0
Gregory X	1271–1276	Article	1	5
Innocent V	1276	—	0	0
Adrian V	1276	—	0	0
John XXI	1276–1277	—	0	0
Nicholas III	1277–1280	Article	1	9
Martin IV	1281–1285	Article	1	7
Honorius IV	1285–1287	Article	1	1
Nicholas IV	1288–1292	Article	1	6
Celestine V	1294	Article	2	13
Boniface VIII	1294–1303	Article	5	15
Benedict XI	1303–1304	Article	2	2
Clement V	1305–1314	Article	3	24
John XXII	1316–1334	Article	6	28
Antipope Nicholas V	1328–1330	Article	4	9
Benedict XII	1334–1342	Article	1	6
Clement VI	1342–1352	Article	4	25
Innocent VI	1352–1362	Article	3	15
Urban V	1362–1370	Article	4	13
Gregory XI	1370–1378	Article	2	21
Urban VI	1378–1389	Article	4	42
Antipope Clement VII	1378–1394	Article	11	33
Boniface IX	1389–1404	Article	2	6
Antipope Benedict XIII	1394–1422	Article	7	19
Innocent VII	1404–1406	Article	1	11
Gregory XII	1406–1415	Article	2	12
Antipope Alexander V	1409–1410	Article	4	15
Antipope John XXIII	1410–1415	Article	4	15
Martin V	1417–1431	Article	4	17
Eugene IV	1431–1447	Article	6	27
Antipope Felix V	1439–1449	Article	4	14
Nicholas V	1447–1455	Article	3 (or 4)	8 (or 11)
Callixtus III	1455–1458	Article	2	9
Pius II	1458–1464	Article	2	12
Paul II	1464–1471	Article	2	10
Sixtus IV	1471–1484	Article	8	34
Innocent VIII	1484–1492	Article	1	8
Alexander VI	1492–1503	Article	9	43
Pius III	1503	—	0	0
Julius II	1503–1513	Article	6	27
Leo X	1513–1521	Article	8	42
Adrian VI	1522–1523	Article	1	1
Clement VII	1523–1534	Article	14	33
Paul III	1534–1549	Article	12	71
Julius III	1550–1555	Article	4	20
Marcellus II	1555	—	0	0
Paul IV	1555–1559	Article	3	17
Pius IV	1559–1565	Article	4	46
Pius V	1566–1572	Article	3	21
Gregory XIII	1572–1585	Article	9	34
Sixtus V	1585–1590	Article	8	33
Urban VII	1590	—	0	0
Gregory XIV	1590–1591	Article	2	5
Innocent IX	1591	Article	1	2
Clement VIII	1592–1605	Article	6	53
Leo XI	1605	—	0	0
Paul V	1605–1621	Article	10	60
Gregory XV	1621–1623	Article	4	11
Urban VIII	1623–1644	Article	8	74
Innocent X	1644–1655	Article	8	40
Alexander VII	1655–1667	Article	6	38
Clement IX	1667–1669	Article	3	12
Clement X	1670–1676	Article	6	20
Innocent XI	1676–1689	Article	2	43
Alexander VIII	1689–1691	Article	3	14
Innocent XII	1691–1700	Article	4	30
Clement XI	1700–1721	Article	15	69
Innocent XIII	1721–1724	Article	2	3
Benedict XIII	1724–1730	Article	12	29
Clement XII	1730–1740	Article	15	35
Benedict XIV	1740–1758	Article	7	64
Clement XIII	1758–1769	Article	7	52
Clement XIV	1769–1774	Article	12	17
Pius VI	1775–1799	Article	23	73
Pius VII	1800–1823	Article	19	99
Leo XII	1823–1829	Article	8	25
Pius VIII	1829–1830	Article	3	6
Gregory XVI	1831–1846	Article	24	75
Pius IX	1846–1878	Article	23	123
Leo XIII	1878–1903	Article	27	147
Pius X	1903–1914	Article	7	50
Benedict XV	1914–1922	Article	5	32
Pius XI	1922–1939	Article	17	76
Pius XII	1939–1958	Article	2	56
John XXIII	1958–1963	Article	5	52
Paul VI	1963–1978	Article	6	143
John Paul I	1978	—	0	0
John Paul II	1978–2005	Article	9	231
Benedict XVI	2005–2013	Article	5	90
Francis	2013–2025	Article	10	163
Leo XIV	2025–		0	0

== See also ==
- College of Cardinals

== Bibliography ==
- Cheney, David M. "Consistories". Catholic-Hierarchy.org. ^{[self-published]}
- Miranda, Salvador. "Essay of a General List of Cardinals (494-2019)". The Cardinals of the Holy Roman Church. Florida International University. OCLC 53276621.
- Konrad Eubel, Hierarchia Catholica, vol. I-VI, Münster 1913-1960
- Otto Kares, Chronologie der Kardinalbischöfe im elften Jahrhundert, (in:) Festschrift zur Jahrhundertfeier des Gymnasiums am Burgplatz in Essen, Essen 1924
- Barbara Zenker, Die Mitglieder des Kardinalkollegiums von 1130 bis 1159, Würzburg 1964
- Hans Walter Klewitz, Reformpapsttum und Kardinalkolleg, Darmstadt 1957
- Rudolf Hüls, Kardinäle, Klerus und Kirchen Roms: 1049–1130 Bibliothek des Deutschen Historischen Instituts in Rom. Tübingen: Max Niemeyer Verlag, 1977
- Elfriede Kartusch, Das Kardinalskollegium in der Zeit von 1181-1227, Wien 1948
- Johannes M. Brixius, Die Mitglieder des Kardinalkollegiums von 1130-1181, Berlin 1912
- Werner Maleczek, Papst und Kardinalskolleg von 1191 bis 1216, Wien 1984
- Klaus Ganzer, Die Entwicklung des auswärtigen Kardinalats im hohen Mittelalter, Bibliothek des Deutschen Historischen Instituts in Rom. Tübingen: Max Niemeyer Verlag 1963
- Agostino Paravicini Bagliani, Cardinali di curia e "familiae" cardinalizie dal 1227 al 1254, Padova 1972
- J. P. Migne: Patrologia Latina
- Giandomenico Mansi, «Sacrorum Conciliorum Nova Amplissima Collectio»
- Phillipp Jaffé, Regesta pontificum Romanorum ab condita Ecclesia ad annum post Christum natum MCXCVIII, vol. I-II. Leipzig 1885-1888
- Paul Fridolin Kehr: Regesta pontificum Romanorum. Italia Pontificia. Vol. I–X SUL Books in the Public Domain
- Pius Bonifatius Gams, Series episcoporum Ecclesiae catholicae, quotquot innotuerunt a beato Petro apostolo Wielkopolska Biblioteka Cyfrowa
