= Gilo of Toucy =

French poet, priest, monk and cleric

Gilo of Toucy, also called Gilo of Paris or Gilo of Tusculum (died 1139×1142), was a French poet and cleric. A priest before he became a monk at Cluny, he was appointed cardinal-bishop of Tusculum sometime between 1121 and 1123. He served as a papal legate on four occasions: to Poland and Hungary around 1124, to Carinthia in 1126, to the Crusader states in 1128 or 1129 and to Aquitaine from 1131 until 1137. He took the side of the Antipope Anacletus II in the papal schism of 1130 and was deposed as cardinal-bishop by the Second Lateran Council in 1139.

An accomplished Latin stylist, Gilo wrote the majority of the Historia de via Hierosolymitana, a verse history of the First Crusade (1096–1099). He also wrote the Vita sancti Hugonis abbatis Cluniacensis, a biography of Abbot Hugh of Cluny (1024–1109). A couple of letters he wrote in connection with his third legation have also survived and are highly regarded for their style and eloquence.

== Life ==
=== Paris and Cluny ===
Gilo's birth date is unknown, but may be placed in the final quarter of the 11th century. His birthplace was Toucy in the county of Auxerre, but he was living in Paris when he wrote the Historia, as he says in Book IX: "Gilo, a resident of Paris and a native of Toucy, which by no means disowns me." According to the prologue to Book IV, he was already of advanced age when he wrote it. He had tried at least once before to write an epic poem and had written light verse in his youth. In the explicit of two manuscripts, Gilo is said to have been a cleric of the diocese of Paris at the time he wrote the Historia, which was before he became a monk. He was writing before 1120, probably in the first decade of the 12th century.

Gilo entered the Benedictine abbey of Cluny during the abbacy of Pons of Melgueil (1109–1122). On account of his literary reputation, he was tasked by Pons with writing a biography of Hugh of Semur, Pons's predecessor as abbot. This work was not completed before Hugh's canonization, which was celebrated at Cluny by Pope Calixtus II on 6 January 1120. This was probably the occasion on which Gilo joined the papal entourage. He wrote most of his Vita sancti Hugonis in Rome, as he says in the dedicatory epistle addressed to Pons.

=== Becoming a cardinal ===
In Rome, Gilo was elected bishop of Tusculum and created a cardinal by Calixtus II. Accounts differ about the date of his elevation. According to some sources, his is the third signature on the papal bull Ad universos fideles dated 28 December 1121, where his name appears as Aegidius Tusculanus episcopus. According to others, he is first attested as a cardinal-bishop only in a papal bull of 6 April 1123. His predecessor, Divitius, is said to have signed a papal privilege on 16 May 1122. His consecration may have taken place on 20 September or 20 December 1122 or possibly as late as 7 March 1123. It was considered a great honour to be elevated to a cardinal-bishopric without first having been a deacon or presbyter.

Gilo spent most of 1123 with Calixtus and the papal entourage. He stayed with the pope in Benevento in September and October. Between April 1123 and March 1125, he is absent from papal records. He is again absent between May 1125 and May 1128. These periods correspond to his service as a papal legate abroad.

=== Polish and Carinthian legations ===
Gilo served as a legate in Poland and Hungary in the 1120s, but the exact time of this legation is uncertain. It most likely took place before the death of Calixtus II in December 1124. It is known only from copies of documents in later Polish cartularies. At the request of Duke Bolesław III, Gilo confirmed the possessions of the Benedictine monastery of Tyniec acquired in 1105 and the boundaries of the new diocese of Włocławek. Pope Eugenius III issued a confirmation of Gilo's acts in April 1148. Gilo could not have been in Poland in mid-1125. On 7 March 1125, he signed a privilege of Pope Honorius II in Rome. He is also mentioned in Roman documents of April and May 1125.

In the late 1120s, Gilo undertook a second legation to the southeast of the Holy Roman Empire. In 1126, he consecrated a cemetery for the Benedictine abbey of Arnoldstein in the diocese of Aquileia in the Duchy of Carinthia. This is known only from a 15th-century copy of the document. His remit almost certainly extended beyond Carinthia and 1126, since he is only seen again at Rome on 7 May 1128, when he signed a privilege of Honorius II.

Given the uncertainty in their date, Gilo's Polish and Carinthian visits are sometimes combined into a single legatine mission, in either 1123–1125 or 1125–1128.

=== Levantine legation ===
The purpose of Gilo's third legation was to resolve the dispute over the status of the archdiocese of Tyre, whether it was a suffragan of the patriarchate of Antioch or Jerusalem. In 1127, Honorius II ruled in favour of Jerusalem, but Patriarch Bernard of Antioch refused to recognise the decision. Patriarch Warmund of Jerusalem consecrated William I as archbishop of Tyre. In 1128 William arrived in Rome to receive his pallium. Honorius granted it and restated his ruling of the previous year, sending Gilo, an experienced legate, to enforce it.

Gilo's third mission is better known than his first two. He embarked for the Holy Land in the first half of July 1128 in Bari, taking the same ship as the archbishop of Tyre. Two of Gilo's letters survive, including one addressed to Bernard. Archbishop William II of Tyre mentions it in his Historia, while praising Gilo as a "most eloquent and literate man" and his letters as "very famous". The mission was ultimately a failure. Bernard never relented before his death in 1135. Some sources have Gilo returning to Rome in December 1128 and signing papal privileges in March and April 1129, while others have him in the Holy Land in 1129–1130.

=== Papal schism ===
In the disputed papal election of February 1130, Gilo took the side of Anacletus II, afterwards regarded as an antipope, against Innocent II. This was probably an act of Cluniac solidarity, since Anacletus had studied at Cluny. Cluny itself, however, sided with Innocent. Abbot Peter the Venerable wrote a letter dated no later than 1134 encouraging Gilo to change sides. In early 1131, Gilo was sent by Anacletus to be his legate in southern France (i.e., the Duchy of Aquitaine), where Anacletus' main supporter was Bishop Gerard of Angoulême. Although Gilo remained in France for several years, Gerard took the leading role in converting the French aristocracy to their faction.

Soon after Gilo's arrival, Gerard was elected archbishop of Bordeaux. In the summer of 1131, in one of the archbishop's first acts, he granted the church of Saint-Pierre-de-Bensac to the abbey of Sainte-Croix. Gilo, joined by cardinals Gregory of Santa Maria in Aquiro and Roman of Sant'Adriano al Foro, was present in Bordeaux to witness this. Afterwards, he took up residence in Poitiers, where Peter the Venerable visited him in the spring of 1133.

In 1135, Gilo was excommunicated by Innocent II's legate, Geoffrey of Chartres. This did not induce a change of position. That year he authenticated with his seal an agreement between a knight and the abbey of Saint-Hilaire in Poitiers. Also that year in Poitiers, acting in his capacity as papal legate, he resolved a dispute between the abbey of Montierneuf and its dependency of Foye-Montjault.

Gerard died in March 1136 and that year Duke William X of Aquitaine abandoned the cause of Anacletus, making Gilo's position in Poitiers difficult. He met Peter the Venerable in Grenoble in 1137, but it was only after the death of Anacletus on 25 January 1138 and a second letter from Peter that he reconciled himself to Innocent II. He returned to Rome and was readmitted as a cardinal. In this capacity he signed papal documents on 21 June 1138 and continued at the papal court until 29 March 1139, signing documents on 26 July 1138 and on 7 and 28 February and 2 March 1139. During the Second Lateran Council in April, however, he was denounced along with the other followers of Anacletus and deposed.

Gilo is never mentioned again after his deposition. Probably he died not long after. He was dead by 19 April 1142, when Imarus is first recorded as cardinal-bishop of Tusculum.

== Works ==
=== Historia ===
The Historia de via Hierosolymitana is a verse history of the First Crusade. It, or at least the part written by Gilo, is preserved in five manuscripts. A sixth manuscript contains additional sections written by an anonymous poet called "Fulco" or the "Charleville poet". Although both poets have a classicizing tendency, Gilo is the more learned. His Latin and his hexameters are of high quality for the 12th century. The hero of his account is Bohemond of Taranto, while the Charleville poet prefers Godfrey of Bouillon.

The work in its fullest form is divided into nine books, but Gilo's original work apparently only contained five, one each on the siege of Nicaea; the first siege of Antioch; the second siege of Antioch; the capture of Bara, Maʿarrat an-Nuʿman and Tartus; and the fall of Jerusalem. With the Charleville poet's additions, these became books IV, V, VII, VIII, and IX. There are unique details in Gilo's work that suggest that he had access to eyewitnesses.

=== Vita ===
The Vita sancti Hugonis abbatis Cluniacensis was mostly written between the canonization of Hugh (1120) and the resignation of Pons (1122). Gilo's is just one of eight biographies of Hugh of Semur, but it is the most detailed. Pons also asked Ezelo of Liège and Hildebert of Lavardin to write biographies of Hugh. That of Ezelo is lost, but may have been used by Gilo as a source. Gilo also had access to eyewitnesses and acquaintances of Hugh at Cluny. Hildebert made use of Gilo's Vita for his own more famous biography.

Gilo's biography was designed for spiritually edification. It devotes most of its space to Hugh's virtues and miracles. His political activities during the Investiture Contest and his construction a new church at Cluny are covered tersely.

The Vita is preserved in two manuscripts, now in the Bibliothèque nationale de France, Lat. 12607 and Lat. 13090.
