= Cardinals created by Innocent VIII =

Catholic appointments in 1489

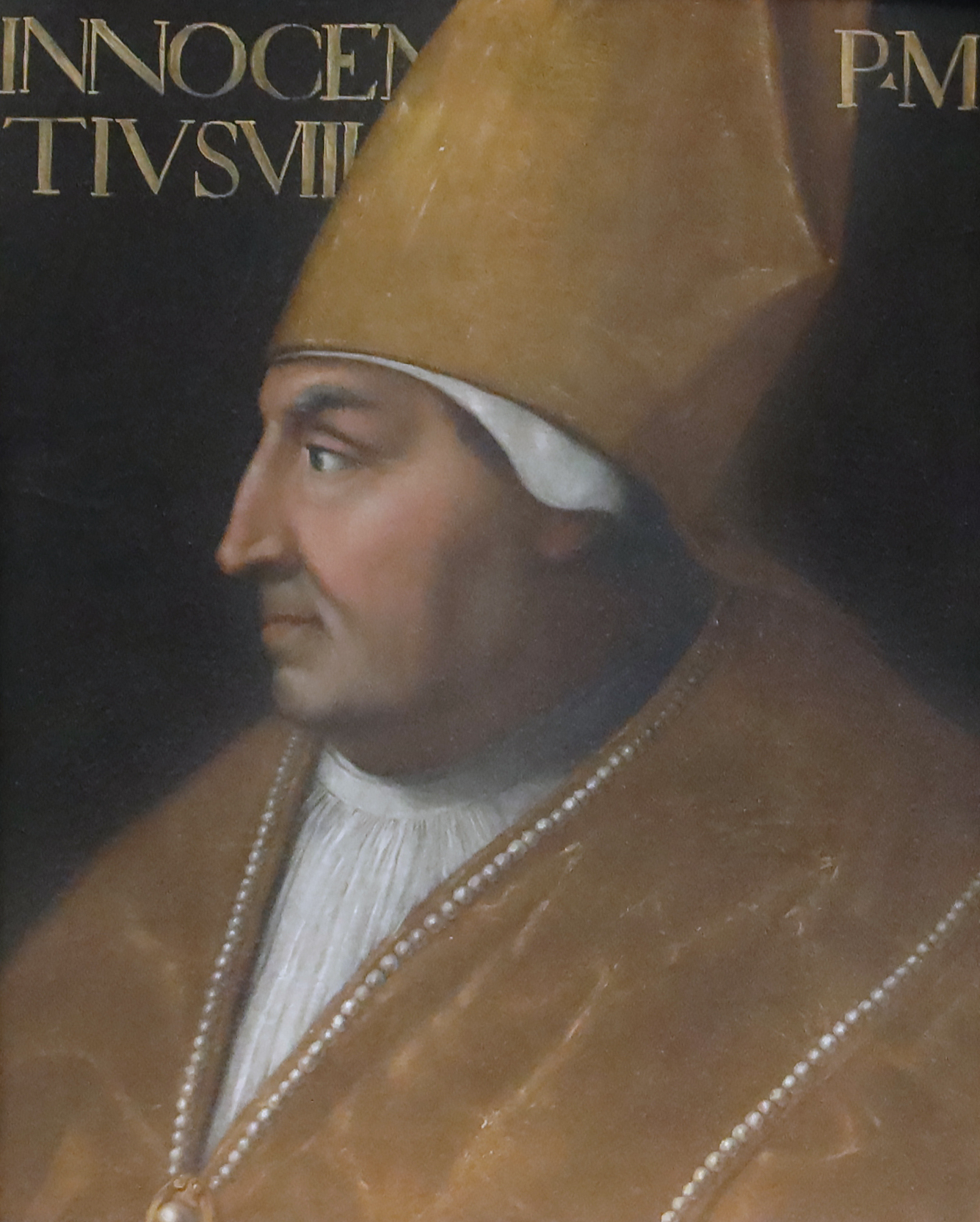
Pope Innocent VIII (r. 1484–1492)

Pope Innocent VIII (r. 1484–1492) created eight new cardinals in one consistory on 9 March 1489, although the names of two of them were published only after his death:

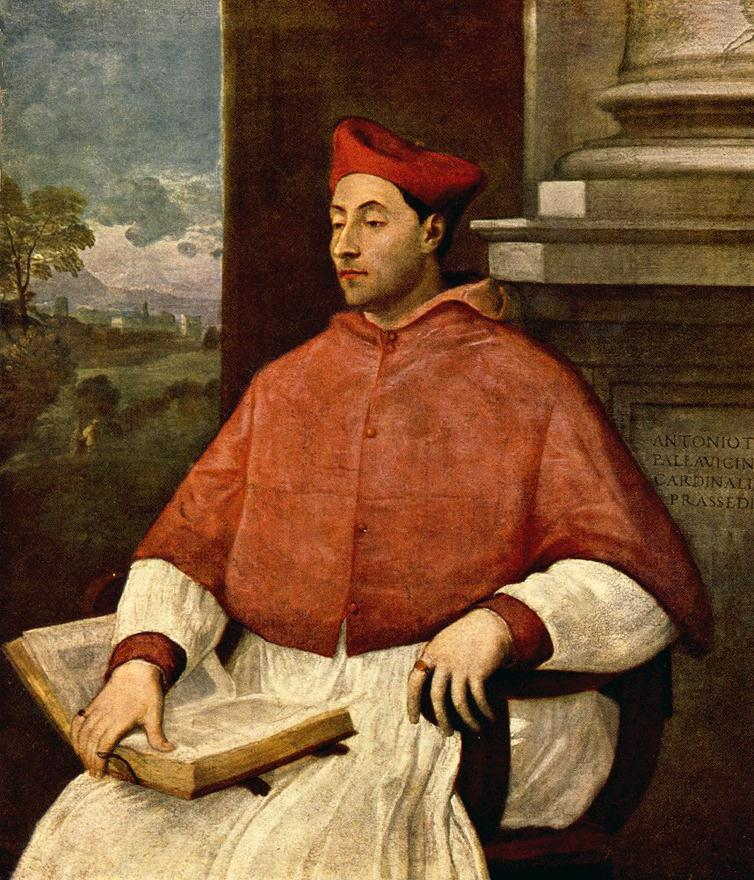
Antonio Pallavicini Gentili (1441-1507), made a cardinal on March 23, 1489.

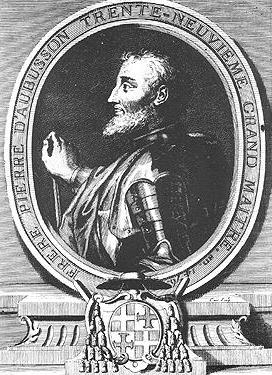
Pierre d'Aubusson (1423-1503), made a cardinal on March 23, 1489.

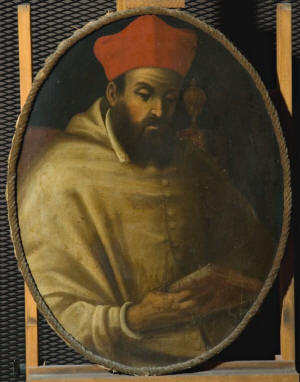
Maffeo Gherardi (1406-92), made a cardinal on August 3, 1492.

1. Lorenzo Cybo de Mari, nephew of the Pope and archbishop of Benevento – cardinal priest of S. Susanna (received the title on 23 March 1489), then cardinal priest of S. Cecilia (1490), cardinal-priest of S. Marco (1496), cardinal bishop of Albano (14 May 1501) and cardinal bishop of Palestrina (29 November 1503), † 21 December 1503
2. Ardicino della Porta, bishop of Aleria and papal secretary – cardinal priest of SS. Giovanni e Paolo (received the title on 23 March 1489), † 4 February 1493
3. Antonio Pallavicini Gentili, papal datary and bishop of Orense – cardinal priest of S. Anastasia (received the title on 23 March 1489), then cardinal priest of S. Prassede (31 August 1492), cardinal bishop of Tusculum (10 April 1503), cardinal bishop of Palestrina (22 December 1503), † 10 September 1507
4. André d'Espinay, archbishop of Bordeaux – cardinal priest of SS. Silvestro e Martino (received the title on 23 March 1489), † 10 November 1500
5. Pierre d'Aubusson, O.S.Io.Hieros., Grand Master of his Order on Rodos – cardinal deacon of S. Adriano (received the title on 23 March 1489), † 3 July 1503
6. Giovanni de' Medici, protonotary apostolic, son of Lorenzo de Medici (in pectore, published on 26 March 1492) – cardinal deacon of S. Maria in Domnica, on 11 March 1513 became Pope Leo X, † 1 December 1521
7. Federico di Sanseverino, protonotary apostolic (in pectore, published on 26 July 1492, after the death of the Pope) – cardinal deacon of S. Teodoro (received the title in 1492), then cardinal deacon of S. Angelo (17 March 1511); deposed and excommunicated on 24 October 1511, reinstated as cardinal deacon of S. Angelo on 27 June 1513, † 7 August 1516
8. Maffeo Gherardi, O.S.B.Cam., patriarch of Venice (in pectore, published on 3 August 1492, after the death of the Pope) – cardinal priest of SS. Sergio e Bacco (received the title in 1492), † 14 September 1492

== Sources ==
- Williams, George L. (1998). Papal Genealogy: The Families and Descendants of the Popes. McFarland & Co. Inc.
- Miranda, Salvador. "Consistories for the creation of Cardinals 15th Century (1394-1503):Innocent VIII (1484-1492)". The Cardinals of the Holy Roman Church. Florida International University. OCLC 53276621.
- Konrad Eubel: Hierarchia Catholica, vol. II i III, Münster 1914-1922
