= Cardinals created by Alexander IV =

Catholic appointments in 1255

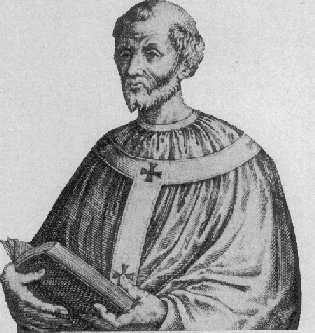
Pope Alexander IV.

Pope Alexander IV (r. 1254–61) created two cardinals in two consistories during his pontificate.

== August 1255 ==
There are sources that pinpoint this allocation as having taken place over the course of some months but there is no definitive date for it. (Note: It is said in some sources that this took place between 17 August 1255 and 1 February 1256.)

- Riccardo di Montecassino O.S.B.

== December 1255 ==
- Tesauro dei Beccheria O.S.B. Vall.

== Sources ==
- Miranda, Salvador. "Consistories for the creation of Cardinals 13th Century (1198-1303): Alexander IV". The Cardinals of the Holy Roman Church. Florida International University. OCLC 53276621.
