= Cardinals created by Innocent IV =

Catholic appointments from 1244 to 1251

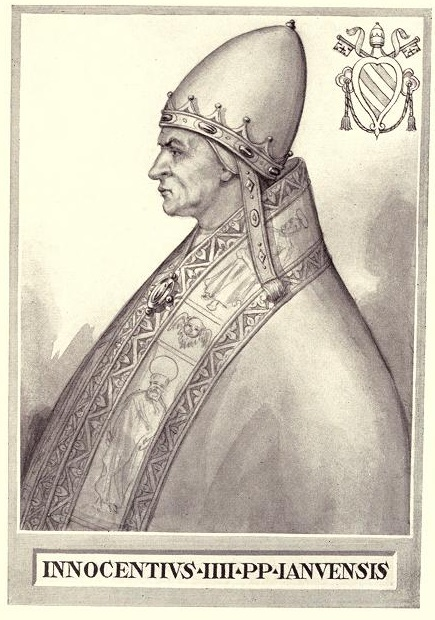
Pope Innocent IV.

Pope Innocent IV (r. 1243–1254) created fifteen cardinals in two consistories he held during his pontificate; this included his future successors Nicholas III in 1244 and Adrian V in 1251.

== 28 May 1244 ==
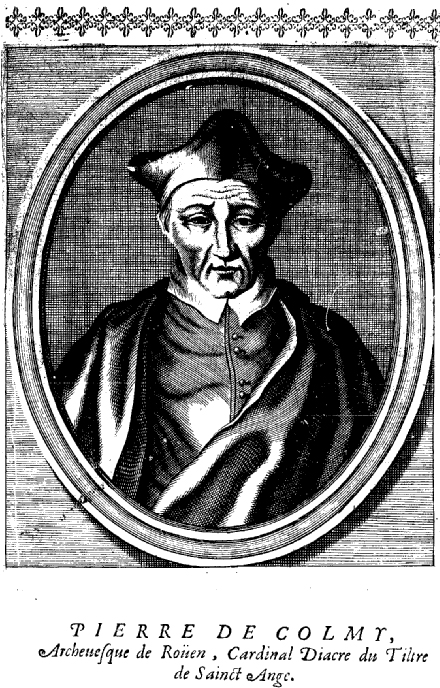
Pierre de Colmieu was created a cardinal in 1244.

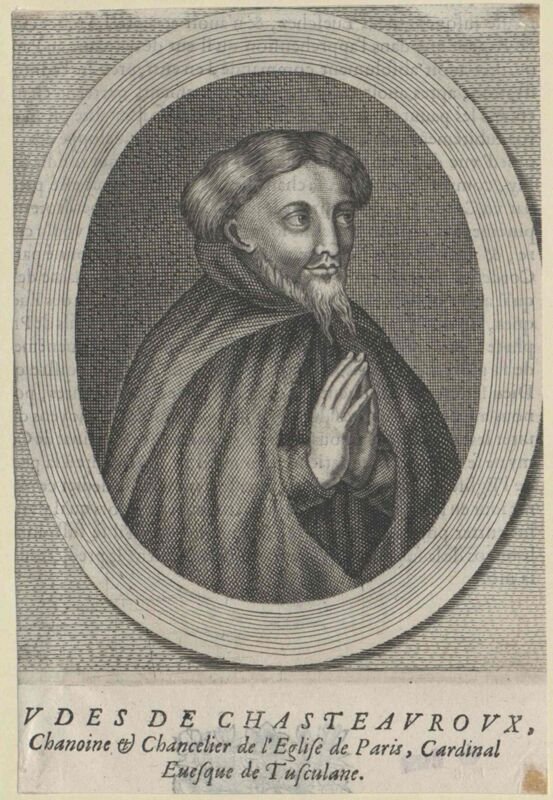
Eudes de Châteauroux was created a cardinal in 1244.

- Pietro da Collemezzo (Pierre de Colmieu), Archbishop of Rouen
- Guglielmo di Modena O.Carth.
- Eudes de Châteauroux
- Pierre de Bar
- Guillaume de Talliante O.S.B. Clun.
- John of Toledo O.Cist.
- Hugues de Saint-Cher O.P.
- Goffredo da Trani
- Ottaviano Ubaldini
- Pietro Capocci
- Giovanni Gaetano Orsini (Note: Elected as Pope Nicholas III in 1277 and reigned until his death in 1280.)
- Guglielmo Fieschi
- Otto of Tonengo, transferred from San Nicola in Carcere to Porto e Santa Rufina

== December 1251 ==
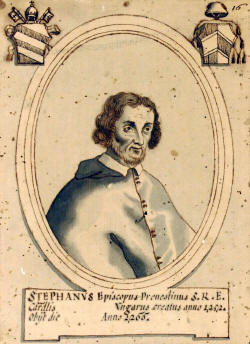
István Báncsa was created a cardinal in 1251.

- Giacomo da Castell'Arquato
- István Báncsa
- Ottobono Fieschi (Note: Elected as Pope Adrian in 1276 and reigned until his death just over a month following his election.)

== Sources ==
- Miranda, Salvador. "Consistories for the creation of Cardinals 13th Century (1198-1303): Innocent IV (1243-1254)". The Cardinals of the Holy Roman Church. Florida International University. OCLC 53276621.
