= Cardinals created by Innocent II =

Catholic appointments from 1130 to 1142

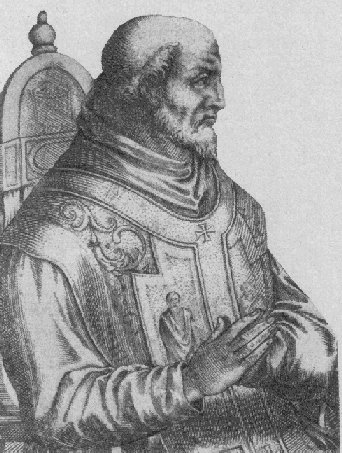
Pope Innocent II.

Pope Innocent II (r. 1130–1143) created 76 cardinals in twelve consistories held throughout his pontificate. The pope created as cardinals his future successor Lucius III and the antipope Victor IV.

== 1130 ==
- Balduino da Pisa O.Cist.
- Pietro
- Stanzio
- Luc O.Cist.
- Adinolfo O.S.B.
- Innocenzo Savelli
- Gregorio
- Siro
- Azzone degli Atti
- Odone Fattiboni
- Gaymer
- Guido da Vico
- Guido
- Guido
- Alberto Teodoli
- Silvano
- Vassalo
- Lucio Boezio O.S.B. Vall.
- Vitale Savelli

== 1132 ==
- Martino O.Cist.

== 1133 ==
- Pietro O.S.B. Cas.
- Ubaldo da Lunata
- Angelo
- Guido
- Ubaldo

== 1134 ==
- Drogon O.S.B.
- Theodwin Can. Reg. O.S.A.
- Stefano
- Gregorio Papareschi iuniore
- Chrysogone O.S.B.
- Gerardo
- Pietro

== 1135 ==
- Ugo
- Griffone
- Yves Can. Reg.

== 1136 ==
- Alberto
- Bernardo

== 1137 ==
- Stanzio
- Cosma

== 1138 ==
- Albéric O.S.B. Clun.
- Guido Bellagi
- Gregorio
- Raniero
- Matteo
- Goizzone
- Ottaviano de' Monticelli (Note: Elected as Antipope Victor IV and reigned as such from 1159 until his death in 1164.)
- Ribaldo
- Ubaldo

== 1139 ==
- Hugh de Saint-Victor Can. Reg. O.S.A.
- Etienne O.Cist.
- Egmondo
- Presbitero
- Rabaldo
- Tommaso
- Raniero
- Goizo
- Aimerico
- Presbitero

== 17 December 1140 ==
- Pietro
- Longino
- Tommaso Can. Reg.
- Rainaldo di Collemezzo O.S.B. Cas.
- Ubaldo
- Pietro
- Pietro
- Guido Moricotti
- Niccolò
- Hugues de Foliet O.S.B.
- Guido di Castelfidardo

== 1141 ==
- Ubaldo Allucingoli O.Cist. (Note: Elected as Pope Lucius III and reigned from 1181 until his death in 1185.)
- Gilberto
- Gregorio

== March 1142 ==
- Imar O.S.B.
- Pietro Papareschi
- Robert Pullen
- Bd. Konrad von Bayern O.Cist.

== Sources ==
- Miranda, Salvador. "Consistories for the creation of Cardinals 12th Century (1099-1198): Innocent II (1130-1143)". The Cardinals of the Holy Roman Church. Florida International University. OCLC 53276621.
