= Cardinals created by Gelasius II =

Catholic appointments in 1118

Pope Gelasius II created only one cardinal in one consistory:

== 9 March 1118 ==
- Pietro Ruffino, nephew of Paschal II – cardinal-deacon of San Adriano, then cardinal-priest of SS. Silvestro e Martino (9 March 1123), † 1131/32

== Bibliography ==
- Hüls, Rudolf (1977). Kardinäle, Klerus und Kirchen Roms: 1049–1130. Bibliothek des Deutschen Historischen Instituts in Rom (in German). Tübingen: Max Niemeyer Verlag. ISBN 978-3-484-80071-7.
- Klewitz, Hans-Walter (1957). Reformpapsttum und Kardinalkolleg. Die Entstehung des Kardinalkollegiums. Studien über die Wiederherstellung der römischen Kirche in Süditalien durch das Reformpapsttum. Das Ende des Reformpapsttums (in German). Darmstadt: Hermann Gentner Verlag.

Catholic Church titles
Preceded by Paschal II	Creation of Cardinals; 1118, 1119	Succeeded by Callixtus II
