= Historia de via Hierosolymitana =

The Historia de via Hierosolymitana is a Latin epic verse history of the First Crusade. Originally composed before 1120 as a work in five books by Gilo of Toucy, it was expanded by the addition of four more by an anonymous poet known as "Fulco" or simply the "Charleville Poet". Although neither poet was an eyewitness, there are unique details in Gilo's work that suggest he had access to eyewitnesses.

== Date and authorship ==
Gilo, a native of Toucy, wrote while he was a cleric in Paris before he joined the abbey of Cluny or became cardinal-bishop of Tusculum. His portion of the Historia must have been completed before 1120 at the latest. It was probably written in the first decade of the century. The anonymous, however, implies that King Baldwin I of Jerusalem was dead at the time of his writing, which places his additions after 1118.

Since Jacques Sirmond in the seventeenth century, the author of the first three books of the Historia has been known by the name Fulco (Fulk). There is no evidence that this was the poet's actual name, although it has been suggested that he was the Magister Fulco who was a schoolmaster and dean at Reims Cathedral from 1165 to 1175. Internal evidence suggests that the poet hailed from the County of Champagne in France or from the vicinity of Bouillon in the Duchy of Lower Lorraine.

== Manuscripts ==
The work of Gilo survives in at least seven manuscripts, but that of the anonymous in only one. Paul Riant assigned these manuscripts sigla (letters) and they fall into two recensions: ADG and BCF with E being a copy of D. G, which is manuscript 97 in the municipal library of Charleville-Mézières, contains the only copy of the anonymous additions.

The entire Charleville manuscript is the work of a single hand. Bound between wooden boards, its originally binding survives. It is a parchment palimpsest and almost certainly a private work done for an individual and not a library. Besides the Historia, it contains works by Avitus of Vienne and the Ecloga of Theodulus. These were popular texts in the schools and the owner of the manuscript may have been a teacher.

== Structure and style ==
The work in its fullest form is divided into nine books. The first three and the sixth are the work of the anonymous, while the fourth and fifth contain material from both poets. The final three are from the pen of Gilo. The work is structured as follows:

1. Council of Clermont (1095)
2. Peasants' Crusade (1096)
3. Princes' Crusade at Constantinople (1097)
4. Siege of Nicaea (1097)
5. First siege of Antioch (1097–1098)
6. Establishment of the county of Edessa (1098)
7. Second siege of Antioch (1098)
8. Capture of Bara, Maʿarrat an-Nuʿman and Tartus (1098–1099)
9. Capture of Jerusalem (1099)

The Historia is composed in dactylic hexameters with the occasional Leonine rhyme. Although both poets have a classicizing tendency, Gilo is the more learned. His Latin and his hexameters are of high quality for the twelfth century. He is more restrained than his anonymous counterpart, employs more Leonine rhyme and makes extensive use of zeugma and the ablative absolute. He often uses periodic sentences and subordinate clauses where the anonymous prefers a linear style and parataxis. Both poets include many speeches, with Gilo preferring to use oratio recta (direct quotation) and the anonymous oratio obliqua.

The hero of Gilo's poem is Bohemond of Taranto, while that of the anonymous is Godfrey of Bouillon.

== Editions ==
- Grocock, C. W.; Siberry, J. E., eds. (1997). The Historia Vie Hierosolimitane of Gilo of Paris. Clarendon Press.
- Riant, P., ed. (1895). "Historia gestorum viae nostri temporis Hierosolymitanae". Recueil des historiens des croisades, Occidentaux, V, pt. 2. Paris. pp. 695–800.
