= Cardinals created by Alexander VII =

Catholic appointments from 1657 to 1667

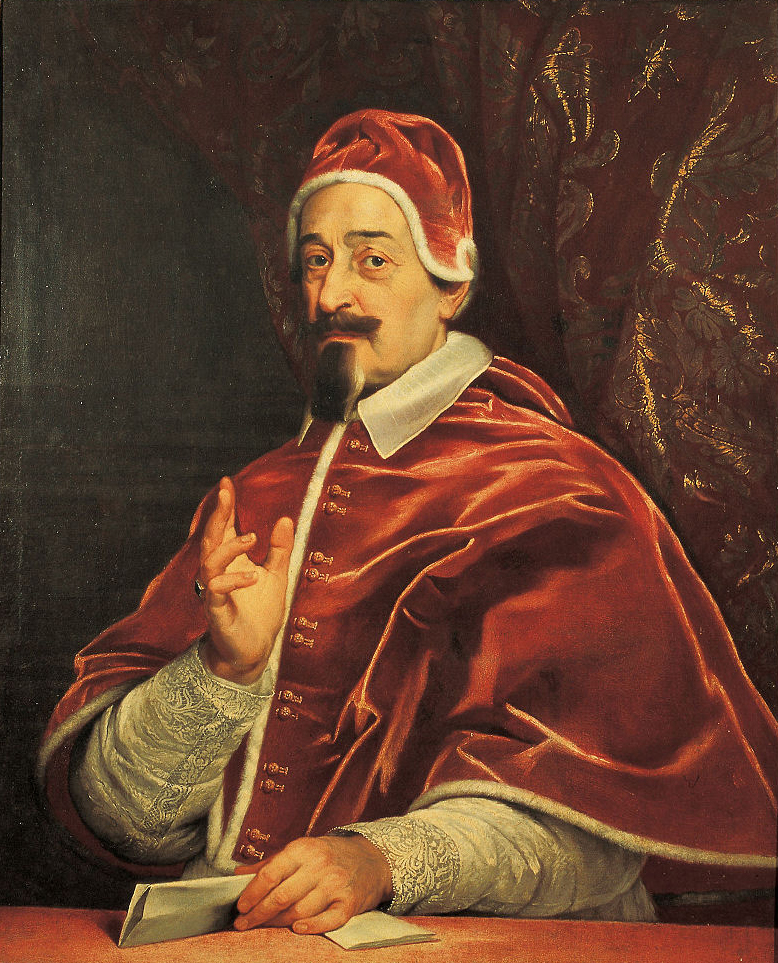
Pope Alexander VII (1559-1667).

Pope Alexander VII (r. 1655–1667) created thirty eight new cardinals in six consistories:

== 9 April 1657 ==
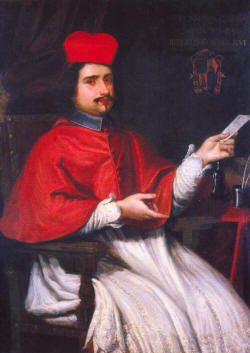
Flavio Chigi (1631-1693), made a cardinal on April 9, 1657.

1. Flavio Chigi, Cardinal-Nephew – cardinal-priest of S. Maria del Popolo (received the title on 23 April 1657), then cardinal-bishop of Albano (18 March 1686), cardinal-bishop of Porto e S. Rufina (19 October 1689), † 13 September 1693
2. Camillo Melzi, archbishop of Capua – cardinal-priest of S. Marcello (received the title on 23 April 1657), † 21 January 1659
3. Giulio Rospigliosi, titular archbishop of Tarso, secretary of state – cardinal-priest of S. Sisto (received the title on 23 April 1657); became Pope Clement IX on 20 June 1667, † 9 December 1669
4. Nicola Guido di Bagno, titular archbishop of Athens – cardinal-priest of S. Eusebio (received the title on 23 April 1657), † 27 August 1663
5. Girolamo Buonvisi, titular archbishop of Laodicea – cardinal-priest of S. Girolamo degli Schiavoni (received the title on 23 April 1657), † 21 February 1677
6. Francesco Paolucci – cardinal-priest of S. Giovanni a Porta Latina (received the title on 23 April 1657), † 9 July 1661
7. Scipione Pannocchieschi d’Elci, archbishop of Pisa (created in pectore, published on 29 April 1658) – cardinal-priest of S. Sabina (received the title on 6 May 1658), † 12 April 1670
8. Girolamo Farnese, titular archbishop of Patras (created in pectore, published on 29 April 1658) – cardinal-priest of S. Agnese fuori le mura (received the title on 6 May 1658), † 18 February 1668
9. Antonio Bichi, bishop of Osimo (created in pectore, published on 10 November 1659) – cardinal-priest of S. Agostino (received the title on 1 December 1659), then cardinal-priest of S. Maria degli Angeli (14 November 1667), cardinal-bishop of Palestrina (3 March 1687), † 21 February 1691
10. Francesco Maria Sforza Pallavicino, S.J. (created in pectore, published on 10 November 1659) – cardinal-priest of S. Salvatore in Lauro (received the title on 6 December 1660), † 5 June 1667

== 29 April 1658 ==
Note: all these cardinals were created in pectore and published on 5 April 1660. They received their titular churches on 19 April 1660.

1. Volumnio Bandinelli – cardinal-priest of SS. Silvestro e Martino, † 5 June 1667
2. Odoardo Vecchiarelli – cardinal-deacon of SS. Cosma e Damiano, † 31 July 1667
3. Giacomo Franzoni, treasurer general of Apostolic Chamber – cardinal-deacon of S. Maria in Aquiro, then cardinal-deacon of S. Maria in Cosmedin (14 January 1669), cardinal-priest of S. Pancrazio (14 May 1670), cardinal-priest of S. Maria in Aracoeli (27 February 1673), cardinal-priest of S. Maria della Pace (30 April 1685), cardinal-bishop of Frascati (10 November 1687), cardinal-bishop of Porto e S. Rufina (28 September 1693), † 19 December 1697

== 5 April 1660 ==
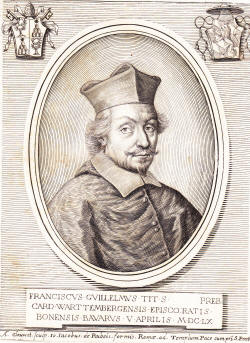
Franz Wilhelm von Wartenberg (1593-1661), made a cardinal on April 5, 1660.

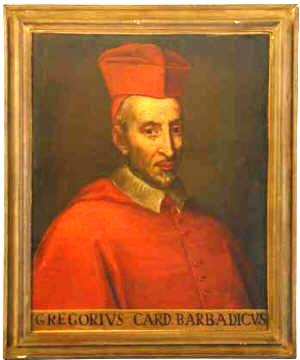
Gregorio Barbarigo (1625-97), made a cardinal on April 5, 1660.

1. Franz Wilhelm von Wartenberg, bishop of Regensburg – cardinal-priest without the title, † 1 December 1661
2. Pietro Vidoni, bishop of Lodi – cardinal-priest of S. Callisto (received the title on 4 July 1661), then cardinal-priest of S. Pancrazio (13 March 1673), † 5 January 1681
3. Gregorio Giovanni Gasparo Barbarigo, bishop of Bergamo – cardinal-priest of S. Tommaso in Parione (received the title on 21 June 1660), then cardinal-priest of S. Marco (13 September 1677), † 18 June 1697
4. Pascual de Aragón-Córdoba-Cardona y Fernández de Córdoba – cardinal-priest of S. Balbina (received the title on 21 November 1661, † 28 September 1677
5. Francesco Maria Mancini – cardinal-deacon of SS. Vito e Modesto (received the title on 19 April 1660), then cardinal-priest of S. Matteo in Merulana (14 May 1670), † 29 June 1672

== 14 January 1664 ==
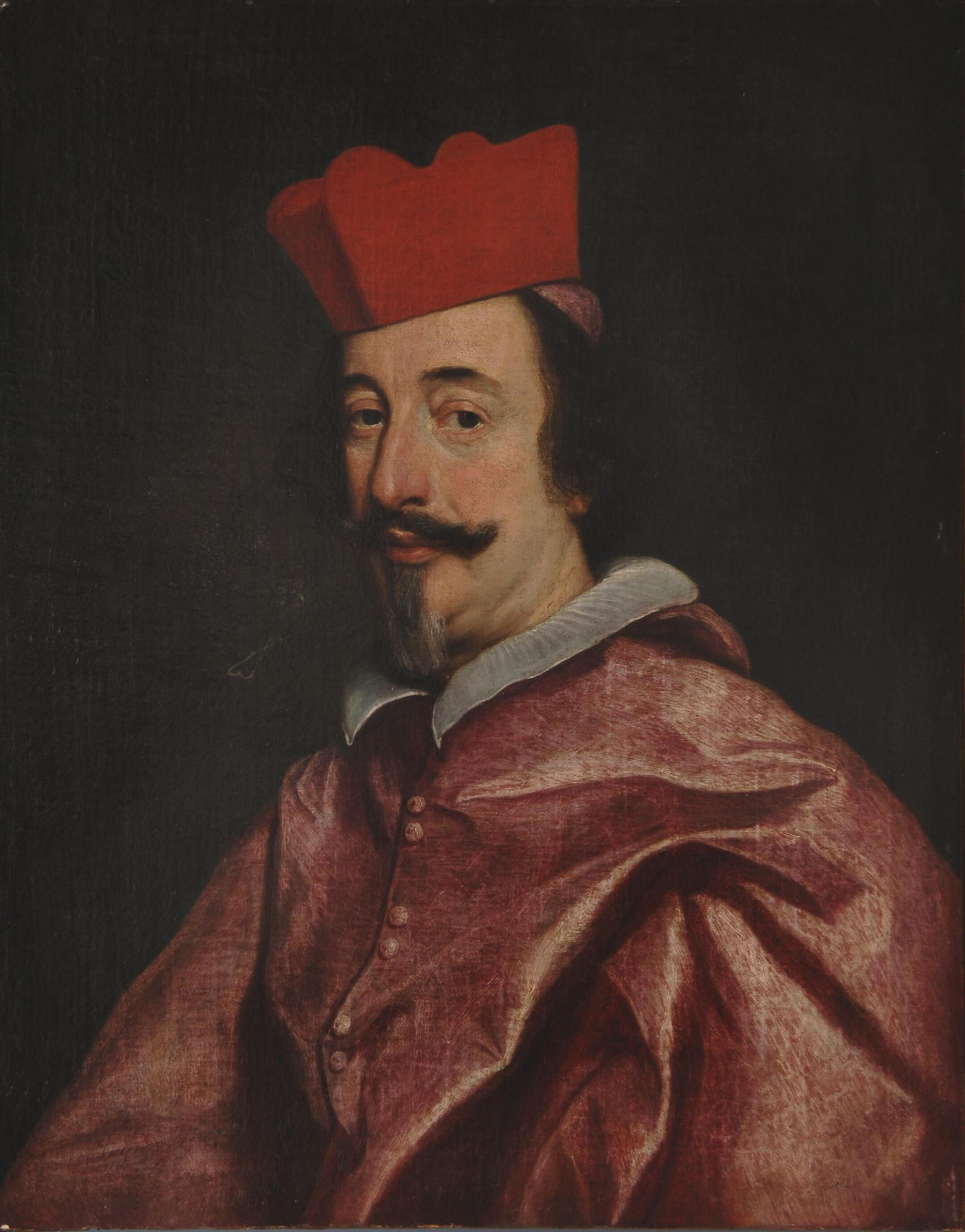
Alfonso Litta (1608-79), made a cardinal on January 14, 1664.

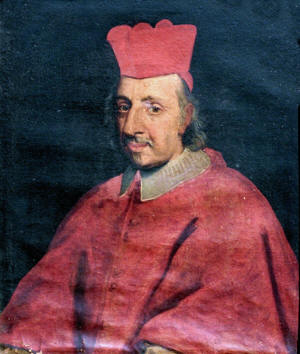
Paluzzo Paluzzi Altieri degli Albertoni (1623-98), made a cardinal on January 14, 1664.

1. Girolamo Boncompagni, archbishop of Bologna – cardinal-priest of SS. Marcellino e Pietro (received the title on 11 February 1664), † 24 January 1684
2. Celio Piccolomini, titular archbishop of Cesarea – cardinal-priest of S. Pietro in Montorio (received the title on 11 February 1664), † 24 May 1681
3. Carlo Bonelli, titular archbishop of Corinth – cardinal-priest of S. Anastasia (received the title on 13 April 1665), † 27 August 1676
4. Carlo Carafa della Spina, bishop of Aversa – cardinal-priest of S. Susanna (received the title on 13 April 1665), then cardinal-priest of S. Maria in Via (27 May 1675), † 19 October 1680
5. Angelo Celsi – cardinal-deacon of S. Giorgio in Velabro (received the title on 11 February 1664), then cardinal-deacon of S. Angelo in Pescheria (14 May 1668), † 6 November 1671
6. Paolo Savelli – cardinal-deacon of S. Maria della Scala (received the title on 11 February 1664), then cardinal-deacon of S. Giorgio in Velabro (14 January 1669), cardinal-deacon of S. Nicola in Carcere (14 May 1670), cardinal-deacon of S. Giorgio in Velabro (23 May 1678), cardinal-deacon of S. Maria in Cosmedin (15 November 1683), † 11 September 1685
7. Alfonso Michele Litta, archbishop of Milan (created in pectore, published on 15 February 1666) – cardinal-priest of S. Croce in Gerusalemme (received the title on 5 May 1666), † 28 August 1679
8. Neri Corsini, titular archbishop of Damietta (created in pectore, published on 15 February 1666) – cardinal-priest of SS. Nereo ed Achilleo (received the title on 15 March 1666), † 19 September 1678
9. Paluzzo Paluzzi degli Albertoni, auditor general of the Apostolic Chamber (created in pectore, published on 15 February 1666) – cardinal-priest of SS. XII Apostoli (received the title on 15 March 1666), then cardinal-priest of S. Crisogono (1 December 1681), cardinal-priest of S. Maria in Trastevere (13 November 1684), cardinal-bishop of Sabina (28 February 1689), cardinal-bishop of Palestrina (8 August 1691), cardinal-bishop of Porto e S. Rufina (27 January 1698), † 29 June 1698
10. Cesare Maria Antonio Rasponi (created in pectore, published on 15 February 1666) – cardinal-priest of S. Giovanni a Porta Latina (received the title on 15 March 1666), † 21 November 1675
11. Giannicolò Conti, prefect of Rome (created in pectore, published on 15 February 1666) – cardinal-priest of S. Maria Traspontina (received the title on 15 March 1666), then cardinal-bishop of Sabina (8 August 1691), † 20 January 1698
12. Giacomo Filippo Nini (created in pectore, published on 15 February 1666) – cardinal-priest of S.Maria della Pace (received the title on 15 March 1666),† 11 August 1680

== 15 February 1666 ==
Note: all these cardinals were created in pectore and published on 7 March 1667.

1. Carlo Roberti de' Vittori, titular archbishop of Tarso, nuncio in France – cardinal-priest of S. Maria in Aracoeli (received the title on 18 July 1667), † 14 February 1673
2. Giulio Spinola, titular archbishop of Laodicei, nuncio in Austria – cardinal-priest of SS. Silvestro e Martino (received the title on 18 July 1667), then cardinal-priest of S. Crisogono (13 November 1684), cardinal-priest of S. Maria in Trastevere (28 February 1689), cardinal-priest of S. Prassede (29 October 1689), † 11 March 1691
3. Vitaliano Visconti, titular archbishop of Efeso, nuncio in Spain – cardinal-priest of S. Agnese fuori le mura (received the title on 18 March 1669), † 7 September 1671
4. Innico Caracciolo, dean of the Apostolic Chamber – cardinal-priest of S. Clemente (received the title on 18 July 1667), †30 January 1685

== 7 March 1667 ==
1. Giovanni Delfino, patriarch of Aquileia – cardinal-priest of S. Salvatore in Lauro (received the title on 18 July 1667), then cardinal-priest of SS. Vito e Modesto (19 May 1670), † 19 July 1699
2. Guidobald von Thun, archbishop of Salzburg – cardinal-priest without the title, † 1 June 1668
3. Louis de Vendôme – cardinal-deacon of S. Maria in Portico (received the title on 18 July 1667), † 12 August 1669
4. Luis Guillermo de Moncada Aragón Luna de Peralta y de la Cerda, duke of Bivona – cardinal-deacon without the title, † 4 May 1672

== Sources ==
- Miranda, Salvador. "Consistories for the creation of Cardinals 17th Century (1605-1700): Alexander VII". The Cardinals of the Holy Roman Church. Florida International University. OCLC 53276621.
- P. Gauchat: Hierarchia Catholica, vol. IV, Münster 1935
