= Cardinals created by Innocent VI =

Catholic appointments from 1353 to 1361

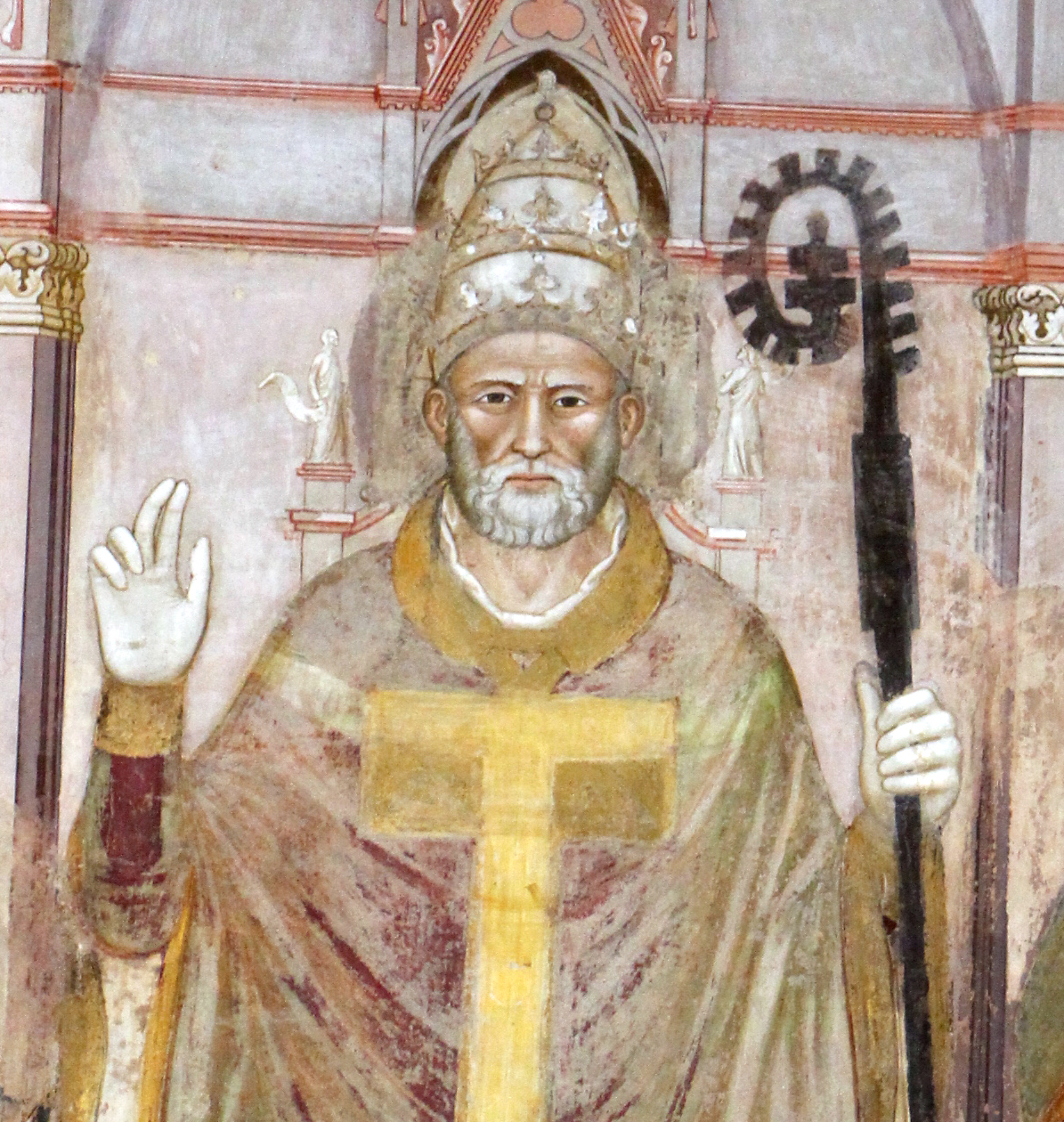
Pope Innocent VI (r. 1352–1362)

Pope Innocent VI (r. 1352–1362) created fifteen cardinals in three consistories.

== Consistory on February 15, 1353 ==
- Andouin Aubert, papal nephew, bishop of Maguelonne — cardinal-priest of SS. Giovanni e Paolo, then (July 1361) cardinal-bishop of Ostia e Velletri, + May 10, 1363.

== Consistory on December 23, 1356 ==
- Élie de Saint-Yrieix, O.S.B., bishop of Uzès — cardinal-priest of SS. IV Coronati, then (May 1363) cardinal-bishop of Ostia e Velletri, + May 10, 1367.
- Francesco degli Atti, bishop of Florence — cardinal-priest of S. Marco, + August 25, 1361.
- Pierre de Monteruc, papal nephew, bishop elect of Pamplona — cardinal-priest of S. Anastasia, + May 30, 1385.
- Guillaume Farinier, O.F.M., minister general of his order — cardinal-priest of SS. Marcellino e Pietro, + June 17, 1361.
- Nicolás Rossell, O.P., inquisitor and provincial prior of Aragón — cardinal-priest of S. Sisto, + March 28, 1362.
- Pierre de la Forêt, archbishop of Rouen — cardinal-priest of SS. XII Apostoli, + June 7, 1361.

== Consistory on September 17, 1361 ==
- Fontanier de Vassal, O.F.M., patriarch of Grado — cardinal-priest, + October 1361.
- Pierre Itier, bishop of Dax — cardinal-priest of SS. IV Coronati, then (February 4, 1364) cardinal-bishop of Albano, + May 20, 1367.
- Jean de Blauzac, bishop of Nîmes — cardinal-priest of S. Marco, then (September 1372) cardinal-bishop of Sabina, + July 6, 1379.
- Gilles Aycelin de Montaigu, bishop of Thérouanne, chancellor of France — cardinal-priest of SS. Silvestro e Martino, then (September 22, 1368) cardinal-bishop of Frascati, + December 5, 1378.
- Androin de la Roche, O.S.B., abbot of Cluny — cardinal-priest of S. Marcello, + October 29, 1369.
- Étienne Aubert, papal nephew, bishop elect of Carcassonne — cardinal-deacon of S. Maria in Aquiro, then (September 22, 1368) cardinal-priest of S. Lorenzo in Lucina, + September 29, 1369.
- Guillaume Bragose, bishop elect of Vabres — cardinal-deacon of S. Giorgio, then (December 6, 1362) cardinal-priest of S. Lorenzo in Lucina, + in autumn 1367.
- Hugues de Saint-Martial, provost of Douai — cardinal-deacon of S. Maria in Portico, + 1403.

== Bibliography ==
- Etienne Baluze: Vitae paparum avenionensium, I-II, ed. G. Mollat, 1914
- Konrad Eubel, Hierarchia Catholica, vol. I, Münster 1913
- Miranda, Salvador. "Consistories for the creation of Cardinals 14th Century (1303-1404): Innocent VI (1352-1362)". The Cardinals of the Holy Roman Church. Florida International University. OCLC 53276621.
