= Cardinals created by Honorius III =

Catholic appointments from 1216 to 1225

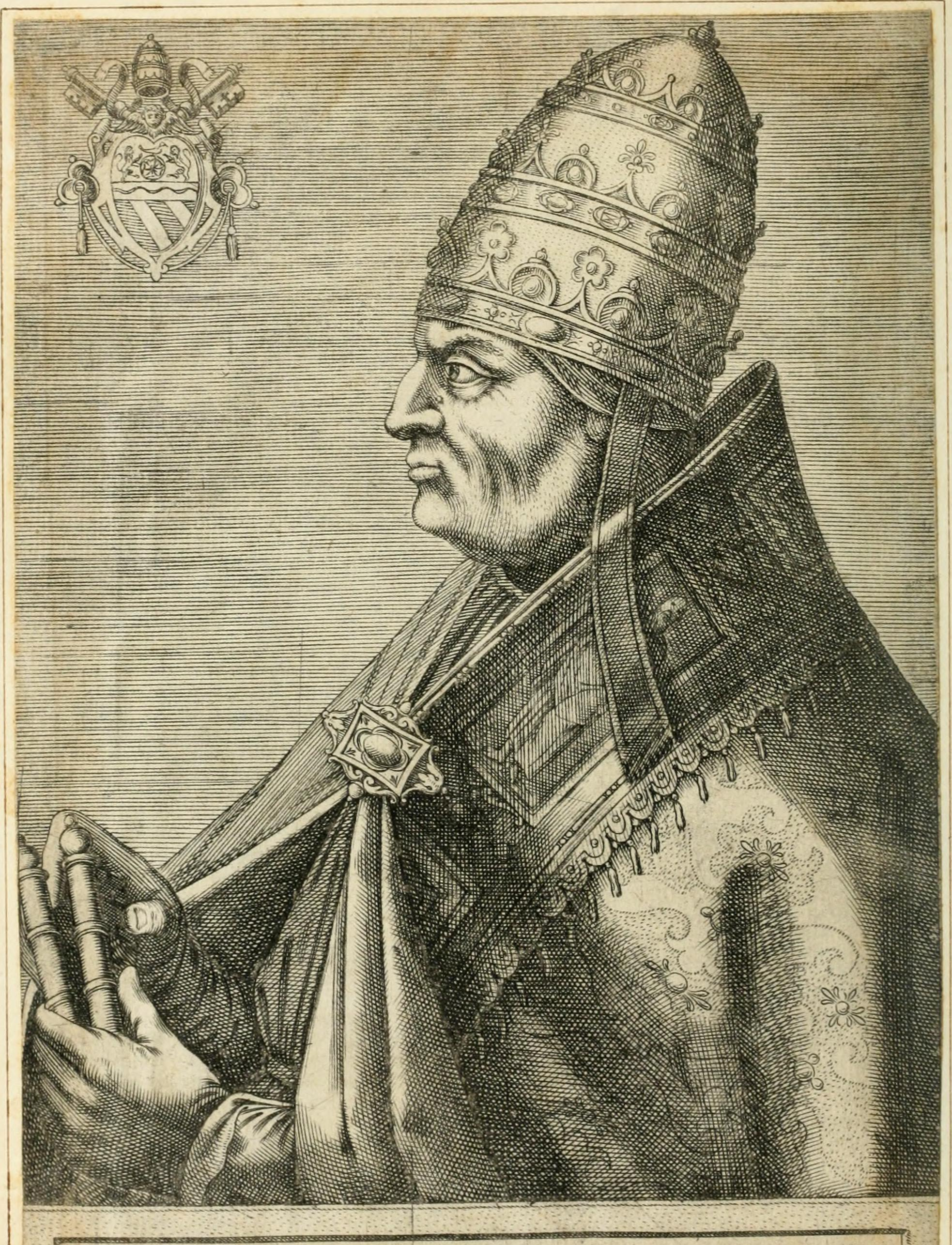
Pope Honorius III.

Pope Honorius III (r. 1216–1227) created nine cardinals in six consistories held throughout his pontificate.

== December 1216 ==
- Gil Torres
- Bertrando Savelli
- Niccolò

== 8 January 1219 ==
- Konrad von Urach O.Cist.

== October 1219 ==
The sources conflict as to when this took place with some sources suggesting it could have been celebrated in November or December with others widening it in an October to December timeframe.

- Pietro Capuano

== 1219 ==
- Niccolò de Chiaramonte O.Cist.

== 1221 ==
- Leone
- Roberto Rainaldi

== 28 September 1225 ==
- Oliver von Paderborn
