= Cardinals created by Callixtus II =

Catholic appointments from 1119 to 1123

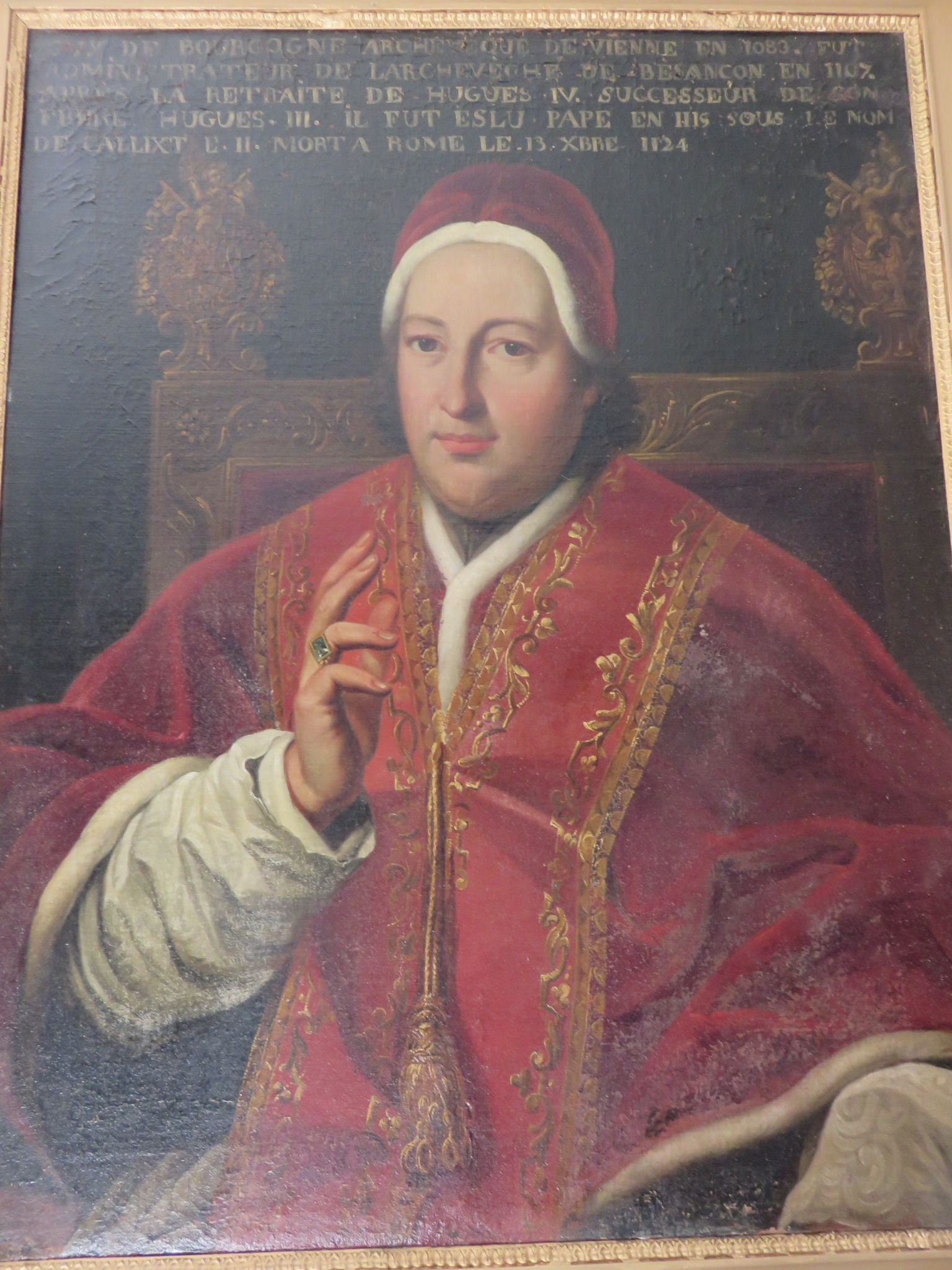
Pope Callixtus II.

Pope Callixtus II (r. 1119–24) created 35 cardinals in eight consistories held throughout his pontificate. This included one future successor (Lucius II) and two future antipopes (Celestine II and Victor IV).

== 1119 ==
- Gregorio Albergati
- Regnier

== January 1120 ==
- Pierre de Fontaines
- Roberto
- Adoaldo
- Etienne de Bar
- Pons de Melgueil O.S.B. Clun.
- Baialardo

== December 1120 ==
- Gregorio
- Aymery de la Châtre Can. Reg. Lat.
- Stefano
- Gionata iuniore
- Gerardo
- Gualtiero
- Gregorio

== 1120 ==
- Luigi Lucidi
- Atto

== December 1121 ==
- Gilles de Paris O.S.B. Clun.
- Roberto
- Pietro

== 1121 ==
- Gregorio

== December 1122 ==
- Guillaume of Palestrina
- Teobaldo Boccapecora
- Gerardo Caccianemici dell'Orso Can. Reg. S.M.R. (Note: Canon Regular of Santa Maria di Reno)
- Pietro
- Gregorio Conti
- Pietro Cariaceno
- Giovanni Dauferio
- Gregorio Tarquini
- Uberto
- Matteo
- Gregorio
- Angelo

== 1123 ==
- Johannes
- Ugo Lectifredo

== Sources ==
- Miranda, Salvador. "Consistories for the creation of Cardinals 12th Century (1099-1198): Callistus II (1119-1124)". The Cardinals of the Holy Roman Church. Florida International University. OCLC 53276621.
