= Cardinals created by Benedict XIII =

Catholic appointments from 1724 to 1730

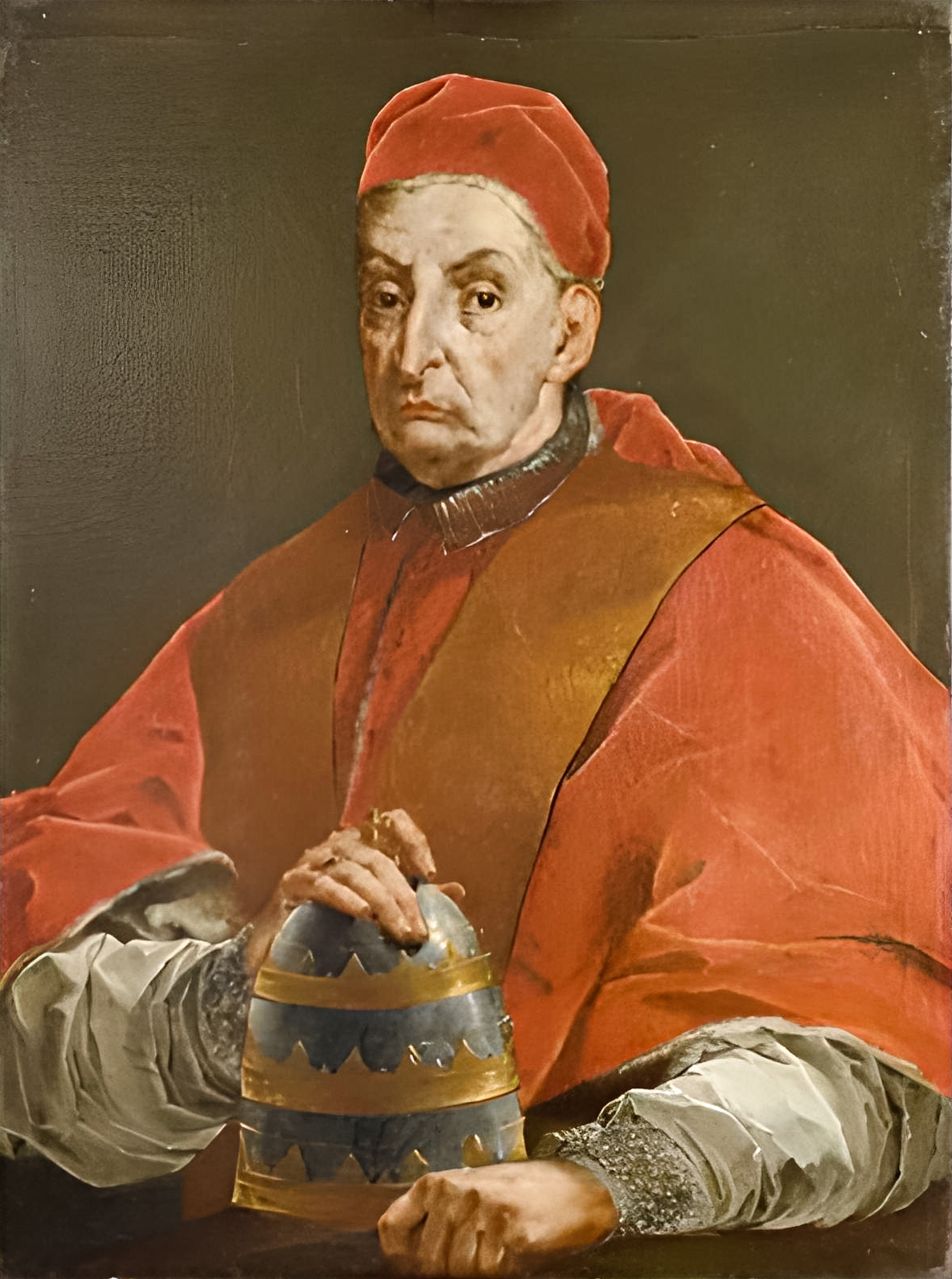
Pope Benedict XIII (1649-1730).

Pope Benedict XIII (r. 1724–1730) created 29 new cardinals in 12 consistories:

== 11 September 1724 ==
Both cardinals received their titular churches on 20 November 1724.

1. Giovanni Battista Altieri, titular archbishop of Tiro – cardinal-priest of S. Matteo in Merulana, then cardinal-bishop of Palestrina (26 January 1739), † 12 March 1740
2. Alessandro Falconieri, vice-camerlengo of the Holy Roman Church and governor of Rome – cardinal-deacon of S. Maria della Scala, † 26 January 1734

== 20 November 1724 ==
1. Vincenzo Petra, titular archbishop of Damasco, secretary of the S. C. of Bishops and Regulars – cardinal-priest of S. Onofrio (received the title on 20 December 1724), then cardinal-priest of S. Pietro in Vincoli (11 February 1737), cardinal-bishop of Palestrina (16 September 1740), † 21 March 1747

== 20 December 1724 ==
Both cardinals received their titular churches on 29 January 1725.

1. Prospero Marefoschi, titular archbishop of Cesarea – cardinal-priest of S. Crisogono, then cardinal-priest of S. Callisto (19 November 1725), cardinal-priest of S. Silvestro in Capite (20 September 1728), † 24 February 1732
2. Agostino Pipia, O.P., master general of the Order of Preachers, bishop-elect of Osimo – cardinal-priest of S. Sisto, then cardinal-priest of S. Maria sopra Minerva (3 March 1729), † 19 February 1730

== 11 June 1725 ==
Both cardinals received their titular churches on 23 July 1725.

1. Niccolò Coscia, titular archbishop of Traianopolis – cardinal-priest of S. Maria in Domnica, † 8 February 1755
2. Niccolò del Giudice – cardinal-deacon of S. Maria ad Martyres, † 30 January 1743

== 11 September 1726 ==
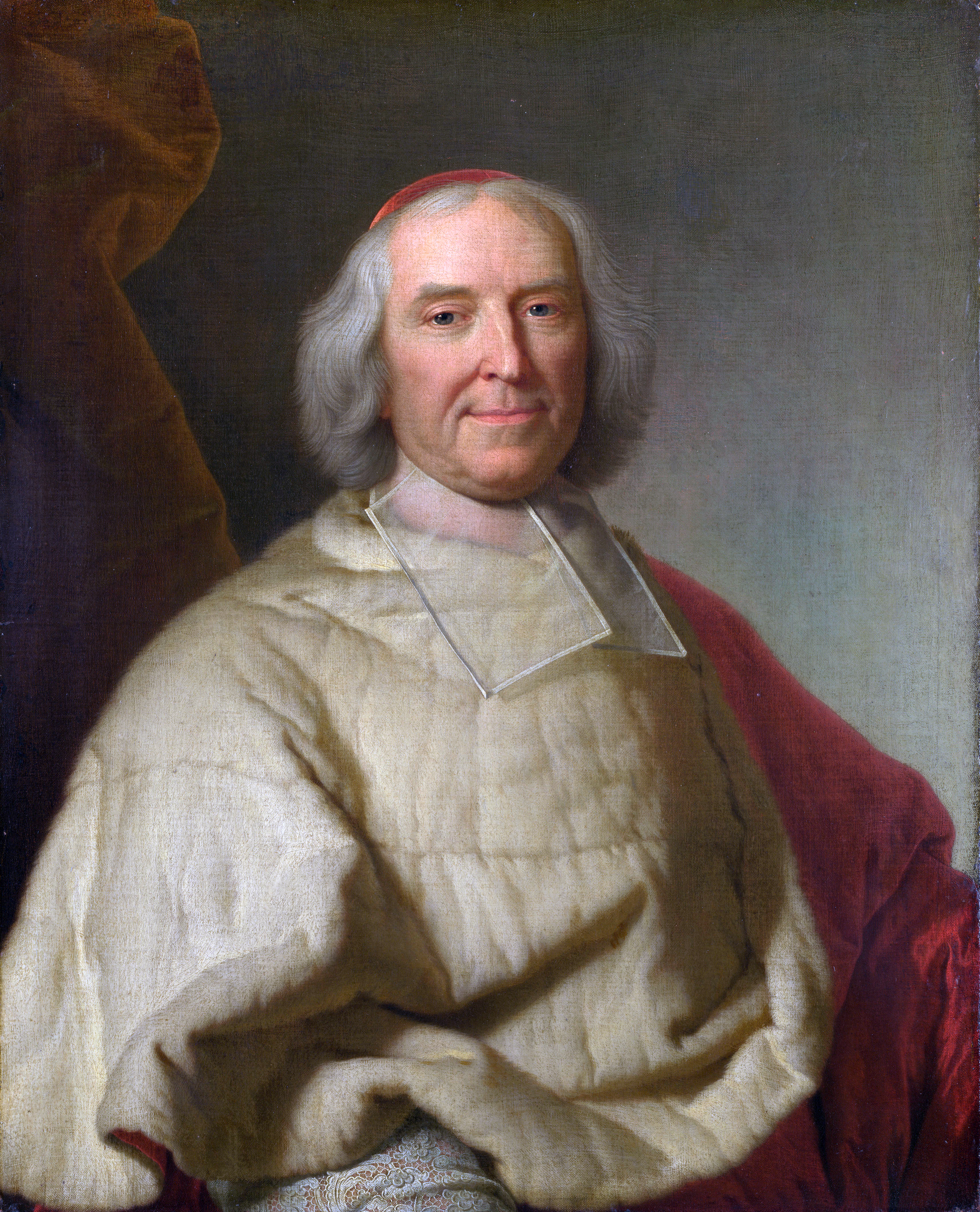
André-Hercule de Fleury (1653-1743), made a cardinal on September 11, 1726.

1. André-Hercule de Fleury – cardinal-priest without the title, † 29 January 1743

== 9 December 1726 ==
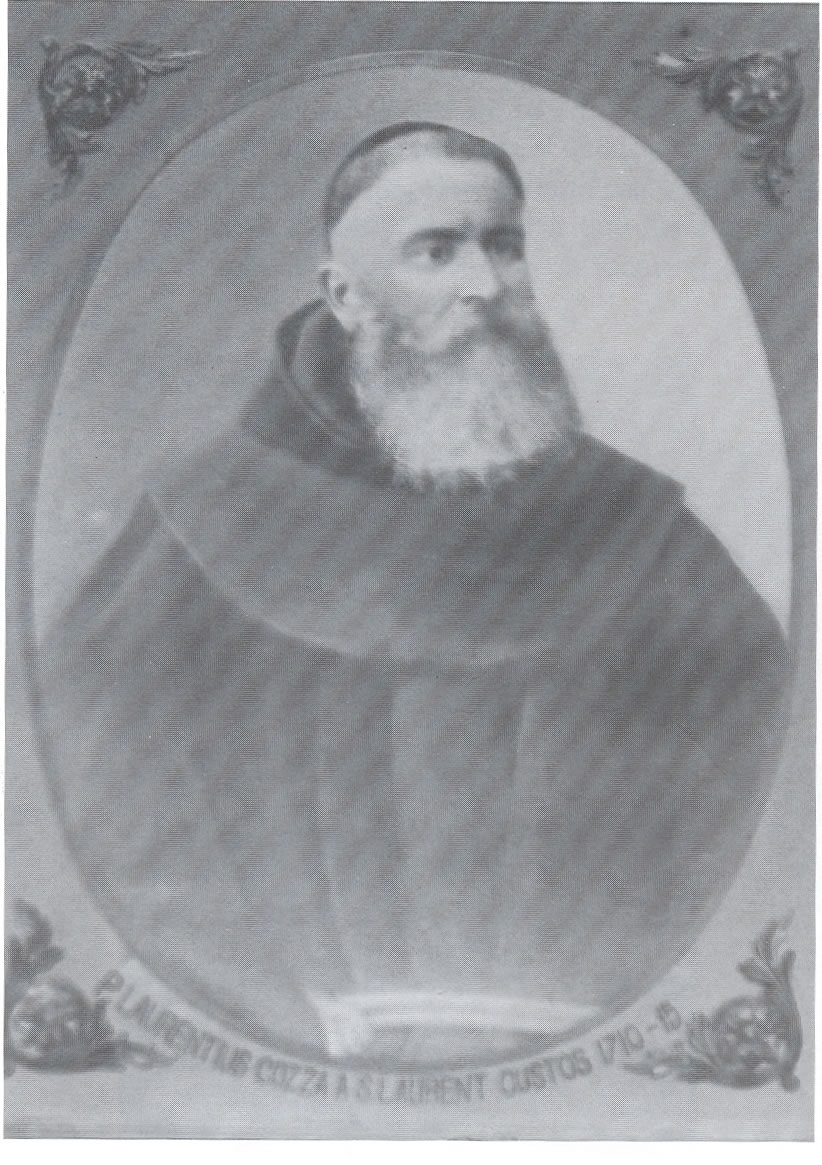
Lorenzo Cozza (1654-1729), made a cardinal on December 9, 1726.

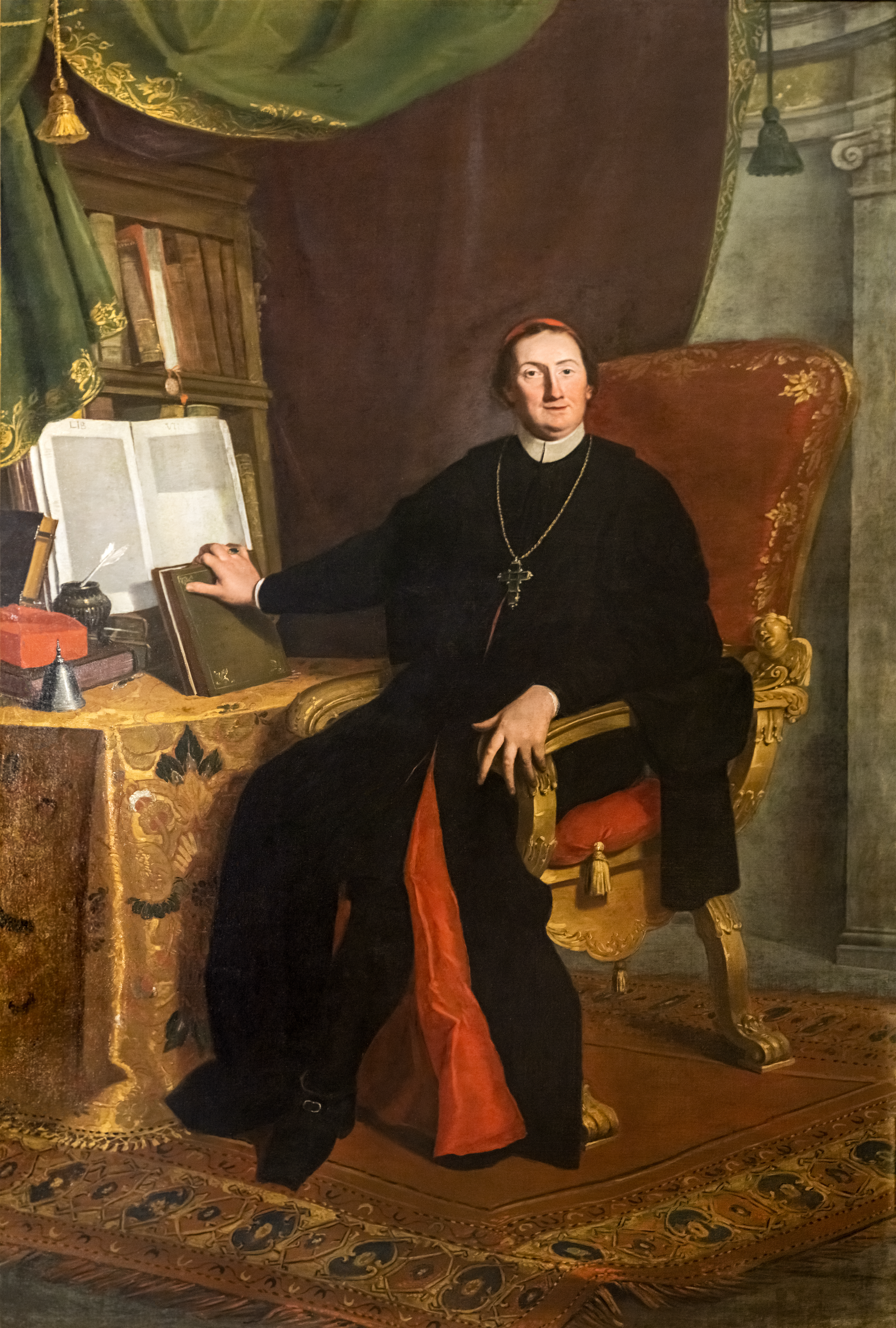
Angelo Maria Quirini (1680-1755), made a cardinal on December 9, 1726.

1. Niccolò Maria Lercari, titular archbishop of Nazianzo, Secretary of State – cardinal-priest of SS. Giovanni e Paolo (received the title on 16 December 1726), then cardinal-priest of S. Pietro in Vincoli (11 March 1743), † 21 March 1757
2. Lorenzo Cozza, O.F.M. Obs., master general of his order – cardinal-priest of S. Lorenzo in Panisperna (received the title on 16 December 1726), then cardinal-priest of S. Maria in Aracoeli (20 January 1727), † 19 January 1729
3. Angelo Maria Quirini, O.S.B.Cas., archbishop of Brescia (created in pectore, published on 26 November 1727) – cardinal-priest of S. Agostino (received the title on 22 December 1727), then cardinal-priest of S. Marco (8 March 1728), cardinal-priest of S. Prassede (11 March 1743), † 6 January 1755
4. Francesco Antonio Finy, titular archbishop of Damasco (created in pectore, published on 26 January 1728) – cardinal-priest of S. Maria in Via (received the title on 8 March 1728), then cardinal-priest of S. Sisto (6 July 1729), cardinal-priest of S. Maria in Trastevere (3 September 1738), cardinal-priest of S. Pietro in Vincoli (16 September 1740), cardinal-priest of S. Maria in Trastevere (11 March 1743), † 5 April 1743
5. Marco Antonio Ansidei, titular archbishop of Damietta (created in pectore, published on 30 April 1728) – cardinal-priest of S. Pietro in Montorio (received the title on 10 May 1728), then cardinal-priest of S. Agostino (3 August 1729), † 14 February 1730
6. Prospero Lambertini, bishop of Ancona (created in pectore, published on 30 April 1728) – cardinal-priest of S. Croce in Gerusalemme (received the title on 10 May 1728); from 17 August 1740 was Pope Benedict XIV, † 3 May 1758
7. Gregorio Selleri, O.P., Master of the Sacred Palace (created in pectore, published on 30 April 1728) – cardinal-priest of S. Agostino (received the title on 10 May 1729), † 31 May 1729
8. Antonio Banchieri, vice-camerlengo of the Holy Roman Church and governor of Rome (created in pectore, published on 30 April 1728) – cardinal-deacon of S. Nicola in Carcere (received the title on 10 May 1728), † 16 September 1733
9. Carlo Collicola, treasurer general of the Apostolic Chamber (created in pectore, published on 30 April 1728) – cardinal-deacon of S. Maria in Portico (received the title on 10 May 1728), † 20 October 1730

== 26 November 1727 ==
1. Diego de Astorga y Céspedes, archbishop of Toledo – cardinal-priest without the title, † 8 February 1743
2. Sigismund von Kollonitz, archbishop of Vienna – cardinal-priest of SS. Marcellino e Pietro (received the title on 14 August 1730), then cardinal-priest of S. Crisogono (29 August 1740), † 12 April 1751
3. Philipp Ludwig von Sinzendorf, bishop of Györ – cardinal-priest of S. Maria sopra Minerva (14 August 1730), † 28 September 1747
4. João da Mota e Silva – cardinal-priest without the title, † 4 October 1747

== 30 April 1728 ==
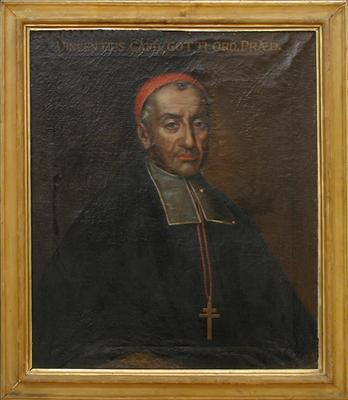
Vincenzo Ludovico Gotti (1664-1742), made a cardinal on April 30, 1728.

1. Vincenzo Ludovico Gotti, O.P., titular patriarch of Jerusalem – cardinal-priest of S. Pancrazio (received the title on 14 June 1728), then cardinal-priest of S. Sisto (26 September 1738), † 18 September 1742
2. Leandro Porzia, O.S.B., bishop-elect of Brescia – cardinal-priest of S. Girolamo degli Schiavoni (received the title on 10 May 1728), then cardinal-priest of S. Callisto (20 September 1728), † 10 June 1740

== 20 September 1728 ==
Both cardinals received their titular churches on 15 November 1728.

1. Pierluigi Carafa, titular archbishop of Larissa, secretary of the S. C. of Bishops and Regulars – cardinal-priest of S. Lorenzo in Panisperna, then cardinal-priest of S. Prisca (16 December 1737), cardinal-bishop of Albano (16 September 1740), cardinal-bishop of Porto e S. Rufina (15 November 1751), cardinal-bishop of Ostia e Velletri (9 April 1753), † 15 December 1755
2. Giuseppe Accoramboni, bishop of Imola – cardinal-priest of S. Maria Traspontina, then cardinal-priest of S. Maria in Trastevere (16 September 1740), cardinal-bishop of Frascati (11 March 1743), † 21 March 1747

== 23 March 1729 ==
1. Camillo Cibo, titular patriarch of Constantinople – cardinal-priest of S. Stefano al Monte Celio (received the title on 28 March 1729), cardinal-priest of S. Maria del Popolo (8 January 1731), cardinal-priest of S. Maria degli Angeli (20 December 1741), † 12 January 1743

== 6 July 1729 ==
1. Francesco Scipione Maria Borghese, titular archbishop of Traianopolis – cardinal-priest of S. Pietro in Montorio (received the title on 3 August 1729), then cardinal-priest of S. Silvestro in Capite (31 March 1732), cardinal-priest of S. Maria in Trastevere (20 May 1743), cardinal-bishop of Albano (25 September 1752), cardinal-bishop of Porto e S. Rufina (12 February 1759), † 21 June 1759
2. Carlo Vincenzo Maria Ferreri Thaon, O.P., bishop of Alessandria – cardinal-priest of S. Maria in Via (received the title on 23 December 1729), † 9 December 1742

== 8 February 1730 ==
1. Alamanno Salviati – cardinal-priest of S. Maria in Aracoeli (received the title on 24 July 1730), † 24 February 1733

== Sources ==
- Miranda, Salvador. "Consistories for the creation of Cardinals 18th Century (1700-1799): Benedict XIII". The Cardinals of the Holy Roman Church. Florida International University. OCLC 53276621.
- R. Ritzler: Hierarchia Catholica, vol. V, Münster 1952
