= Cardinals created by Clement VI =

Catholic appointments from 1342 to 1350

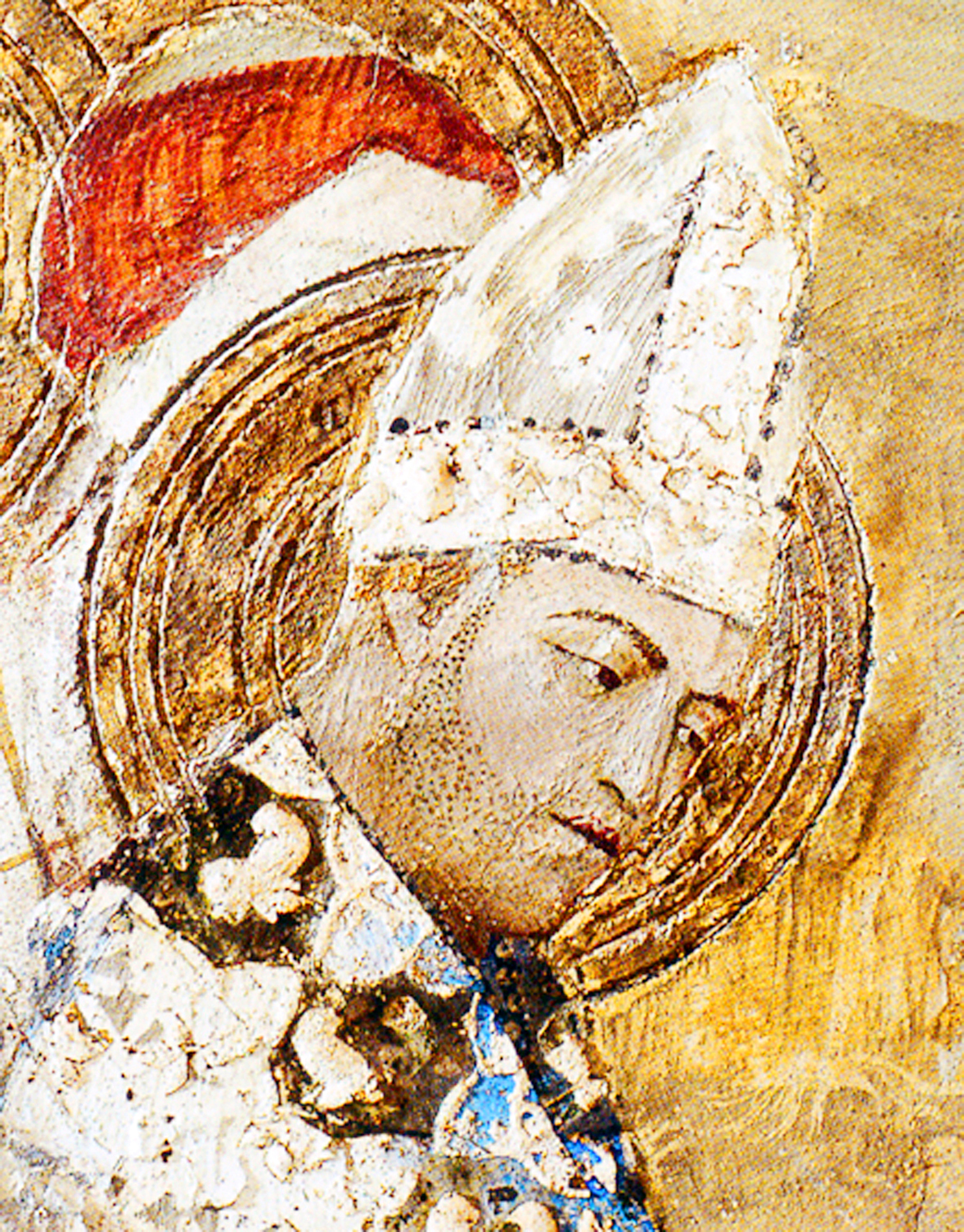
Pope Clement VI (r. 1342–1352)

Pope Clement VI (r. 1342–1352) created 25 new cardinals in four consistories:

== 20 September 1342 ==
1. Élie de Nabinal, O.F.M., patriarch of Jerusalem – cardinal-priest of S. Vitale, † 13 January 1348
2. Guy de Boulogne, archbishop of Lyon – cardinal-priest of S. Cecilia, then (18 December 1350) cardinal-bishop of Porto e Santa Rufina, † 25 November 1373
3. Aymeric de Chalus, bishop of Chartres – cardinal-priest of SS. Martino e Silvestro, † 31 October 1349
4. Andrea Ghini Malpighi, bishop of Tournai – cardinal-priest of S. Susanna, † 2 June 1343
5. Étienne Aubert, bishop of Clermont – cardinal-priest of SS. Giovanni e Paolo, then cardinal-bishop of Ostia e Velletri (13 February 1352); became Pope Innocent VI on 18 December 1352, † 12 September 1362
6. Hugues Roger, O.S.B., brother of the Pope, elect of Tulle – cardinal-priest of S. Lorenzo in Damaso, † 21 October 1363
7. Adhémar Robert, cousin of the Pope – cardinal-priest of S. Anastasia, † 1 December 1352
8. Gérard de la Garde, O.P., cousin of the Pope, master general of the Order of Preachers – cardinal-priest of S. Sabina, † 27 September 1343
9. Pierre Cyriac, cardinal-priest of San Crisogono (died 1351)
10. Bernard de la Tour, nephew of the Pope – cardinal-deacon of S. Eustachio, † 7 August 1361
11. Guillaume de la Jugié, nephew of the Pope – cardinal-deacon of Maria in Cosmedin (received the title on 12 October 1342), then (22 September 1368) cardinal-priest of S. Clemente, † 28 April 1374

== 27 February 1344 ==
1. Pierre Bertrand, bishop of Arras – cardinal-priest of S. Susanna (the title on 19 May 1344), then (1353) cardinal-bishop of Ostia e Velletri, † 13 July 1361
2. Nicolas de Besse, nephew of the Pope, bishop of Limoges – cardinal-deacon of S. Maria in Via Lata (received the title on 1 June 1344), † 5 November 1369

== 28 May 1348 ==
1. Pierre Roger de Beaufort, nephew of the Pope – cardinal-deacon of S. Maria Nuova (received the title on 5 June 1348), became Pope Gregory XI on 30 December 1370, † 27 March 1378

== 17 December 1350 ==
1. Gil Álvarez de Albornoz, C.R.S.A., archbishop of Toledo – cardinal-priest of S. Clemente, then (December 1355) cardinal-bishop of Sabina, † 23 August 1367
2. Pasteur de Sarrats, O.F.M., archbishop of Embrun – cardinal-priest of SS. Marcellino e Pietro, † 11 October 1356
3. Raymond de Canillac, C.R.S.A., nephew of the Pope, archbishop of Toulouse – cardinal-priest of S. Croce in Gerusalemme, then (4 November 1361) cardinal-bishop of Palestrna, † 20 June 1373
4. Guillaume d'Aigrefeuille, cousin of the Pope, archbishop of Zaragoza – cardinal-priest of S. Maria in Trastevere, then (17 September 1367) cardinal-bishop of Sabiny, † 4 October 1369
5. Nicola Capocci, bishop of Seo de Urgell – cardinal-priest of S. Vitale (received the title on 3 February 1351), then (1361) cardinal-bishop of Tusculum, † 26 July 1368
6. Pectin de Montesquieu, bishop of Albi – cardinal-priest of SS. XII Apostoli (received the title on 3 February 1351), † 1 February 1355
7. Arnaud de Villemur, C.R.S.A., bishop of Pamiers – cardinal-priest of S. Sisto (received the title on 3 February 1351), † 28 October 1355
8. Pierre de Cros, relative of the Pope, bishop of Auxerre – cardinal-priest of SS. Silvestro e Martino (received the title on 3 February 1351), † 23 September 1361
9. Gilles Rigaud, O.S.B. – cardinal-priest of S. Prassede (received the title on 3 February 1351), † 10 September 1353
10. Jean de Moulins, O.P. master general of the Order of Preachers – cardinal-priest of S. Sabina (received the title on 3 February 1351), † 23 February 1353
11. Rinaldo Orsini – cardinal-deacon of S. Adriano, † 6 June 1374
12. Jean de Caraman – cardinal-deacon of S. Giorgio in Velabro, † 1 August 1361

== Additional notes ==
According to later authors, such as Alphonsus Ciacconius, Clement VI promoted also the following cardinals:

- Pierre Cyriac, bishop of Arras
- Matthäus an der Gassen, bishop of Brixen
- Étienne de la Garde, archbishop of Arles
- Dominic Serra, O. de M., master general of the Order of Mercedarians

Contemporary Vitae Clementis VI do not mention their promotions and explicitly say that Clement VI created only 25 cardinals. Konrad Eubel concluded that they should be eliminated from the list of cardinals. Pierre Cyriac did not exist at all and is confused with Pierre Bertrand, who actually was bishop of Arras and became cardinal in 1344, while the remaining three are genuine persons but they never became cardinals.

== Sources ==
- Konrad Eubel: Hierarchia Catholica, I, 1913, p. 18-19
- Etienne Blauze: Vitae paparum avenionensium, I-II, ed. G. Mollat, Paris 1916-1927
- Miranda, Salvador. "Consistories for the creation of Cardinals 14th Century (1303-1404): Clement VI (1342-1352)". The Cardinals of the Holy Roman Church. Florida International University. OCLC 53276621.
