= Cardinals created by Paul IV =

Catholic appointments from 1555 to 1557

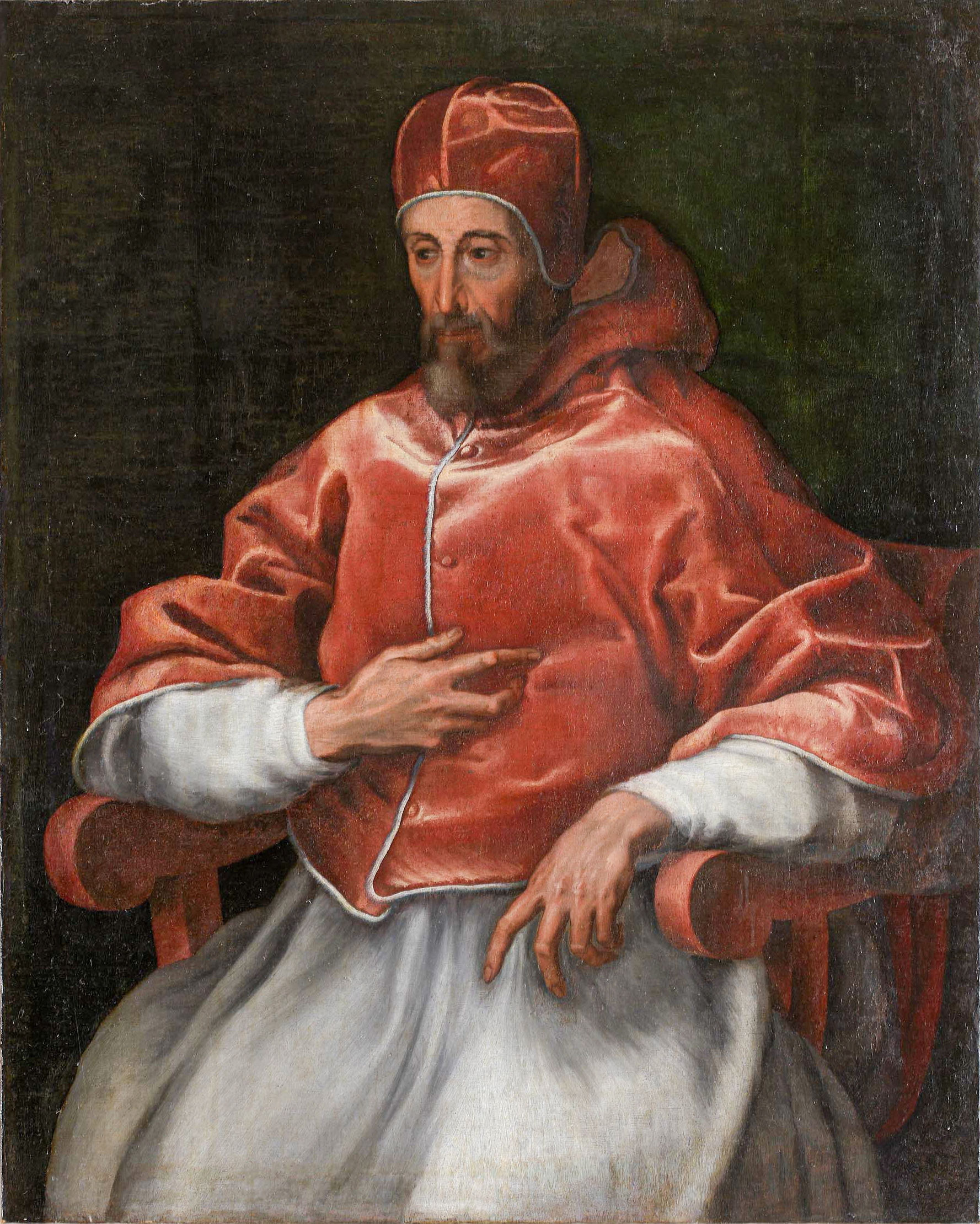
Pope Paul IV (1476–1559).

Pope Paul IV (r. 1555–1559) created 19 cardinals in four consistories.

== 7 June 1555 ==
1. Carlo Carafa

== 20 December 1555 ==
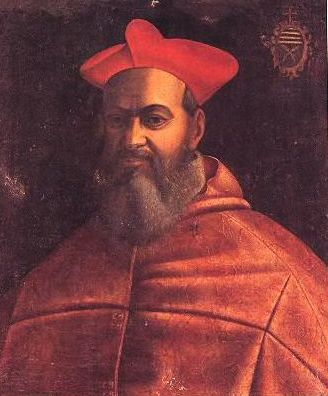
Scipione Rebiba (1504–77), made a cardinal on December 20, 1555.

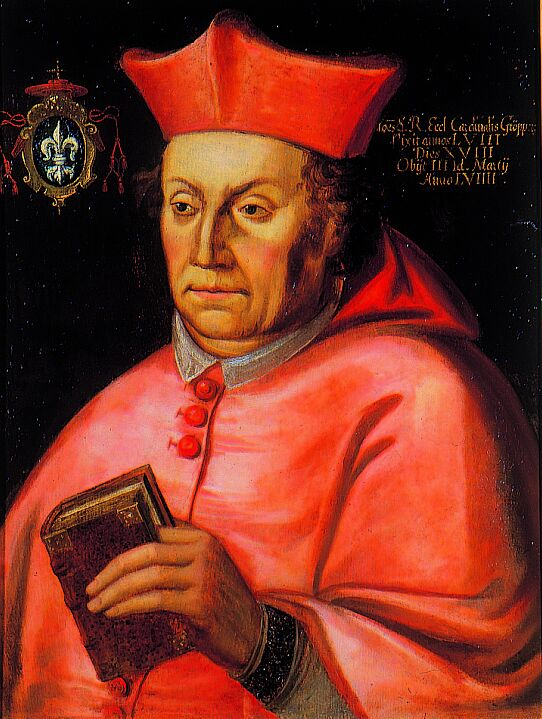
Johann Gropper (1503–59), made a cardinal on December 20, 1555.

1. Juan Martínez Silíceo
2. Gianbernardino Scotti
3. Diomede Carafa
4. Scipione Rebiba
5. Jean Suau
6. Johann Gropper
7. Gianantonio Capizucchi

== 15 March 1557 ==
1. Taddeo Gaddi
2. Antonio Trivulzio, iuniore
3. Lorenzo Strozzi
4. Virgilio Rosario
5. Jean Bertrand
6. Michele Ghislieri
7. Clemente d'Olera
8. Alfonso Carafa
9. Vitellozzo Vitelli
10. Giovanni Battista Consiglieri

== 14 June 1557 ==
1. William Petow
