= Cardinals created by Paul II =

Catholic appointments from 1467 to 1468

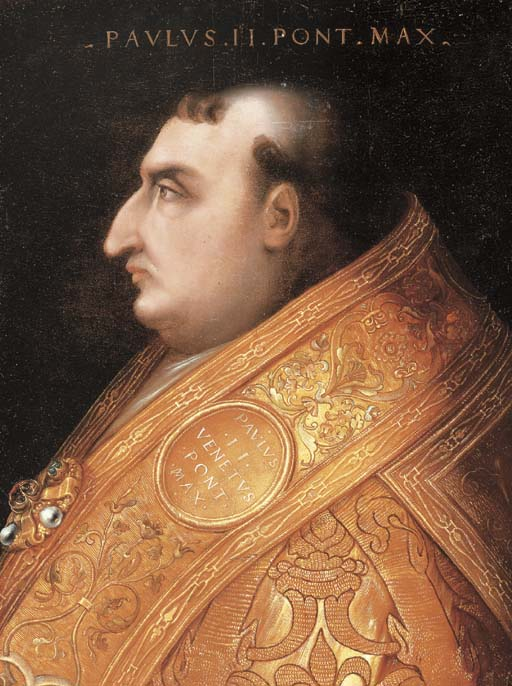
Pope Paul II (r. 1464–1471)

Pope Paul II (r. 1464–1471) created ten cardinals in two consistories.

== 18 September 1467 ==
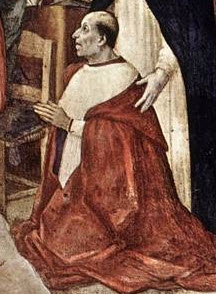
Oliviero Carafa (1430-1511), made a cardinal on September 18, 1467.

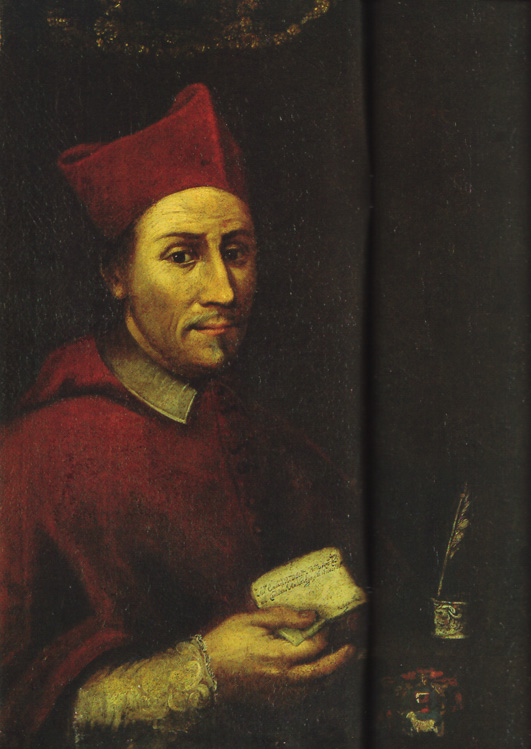
Amico Agnifili (d. 1478), made a cardinal on September 18, 1467.

- Thomas Bourchier, archbishop of Canterbury — cardinal-priest of S. Ciriaco (received the title on 13 May 1468), † 22 March 1486
- Stephen Várdai, archbishop of Kalocsa-Bács, Hungary — cardinal-priest of SS. Nereo ed Achileo (received the title on 13 May 1468), † in February 1471
- Oliviero Carafa, archbishop of Naples — cardinal-priest of SS. Marcellino e Pietro (received the title on 3 December 1467), then cardinal-priest of S. Eusebio (5 September 1470), cardinal-bishop of Albano (24 July 1476), cardinal-bishop of Sabina (31 January 1483), cardinal-bishop of Ostia e Velletri (29 November 1503), † 20 January 1511
- Amico Agnifili, bishop of Aquila — cardinal-priest of S. Balbina (received the title on 13 November 1467), then cardinal-priest of S. Maria in Trastevere (13 October 1469), † 9 November 1476
- Marco Barbo (1420-1491), cousin of the pope, bishop of Vicenza — cardinal-priest of S. Marco (received the title on 2 October 1467), then cardinal-bishop of Palestrina (6 November 1478), † 11 March 1491
- Jean Balue, bishop of Angers, France — cardinal-priest of S. Susanna (received the title on 13 May 1468), then cardinal-bishop of Albano (31 January 1483), cardinal-bishop of Palestrina (14 March 1491), † 5 October 1491
- Francesco della Rovere, O.F.M.Conv., minister general of his Order — cardinal-priest of S. Pietro in Vincoli (received the title on 20 November 1467); became Pope Sixtus IV on 9 August 1471, † 12 August 1484
- Teodoro Paleologo di Montferrato, protonotary apostolic — cardinal-deacon of S. Teodoro (received the title on 27 April 1468), † 21 January 1484

== 21 November 1468 ==
- Giovanni Battista Zeno, nephew of the pope, protonotary apostolic — cardinal-deacon of S. Maria in Portico (received the title on 22 November 1468), then cardinal-priest of S. Anastasia (after 1 January 1472), cardinal-bishop of Tusculum (8 October 1479), † 7 May 1501
- Giovanni Michiel, nephew of the pope, protonotary apostolic — cardinal-deacon of S. Lucia in Septisolio (received the title on 22 November 1468), then cardinal-deacon of S. Angelo in Pescheria (before 15 May 1470), cardinal-priest of S. Marcello (1476), cardinal-bishop of Albano (14 March 1491), cardinal-bishop of Palestrina (10 October 1491), cardinal-bishop of Porto e S. Rufina (26 August 1492), † 10 April 1503
