= List of cardinals created between 904–985 =

List of the cardinals attested in the contemporary sources during the period of pornocracy (904–964) and later until the election of Pope John XV in August 985. It certainly contains only small part of all cardinals living at that time, because only a small number of documents and other accounts useful for the reconstruction of that list have been preserved to our times.

The dates in the parentheses mark the first and last time when the cardinal appears in the sources.

== Cardinal-bishops ==
- Hildebrandus – cardinal-bishop of Silva Candida (23 May 905)
- Leo – cardinal-bishop of Palestrina (925 – 2 February 933)
- Benedictus – cardinal-bishop of Silva Candida (29 May 939 – 4 February 943)
- Leo – cardinal-bishop of Velletri (9 January 946 – November 963)
- Constantinus – cardinal-bishop of Porto (May 958)
- Sico – cardinal-bishop of Ostia (November 963 – excommunicated on 28 February 964)
- Benedictus – cardinal-bishop of Porto (November 963 – 26 May 969)
- Lunisso – cardinal-bishop of Labico (November 963 – 2 January 968)
- Gregorius – cardinal-bishop of Albano (November 963 – April 983)
- Teophylactus – cardinal-bishop of Palestrina (November 963)
- Wido – cardinal-bishop of Silva Candida (November 963 – 29 December 975)
- Leo – cardinal-bishop of Ostia (2 January 968 – April 983)

Note: diocese of Sabina became a suburbicarian see only in 1063. Although some of its bishops in the 10th century are known by name, they should not be included in the list of cardinals.

== Cardinal-priests ==
- Leo – cardinal-priest of S. Susanna, later Pope Leo VI (June 928 – December 928)
- Stephanus – cardinal-priest of S. Anastasia, later Pope Stephen VII (December 928 – February 931)
- Johannes – cardinal-priest of S. Maria in Trastevere, later Pope John XI (March 931 – January 936)
- Leo – cardinal-priest of S. Sisto, later Pope Leo VII (3 January 936 – 13 July 939)
- Stephanus – cardinal-priest of SS. Silvestro e Martino, later Pope Stephen VIII (14 July 939 – October 942)
- Marinus – cardinal-priest of S. Ciriaco, later Pope Marinus II (30 October 942 – May 946)
- Stephanus – cardinal-priest of SS. Nereo ed Achilleo (November 963 – February 964)
- Leo – cardinal-priest of S. Balbina (November 963 – February 964)
- Dominicus – cardinal-priest of S. Anastasia (November 963 – 26 May 969)
- Petrus – cardinal-priest of S. Lorenzo in Damaso (November 963 – February 964)
- Theophylactus – cardinal-priest of S. Crisogono (November 963 – February 964)
- Joannes – cardinal-priest of S. Susanna (November 963 – February 964)
- Petrus – cardinal-priest of SS. Giovanni e Paolo (November 963)
- Hadrianus – cardinal-priest of S. Maria in Trastevere (November 963)
- Joannes – cardinal-priest of S. Cecilia (November 963 – February 964)
- Hadrianus – cardinal-priest of S. Lorenzo in Lucina (November 963 – February 964)
- Benedictus – cardinal-priest of S. Sisto (November 963 – 25 December 968)
- Theophylactus – cardinal-priest of SS. IV Coronati (November 963 – February 964)
- Stephanus – cardinal-priest of S. Sabina (November 963 – February 964)
- Joannes – cardinal-priest of SS. Silvestro e Martino (February 964)
- Crescentius – cardinal-priest (26 May 969)
- Theophylactus – cardinal-priest (26 May 969)
- Joannes – cardinal-priest of S. Vitale, later Pope John XV (August 985 – March 996)

== Cardinal-deacons ==
- Octavianus – cardinal-deacon of S. Maria in Domnica, later Pope John XII (16 December 955 – 14 May 964)
- Joannes – cardinal-deacon of the Holy Roman Church (960 – November 963)
- Joannes – cardinal-deacon of the Holy Roman Church, later bishop of Narni (8 August 961 – 1 October 965) and Pope John XIII (1 October 965 – 6 September 972)
- Benedictus – cardinal-deacon and archdeacon of the Holy Roman Church (November 963 – 26 May 969)
- Bonofilius – cardinal-deacon of the Holy Roman Church (November 963 – February 964)
- Benedictus Grammaticus – cardinal-deacon of the Holy Roman Church (February 964 – 22 May 964), later Pope Benedict V (22 May 964 – 23 June 964, d. 4 July 966)
- Leo – cardinal-deacon of the Holy Roman Church (26 May 969)
- Bonifatius – cardinal-deacon of the Holy Roman Church (26 May 969)
- Benedictus – cardinal-deacon of S. Teodoro, later Pope Benedict VI (19 January 973 – June 974)
- Bonifatius Franco – cardinal-deacon of the Holy Roman Church, later Antipope Boniface VII (June 974 – 20 July 985)
- Stephanus – cardinal-deacon of the Holy Roman Church (975)
- Joannes – cardinal-deacon and archdeacon of the Holy Roman Church (7 March 982)
- Joannes – cardinal-deacon of the Holy Roman Church (April 983)

== "Presumed cardinals" ==
Numerous writers from the 16th century onwards, including Alphonsus Ciacconius (1540–1599), Lorenzo Cardella etc. have mentioned several other cardinals ostensibly created during this period, which, however, for various reasons should be either eliminated from that list or classified as dubious ("presumed cardinals"). They can be divided in four subsequent categories.

=== Authentic persons, whose cardinalate is not proven ===
Note: in some cases it is possible that the promotion really took place; however, there is no evidence to ascertain it:

| Name | Alleged cardinalate | Notes |
|---|---|---|
| Johannes | Cardinal-deacon ca. 907, elected Pope John X (914–928) | Pope John X was a deacon, but in Bologna and not at Rome; from 905 he was archbishop of Ravenna. |
| Anastasius | Cardinal-deacon created by Sergius III (904–911), elected Pope Anastasius III (911–913) | Contemporary sources say nothing about his promotion to the cardinalate |
| Lando | Cardinal-deacon created by Sergius III (904–911), elected Pope Lando (913–914) | Contemporary sources do not mention his cardinalate |
| Christophorus | Cardinal-deacon and primicerius created by Sergius III (904–911); relative of Pope Leo V | Statement almost certainly resulted from a confusion. Primicerius Christophorus was father of Pope Leo VI (not Leo V) and is attested in several documents issued by Pope John VIII in 876; there is no evidence that he was later promoted to the cardinalate and even that he was still alive under Pope Sergius III |
| Sergius | Cardinal-deacon created by John X in 928 | Certain Sergius was one of the legates of John XI in Constantinople in 932-933 but there is no evidence that he was a cardinal |
| Agapitus | Cardinal-deacon created by Marinus II (942–946), elected Pope Agapitus II (946–955) | The Sigeric's catalogue does not list him as cardinal. Other contemporary sources also do not mention his cardinalate |
| Benedictus | Bishop of Sutri and cardinal under Pope John XIII (965–972), elected Pope Benedict VII (974–983) | He was bishop of Sutri, but neither the Sigeric's catalogue nor the other contemporary accounts make any reference to his cardinalate |
| Petrus | Bishop of Pavia and cardinal created before 981, elected Pope John XIV (983–984) | He was bishop of Pavia from at least 972, but neither the Sigeric's catalogue nor the other contemporary accounts make any reference to his cardinalate |
| Hadamar, O.S.B., abbot of Fulda (927–956) | Cardinal-priest created in 946 | There exist numerous papal privileges for the abbots of Fulda in the 10th century, though some of them are falsehoods. However, none of them make any reference to the cardinalate of these abbots |
| Werinhar, O.S.B., abbot of Fulda (968–982) | Cardinal created by Benedict VII | There exist numerous papal privileges for the abbots of Fulda in the 10th century, though some of them are falsehoods. However, none of them make any reference to the cardinalate of these abbots |

=== Cardinals not attested in the contemporary sources ===
The following cardinals allegedly promoted in 10th century up to date have not been identified in the published documents from the Roman registers:

- Bobone, cardinal deacon in 928
- Bonifazio, of the counts of Tusculum, bishop of Sutri and cardinal under pope Marinus II (942–946)
- Pietro, cardinal-priest of S. Lorenzo in Damaso in 946
- Giovanni, of the counts of Tusculum, cardinal priest in 956
- Giovanni, cardinal-priest of Ss. XII Apostoli in 964
- Giuliano, cardinal-priest of S. Pietro in Vincoli in 972

=== Fictitious individuals ===
Two cardinals, ostensibly elected to the papacy, are fictitious persons which owe their existence an onomastic confusion

- Donus cardinal deacon ca. 972, elected pope Donus II in December 973 and died in March 974
- Giovanni, cardinal created by Benedict VII, elected Pope John XV in August 985, died without having been consecrated

They both are not listed in the official series of Popes in Annuario Pontificio.

=== Cardinals known only from the false documents ===
Some documents which bear the subscriptions of the cardinals have been recognized as falsehoods and although some authors unaware of this fact used them as sources for the reconstruction of the catalogue of cardinals in the 10th century, they are useless for this purpose:

- Bull of Stephen VIII dated 8 June 940/42
  - Eustachius, cardinal-bishop of Albano
  - Gratiosus, cardinal-bishop of Palestrina
  - Georgius, cardinal-bishop of Porto
  - Deodatus, cardinal-bishop of Ostia
  - Gregorius, cardinal priest of S. Pietro in Vincoli
  - Faustinus, cardinal of S. Pietro
  - Benedictus, cardinal priest of S. Cecilia
  - Andreas, cardinal-archpriest of Lateran
  - Julianus, cardinal priest of Lateran
  - Marcus, cardinal of S. Pietro
- Bull of Marinus II in favor of the church of Adria dated 11 June 944 (?)
  - Benignus, cardinal-bishop of Ostia
  - Grisogonus (or Georgius), cardinal-bishop of Porto
- Privilege of Leo VIII in favor of Emperor Otto I dated 29 April 964
  - Eustachius, cardinal-bishop of Albano
  - Gratiosus, cardinal-bishop of Palestrina
  - Georgius, cardinal-bishop of Porto
  - Deodatus, cardinal-bishop of Ostia
  - Benenatus (or Januarius), cardinal-priest of S. Cecilia
  - Julianus, cardinal-priest of Lateran
  - Marco, cardinal-priest of S. Paolo
  - Gregorius, cardinal-priest of S. Pietro in Vincoli
  - Andreas, cardinal-archpriest of Lateran
  - Benedictus, cardinal-priest of S. Maria in Trastevere
  - Leo, cardinal-priest of S. Croce in Gerusalemme
  - Faustinus, cardinal of S. Pietro
- Bull of Leo VIII dated 10 November 964:
  - Wido, cardinal-bishop of Albano
- Privilege of Emperor Otto I for Theobald de Martinengo of Brescia dated 6 October 968 (it mentions as living person pope Anastasius III, who died in 913)
  - Eustachius, cardinal-bishop of Albano
  - Dondatus, cardinal-bishop of Ostia
  - Belenatus, cardinal-priest of S. Pietro in Vincoli.
  - Faustinus, cardinal-priest of S. Petri.
- Bull of Benedict VI in favor of the bishop of Tivoli dated 21 December 973
  - Joannes, cardinal-bishop of Labico (Frascati)
- Bull of Benedict VII in favor of abbot Leo of San Rofillo in Forlimpopoli dated 20/22 August 980.
  - Marcus, cardinal-priest of S. Stefano
  - Joannes, cardinal-priest of S. Croce
  - Leo, cardinal-priest of Ss. Giovanni e Paolo

== Sources ==
- J. P. Migne: Patrologia Latina
- "Monumenta Germaniae Historica (MGH)".
- Paul Fridolin Kehr (ed. vol. 1–8), Walter Holtzmann (ed. vol. 9–10) (1906–1975). Regesta pontificum Romanorum. Italia Pontificia. Vol. 1–10 (in Latin). SUL Books in the Public Domain. Archived from the original on 2006-02-23.
- Jaffé, Philipp (1885). Regesta pontificum Romanorum ab condita Ecclesia ad annum post Christum natum MCXCVIII. Vol. I. (in Latin). Leipzig. Archived from the original on 2020-10-03.
- Horace Mann: The lives of the popes. Vol. 4, London 1910
- Regesta Imperii Online
- Memorials of Saint Dunstan, ed. W. Stubbs, London 1874
- Johannes Watterich: Pontificum romanorum Vita, vol. I, Leipzig 1862
- Schwartz, Gerhard (1913). Die Besetzung der Bistümern Reichsitaliens unter den sächsischen und salischen Kaisern mit den Listen der Bischöfe 951–1122 (in German). Verlag von B. G. Teubner in Leipzig und Berlin.
- Lorenzo Cardella, Memorie Storiche de' Cardinali della Santa Romana Chiesa, vol. I, pt. 1, Rome 1792
- Miranda, Salvador (1998–2009). The Cardinals of the Holy Roman Church: General list of Cardinals, 10th Century (900-999). Florida International University.
