= Pope Innocent II =

Head of the Catholic Church from 1130 to 1143

- Bishop of Rome
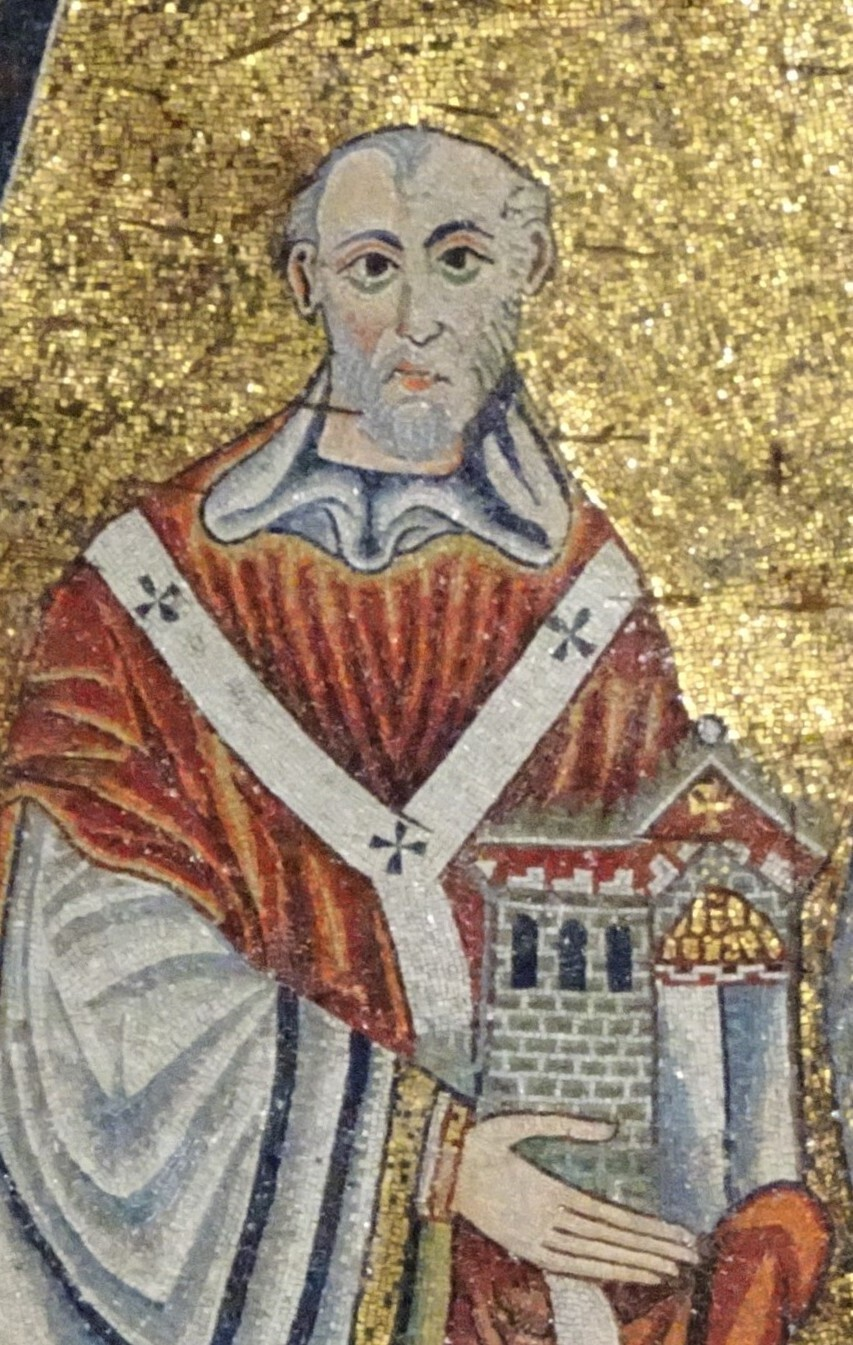
- Detail of a mosaic in the Roman church Santa Maria in Trastevere, built by Innocent II
- Church: Catholic Church
- Papacy began: 14 February 1130
- Papacy ended: 24 September 1143
- Predecessor: Honorius II
- Successor: Celestine II

Orders
- Ordination: 22 February 1130
- Consecration: 23 February 1130 by Giovanni Vitale
- Created cardinal: 1116 by Paschal II

Personal details
- Born: Gregorio Papareschi Rome, Papal States
- Died: 24 September 1143 Rome, Papal States
- Denomination: Catholic

Pope Innocent II (Latin: Innocentius II; died 24 September 1143), born Gregorio Papareschi, was head of the Catholic Church and ruler of the Papal States from 14 February 1130 to his death in 1143. His election as pope was controversial, and the first eight years of his reign were marked by a struggle for recognition against the supporters of Anacletus II. He reached an understanding with King Lothair III of Germany, who supported him against Anacletus, and whom he crowned Holy Roman emperor. Innocent went on to preside over the Second Council of the Lateran.

== Early years ==
Gregorio Papareschi came from a Roman family, probably of the rione Trastevere. Formerly a Cluniac monk, he was made cardinal deacon of Sant'Angelo in 1116 by Pope Paschal II. Gregorio was selected by Pope Callixtus II for various important and difficult missions, such as the one to Worms for the conclusion of the Concordat of Worms, the peace accord made with Holy Roman Emperor Henry V in 1122, and also the one that made peace with King Louis VI of France in 1123. In 1124, he became a close advisor to Pope Honorius II.

== Election ==
On the evening of 13 February 1130, Pope Honorius II died, and Gregorio was hastily elected as Pope Innocent II by a commission of six cardinals led by papal chancellor Haimeric. He was consecrated on 14 February, the following day. The other cardinals announced that Innocent had not been canonically elected—though the Bull of Nicholas II did not specify whether all the cardinals had to be present for the election to be valid—and chose Anacletus II, a Roman whose family were the enemy of Haimeric's supporters, the Frangipani. Anacletus' mixed group of supporters were powerful enough to take control of Rome while Innocent was forced to flee north.

== Papacy ==
=== Struggle against Anacletus ===
Anacletus had control of Rome, so Innocent II took ship for Pisa, and thence sailed by way of Genoa to France, where the influence of Bernard of Clairvaux readily secured his cordial recognition by the clergy and the court. In October 1130, he was duly acknowledged by King Lothair III of Germany and his bishops at the synod of Würzburg. In January 1131, he also had a favourable interview with Henry I of England at Chartres.

In August 1132, Lothar III undertook an expedition to Italy to set aside Anacletus as antipope and be crowned by Innocent. Anacletus and his supporters being in secure control of St. Peter's Basilica, the coronation ultimately took place in the Lateran Basilica (4 June 1133), but otherwise the expedition proved abortive. Innocent II invested Lothair as emperor and the territories belonging to Matilda of Tuscany in return for an annuity of 100 pounds of silver paid to the pope. After Lothar's hasty departure from Rome, Innocent fled to Pisa.

In May 1135, Innocent convened the council of Pisa, which was attended by over one hundred clerics and abbots. Innocent II had the council declare Anacletus and his supporters excommunicated. The second expedition by Lothar III in 1136 was no more decisive in its results, and the protracted struggle between the rival pontiffs was terminated only by the death of Anacletus II on 25 January 1138.

=== Second Lateran Council ===
At the Second Lateran council of April 1139, King Roger II of Sicily, Innocent II's most uncompromising foe, was excommunicated. Can. 29 of the Council banned the use of crossbows, as well as slings and bows, against Christians.

=== Treaty of Mignano ===
On 22 July 1139, at Galluccio, Roger II's son Roger III of Apulia ambushed the papal troops with a thousand knights and captured Innocent. On 25 July 1139, Innocent was forced to acknowledge the kingship and possessions of Roger with the Treaty of Mignano.

=== Involvement with Outremer ===
In his papal bull Omne Datum Optimum from March 1139, Innocent II had declared that the Knights Templar—a religious and military organization then twenty-one years old—should in the future be answerable only to the papacy. That same year he sent Alberic of Ostia to examine the conduct of the Latin Patriarch of Antioch establish ties with the Armenian Catholicos. The consequent Latin synod in Antioch, attended also by the Armenian Catholicos Gregory III, marked the symbolic beginning of Armenian-Latin high-level clerical contacts and according to Armenian sources Innocent sent Gregory a letter of greeting with a staff and pallium. On 25 September 1141, he wrote Catholicos Gregory III another long letter in which he asked him to cooperate with the Church of Rome and end the schism, which was achieved at the end of the century.

=== Death ===
Innocent II died on 24 September 1143 and was succeeded by Pope Celestine II.

== Legacy ==
In 1134, Innocent elevated as cardinal-nephew his nephew, Gregorio Papareschi. He did the same for his brother Pietro Papareschi, whom he made cardinal in 1142. Another nephew, Cinthio Capellus (died 1182), was also a cardinal, raised to the cardinalate in 1158 after Innocent's death.

Aside from the complete rebuilding of the ancient church of Santa Maria in Trastevere, which boldly features Ionic capitals from former colonnades in the Baths of Caracalla and other richly detailed spolia from Roman monuments, the remaining years of Innocent's life were almost as barren of permanent political results as the first had been. In the Lateran palace, he had a portrait painted depicting Lothar's oath to preserve the privileges of the city of Rome. Innocent's efforts to undo the mischief wrought in Rome by the long schism were almost entirely neutralized by a quarrel with his erstwhile supporter, Louis VII of France over the candidate for archbishop of Bourges, in the course of which that kingdom was laid under an interdict to press for the papal candidate, and by a struggle with the town of Tivoli in which he became involved. As a result, Roman factions that wished Tivoli annihilated took up arms against Innocent.

In 1143, as the pope lay dying, the Commune of Rome, to resist papal power, began deliberations that officially reinstated the Roman Senate the following year. The pope was interred in a porphyry sarcophagus that contemporary tradition asserted had been the Emperor Hadrian's.

== See also ==
- Bull of Gniezno
- Cardinals created by Innocent II
- List of popes

== Bibliography ==
- Aurell, Jaume (2020). Medieval Self-Coronations: The History and Symbolism of a Ritual. Cambridge University Press.
- Bagni, Giampiero (2020). "A multidisciplinary approach to the production of wine on Templar estates: The Bologna commandery". In Morton, Nicholas (ed.). The Military Orders Volume VII: Piety, Pugnacity and Property. Routledge.
- Clark, Anne L. (2016). Elisabeth of Schonau: A Twelfth-Century Visionary. University of Pennsylvania Press.
- Cotts, John D. (2012). Europe's Long Twelfth Century: Order, Anxiety and Adaptation, 1095-1229. Palgrave Macmillan.
- Duggan, Anne J., ed. (2000). The Correspondence of Thomas Becket, Archbishop of Canterbury, 1162-1170: Letters. Vol. I: 1-175. Clarendon Press.
- Clapp, James A.; Dadoyan, Seta B. (8 September 2017). The Armenians in the Medieval Islamic World: Armenian Realpolitik in the Islamic World and Diverging Paradigmscase of Cilicia Eleventh to Fourteenth Centuries. Routledge. ISBN 978-1-351-48576-0.
- Duggan, Anne J. (2016). "Jura sua unicuique tribuat: Innocent II and the advance of the learned laws". In Doran, John; Smith, Damian J. (eds.). Pope Innocent II (1130-43), The World vs The City. Routledge. pp. 272–310.
- Houben, Hubert (2002). Roger II of Sicily: Ruler between East and West. Translated by Loud, Graham A.; Milburn, Diane. Cambridge University Press.
- Hughes, Philip (1976). A History of the Church to the Eve of the Reformation (PDF). London: Sheed & Ward.
- Jotischky, Andrew (21 July 2018). Pope Eugenius III (1145-1153): the First Cistercian Pope. Amsterdam University Press. ISBN 978-90-485-3720-4.
- Kinney, Dale (1986). "Spolia from the Baths of Caracalla in Sta. Maria in Trastevere". The Art Bulletin. 68.3 (September) (3): 379–397. doi:10.1080/00043079.1986.10788359.
- Lapina, Elizabeth; Morton, Nicholas (22 May 2017). The Uses of the Bible in Crusader Sources. Brill. ISBN 978-90-04-34121-0.
- Lees, Jay Terry (1998). Anselm of Havelberg: Deeds Into Words in the Twelfth Century. Brill.
- Montaubin, Pascal (2016). "Innocent II and Capetian France". In Smith, Damian J.; Doran, John (eds.). Pope Innocent II (1130-43): The World Vs the City. Routledge. pp. 107–151.
- Morris, Colin (1989). The Papal Monarchy: The Western Church from 1050 to 1250 (Oxford History of the Christian Church). Clarendon Press.
- Pacaut, Marcel (2002). "Innocent II". In Levillain, Philippe (ed.). The Papacy: An Encyclopedia. Vol. 2: Gaius-Proxies. Routledge. pp. 783–785.
- Robinson, I.S. (1990). The Papacy, 1073-1198. Cambridge University Press.
- Robinson, I.S. (1995). "The Papacy, 1122-1198". In Luscombe, David; Riley-Smith, Jonathan (eds.). The New Cambridge Medieval History. Vol. 4, C.1024 – c.1198, Part 2. Cambridge University Press.
- Rogers, Randall (1997). Latin Siege Warfare in the Twelfth Century. Clarendon Press.
- Schroeder, H. J. (1937). Disciplinary Decrees of the General Councils: Text, Translation and Commentary. B. Herder.
- Schwaiger, Georg (2002). "Honorius II". In Levillain, Philippe (ed.). The Papacy: An Encyclopedia. Vol. 2: Gaius-Proxies. Routledge. pp. 732–733.
- Phillips, Jonathan P. (2007). The Second Crusade: Extending the Frontiers of Christendom. Yale University Press. ISBN 9780300112740.
- Ryan, James D. (1 May 2001). "Toleration Denied: Armenia between East and West in the Era of the Crusades". In Gervers, Michael; Powell, James M. (eds.). Tolerance and Intolerance: Social Conflict in the Age of the Crusades. Syracuse University Press. ISBN 978-0-8156-2869-9.
- Somerville, Robert (1970). "The Council of Pisa, 1135: A Re-Examination of the Evidence for the Canons". Speculum. 45, No. 1 (Jan.) (1). The University of Chicago Press: 98–114. doi:10.2307/2855987. JSTOR 2855987. S2CID 162871829.
- Truax, Jean (2017). Aelred the Peacemaker: The Public Life of a Cistercian Abbot. Liturgical Press.
- Wheeler, Bonnie; McLaughlin, Mary Martin, eds. (2009). The Letters of Heloise and Abelard: A Translation of Their Collected Correspondence and Related Writings. Palgrave Macmillan.

Catholic Church titles
Preceded by Honorius II	Pope; 1130–43	Succeeded by Celestine II
