= Papal consistory =

Meeting of the College of Cardinals

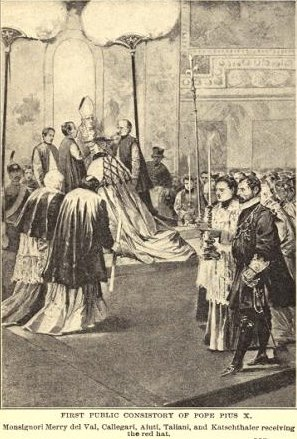
First public consistory of Pope Pius X

In the Catholic Church, a consistory is a formal meeting of the College of Cardinals called by the pope. There are two kinds of consistories, extraordinary and ordinary. An "extraordinary" consistory is held to allow the pope to consult with the entire membership of the College of Cardinals. An "ordinary" consistory is ceremonial in nature and is normally attended by cardinals resident in Rome. For example, the pope elevates new cardinals to the College at a consistory; Pope Francis called consistories for ceremonies of canonization; and Pope Benedict announced his decision to retire in 2013 at a consistory.

A meeting of the College of Cardinals to elect a new pope is not a consistory, but a conclave.

== History ==
The term consistory comes from the Latin: con-sistere; "stand together". Early popes conferred with their Roman presbytery which included the deacons appointed to oversee different parts of Rome. This tradition continued as deacons were replaced with cardinals and those cardinals (from among whom the pope was chosen) continued to meet at the request of successive popes.

Consistories became an opportunity for the pope to decide matters of state and dispense justice directly, with the support and advice of Roman bishops and those bishops from other regions who happened to be in Rome. Pope Leo IV ordered that consistories be held twice weekly. Pope John VIII relaxed that edict slightly and an order of twice-monthly consistories. With the Gregorian Reform, the Church limited outside influences on the papacy and the selection of popes, and the power of cardinals increased. Tradition developed that the pope would use consistories (closer to twice-yearly by the 17th century) to reveal a list of those that were to be elevated to the rank of cardinal.

Eventually, responsibility for matters of justice was transferred to the Roman Rota and the functions of the Church were transferred to the Roman Curia reducing the need for regular consistories. Subsequently, consistories became primarily ceremonial in function.

Since 2016, Pope Francis summoned fewer consistories of all cardinals than some of his papal predecessors had done. Disquiet over the lack of consistories was due to their being one of the few official occasions for future members of a papal conclave to meet and get to know each other.

== Consistories for the creation of cardinals ==
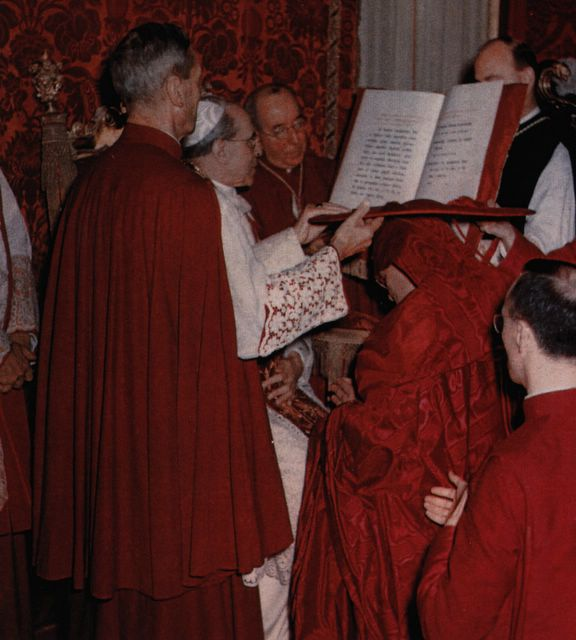
Pius XII imposing the galero on a cardinal at a consistory.

At a consistory for the creation of cardinals, the pope creates new cardinals in the presence of a number of, if not all, extant cardinals. Though the names of the new cardinals have typically been announced in advance, they only formally become cardinals at the consistory, when the pope formally publishes the decree of elevation, even if the new cardinal is not present. (Note: For example, Bishop John Fisher was imprisoned by King Henry VIII on 26 April 1534. A year later, in May 1535, Pope Paul III created Fisher a cardinal. King Henry, however, forbade the bringing of the cardinal's hat into England, declaring that he would send the cardinal's head to Rome instead. Cardinal Fisher was beheaded a month later on 22 June.)

New cardinals present are presented with their rings, zucchetto (small skullcaps), and biretta (four-cornered silk hats) by the pope. (Note: Formerly they also received an elaborate broad-brimmed tasseled hat, the galerum rubrum, at the ceremony, but Pope Paul VI abolished this in 1967 and those cardinals who want these obtain them privately from a maker in Rome.)

The zucchetto and the biretta are scarlet, the distinctive color of cardinals' vesture.

At the consistory, new cardinals, with certain exceptions, are assigned titular churches in the Diocese of Rome. (Note: Pope Paul VI abolished their functional involvement in the governance of these churches; the cardinals formally "take possession" of these churches at a later date.)

== Recent consistories ==
Benedict used a consistory on 11 February 2013 to announce, in Latin, that he would retire as pope effective 28 February 2013.

Pope Benedict XVI created cardinals at five consistories, with the last before he resigned held in November 2012. In 2007 and 2010, he held day-long meetings with the entire College, the cardinals designate, and various advisers, on the day preceding the consistory of creation.

Pope Francis followed this custom for his first two consistories. His 2014 consistory for creating new cardinals was preceded by an extraordinary consistory where Cardinal Walter Kasper gave an address designed to launch the discussions of the Synod on the Family held later in the year. In 2015 a similar extraordinary consistory—held immediately prior to a consistory to create cardinals—discussed reform of the Roman Curia. Francis created cardinals at ten consistories at roughly annual intervals, with the last in December 2024, a few months before his death.

Pope Leo XIV held the first ordinary consistory of his papacy on 13 June 2025, where he announced the canonization dates of nine Blesseds. An extraordinary consistory, summoning all cardinals worldwide, took place in the Vatican on January 7-8, 2026, after the closing of the Holy Door at St. Peter's Basilica on January 6, 2026, marking the conclusion of the 2025 Jubilee. The consistory was intended to foster discernment and offer “support and counsel to the Holy Father in the exercise of his lofty and weighty responsibility in the governance of the universal Church.” At the end of the consistory Leo announced that he intended to hold another extraordinary consistory in June 26-29, 2026, and one each year after, in keeping with a request from pre-2025 conclave general congregations. The second extraordinary consistory of the College of Cardinals took place from June 26-27, 2026, at the Paul VI Audience Hall.

== See also ==
- List of the creations of the cardinals
- In pectore, a way of creating a cardinal without public announcement
