= Salvador Miranda (historian) =

American bibliographer, librarian and historian (1939–2024)

- Born: October 18, 1939; Havana, Cuba
- Died: June 1, 2024 (aged 84); Miami Beach, Florida, U.S.
- Education: B.A. Biscayne College; M.A. Villanova University; M.S. Florida State University
- Occupations: Church historian Librarian; Bibliographer

Salvador Miranda (October 18, 1939 – June 1, 2024) was an American bibliographer, librarian and church historian.

== Biography ==
Miranda was born on October 18, 1939, in Havana, Cuba. In 1958, he graduated from the Jesuit-run Colegio de Belén in Havana after which he attended the law school at the University of Havana. After the Cuban Revolution in 1963, he moved to Puerto Rico to study humanities at the University of Puerto Rico. As a young Cuban exile, he was a member of the Cuban-American expeditionary force in the failed Bay of Pigs invasion. He then returned to school graduating with a B.A. in History and Philosophy from Biscayne College; an M.A. in Modern European History in 1974 from Villanova University; and an M.S. in Library and Information Science in 1976 from Florida State University. After graduating from Florida State, he accepted a position as the Latin American and Caribbean Bibliographer at the University of Florida Libraries in Gainesville. In 1986, he served as assistant director for Collection Management at Florida International University Libraries in Miami. On June 30, 2001, he retired.

The title of his 319-page master's thesis in history was The Sacred College of Cardinals in the Twentieth Century (1903-1973): Developments, Documents and Biographies which he expanded to include earlier cardinals and then digitized, making it available as an online resource. In appreciation of his research, Bishop Cipriano Calderón Polo, the founding director of the Spanish edition of the Vatican newspaper, L'Osservatore Romano and the vice president of the Pontifical Commission for Latin America, whom he corresponded with for years over the history of the episcopacy, invited him to present at the first continental meeting of bishops from Latin America in 1999.

His research and expertise has been used as a resource by various publications including The New York Times, The Cleveland Plain Dealer, Religion News Service, La Stampa, and The Wall Street Journal.

On 28 June 2023, Miranda posted on The Cardinals of the Holy Roman Church's main page that he had been hospitalized with cardiac issues. He died on June 1, 2024, at the age of 84.

== Works ==
- The Cardinals of the Holy Roman Church, A digital resource created and produced by Salvador Miranda, consisting of the biographical entries of the cardinals from 492 to 2021 and of the events and documents concerning the origin of the Roman cardinalate and its historical evolution (in English)
- Episcopologio de la Iglesia Católica en Cuba, an online accessible directory of the Roman Catholic bishops of Cuba (in Spanish)
