= Warrior monk =

Concept describing members of medieval military religious orders

Warrior monk or monk-soldier is an established expression derived from Bernard of Clairvaux used to designate members of military and hospitaller religious orders, primarily the Knights Templar.

The expression "monk-soldiers" is commonly used to describe the Templars. Its use is not illegitimate, as Saint Bernard himself associated the words "monk" and "knight". Bernard of Clairvaux, in De laude novae militiae, wrote: "It is as remarkable as it is astonishing to see how they know how to show themselves at the same time gentler than lambs and more terrible than lions, to the point that one does not know whether they should be called religious men or soldiers, or rather that no other names seem better suited to them than these two, since they know how to unite the gentleness of the former with the valor of the latter".

== Context ==
The military orders—at least the three major ones, the Templars, the Hospitallers, and the Teutonic Order—were initially composed of brothers or monks who took religious vows and lived under a monastic rule, with the particularity of "combining monastic life with the profession of arms". It is the rule that defines the order: the Hospitallers followed the Rule of Saint Augustine, the Templars the Rule of Saint Benedict, and the orders of Calatrava, Alcántara, and Aviz followed the same rule as Cîteaux.

Jean-Loup Lemaître notes that "the concept of a 'religious order' is relatively recent, and modern classifications are not those of the past: ordo monasticus and ordo canonicus designated in the Middle Ages a way of life governed by one of the three rules adopted at the Synods of Aachen of 816–817, to which would later be added in the 12th century that of Francis of Assisi, and by the 'institution' (institutio), which brought together the texts regulating liturgical practice and community life, in other words the 'observance'; 'ordinaries', 'customaries', 'constitutions', and 'statutes'".

With the Crusades, "for the first time in the history of Christendom, soldiers lived like monks" or as monks. The Hospitallers took vows of poverty, chastity, and obedience; it was only from 1136 onward that their military activity is attested, while their spiritual life was enriched by devotion to the sick and the poor. Initially, the Templars aspired to monastic life, but service in the militia interrupted an essentially ascetic existence. The Teutonic Knights followed a rule similar to that of the Templars, with a clause concerning hospital work inherited from the Hospitallers who had sheltered them. The brothers lived in strongholds a life that was both religious and military..

== Early hypotheses ==
Joseph von Hammer as early as 1818 compared Christian military orders (especially the Templars) with certain Islamic models such as the Shiʿite Assassins. In 1820, José Antonio Conde suggested that they were created on the model of the ribat, a fortified religious institution combining religious life with combat against the enemies of Islam. None of these views is accepted today: Jean de Joinville, biographer of Saint Louis, reports the visit of the Old Man of the Mountain, leader of the Nizaris, to Acre after the creation of the Templars; moreover, it appears that no ribat existed in Palestine prior to the foundation of the military orders.

The origins of the “monk-soldiers” may instead lie in the Knights of Saint Peter (milites Sancti Petri), a militia created in 1053 by Pope Leo IX to fight the Norman forces of southern Italy at the Battle of Civitate, or in the establishment of the Order of the Holy Sepulchre after the capture of Jerusalem in 1099 by Godfrey of Bouillon. The order was tasked with assisting the Patriarch of Jerusalem in his duties. A number of men-at-arms from the crusade entered the patriarch’s service to protect the Church of the Holy Sepulchre. These men were known as Knights of the Holy Sepulchre (milites Sancti Sepulcri). They were not canons, nor had they taken vows; they were therefore not yet “monk-soldiers”.

== History ==
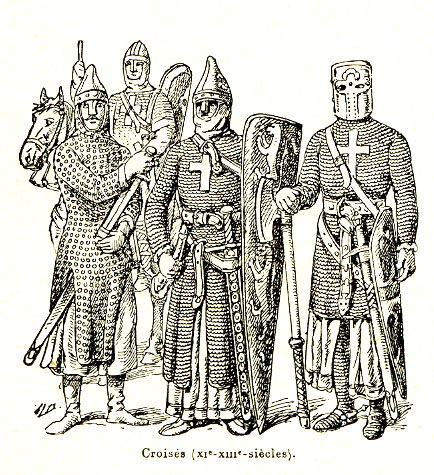
Crusaders

These "monk-soldiers" were not an obvious development, as they stood in opposition to the ideal of the cloistered and contemplative monk. After the capture of Jerusalem, a precarious peace prevailed in Palestine. Bands of brigands and Saracen incursions created constant insecurity. Most crusaders returned home after the conquest; only a few knights and poorly organized troops remained, largely confined to cities, making travel between them dangerous. The spread of infirmaries posed problems for sick pilgrims and for the Hospitallers themselves.

=== Beginnings of the Templars (1118–1129) ===
According to William of Tyre, it was the Champagne baron Hugues de Payens who proposed to Baldwin II of Jerusalem the creation of a community of the "Poor Knights of Christ" to ensure the safety of roads. At the Council of Nablus in 1120, these knights were invited to take up arms again. The new brotherhood was installed by Baldwin and Warmund of Picquigny, Patriarch of Jerusalem, on the site of the former Al-Aqsa Mosque, believed to be the location of the Temple of Solomon; hence the name milites Templi, "Knights of the Temple", or Knights Templar.

=== Papal recognition ===
These knights, who took vows of obedience, poverty, and chastity yet fought the Saracens with weapons in hand, raised theological concerns: they were thought to be in a state of sin for killing enemies, even if "infidels". Hugues de Payens appealed to the abbot of Clairvaux, a relative of his, to intercede with the pope. Bernard of Clairvaux wrote De laude novae militiae ("In Praise of the New Knighthood"), developing the concept of "malicide" (malicidium): the knights of Christ were not killing a man but the evil within him. Hugues incorporated these ideas in his letter De Christi militibus ("The Soldiers of Christ"), presented to the Council of Troyes in January 1129, which approved the new order. The primitive (Latin) rule, written in 1128, was appended to the council's record.

=== Order of Saint John of Jerusalem ===
In 1080, Blessed Gerard founded a new hospice in Jerusalem. Official recognition came in 1113 under Pope Paschal II, who imposed, in addition to the vows of poverty, obedience, and chastity, a fourth vow: hospitality.

The Hospitallers' military role began in 1137 when Fulk I granted them the fortress of Beth Gibelin. They subsequently acquired and built major fortresses, including Krak des Chevaliers. Although initially resisted by the Church, their military function was fully recognized after the Battle of Hattin in 1187. The status of "monk-soldier" was formally confirmed only in 1205 at the general chapter held at Margat.

== See also ==
- Las armas y las letras
- Shaolin Monastery
- Sōhei

== Bibliography ==
- Demurger, Alain (2005). Les Templiers [The Templars] (in French). Paris: Seuil.
- Demurger, Alain (2008). Les Templiers (in French) (2nd ed.). Paris: Seuil.
- Demurger, Alain (2010). Moines et Guerriers, les ordres religieux-militaires au Moyen Âge [Monks and Warriors: Religious-Military Orders in the Middle Ages] (in French). Paris: Seuil.
- Demurger, Alain (April 2002). "L'origine des ordres religieux militaires" [The Origin of Military Religious Orders] (PDF). Clio (in French).
- Galimard Flavigny, Bertrand (2006). Histoire de l'ordre de Malte [History of the Order of Malta] (in French). Paris: Perrin.
- Galimard Flavigny, Bertrand (2007). Les chevaliers de Malte [The Knights of Malta] (in French). Paris: Découverte Gallimard.
- Lemaître, Jean-Loup (2019). Autour des livres, du nécrologe au martyrologe [Around Books, from Necrology to Martyrology] (in French). Geneva: Droz.
- Seward, Desmond (2008). Les Chevaliers de Dieu, les ordres religieux militaires du Moyen Âge à nos jours [The Knights of God: Military Religious Orders from the Middle Ages to the Present] (in French). Paris: Perrin.
