= Second Council of the Lateran =

12th-century Christian church council

- Date: 1139
- Accepted by: Catholic Church
- Previous council: First Council of the Lateran
- Next council: Third Council of the Lateran
- Convoked by: Pope Innocent II
- President: Pope Innocent II
- Attendance: 1000
- Topics: schism of Antipope Anacletus II
- Documents and statements: Thirty canons, mostly repeating those of the First Lateran Council, clerical marriage declared invalid, clerical dress regulated, attacks on clerics punished by excommunication

The Second Council of the Lateran was the tenth ecumenical council recognized by the Catholic Church. It was convened by Pope Innocent II in April 1139 and attended by close to a thousand clerics. Its immediate task was to neutralise the after-effects of the schism which had arisen after the death of Pope Honorius II in 1130 and the papal election that year that established Pietro Pierleoni as the antipope Anacletus II.

Anacletus had been elected by a majority of the cardinals and had the support of the people in the city of Rome. Innocent had been elected by a minority of 8 cardinals, but these were the only ones designated as electors by Honorius II before his death. Anacletus' death in 1138 had largely solved the tension between the rival factions. The council assembled at the Lateran Palace in Rome. Innocent excommunicated Roger II of Sicily. The supposedly schismatic Proto-Reformer Arnold of Brescia was removed from office and banished from Italy. The council condemned the teachings of the followers of the heresiarchs Peter of Bruys and Henry of Lausanne. Finally, the council drew up measures for the amendment of ecclesiastical morals and discipline, which the council fathers considered to have grown lax.

== Tenth Ecumenical Council ==
After the death of Honorius II, Petrus Leonis, under the name of Anacletus II, was elected as Pope by a majority of the cardinals and with the support of the people of Rome on the same day as a minority elected Innocent II. Before his death in 1130, Honorius II had modified the procedures for the election of his successor, designating just 8 cardinals as electors; in protest, the remaining cardinals elected their own pope against the results of the small body of electors. Thus, In 1135, Innocent II held a council at Pisa, which confirmed his authority and condemned Anacletus. Anacletus's death in 1138 helped largely to solve the tension between rival factions. Nevertheless, Innocent decided to call the Tenth Ecumenical Council.

The council assembled at the Lateran Palace and nearly a thousand prelates attended. In his opening statement Innocent deposed those who had been ordained and instituted by Anacletus or any of his adherents. King Roger II of Sicily was excommunicated for maintaining what was thought to be a schismatic attitude. Arnold of Brescia, too, was removed from office and banished from Italy.

The council also condemned the teachings of the Petrobrusians and the Henricians, the followers of Peter of Bruys and Henry of Lausanne. Finally, the council drew up measures for the amendment of ecclesiastical morals and discipline which the council fathers considered had grown lax. Many of the canons relating to these matters were mostly a restating of the decrees of the Council of Reims and the Council of Clermont.

== Select canons ==
The most important results of the council included:

- Canon 4: Injunction to bishops and ecclesiastics not to cause scandal by wearing ostentatious clothes but to dress modestly.
- Canons 6, 7: Repeated the First Lateran Council's condemnation of marriage and concubinage among priests, deacons, subdeacons, monks, and nuns.
- Canon 10: Excommunicated laity who failed to pay the tithes due to the bishops,
- Canon 12: Fixed the periods and the duration of the Truce of God.
- Canon 14: Prohibition, under pain of deprivation of Christian burial, of jousts and tournaments which endangered life.
- Canon 20: Kings and princes were ordered to dispense justice in consultation with the bishops.
- Canon 23: Forbade the condemnation of legitimate marriages.
- Canon 25: Forbade any cleric to accept a benefice from a layman.
- Canon 27: Nuns were prohibited from singing the Divine Office in the same choir with monks.
- Canon 28: No church was to be left vacant more than three years from the death of the bishop; secular canons who excluded regular canons or monks from episcopal elections were condemned.
- Canon 29: The use of crossbows and bows against Christians was prohibited.

Another decision confirmed the right of religious houses of a diocese to participate in the election of the diocese's bishop.

== Sources ==
- Houben, Hubert (2002). Roger II of Sicily: Ruler between East and West. Translated by Loud, Graham A.; Milburn, Diane. Cambridge University Press.
