= First Council of the Lateran =

Roman Catholic synod of 1123

- Date: 1123
- Accepted by: Catholic Church
- Previous council: Fourth Council of Constantinople
- Next council: Second Council of the Lateran
- Convoked by: Pope Callixtus II
- President: Pope Callixtus II
- Attendance: 300–1000
- Topics: Investiture Controversy
- Documents and statements: Pope's right to invest bishops, condemnation of simony, "Truce of God" (war allowed only Monday–Wednesday, and only in the summer and fall), 22 canons

The First Council of the Lateran was the 9th ecumenical council recognised by the Catholic Church. The first ecumenical council to be held in Western Europe and the first since the Great Schism of 1054, it was convoked by Pope Callixtus II in December 1122, immediately after the Concordat of Worms. The council sought to bring an end to the practice of the conferring of ecclesiastical benefices by people who were laymen, free the election of bishops and abbots from secular influence, clarify the separation of spiritual and temporal affairs, re-establish the principle that spiritual authority resides solely in the Church and abolish the claim of the Holy Roman Emperor to influence papal elections.

The council was significant in size: 300 bishops and more than 600 abbots assembled at Rome's Lateran Palace in March 1123, and Callixtus II presided in person. During the council, the decisions of the Concordat of Worms were read and ratified. Various other decisions were promulgated.

== Background ==
The First Lateran Council was called by Pope Callixtus II whose reign began on 1 February 1119. It demarcated the end of the Investiture Controversy, which had begun before the time of Pope Gregory VII. The issues had been contentious and had continued with unabated bitterness for almost a century. Guido, as he had been called before his elevation to the papacy, was the son of William I, Count of Burgundy. He was closely connected with nearly all the royal houses of Europe on both sides of his family. He had been named the papal legate to France by Pope Paschal II. During Guido's tenure in this office, Paschal II yielded to the military threats of Henry V, Holy Roman Emperor, and was induced to issue the Privilegium in 1111. By that document, the Church gave up much of what had been claimed and subsequently attained by Pope Gregory VII and his Gregorian Reforms.

The concessions did not bring the expected peace but were received with violent reactionary opposition everywhere. Europe had come to expect an end to the Investiture Controversy and was not willing to return to the old days, when the Holy Roman Emperor named the pope. The greatest resistance was seen in France and was led by Guido, who still held the office of the papal legate. He had been present in the Lateran Synod of 1112 which had proclaimed the Privilegium of 1111. On his return to France, Guido convoked an assembly of the French and Burgundian bishops at Vienne (1112). There, the lay investiture of the clergy (the practice of the king, especially the Holy Roman Emperor, of naming bishops and the Pope) was denounced as heretical. A sentence of excommunication was pronounced against Henry V, who had extorted through violence from the Pope the concessions documented in the Privilegium. The agreement was deemed to be opposed to the interests of the Church. The decrees from the assembly of Vienne which denounced the Privilegium were sent to Paschal II with a request for confirmation. Pope Paschal II confirmed them, which were received in general terms, on 20 October 1112.

Guido was later created cardinal by Pope Paschal II. The latter did not seem to have been pleased with Guido's bold and forward attacks upon Henry V, Holy Roman Emperor. On the death of Paschal II, 21 January 1118, Gelasius II was elected pope. He was immediately seized by the Italian allies of Henry V and on his liberation by the populace, he fled to Gaeta, where he was crowned. Henry V demanded the confirmation of the Privilegium and received no satisfactory reply. He then set about naming Burdinus, the archbishop of Braga, as his own pope, who assumed the name Gregory VIII but came to be known as Antipope Gregory VIII. Burdinus had already been deposed and excommunicated because he had crowned Henry V as the Holy Roman Emperor in Rome in 1117.

The excommunication of Burdinus was reiterated in Canon 6 of the document produced by Lateran I. Gelasius II promptly excommunicated the antipope Gregory VIII and Henry V. Gelasius was forced to flee under duress from the army of Henry V and took refuge in the monastery of Cluny, where he died in January 1119. On the fourth day after the death of Gelasius II, 1 February 1119, mainly by the exertions of Cardinal Cuno, Guido was elected pope and assumed the title of Callixtus II. He was crowned Pope at Vienne on 9 February 1119.

Because of his close connection with the great royal families of Germany, France, England and Denmark, Callixtus II's papacy was received with much anticipation and celebration throughout Europe. There was a real hope throughout the Continent that the Investiture Controversy might be settled once and for all. In the interest of conciliation, even the papal embassy was received by Henry V, Holy Roman Emperor, at Strasburg. However, it soon became clear that Henry was not willing to concede his presumed and ancient right to name the pope and the bishops within his kingdom. Perhaps to demonstrate conciliation or because of political necessity, Henry withdrew his support for Antipope Gregory VIII.

It was agreed that Henry and Pope Callixtus II would meet at Mousson. On 8 June 1119, Callixtus II held a synod at Toulouse to proclaim the disciplinary reforms he had worked to attain in the French Church. In October, 1119, he opened the council at Reims. Louis VI of France and most of the barons of France attended this council, along with more than 400 bishops and abbots. The Pope was also to meet with Henry V, Holy Roman Emperor at Mousson. However, Henry showed up with an army of 30,000 men. Callixtus II left Reims for Mousson, but upon learning of the warlike stance of Henry quickly retreated to Reims. There, the Church dealt with issues of simony and concubinage of the clergy.

It was clear by now that Henry was in no mood to reconcile, and a compromise with him was not to be had. The conclave at Reims considered the situation and determined, as an entire Church, to formally excommunicate both Henry V and the antipope Gregory VIII. This occurred on October 30, 1119. While at Reims, Callixtus II tried to effect a settlement with Henry I of England and his brother Robert, which also met with failure.

Callixtus II was determined to enter Rome, which was occupied by the German forces and Antipope Gregory VIII. There was an uprising by the population, which forced Gregory to flee the city. After much political and military intrigue in Rome and the southern Italian states, Gregory was formally deposed and Callixtus II was generally recognised as the legitimate Pope in 1121. Having become the established power in Italy, Callixtus II now returned the conflict with Henry V over the issue of lay investiture. Henry had been the recipient of great pressure from many of his barons in Germany over his conflict with the pope. Some had entered into open rebellion. Henry was forced by circumstances to seek a peace with Callixtus. Initial negotiations were conducted in October 1121 at Würzburg. Lambert, the Cardinal of Ostia, was dispatched to convoke a synod at Worms, which began on 8 September 1122. By 23 September, the Concordat of Worms, also called the Pactum Calixtinum, was concluded. On his side, the emperor gave up his claim to investiture with ring and crosier and granted the freedom of election to the episcopal sees.

The elections of bishops could be witnessed by the emperor or his representatives. Callixtus II obtained the right to name bishops throughout Germany, but still did not have that power in much of Burgundy and Italy.

The First Lateran Council was convoked to confirm the Concordat of Worms. The council was most representative with nearly three hundred bishops and six hundred abbots from every part of Catholic Europe being present. It convened on 18 March 1123. Decrees were also passed directed against simony, concubinage among the clergy, church robbers, and forgers of Church documents; the council also reaffirmed indulgences for Crusaders. The Council ruled that the crusades to the Holy Land and the Reconquista of Spain were of equal standing.

In the remaining few years of his life, Callixtus II attempted to secure the status of the Church as it had existed at the end of the reign of Pope Gregory VII. He reorganized and reformed the churches around Rome, canonized Conrad of Constance, condemned the teaching of Peter de Bruis, confirmed the Bishop Thurston of York against the wishes of Henry I of England and affirmed the freedom of York from the see of Canterbury. Callixtus II died on December 13, 1124, and was succeeded by Pope Honorius II.

Callixtus II was a strong figure who brought a relative, if tentative, peace between Germany and the Church. The Concordat of Worms and the First Lateran Council changed forever the belief in the divine right of kings to name the pope and bishops and reshaped the nature of church and state forever.

== Text of the council ==
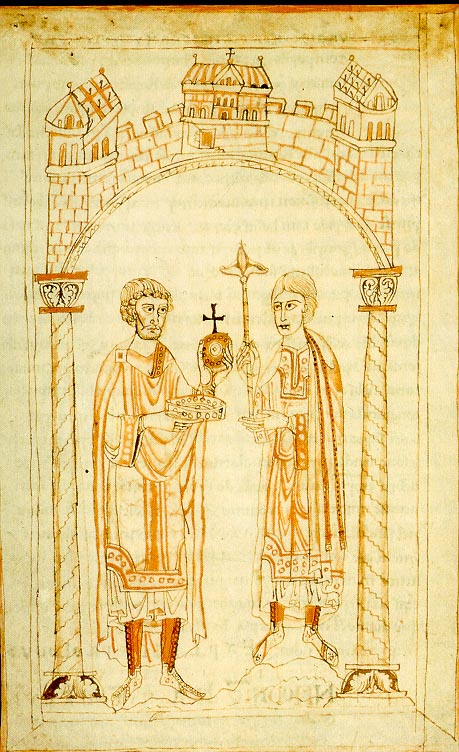
Henry IV ceding his rule of the Holy Roman Empire to his son, Henry V.

Texts of the First Lateran Council may vary in both wording and numbering of the canons depending on source. In this translation, the precepts of the Concordat of Worms are codified in Canons 2, 4 and 10.

CANON I

Summary. Ordinations and promotions made for pecuniary considerations are devoid of every dignity.

Text. Following the example of the holy fathers and recognizing the obligation of our office, we absolutely forbid in virtue of the authority of the Apostolic See that anyone be ordained or promoted for money in the Church of God. Has anyone thus secured ordination or promotion in the Church, the rank acquired shall be devoid of every dignity.

CANON 2

Summary. Only a priest may be made provost, archpriest, and dean; only a deacon may be archdeacon.

Text. No one except a priest shall be promoted to the dignity of provost, archpriest, or dean; and no one shall be made archdeacon unless he is a deacon.

CANON 3

Summary. Priests, deacons, and subdeacons are forbidden to live with women other than such as were permitted by the Nicene Council.

Text. We absolutely forbid priests, deacons, and subdeacons to associate with concubines and women, or to live with women other than such as the Nicene Council (canon 3) for reasons of necessity permitted, namely, the mother, sister, or aunt, or any such person concerning whom no suspicion could arise.

CANON 4

Summary. Lay persons, no matter how pious they may be, have no authority to dispose of anything that belongs to the Church.

Text. In accordance with the decision of Pope Stephen, we declare that lay persons, no matter how devout they may be, have no authority to dispose of anything belonging to the Church, but according to the Apostolic canon the supervision of all ecclesiastical affairs belongs to the bishop, who shall administer them conformably to the will of God. If therefore any prince or other layman shall arrogate to himself the right of disposition, control, or ownership of ecclesiastical goods or properties, let him be judged guilty of sacrilege.

CANON 5

Summary. Marriages between blood-relatives are forbidden.

Text. We forbid marriages between blood-relatives because they are forbidden by the divine and secular laws. Those who contract such alliances, as also their offspring, the divine laws not only ostracize but declare accursed, while the civil laws brand them as infamous and deprive them of hereditary rights. We, therefore, following the example of our fathers, declare and stigmatize them as infamous.

CANON 6

Summary. Ordinations by Burdinus and the bishops consecrated by him are invalid.

Text. The ordinations made by the heresiarch Burdinus after his condemnation by the Roman Church, as also those made by the bishops consecrated by him after that point of time, we declare to be invalid.

CANON 7

Summary. No one is permitted to arrogate to himself the episcopal authority in matters pertaining to the cura animarum and the bestowal of benefices.

Text. No archdeacon, archpriest, provost, or dean shall bestow on another the care of souls or the prebends of a church without the decision or consent of the bishop; indeed, as the sacred canons point out, the care of souls and the disposition of ecclesiastical property are vested in the authority of the bishop. If anyone shall dare act contrary to this and arrogate to himself the power belonging to the bishop, let him be expelled from the Church.

CANON 8

Summary. Military persons are forbidden under penalty of anathema to invade or forcibly hold the city of Benevento.

Text. Desiring with the grace of God to protect the recognized possessions of the Holy Roman Church, we forbid under pain of anathema any military person to invade or forcibly hold Benevento, the city of St. Peter. If anyone act contrary to this, let him be anathematized.

CANON 9

Summary. Those excommunicated by one bishop, may not be restored by others.

Text. We absolutely forbid that those who have been excommunicated by their own bishops be received into the communion of the Church by other bishops, abbots, and clerics.

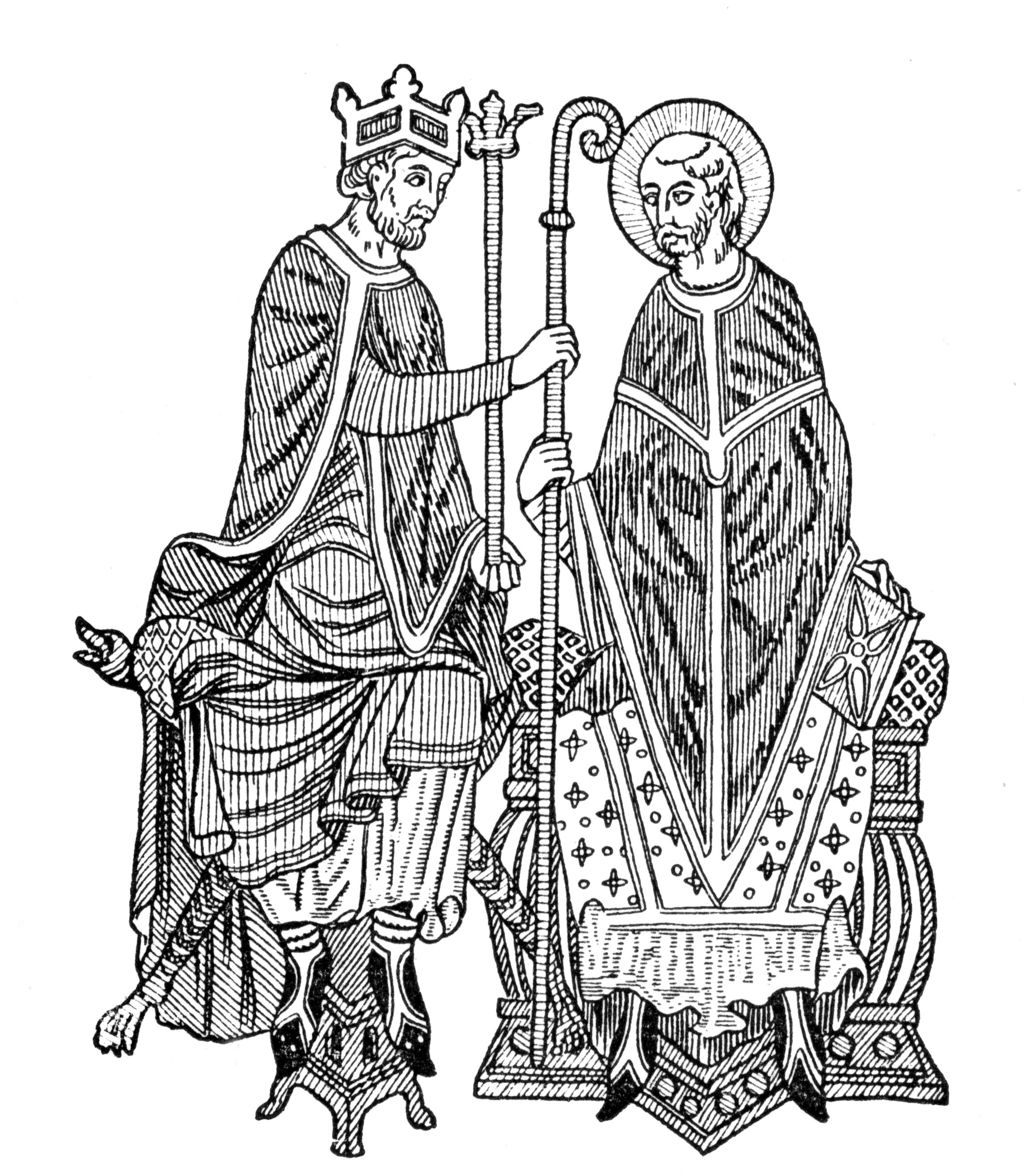
Canons 2, 4 and 10 ended the practice of the Holy Roman Emperor naming bishops and the pope.

CANON 10

Summary. A bishop consecrated after an uncanonical election shall be deposed.

Text. No one shall be consecrated bishop who has not been canonically elected. If anyone dare do this, both the consecrator and the one consecrated shall be deposed without hope of reinstatement.

CANON 11

Summary. To those who give aid to the Christians in the Orient is granted the remission of sins, and their families and possessions are taken under the protection of the Roman Church.

Text. For effectively crushing the tyranny of the infidels, we grant to those who go to Jerusalem and also to those who give aid toward the defense of the Christians, the remission of their sins and we take under the protection of St. Peter and the Roman Church their homes, their families, and all their belongings, as was already ordained by Pope Urban II. Whoever, therefore, shall dare molest or seize these during the absence of their owners, shall incur excommunication. Those, however, who with a view of going to Jerusalem or to Spain (that is, against the Moors) are known to have attached the cross to their garments and afterward removed it, we command in virtue of our Apostolic authority to replace it and begin the journey within a year from the coming Easter. Otherwise we shall excommunicate them and interdict within their territory all divine service except the baptism of infants and the administration of the last rites to the dying.

CANON 12

Summary. The property of the porticani dying without heirs is not to be disposed of in a manner contrary to the wish of the one deceased.

Text. With the advice of our brethren and of the entire Curia, as well as with the will and consent of the prefect, we decree the abolition of that evil custom which has hitherto prevailed among the porticani, namely, of disposing, contrary to the wish of the one deceased, of the property of porticani dying without heirs; with this understanding, however, that in future the porticani remain faithful to the Roman Church, to us and to our successors.

CANON 13

Summary. If anyone violates the truce of God and after the third admonition does not make satisfaction, he shall be anathematized.

Text. If anyone shall violate the truce of God he shall be admonished three times by the bishop to make satisfaction. If he disregards the third admonition the bishop, either with the advice of the metropolitan or with that of two or one of the neighboring bishops, shall pronounce the sentence of anathema against the violator and in writing denounce him to all the bishops.

CANON 14

Summary. Laymen are absolutely forbidden to remove offerings from the altars of Roman churches.

Text. Following the canons of the holy fathers, we absolutely and under penalty of anathema forbid laymen to remove the offerings from the altars of the churches of St. Peter, of The Savior (Lateran Basilica), of St. Mary Rotund, in a word, from the altars of any of the churches or from the crosses. By our Apostolic authority we forbid also the fortifying of churches and their conversion to profane uses.

CANON 15

Summary. Counterfeiters of money shall be excommunicated.

Text. Whoever manufactures or knowingly expends counterfeit money, shall be cut off from the communion of the faithful (excommunicated) as one accursed, as an oppressor of the poor and a disturber of the city.

CANON 16

Summary. Robbers of pilgrims and of merchants shall be excommunicated.

Text. If anyone shall dare attack pilgrims going to Rome to visit the shrines of the Apostles and the oratories of other saints and rob them of the things they have with them, or exact from merchants new imposts and tolls, let him be excommunicated till he has made satisfaction.

CANON 17

Summary. Abbots and monks may not have the cura animarum.

Text. We forbid abbots and monks to impose public penances, to visit the sick, to administer extreme unction, and to sing public masses. The chrism, holy oil, consecration of altars, and ordination of clerics they shall obtain from the bishops in whose dioceses they reside.

CANON 18

Summary. The appointment of priests to churches belongs to the bishops, and without their consent they may not receive tithes and churches from laymen.

Text. Priests shall be appointed to parochial churches by the bishops, to whom they shall be responsible for the care of souls and other matters pertaining to them. They are not permitted to receive tithes and churches from laics without the will and consent of the bishops. If they act otherwise, let them be subject to the canonical penalties.

CANON 19

Summary. Taxes paid to bishops by monks since Gregory VII must be continued. Monks may not by prescription acquire the possessions of churches and of bishops.

Text. The tax (servitium) which monasteries and their churches have rendered to the bishops since the time of Gregory VII, shall be continued. We absolutely forbid abbots and monks to acquire by prescription after thirty years the possessions of churches and of shops.

CANON 20

Summary. Churches and their possessions, as well as the person and things connected with them, shall remain safe and unmolested.

Text. Having in mind the example of our fathers and discharging the duty of our pastoral office, we decree that churches and their possessions, as well as the persons connected with them, namely, clerics and monks and their servants (conversi), also the laborers and the things they use, shall remain safe and unmolested. If anyone shall dare act contrary to this and, recognizing his crime, does not within the space of thirty days make proper amends, let him be cut off from the Church and anathematized.

CANON 21

Summary. Clerics in major orders may not marry, and marriages already contracted must be dissolved.

Text. We absolutely forbid priests, deacons, subdeacons, and monks to have concubines or to contract marriage. We decree in accordance with the definitions of the sacred canons, that marriages already contracted by such persons must be dissolved, and that the persons be condemned to do penance.

CANON 22

Summary. The alienation of possessions of the exarchate of Ravenna is condemned, and the Ordinaries made by the intruders are invalid.

Text. The alienation that has been made especially by Otto, Guido, Jerome, and perhaps by Philip of possessions of the exarchate of Ravenna, we condemn. In a general way we declare invalid the alienations in whatever manner made by bishops and abbots whether intruded or canonically elected, and also the ordinations conferred by them whether with the consent of the clergy of the Church or simoniacally. We also absolutely forbid any cleric in any way to alienate his prebend or any ecclesiastical benefice. If he has presumed to do this in the past or shall presume to do so in the future, his action shall be null and he shall be subject to the canonical penalties.

== Results of the council ==
Lateran I was the first of four Lateran Councils between the years 1123–1215. The first was not very original in its concept, nor one called to meet a pressing theological question. For the most part, Pope Callixtus II summoned the council to ratify the various meetings and concords which had been occurring in and around Rome for several years. The most pressing issue was that of the Investiture Controversy which had consumed nearly a century of contention and open warfare. At the heart of the question was the ancient right of the Holy Roman Emperor to name the pope as well as bishops and priests. These would be invested with some secular symbol such as a sword or scepter and the spiritual authority represented by a ring, miter and crosier. To an illiterate population, it appeared the bishop or abbot was now the king's inferior and owed his position to the king. This issue came to the fore in the first part of the eleventh century when Rome and the pope sought autonomy from the Holy Roman Emperor. It had been a central issue in the reign of Pope Gregory VII and his battles with Henry IV, Holy Roman Emperor. The issue was never settled. Years of teaching by Roman trained priests and bishops in Germany had led to an educated generation which rejected the idea of divine right of kings.

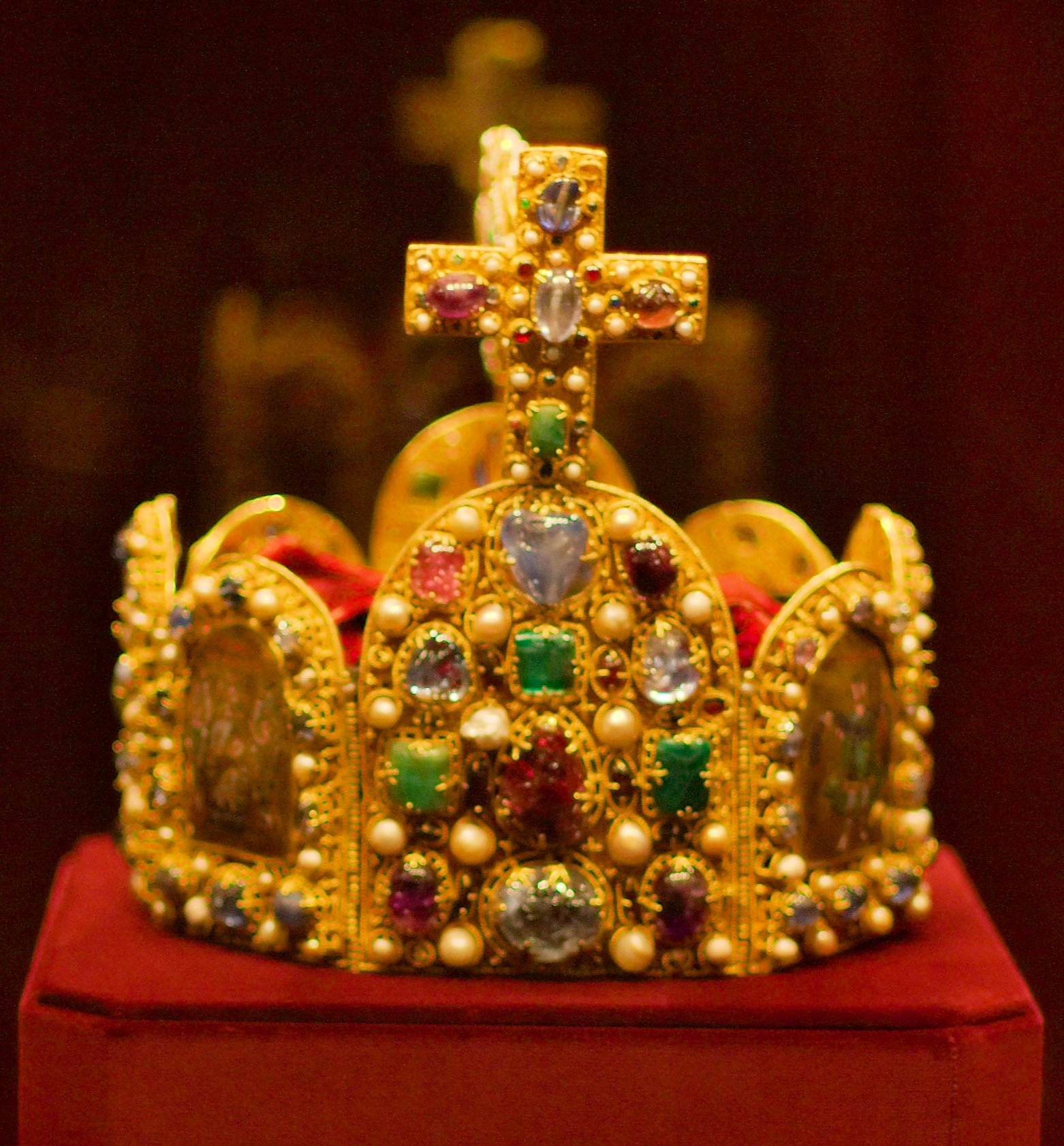
Henry V, Holy Roman Emperor died leaving his kingdom in a much weakened condition.

The Third Lateran Council and the Fourth Lateran Council are generally considered to be of much greater significance than Lateran I. However, Lateran I marked the first time a general and large Council had been held in the West. All previous Councils had been in the East and dominated by Greek theologians and philosophers. In the struggle between Stephen of England and Matilda, the daughter of Henry I of England, the English Church slipped away from the close control the Normans had exercised. Stephen was forced to make many concessions to the Church to gain some element of political control. Historians have largely considered his rule to be a disaster, calling it The Anarchy.

Because of political necessity, the Holy Roman Emperors were restrained from directly naming bishops in the kingdom. In practicality, the process continued to a certain extent. The issue of separation of church and state was simply recast in a different direction. Of all the Gregorian Reforms which were embodied by Lateran I, celibacy of the clergy was the most successful. Simony was curtailed. As time progressed, secular interference into the politics of the Church was seen to continue, albeit in different ways from that of the Investiture Controversy.

It has been argued by some historians that the Concordat of Worms and its reiteration by Lateran I were little more than face saving measures by the Church. Henry V, Holy Roman Emperor continued to name bishops within his kingdom. His control over the papacy was definitely abated. At the time, the Concordat of Worms was proclaimed as a great victory for Henry V inside the Holy Roman Empire. It did serve to constrain much of the most recent warfare in and outside the empire. In the end, Henry V died the monarch of a much diminished kingdom.

== See also ==
- Concordat of Worms
- Charter of Liberties
