= Bernard of Clairvaux =

Burgundian saint, abbot and theologian (1090–1153)

Saint Bernard of Clairvaux O. Cist.
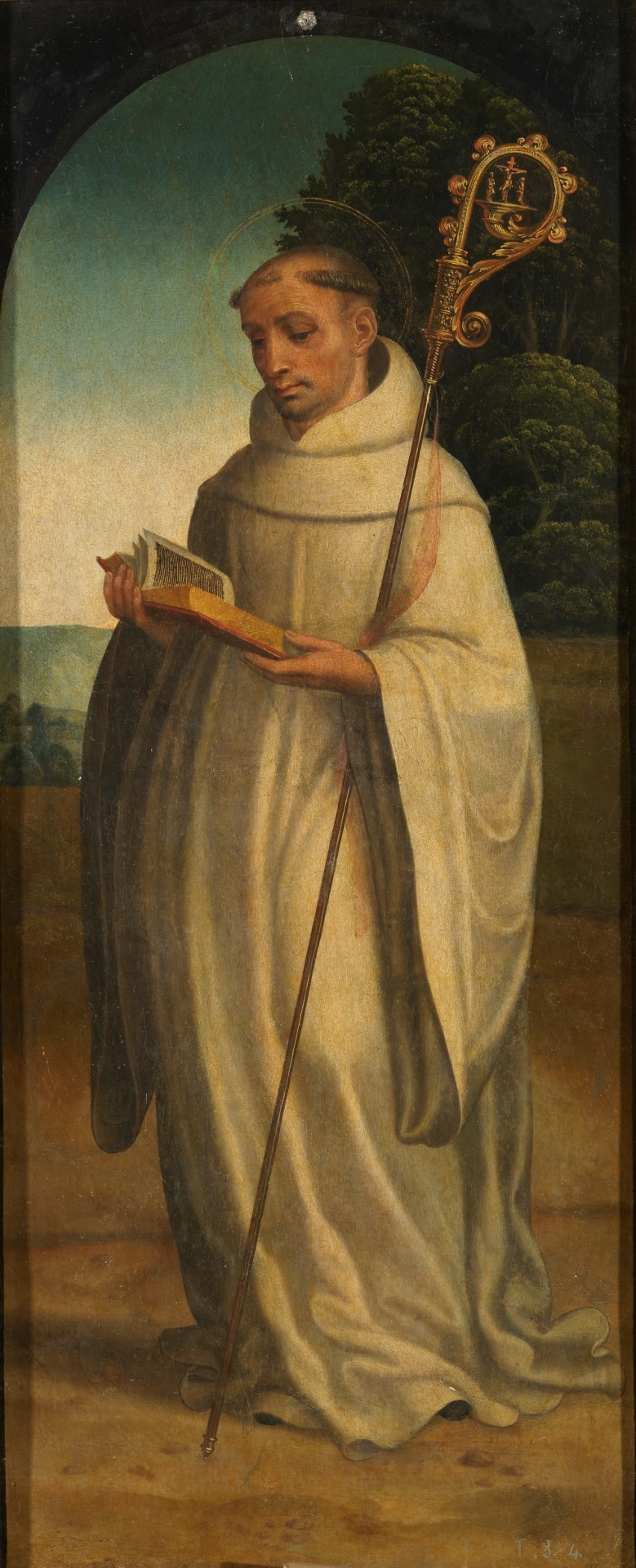
- San Bernardo by Juan Correa de Vivar, held in the Museo del Prado, Madrid, Spain

Doctor of the Church; Doctor Mellifluus; Last of the Fathers; Confessor; Abbot
- Born: c. 1090; Fontaine-lès-Dijon, Burgundy, Kingdom of France
- Died: 20 August 1153 (aged 62–63); Clairvaux Abbey, Clairvaux, Champagne, Kingdom of France
- Venerated in: Catholic Church; Anglican Communion; Lutheranism
- Canonized: 18 January 1174, Rome, Papal States, by Pope Alexander III
- Major shrine: Troyes Cathedral
- Feast: 20 August
- Attributes: Cistercian habit; book; crosier
- Patronage: Cistercians; Burgundy; Beekeeper; Candlemaker; Gibraltar; Algeciras; Queens' College, Cambridge; Speyer Cathedral; Knights Templar; Binangonan, Rizal

Bernard of Clairvaux (Latin: Bernardus Claraevallensis; 1090 – 20 August 1153), venerated as Saint Bernard, was an abbot, mystic, co-founder of the Knights Templar, (Note: André de Montbard, one of the founders of the Knights Templar, was a half-brother of Bernard's mother.) and a major leader in the reform of the Benedictines through the nascent Cistercian Order.

Bernard was sent to found Clairvaux Abbey only a few years after becoming a monk at Cîteaux. In 1128, Bernard attended the Council of Troyes, at which he traced the outlines of the Rule of the Knights Templar, which soon became an ideal of Christian nobility.

On the death of Pope Honorius II in 1130, a schism arose in the church. Bernard was a major proponent of Pope Innocent II, arguing effectively for his legitimacy over the Antipope Anacletus II.

The abbot advocated crusades in general and convinced many to participate in the unsuccessful Second Crusade, notably through a famous sermon at Vézelay (1146).

Bernard was canonized just 21 years after his death by Pope Alexander III. In 1830, Pope Pius VIII declared him a Doctor of the Church.

== Early life (1090–1113) ==
Bernard's parents were Tescelin de Fontaine, lord of Fontaine-lès-Dijon, and Alèthe de Montbard, both members of the highest nobility of Burgundy. Bernard was the third of seven children, six of whom were sons. Aged nine, he was sent to a school at Châtillon-sur-Seine run by the secular canons of Saint-Vorles. Bernard was interested in literature and rhetoric.

Bernard's mother died when he was a youth. During his education with priests, he often thought of becoming one. In 1098, a group led by Robert of Molesme founded Cîteaux Abbey, near Dijon, to live according to a literal interpretation of the Rule of St. Benedict. They established new administrative structures among their monasteries, effectively creating a new order, known, after the first abbey, as the Order of Cistercians. After his mother died, Bernard decided to go to Cîteaux. In 1113, he and thirty other young noblemen of Burgundy, many of whom were his relatives, sought and gained admission to the new monastery. Bernard's example was so convincing that scores (among them his own father) followed him into the monastic life. As a result, he is considered the patron of religious vocations.

== Abbot of Clairvaux ==
Bernard exorcising a possession, altarpiece by Jörg Breu the Elder, c. 1500

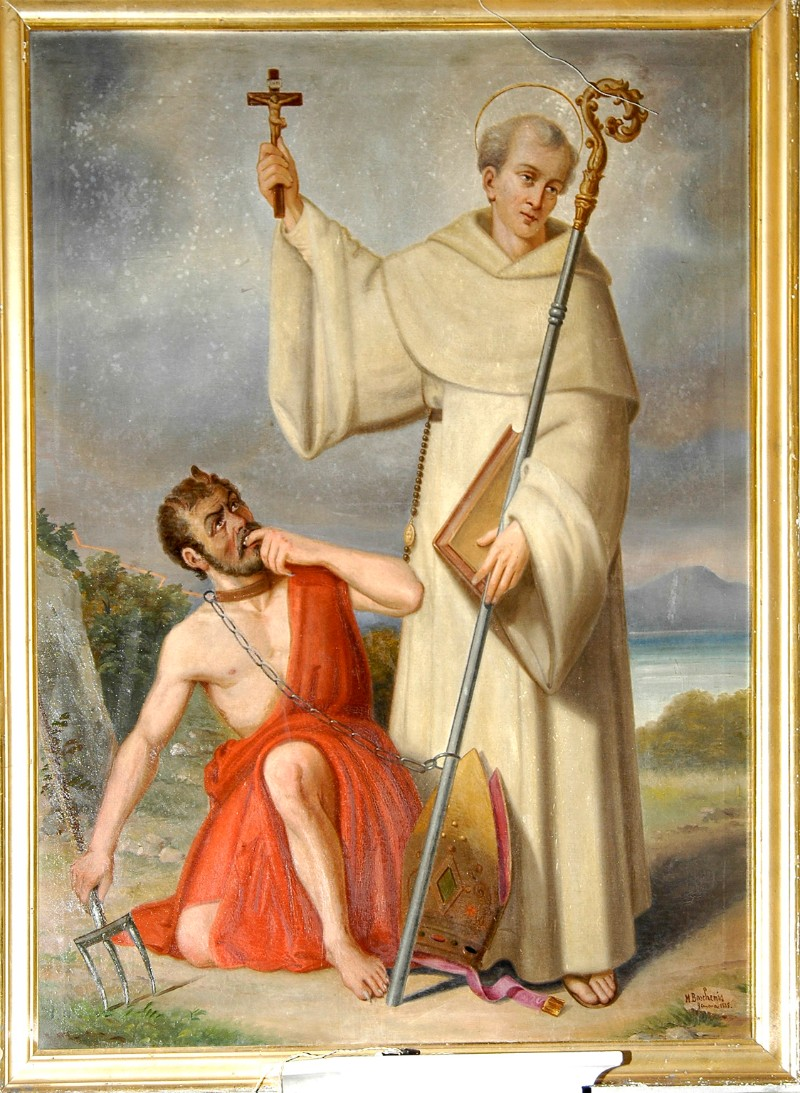
Bernard holding a demon at his feet, oil on canvas by Marcello Baschenis, c. 1885

The little community of reformed Benedictines at Cîteaux grew rapidly. Three years after entering, Bernard was sent with a group of twelve monks to found a new house at Vallée d'Absinthe, in the Diocese of Langres. This Bernard named Claire Vallée, or Clairvaux, on 25 June 1115, and the names of Bernard and Clairvaux soon became inseparable. Bernard was made abbot by William of Champeaux, Bishop of Châlons-sur-Marne. From then on, a strong friendship grew between the abbot and the bishop, who was professor of theology at Notre Dame of Paris and the founder of St. Victor Abbey in Paris.

The beginnings of Clairvaux Abbey were austere, and Bernard even more so. He had often been ill since his noviciate, due to extreme fasting. Nonetheless, candidates for the monastic life flocked to him in great numbers. Clairvaux soon started founding new communities. In 1118 Trois-Fontaines Abbey was founded in the diocese of Châlons; in 1119 Fontenay Abbey in the Diocese of Autun; and in 1121 Foigny Abbey near Vervins. In Bernard's lifetime, more than sixty abbeys followed, though some were not new foundations but transferrals to the Cistercians.

Bernard spent extended time outside of the abbey as a preacher and a diplomat in the service of the pope. Described by Jean-Baptiste Chautard as "the most contemplative and yet at the same time the most active man of his age", Bernard described the disparate parts of his personality when he called himself the "chimera of his age".

In addition to successes, Bernard also had his trials. Once, when he was absent from Clairvaux, the prior of the rival Abbey of Cluny went to Clairvaux and convinced Bernard's cousin, Robert of Châtillon, to become a Benedictine. This was the occasion of the longest and most emotional of Bernard's letters. When his brother Gerard died, Bernard was devastated, and his deep mourning was the inspiration for one of his most moving sermons.

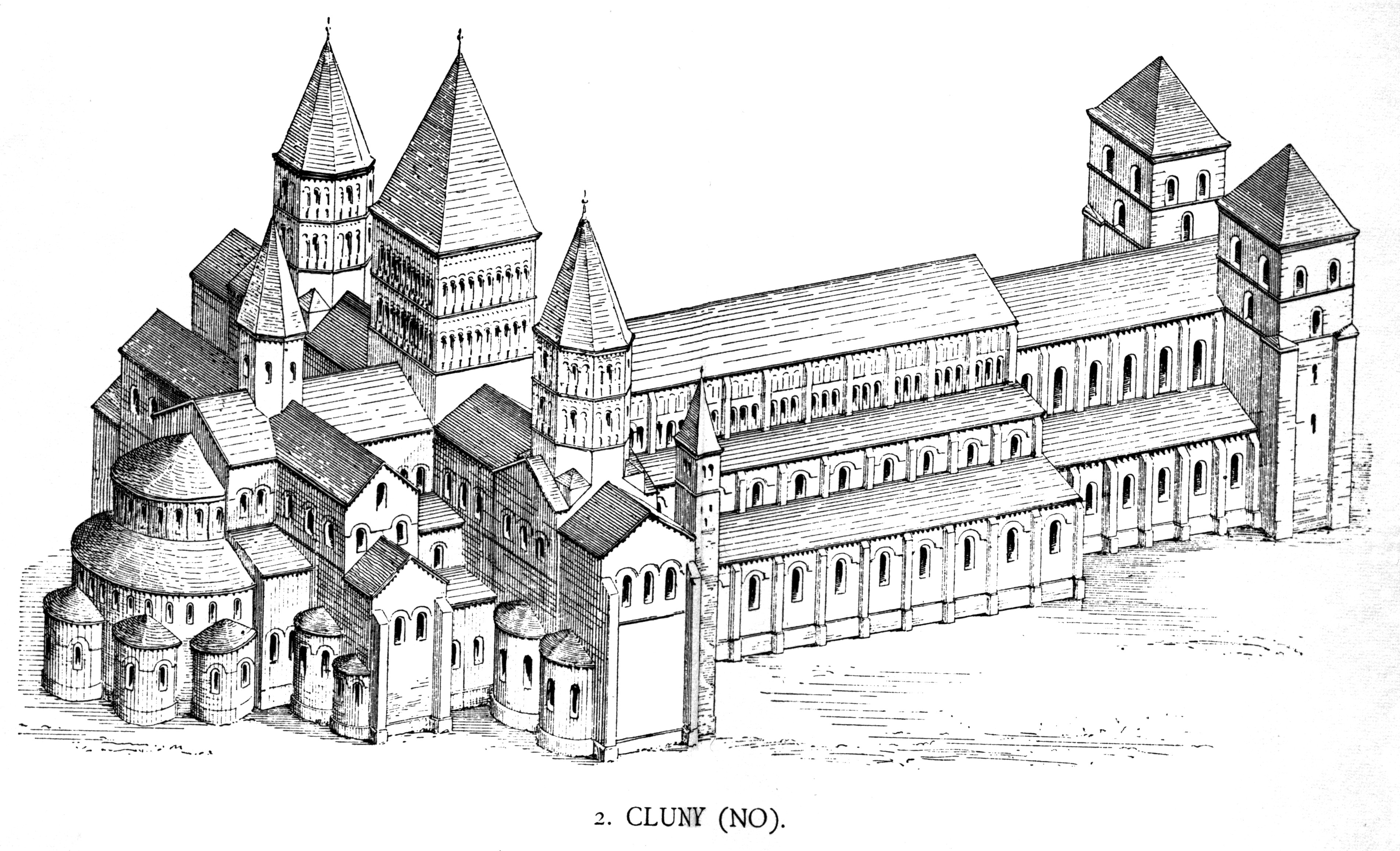
The abbey of Cluny as it would have looked in Bernard's time

The Cluny Benedictines were unhappy to see Cîteaux gain such prominence so quickly, particularly since many Benedictines were becoming Cistercians. They criticized the Cistercian way of life. At the solicitation of William of St.-Thierry, Bernard defended the Cistercians with his Apology. Peter the Venerable, abbot of Cluny, answered Bernard and assured him of his admiration and friendship. In the meantime, Cluny launched a reform and Bernard befriended Abbot Suger.

== Doctor of the Church ==
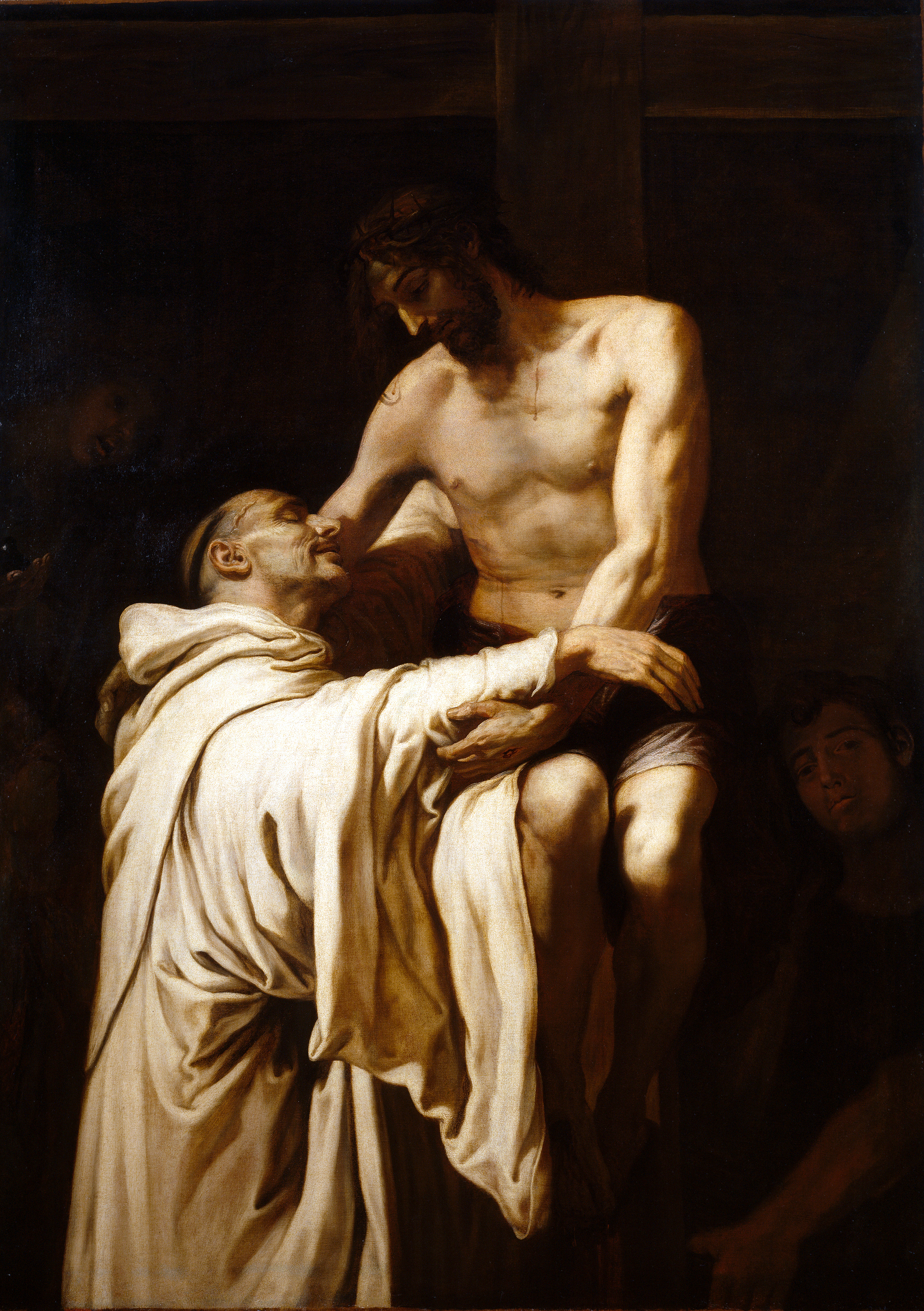
Christ Embracing St. Bernard by Francisco Ribalta

Although acknowledged as "a difficult saint", Bernard has remained influential in the centuries since his death and was named a Doctor of the Church in 1830. In 1953, on the 800th anniversary of his death, Pope Pius XII devoted the encyclical Doctor Mellifluus to him. He labeled the abbot "the last of the Fathers".

In opposition to the rational approach to understanding God used by the scholastics, Bernard preached poetically, using appeals to emotion and conversion to foster a more immediate experience of faith. He is considered to be a master of Christian rhetoric: "His use of language remains perhaps his most universal legacy." He contributed lyrics to the Cistercian Hymnal.

As a master of prayer, the abbot emphasized the value of personal, experiential friendship with Christ.

=== Mariology ===
As a mariologist, Bernard was not original but exceptionally effective at spreading devotion to Jesus' mother, since his preaching attracted a large audience. He emphasized Mary's humility and insisted on her central role in Christian theology. He developed the theology of her role as Co-Redemptrix and mediator. He famously called Mary an "aquaeduct of grace". Dante has Bernard speak a profound Marian prayer at the beginning of the thirty-third canto of the Paradiso. In Goethe's Faust, Bernard appears as a "Doctor Marianus", a committed devoté of the Virgin Mary.

=== Schism ===
Bernard made a self-confident impression and had an undeniable charisma in the eyes of his contemporaries; the historian Holdsworth wrote that "his first and greatest miracle was himself". He defended the rights of the church against the encroachments of kings and princes, and recalled to their duty Henri Sanglier, archbishop of Sens and Stephen of Senlis, bishop of Paris. When Honorius II died in 1130, a schism broke out in the Church by the election of two popes, Pope Innocent II and Antipope Anacletus II. Innocent, having been banished from Rome by Anacletus, took refuge in France. King Louis VI convened a national council of the French bishops at Étampes, and Bernard, summoned there by the bishops, was chosen to judge between the rival popes. He decided in favour of Innocent.

Bernard travelled on to Italy and reconciled Pisa with Genoa, and Milan with the pope. The same year Bernard was again at the Council of Reims at the side of Innocent II. He then went to Aquitaine, where he succeeded for the time in detaching William X, Duke of Aquitaine from the cause of Anacletus.

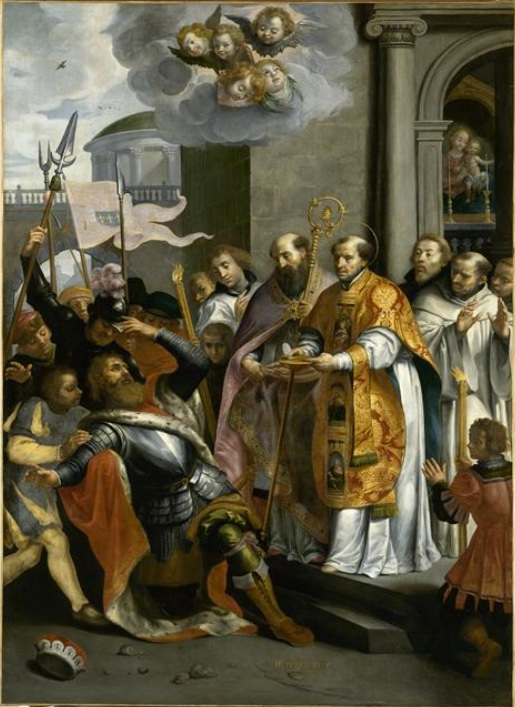
Saint Bernard and the Duke of Aquitaine, by Marten Pepijn

Germany had decided to support Innocent through Norbert of Xanten, who was a friend of Bernard's. Pope Innocent, however, insisted on Bernard's company when he met with Lothair II, Holy Roman Emperor. Lothair II became Innocent's strongest ally among the nobility. Although the councils of Étampes, Würzburg, Clermont, and Rheims all supported Innocent, large portions of the Christian world still supported Anacletus.

In a letter by Bernard to German Emperor Lothair regarding Antipope Anacletus, Bernard wrote, "It is a disgrace for Christ that a Jew sits on the throne of St. Peter's" and "Anacletus has not even a good reputation with his friends, while Innocent is illustrious beyond all doubt." (One of Anacletus' great-great-grandparents, Benedictus, maybe Baruch in Hebrew, was a Jew who had converted to Christianity – but Anacletus himself was not a Jew, and his family had been Christians for three generations.)

Bernard wrote to Gerard of Angoulême (a letter known as Letter 126), which questioned Gerard's reasons for supporting Anacletus. Bernard later commented that Gerard was his most formidable opponent during the whole schism. After persuading Gerard, Bernard travelled to visit William X, Duke of Aquitaine. He was the hardest for Bernard to convince. He did not pledge allegiance to Innocent until 1135. After that, Bernard spent most of his time in Italy persuading the Italians to pledge allegiance to Innocent.

In 1132, Bernard accompanied Innocent II into Italy, and at Cluny, the pope abolished the dues that Clairvaux had paid to that abbey. This action gave rise to a quarrel between the White Monks and the Black Monks, which lasted 20 years. In May of that year, the pope, supported by the army of Lothair III, entered Rome, but Lothair III, feeling himself too weak to resist the partisans of Anacletus, retired beyond the Alps, and Innocent sought refuge in Pisa in September 1133. Bernard had returned to France in June and was continuing the work of peacemaking which he had commenced in 1130.

Towards the end of 1134, he made a second journey into Aquitaine, where William X had relapsed into schism. Bernard invited William to the Mass, which he celebrated in the Church of La Coudre. At the Eucharist, he "admonished the Duke not to despise God as he did His servants". William yielded, and the schism ended.

Bernard went again to Italy, where Roger II of Sicily was endeavouring to withdraw the Pisans from their allegiance to Innocent. He recalled the city of Milan's obedience to the pope, as they had followed the deposed Anselm V, Archbishop of Milan. For this, he was offered, and he refused, the see of Milan. He then returned to Clairvaux. Believing himself at last secure in his cloister, Bernard devoted himself to the composition of the works which won him the title of "Doctor of the Church". He wrote his sermons on the Song of Songs at this time. (Note: Other mystics such as John of the Cross also found their language and symbols in Song of Songs.)

In 1137, he was again forced to leave the abbey by order of the pope to put an end to the quarrel between Lothair and Roger of Sicily. At the conference in Palermo, Bernard convinced Roger of Innocent II's rights. He also silenced the final supporters who sustained the schism. Anacletus died of "grief and disappointment" in 1138, and with him, the schism ended.

In 1139, Bernard assisted at the Second Council of the Lateran, in which the surviving adherents of the schism were definitively condemned. About the same time, Bernard was visited at Clairvaux by Malachy, Primate of All Ireland, and a very close friendship formed between them. Malachy wanted to become a Cistercian, but the pope would not give his permission. Malachy died at Clairvaux in 1148.

=== Conflict with Abelard ===
Towards the close of the 11th century, a spirit of independence flourished within schools of philosophy and theology. The movement found an ardent and powerful advocate in Peter Abelard. Abelard's treatise on the Trinity had been condemned as heretical in 1121, and he was compelled to throw his own book into a fire. However, Abelard continued to develop his controversial teachings. Bernard is said to have held a meeting with Abelard, intending to persuade him to amend his writings, during which Abelard repented and promised to do so. But once out of Bernard's presence, he reneged.

Bernard then denounced Abelard to the pope and cardinals of the Curia. Abelard sought a debate with Bernard, but Bernard initially declined, saying that matters of such importance should not be settled by logical analysis. Bernard's letters to William of St-Thierry also express his apprehension about confronting the preeminent logician. Abelard continued to press for a public debate and publicized his challenge, making it hard for Bernard to decline. In 1141, at the urgings of Abelard, the archbishop of Sens called a council of bishops, where Abelard and Bernard were to put their respective cases so Abelard would have a chance to clear his name.

Bernard lobbied the prelates on the evening before the debate, swaying many of them to his view. The next day, after Bernard made his opening statement, Abelard decided to retire without attempting to answer. The council found in favour of Bernard, and the pope confirmed their judgment. Abelard submitted without resistance, and he retired to Cluny to live under the protection of Peter the Venerable, where he died in 1142.

=== The challenge of heresy ===
Bernard had occupied himself in sending bands of monks from his overcrowded monastery into Germany, Sweden, England, Ireland, Portugal, Switzerland, and Italy. Some of these, at the command of Innocent II, took possession of Tre Fontane Abbey, from which Eugene III was chosen in 1145. Pope Innocent II died in the year 1143. His two successors, Pope Celestine II and Pope Lucius II, reigned only a short time, and then Bernard saw one of his disciples, Bernard of Pisa, known thereafter as Eugene III, raised to the Chair of Saint Peter. Bernard sent him, at the pope's own request, various instructions which comprise the often-quoted De consideratione. Its main argument is that church reform ought to start with the pope. Temporal matters are merely accessories; Bernard insists that piety and meditation were to precede action.

Having previously helped end the schism within the Church, Bernard was now called upon to combat heresy. Henry of Lausanne, a former Cluniac monk, had adopted the teachings of the Petrobrusians, followers of Peter of Bruys, and spread them in a modified form after Peter's death. Henry of Lausanne's followers became known as Henricians. In June 1145, at the invitation of Cardinal Alberic of Ostia, Bernard travelled in southern France. His preaching, aided by his ascetic looks and simple attire, helped doom the new sects. Both the Henrician and the Petrobrusian faiths began to die out by the end of that year. Soon afterwards, Henry of Lausanne was arrested, brought before the bishop of Toulouse, and probably imprisoned for life. In a letter to the people of Toulouse, undoubtedly written at the end of 1146, Bernard calls upon them to extirpate the last remnants of the heresy. He also preached against Catharism. Before the second hearing of Gilbert of Poitiers at the Council of Reims 1148, Bernard held a private meeting with a number of the attendees, attempting to pressure them to condemn Gilbert. This offended the cardinals in attendance, who insisted that they were the only ones who could judge the case, and no verdict of heresy was rendered against Gilbert.

== Monastic and clerical preaching ==
As abbot, Bernard often addressed his community, but he also spoke to other monastics and, in one particularly famous case, to theology students in Paris. He gave the sermon Ad clericos de conversione (to clerics on conversion) in 1139 or early 1140, to a group of scholars and student clerics. His many sermons on the Song of Songs belong to the often-studied sermons he addressed to the monks at Clairvaux.

== Crusade preaching ==
=== Second Crusade (1146–1149) ===
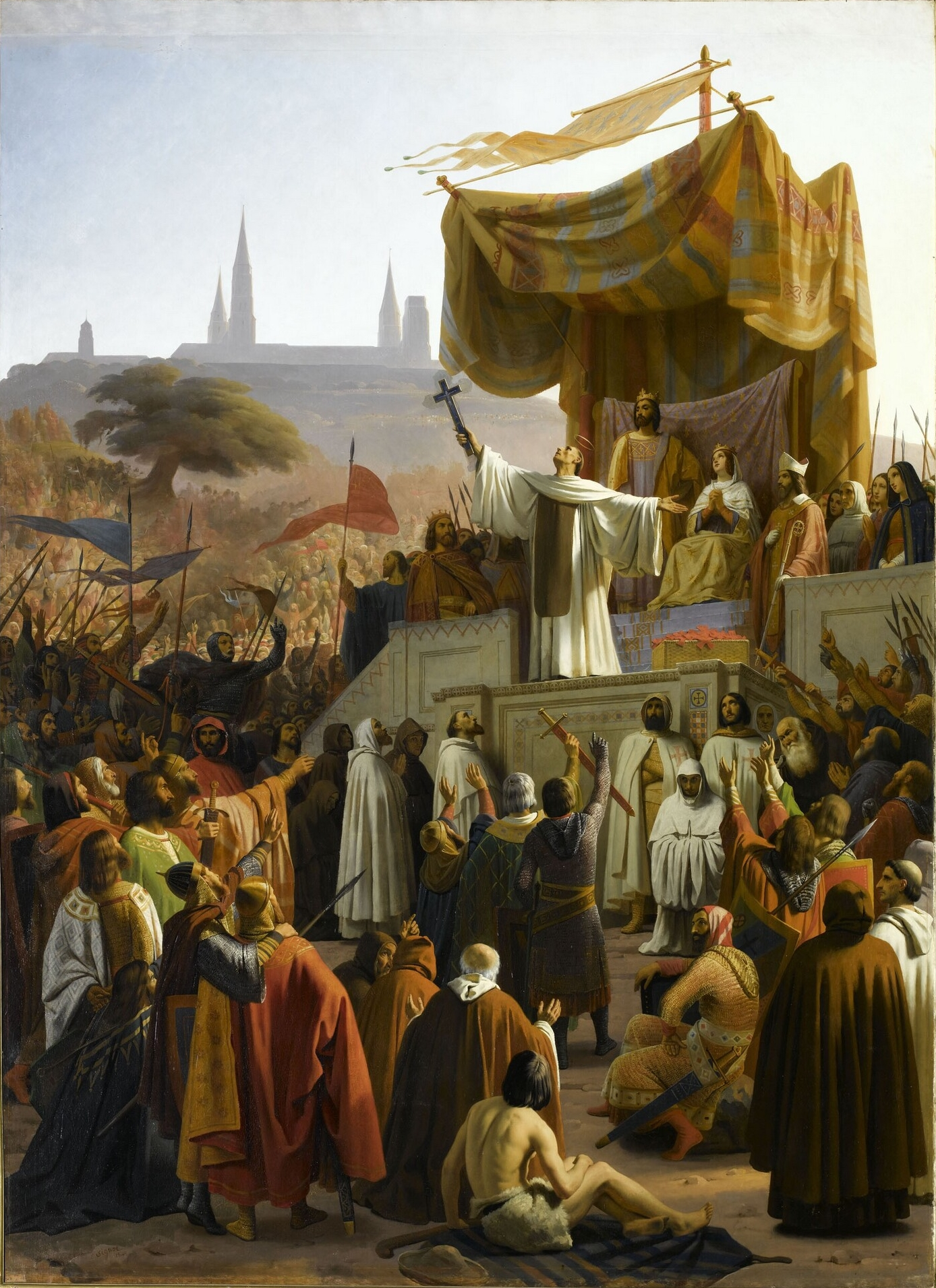
Saint Bernard preaching the second crusade in Vézelay in 1146

News came at this time from the Holy Land that alarmed Christendom. Christians had been defeated at the Siege of Edessa, and most of the county had fallen into the hands of the Seljuk Turks. The Kingdom of Jerusalem and the other Crusader states were threatened with similar disaster. Deputations of the bishops of Armenia solicited aid from the pope, and the King of France also sent ambassadors. In 1144 Eugene III commissioned Bernard to preach the Second Crusade and granted the same indulgences for it which Pope Urban II had accorded to the First Crusade.

There was, at first, virtually no popular enthusiasm for the crusade, as there had been in 1095. Bernard found it expedient to dwell upon taking the cross as a potent means of gaining absolution for sin and attaining grace. On 31 March, with King Louis VII of France present, he preached to an enormous crowd in a field at Vézelay, making "the speech of his life". When he had finished, many of his listeners enlisted; they supposedly ran out of the cloth used to make crosses for the recruits.

Unlike the First Crusade, the new venture attracted royalty, such as the French queen Eleanor of Aquitaine and scores of high aristocrats and bishops. But an even greater show of support came from the common people. Bernard wrote Pope Eugene a few days afterwards, "Cities and castles are now empty. There is not one man left to seven women, and everywhere there are widows to still-living husbands."

Bernard then passed into Germany, with reported miracles contributing to the success of his mission. King Conrad III of Germany and his nephew Frederick Barbarossa received the cross from the hand of Bernard. Pope Eugenius came in person to France to encourage the enterprise. As in the First Crusade, the preaching led to attacks on Jews; a fanatical French monk named Radulf was apparently inspiring massacres of Jews in the Rhineland, Cologne, Mainz, Worms, and Speyer, with Radulf claiming Jews were not contributing financially to the rescue of the Holy Land. The archbishop of Cologne and the archbishop of Mainz were vehemently opposed to these attacks and asked Bernard to denounce them. He did so, but when the campaign continued, Bernard travelled from Flanders to Germany to address the problems in person. He then found Radulf in Mainz and was able to silence him, returning him to his monastery.

The last years of Bernard's life were saddened by the failure of the Second Crusade he had preached and by the entire responsibility that was thrown upon him. Bernard sent an apology to the Pope, and it is included in the second part of his "Book of Considerations". There, he explains that the sins of the crusaders caused their misfortune and failure.

=== Wendish Crusade (1147) ===
Bernard did not actually preach the Wendish Crusade. Still, he did write a letter advocating subduing this group of Western Slavs so they would not be an obstacle to the Second Crusade. He was for battling them "until such a time as, by God's help, they shall either be converted or deleted". A decree issued in Frankfurt stated that the letter should be proclaimed widely and read aloud, so that "the letter functioned as a sermon."

== Final years (1149–1153) ==
The death of his contemporaries served as a warning to Bernard of his own approaching end. The first to die was Suger in 1152, of whom Bernard wrote to Eugene III, "If there is any precious vase adorning the palace of the King of Kings, it is the soul of the venerable Suger." Conrad III and his son Henry died the same year. Bernard died at age sixty-three on 20 August 1153, after forty years of monastic life. He was buried at Clairvaux Abbey. After his remains were destroyed in 1792 by the French Revolutionary government, they were transferred to Troyes Cathedral.

== Legacy ==
Bernard helped found 163 monasteries across Europe. Cistercians honour him as one of the greatest early Cistercians. His feast day is 20 August.

Bernard is Dante Alighieri's last guide, in Divine Comedy, as he travels through the Empyrean.

Bernard introduced a major shift, a "fundamental reorientation" into medieval theology.

The Couvent et Basilique Saint-Bernard, a collection of buildings dating from the 12th, 17th, and 19th centuries, is dedicated to Bernard and stands in his birthplace of Fontaine-lès-Dijon. Countless churches and chapels have St. Bernard as their patron saint.

== Works ==
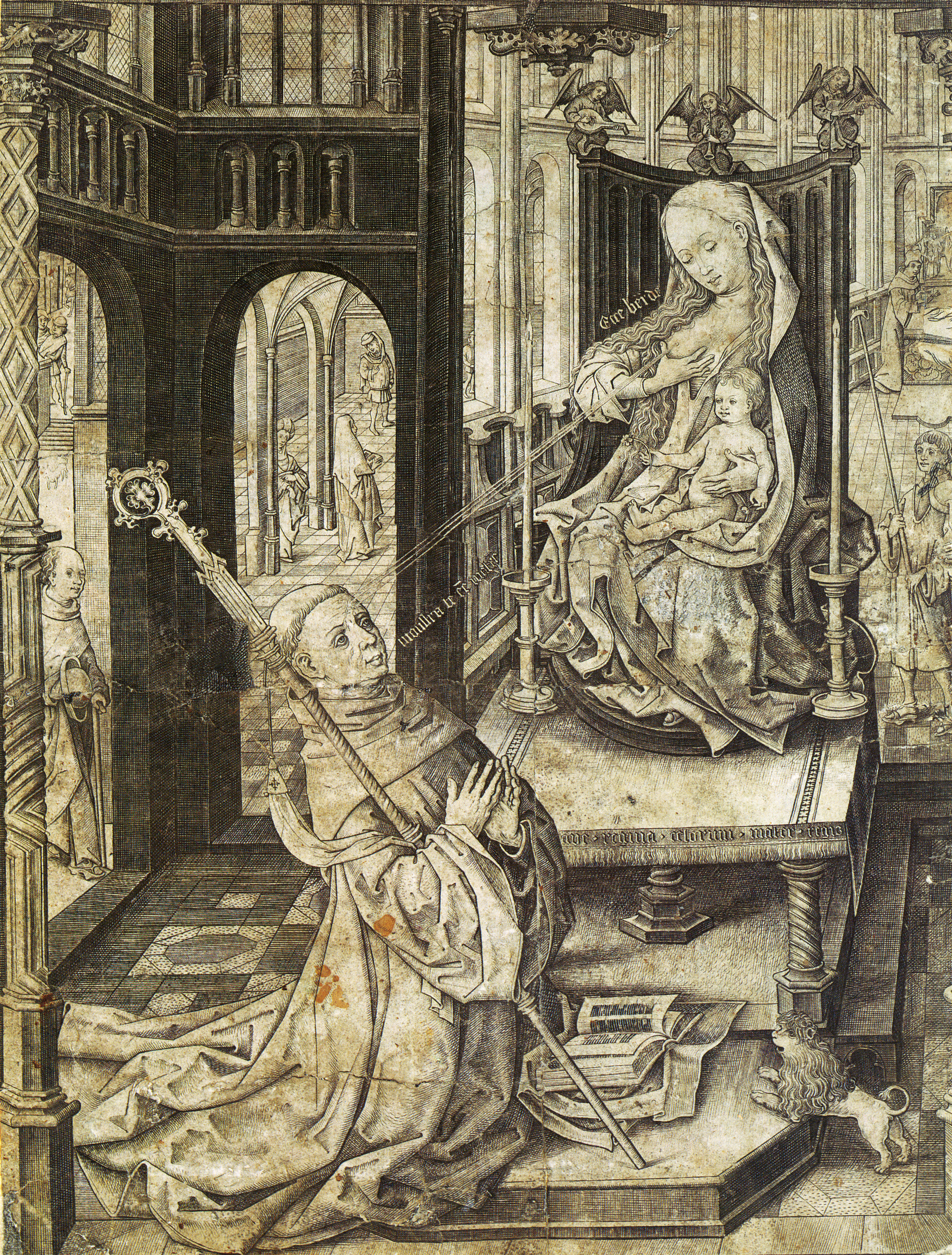
A 15th-century engraving of the Lactation of Saint Bernard by the Master I. A. M. of Zwolle

The modern critical edition is Sancti Bernardi opera (1957–1977), edited by Jean Leclercq. (Note: For a research guide see McGuire (2013).)

Bernard's works include:

- De gradibus humilitatis et superbiae [The steps of humility and pride] (in Latin). c. 1120.
- Apologia ad Guillelmum Sancti Theoderici Abbatem [Apology to William of St. Thierry] (in Latin). Written in the defence of the Cistercians against the claims of the monks of Cluny.
- De conversione ad clericos sermo seu liber [On the conversion of clerics] (in Latin). 1122.
- De gratia et libero arbitrio [On grace and free choice] (in Latin). c. 1128..
- De diligendo Deo [On loving God] (in Latin).
- Liber ad milites templi de laude novae militiae [In Praise of the new knighthood] (in Latin). 1129.
- De praecepto et dispensatione libri [Book of precepts and dispensations] (in Latin). c. 1144.
- De consideratione [On consideration] (in Latin). c. 1150. Addressed to Pope Eugene III.
- Liber De vita et rebus gestis Sancti Malachiae Hiberniae Episcopi [The life and death of Saint Malachy, bishop of Ireland] (in Latin).
- De moribus et officio episcoporum (in Latin). A letter to Henri Sanglier, Archbishop of Sens, on the duties of bishops. (Note: Ep. 42 (PL, 182, cols. 807–834a).)

His sermons are also numerous:

- Most famous are his Sermones super Cantica Canticorum (Sermons on the Song of Songs). They may have found their origins in sermons preached to the monks of Clairvaux, but theories differ. (Note: For a history of the debate over the Sermons, and an attempted solution, see Leclercq, Jean. Introduction. In Walsh (1976), pp. vii–xxx.) These sermons contain an autobiographical passage, sermon 26, mourning the death of his brother, Gerard. After Bernard died, the English Cistercian Gilbert of Hoyland continued Bernard's incomplete series of 86 sermons on the biblical Song of Songs.
- There are 125 surviving Sermones per annum (Sermons on the Liturgical Year).
- There are also Sermones de diversis (Sermons on Different Topics).

Five hundred and forty-seven letters survive.

=== Misattributions ===
Numerous letters, treatises, and other works were falsely attributed to him. These include:

- pseudo-Bernard (pseud. of Guigo I) (c. 1150). L'échelle du cloître [The scale of the cloister] (letter) (in French).
- pseudo-Bernard. Meditatio [Meditations] (in Latin). This was probably written at some point in the thirteenth century. It circulated extensively in the Middle Ages under Bernard's name and was one of the most popular religious works of the later Middle Ages. Its theme is self-knowledge as the beginning of wisdom; it begins with the phrase "Many know much, but do not know themselves".
- pseudo-Bernard. L'édification de la maison intérieure (in French).
- The Memorare.
- The hymn Jesu dulcis memoria.
- L'enfer est plein de bonnes volontés ou désirs [hell is full of good intentions and wills]. Francis de Sales, in a letter to Madame de Chantal in 1604. No works have been found with this proverb.

=== Translations ===
- On consideration, translated by George Lewis (Oxford, 1908)
- Select treatises of S. Bernard of Clairvaux: De diligendo Deo & De gradibus humilitatis et superbiae (Cambridge University Press, 1926)
- On loving God, and selections from sermons, edited by Hugh Martin, (London: SCM Press, 1959; reprinted as Westport, Connecticut: Greenwood Press, 1981)
- Cistercians and Cluniacs: St. Bernard's Apologia to Abbot William, translated by Michael Casey. Cistercian Fathers series no. 1 (Kalamazoo, Michigan: Cistercian Publications, 1970)
- The works of Bernard of Clairvaux. Vol.1, Treatises, 1, edited by M. Basil Pennington. Cistercian Fathers Series, no. 1 (Spencer, Massachusetts: Cistercian Publications, 1970). Contains the treatises Apologia to Abbot William and On Precept and Dispensation, and two shorter liturgical treatises.
- Bernard of Clairvaux, On the Song of Songs, 4 vols, Cistercian Fathers series nos 4, 7, 31, 40, (Spencer, Massachusetts: Cistercian Publications, 1971–1980)
- Letter of Saint Bernard of Clairvaux on revision of Cistercian chant = Epistola S[ancti] Bernardi de revisione cantus Cisterciensis, edited and translated by Francis J. Guentner (American Institute of Musicology, 1974)
- Treatises II: The steps of humility and pride on loving God, Cistercian Fathers series no. 13 (Washington: Cistercian Publications, 1984)
- Five books on consideration: advice to a Pope, translated by John D. Anderson & Elizabeth T. Kennan. Cistercian Fathers Series no. 37. (Kalamazoo, Michigan: Cistercian Publications, 1976)
- The Works of Bernard of Clairvaux. Volume Seven, Treatises III: On Grace and free choice. In praise of the new knighthood, translated by Conrad Greenia. Cistercian Fathers Series no. 19, (Kalamazoo, Michigan: Cistercian Publications, 1977)
- The life and death of Saint Malachy, the Irishman translated and annotated by Robert T. Meyer, (Kalamazoo, Michigan: Cistercian Publications, 1978)
- Bernard of Clairvaux, Homiliae in laudibus Virginis Matris, in Magnificat: homilies in praise of the Blessed Virgin Mary translated by Marie-Bernard Saïd and Grace Perigo, Cistercian Fathers Series no. 18, (Kalamazoo, Michigan: Cistercian Publications, 1979)
- Sermons on Conversion: on conversion, a sermon to clerics and Lenten sermons on the psalm "He Who Dwells", Cistercian Fathers Series no. 25 (Kalamazoo, Michigan: Cistercian Publications, 1981)
- Bernard of Clairvaux, Song of Solomon, translated by Samuel J. Eales (Minneapolis, Minnesota: Klock & Klock, 1984)
- St. Bernard's sermons on the Blessed Virgin Mary, translated from the original Latin by a priest of Mount Melleray (Chumleigh: Augustine, 1984)
- Bernard of Clairvaux, The twelve steps of humility and pride; and, On loving God, edited by Halcyon C. Backhouse (London: Hodder and Stoughton, 1985)
- St. Bernard's sermons on the Nativity, translated from the original Latin by a priest of Mount Melleray (Devon: Augustine, 1985)
- Bernard of Clairvaux : selected works, translation and foreword by G. R. Evans; introduction by Jean Leclercq; preface by Ewert H. Cousins (New York: Paulist Press, 1987). Contains the treatises On conversion, On the steps of humility and pride, On consideration, and On loving God; extracts from Sermons on The song of songs, and a selection of letters.
- Conrad Rudolph, The 'Things of Greater Importance': Bernard of Clairvaux's Apologia and the Medieval Attitude Toward Art (Philadelphia: University of Pennsylvania Press, 1990). Includes the Apologia in both Leclercq's Latin text and English translation.
- Love without measure: extracts from the writings of St Bernard of Clairvaux, introduced and arranged by Paul Diemer, Cistercian studies series no. 127 (Kalamazoo, Michigan: Cistercian Publications, 1990)
- Sermons for the summer season: liturgical sermons from Rogationtide and Pentecost, translated by Beverly Mayne Kienzle; additional translations by James Jarzembowski (Kalamazoo, Michigan: Cistercian Publications, 1991)
- Bernard of Clairvaux, On loving God, Cistercian Fathers series no. 13B (Kalamazoo, Michigan: Cistercian Publications, 1995)
- Bernard of Clairvaux, The parables & the sentences, edited by Maureen M. O'Brien. Cistercian Fathers Series no. 55 (Kalamazoo, Michigan: Cistercian Publications, 2000)
- Bernard of Clairvaux, On baptism and the office of bishops, on the conduct and office of bishops, on baptism and other questions: two letter-treatises, translated by Pauline Matarasso. Cistercian Fathers Series no. 67 (Kalamazoo, Michigan: Cistercian Publications, 2004)
- Bernard of Clairvaux, Sermons for Advent and the Christmas season translated by Irene Edmonds, Wendy Mary Beckett, Conrad Greenia; edited by John Leinenweber; introduction by Wim Verbaal. Cistercian Fathers Series no. 51 (Kalamazoo, Michigan: Cistercian Publications, 2007)
- Bernard of Clairvaux, Sermons for Lent and the Easter Season, edited by John Leinenweber and Mark Scott, OCSO. Cistercian Fathers Series no. 52 (Kalamazoo, Michigan: Cistercian Publications, 2013)
