= Montmorin =

Montmorin may refer to the following people and places.

== People ==
- Armand Marc, comte de Montmorin, French minister of foreign affairs and the navy under Louis XVI.

== Places ==
- Montmorin, Hautes-Alpes, a commune in the department of Hautes-Alpes
- Montmorin, Puy-de-Dôme, a commune in the department of Puy-de-Dôme
