= Henrician =

Henrician ("of or relating to Henry") may refer to:

- a follower of the heterodox preacher Henry of Lausanne (died 1148)
- Henrician Reformation, the first phase of the English Reformation (begun 1532) under Henry VIII
- Henrician castles, also called the Device Forts (1539–47), built by Henry VIII
- Henrician Articles (1573), electoral capitulation of the Polish king, first signed by Henry of Valois
