= De consideratione =

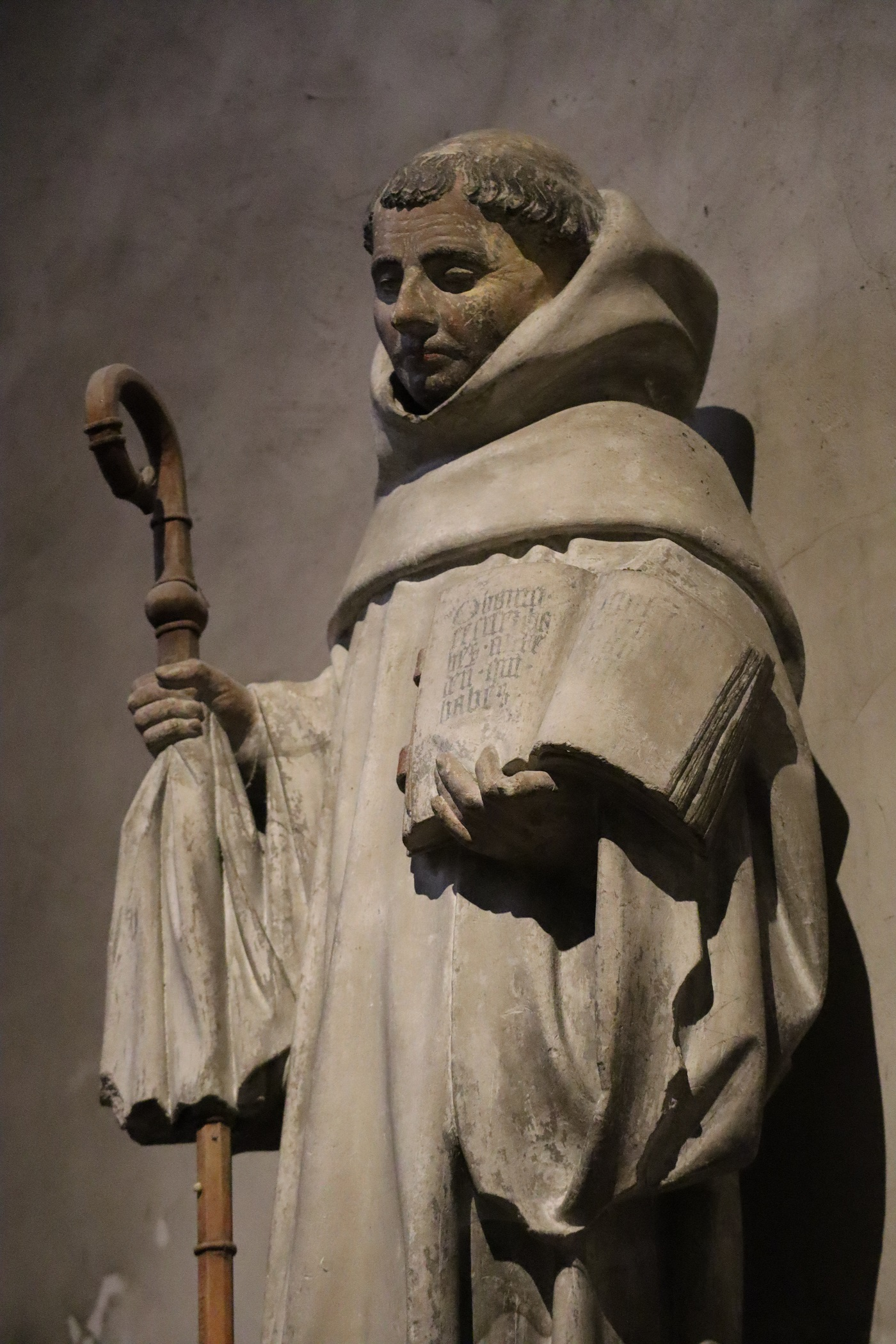
St. Bernard holding an open book

De consideratione is a book of five parts by Bernard of Clairvaux; the great 12th-century abbot wrote it for (or rather, to) his fellow Cistercian monk who had become Pope Eugenius III. The book is famous for its portrayal of a church leader in a conflict between devotion to God and the demands of the papal court. The book was written between 1148 and 1152, late in Bernard's life.

== Contents ==
The book follows the medieval genre of a "mirror" for examining one's conscience, but Bernard uses the occasion to develop theological speculation about the papacy and also about personal contemplation. Mayr-Harting summarizes the book's spiritual thrust as follows: "The pope is nobody without prayer, without consideration; the greater his stewardship, the more he must remember in humility that he owes everything to God. Bernard's purpose was moral and spiritual, and he wrote in a tradition which goes back at least to Pope Gregory the Great's Pastoral Care." The book also addresses the doctrine of the two swords. In general, Bernard uses the book to present monks as "the conscience of the medieval church."

In Book One, Bernard goes through what he imagines to be the appointments on the pope's daily schedule and criticizes Eugenius for being overloaded with inappropriate responsibilities. He is particularly critical of Eugenius' role of having to judge over litigation at the papal court. According to St. Paul, judges should be taken from those who despise the church.

Book Two mentions the failed second crusade as an example of God's inscrutable and often mysterious ways. As is typical for Bernard's free-ranging style, he soon changes topics and seeks to lead Eugenius to reflect on his monastic vows, in which humility play a major role. The papacy is, however, bound to seduce the monk-pope into thinking he is greater than those around him.

Book Three allows for the legitimate application of papal power, regardless of questions of humility. Heretics are to be disciplined, the unchurched brought into the fold, and ambitious clerics kept in their place. Several pages are devoted to the appeals made to the pope for special privileges and dispensations; these can be a temptation to corruption.

Book Four is about the people surrounding Eugene at court, and how he should consider them as brother bishops and set a good example for them, even be a "mirror of holiness" (4:23). He should also be careful about which clerics he chooses as advisors and confidants.

Book Five gives extensive details on the practice of Christian contemplation, and it provides an extensive discussion of speculative theology. Bernard explains to the pope not only what pontiff is authoritative over, but also "what is authoritative over him."

== Ecclesiastical influence ==
De consideratione defines Bernard's theory of the two swords, one being temporal authority and the other, spiritual. Bernard began writing about this topic in a letter to Eugenius in 1150. According to this theory, widely held among medieval theologians, the secular ruler is the servant of the church. His authority was given to him by the pope only in order to free churchmen from administrative and military tasks.

== Translations ==
There are hundreds of translations available; some of the most significant or recent ones are listed here.

- The first French translation was by François de S. Claude, titled Les Livres des Considérations du très religieux P. S. Bernard... au pape Eugène (1672). Another appeared in 1986.
- Hans Urs von Balthasar translated the book into German, a second edition was released in 2012.
- A Spanish translation was made in 1974 by a monk of Poblet Abbey.
- The third English translation was published in 1976.
