= Council of Pisa (1135) =

Council of the Catholic Church

The Council of Pisa, was convened by Pope Innocent II in May 1135. An extraordinary number of prelates, archbishops, bishops, monks, and abbots attended the council, including a large number of Italian clergy. The council addressed simony, schismatic clerics, and heresy. The papal donation to the Templars precipitated the papal bull, Omne datum optimum, which gave them an official sanction within the Catholic Church. Pisa would be the third council Innocent would convene to address issues within the Catholic Church. Taking place during the zenith of the papal schism, the 1135 Council has been identified as the turning point that brought the era of papal reform to a close.

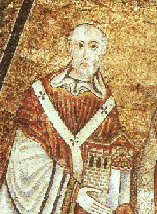
Innocent II

== Background ==
In February 1130, following the death of Pope Honorius II, the papal chancellor Haimeric, directing a committee of six cardinals, swiftly elected Gregorio Papareschi as Pope Innocent II. This was contested by the Roman Pierleoni family that chose Anacletus II. Without any Roman support Innocent fled to France, where he gained the support of Louis VI of France, Bernard of Clairvaux, and Peter the Venerable. While in France he held two Councils, Clermont (November 1130) and Rheims (October 1131). In June 1133, Innocent returned to Rome to quickly crown Lothair of Saxony emperor, but following Lothair's hurried exit from Rome he fled to Pisa.

The council was initially planned for November 1135, but Bernard who attended the Diet of Bamberg(March 1135), learned that Emperor Lothair was planning an invasion of Italy. Reinforced by this news, Innocent chose May 1135 for the synod.

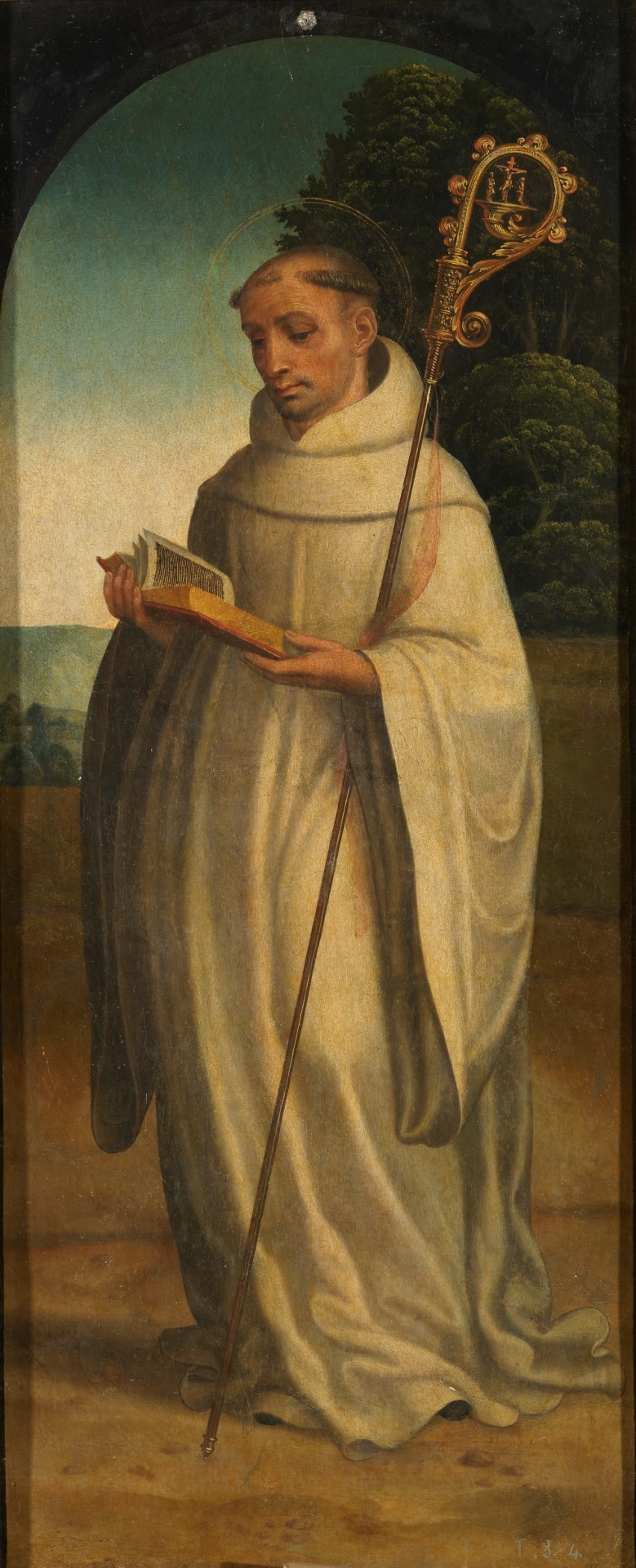
Bernard of Clairvaux

== Council ==
One hundred twenty-six archbishops and bishops, and numerous abbots from Italy, Germany, France, England, Spain and Hungary attended. Bernard used this council to rally support for Innocent II in northern Italy.

=== Excommunication and Condemnation ===
The first order of business was the excommunication of antipope Anacletus II and his supporters, including Roger II of Sicily. This was followed by the removal of the bishops of Halberstadt, Liege, Valence, Arezzo, Acera, and Moderna, and the archbishop of Milan all on the charges of simony or giving support to Anacletus II. All schismatic ordinations were condemned.

Henry the Monk was brought before the council and condemned on the charge of maintaining heretical views. He was ordered to cease his preaching and return to a monastery.

=== Templars ===
Bernard of Clairvaux called on the assembled clergy to allow the Knights Templar commanderies in their own jurisdictions. The importance of the Templars was demonstrated at the council, where Pope Innocent II praised their support during the papal schism and encouraged a closer bond between the order and the assembled bishops. The Templar Rule was given additional provisions governing fasts and feast days by Innocent. He also set a precedent by pledging a mark of gold each year to the Templar order, which was matched by the bishops who each gave a silver mark apiece. The council was pivotal to the Templar's establishment in the Bologna area, while the archbishop of Pisa, after the synod, was instrumental in the establishment of Templar commanderies in the surrounding region.

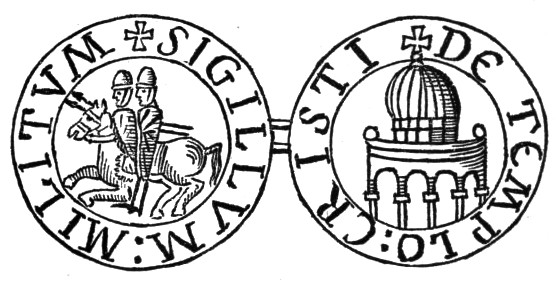
Seal of the Knights Templar

=== Clerical marriage ===
All marriages involving clerics, monks, and cloistered nuns were annulled. It was agreed by all participants of the council that such unions were not regarded as marriage. This judgment established celibacy as a major theme in Innocent's politics.

=== Regulation of religious orders ===
Restricted the placement of adolescents into religious orders, unless they show prudence and merit for that type of life.

== Aftermath ==
After the death of Antipope Anacletus II on 25 January 1138, his successor Gregorio de Conti (Antipope Victor IV) abandoned his claim and submitted to Innocent II within a few months, effectively bringing the papal schism to a close.

Modern historians have interpreted the Council of Pisa within the broader context of Innocent II’s response to the papal schism. H. W. Klewitz characterised the 1135 council as marking the effective end of the Gregorian reform papacy, reflecting broader changes in the nature of papal government and reform ideology. (Note: H.W. Klewitz, "Das Ende des Reformpapsttums," Deutsches Archiv für Geschichte des Mittelalters, in (1939), 871-41) I. S. Robinson has argued that Innocent II made systematic use of councils during his exile from Rome both to promote his reform programme and to demonstrate the legitimacy of his pontificate in opposition to antipope Anacletus II. In this interpretation, the Council was part of a wider pattern of conciliar activity used to consolidate support for Innocent’s authority during the schism.

At the Second Council of the Lateran on 29 March 1139, Innocent II issued Omne datum optimum, which formally confirmed the status of the Knights Templar within the Church and defined aspects of their ecclesiastical privileges. Subsequent patronage facilitated the establishment of Templar commanderies in northern Italy.

== Sources ==
- Bagni, Giampiero (2020). "A multidisciplinary approach to the production of wine on Templar estates: The Bologna commandery". In Morton, Nicholas (ed.). The Military Orders Volume VII: Piety, Pugnacity and Property. Routledge. ISBN 9781351020404.
- Bagni, Giampiero (2024). Templars in Bologna: A Multidisciplinary Approach. Routledge. ISBN 9781003861515.
- Barber, Malcolm (1994). The New Knighthood: A History of the Order of the Temple. Cambridge University Press. ISBN 9780521558723.
- Bellomo, Elena (2008). The Templar Order in North-west Italy: (1142 - C. 1330). Brill. ISBN 9789004163645.
- Dusil, Stephan (2019). "The Emerging Jurisprudence, the Second Lateran Council of 1139 and the Development of Canonical Impediments". In Summerlin, Danica; Eichbauer, Melodie H. (eds.). The Use of Canon Law in Ecclesiastical Administration, 1000–1234. Brill. pp. 140–158. ISBN 9789004387249.
- Freeburn, Ryan P. (2011). Hugh of Amiens and the Twelfth-century Renaissance. Ashgate. ISBN 9781317120513.
- Jedin, Hubert; Dolan, John Patrick, eds. (1980). History of the Church: From the High Middle Ages to the eve of the Reformation. Vol. IV. Burns & Oates.
- Longere, Jean (2005). "Lateran II, Council". In Lacoste, Jean-Yves (ed.). Encyclopedia of Christian Theology. Vol. 2: G-O. Routledge. pp. 882–883. ISBN 9781579582395.
- Robinson, I.S. (1990). The Papacy, 1073-1198. Cambridge University Press. ISBN 9780521319225.
- Robinson, I.S. (1995). "The papacy, 1122-1198". In Luscombe, David; Riley-Smith, Jonathan (eds.). The New Cambridge Medieval History. Vol. IV, c.1024 – c.1198, Part 2. Cambridge University Press. ISBN 978-0-521-41411-1.
- Somerville, Robert (1970). "The Council of Pisa, 1135: A Re-Examination of the Evidence for the Canons". Speculum. 45 (1 (Jan.)). The University of Chicago Press: 98–114. doi:10.2307/2855987. JSTOR 2855987.
- Tessera, Miriam Rita (2016). "Orientalis Ecclesia: The Papal Schism of 1130 and the Latin Church of the Crusader States". In Kedar, Benjamin Z.; Phillips, Jonathan; Riley-Smith, Jonathan (eds.). Crusades. Vol. 9. Routledge. ISBN 9781351985512.
- Upton-Ward, Judith Mary, ed. (1997). The Rule of the Templars: The French Text of the Rule of the Order of the Knights Templar. Translated by Upton-Ward, Judith Mary. The Boydell Press. ISBN 9780851157016.
- Walker, Williston (2014). History of the Christian Church. Scribner.
