= Doctor Mellifluus =

1953 encyclical of Pope Pius XII

Doctor Mellifluus Encyclical of Pope Pius XII
- Signature date: 24 May 1953
- Number: 24 of the pontificate

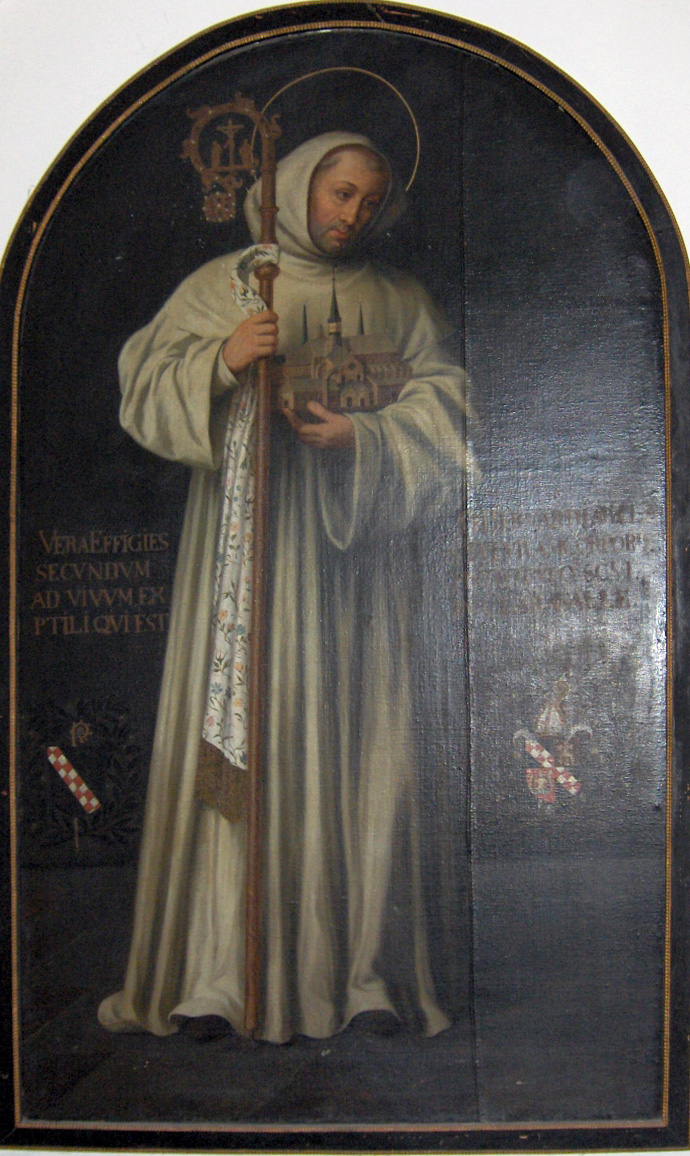
Bernard of Clairvaux

Doctor Mellifluus is an encyclical of Pope Pius XII on the Doctor of the Church Bernard of Clairvaux, given at Rome, St. Peter's, on 24 May, on the feast of Pentecost, 1953, in the 15th year of his pontificate. In issuing it in anticipation of the eighth centenary of Bernard's death, Pius took the occasion to highlight Bernard's contributions to practical spirituality.

== Content ==
The encyclical Doctor Mellifluus of 24 May 1953 was issued in commemoration of the eighth centenary of the death of Bernard of Clairvaux. Dom Sighard Kleiner, then Abbot-General of the Common Observance contributed to its drafting.

Pius XII, quoting Jean Mabillon, called Bernard, "the last of the Fathers, but certainly not inferior to the earlier ones". According to Thomas Merton, "The importance of this encyclical lies above all in its practicality. Pope Pius XII makes use of the doctrine of St. Bernard to bring the highest spiritual perfection within reach of all Christians, whether they be living in the cloister or in the world."

The title Doctor Mellifluus refers to Bernard as one whose teaching "is as sweet as honey". "His teaching was drawn, almost exclusively, from the pages of Sacred Scripture and from the Fathers, which he had at hand day and night in his profound meditations...

Pius noted that the teaching of the Doctor of Clairvaux on the mystical life seemed to be sometimes neglected and relegated to a secondary place, or forgotten by many.

"Wherefore, since love for God is gradually growing cold today in the hearts of many, or is even completely quenched, We feel that these writings of the "Doctor Mellifluus" should be carefully pondered; because from their content, which in fact is taken from the Gospels, a new and heavenly strength can flow both into individual and on into social life, to give moral guidance, bring it into line with Christian precepts, and thus be able to provide timely remedies for the many grave ills which afflict mankind."

Pius quotes Bernard's sermon In Cantica a number of times, in the first instance regarding the search for knowledge.

For there are some who want knowledge for the sole purpose of knowing, and this is unseemly curiosity. And there are some who seek knowledge in order to be known themselves; and this is unseemly vanity ... and there are also those who seek knowledge in order to sell their knowledge, for example, for money or for honors; and this is unseemly quest for gain. But there are also those who seek knowledge in order to edify, and this is charity. And there are those who seek knowledge in order to be edified, and this is prudence.

A significant theme of the encyclical is Bernard's teachings on the love of God. Pius pointed out that Bernard taught that "God wants to be loved by men rather than feared and honored," and touched upon his great reverence for the name of Jesus.

Merton said of Doctor Mellifluus, "I never saw anything so strong on the mystical life. It was a great inspiration to me..."

== Mariology ==
Pope Pius concludes his Encyclical Letter with a focus on Bernard's sermon of Mary as Star of the Sea, saying that there is perhaps no praise more beautiful, more moving, more apt to excite love for her, more useful to stir devotion and to inspire imitation of her virtuous example.

- When the storms to temptation burst upon you, when you see yourself driven upon the rocks of tribulation, look at the star, call upon Mary. When swallowed by pride or ambition, or hatred, or jealousy, look at the star, call upon Mary. Should anger, or avarice, or fleshly desire violently assail the frail vessel of your soul, look at the star, call upon Mary. If troubled on account of the heinousness of your sins, distressed at the filthy state of your conscience, and terrified at the thought of the awful judgment to come, you are beginning to sink into the bottomless gulf of sadness and to be swallowed in the abyss of despair, then think of Mary. In dangers, in doubts, in difficulties, think of Mary, call upon Mary. Let not her name leave thy lips, never suffer it to leave your heart.

Pius then invites all to be more devout to the loving Mother of God, and each in his respective state in life to strive to imitate her virtues.
