= Sainte-Marie, Hautes-Alpes =

Sainte-Marie
- Part of Valdoule
- Location of Sainte-Marie
- Location within France Location within Provence-Alpes-Côte d'Azur
- Coordinates: 44°27′59″N 5°28′33″E
- Country: France
- Region: Provence-Alpes-Côte d'Azur
- Department: Hautes-Alpes
- Arrondissement: Gap
- Canton: Serres
- Commune: Valdoule
- Area^{1}: 7.5 km^{2} (2.9 sq mi)
- Elevation: 660 m (2,170 ft)
- Highest elevation: 1,243 m (4,078 ft)
- Lowest elevation: 627 m (2,057 ft)
- Population (2023): 47
  - Density: 6.3/km^{2} (16/sq mi)
- Time zone: UTC+01:00 (CET)
  - Summer (DST): UTC+02:00 (CEST)
- Postal code: 05150
- ^{1} French Land Register data, which excludes lakes, ponds, glaciers > 1 km^{2} (0.386 sq mi or 247 acres) and river estuaries.

Sainte-Marie (French pronunciation: [sɛ̃t maʁi]; Vivaro-Alpine: Santa Maria) is a former commune in the Hautes-Alpes department in southeastern France. On 1 July 2017, it was merged into the new commune Valdoule.

== See also ==
- Communes of the Hautes-Alpes department
