= Apologia ad Guillelmum =

Bernard of Clairvaux's Apologia ad Guillelmum was written in 1125 at the ostensible request of his friend William of Saint-Thierry. It is the key document in the early twelfth century controversy over religious uses of art.

== Background ==
Already in the Early Christian period, there was disagreement within the Church as to the appropriateness of religious art. While the use of religious art gradually came to be accepted by the mainstream, its rejection within certain limits remained a constant throughout the Middle Ages.

== The Cistercian debate ==
In the twelfth century, certain reform monks (especially the Cistercians) considered art by monks to be inappropriate. Their critique of monastic art was seen as a criticism of the greatest patrons of religious art of the time, Benedictine monks. Since Benedictines were one of the richest and most influential segments of society, the controversy was not limited to aesthetic questions, but the monks' influence in general. By arguing for less art, critics seemed to be "slandering" them. Nonetheless, Bernard's Apologia is considered by Conrad Rudolph to be the most articulate contemporary presentation of the controversy.

== Art to attract donations ==
=== The monastic investment ===
Perhaps Bernard's harshest criticism of the monastic use of art addresses the economic base of monastic art production: the monastic investment in art for the purpose of attracting donations from the visiting public. In doing so, he takes up a number of different themes such as the justification of investing in art, art for the honor of God, the relation between material and spiritual prosperity, and the financial necessity of pilgrimage art.

=== The liturgical artwork ===
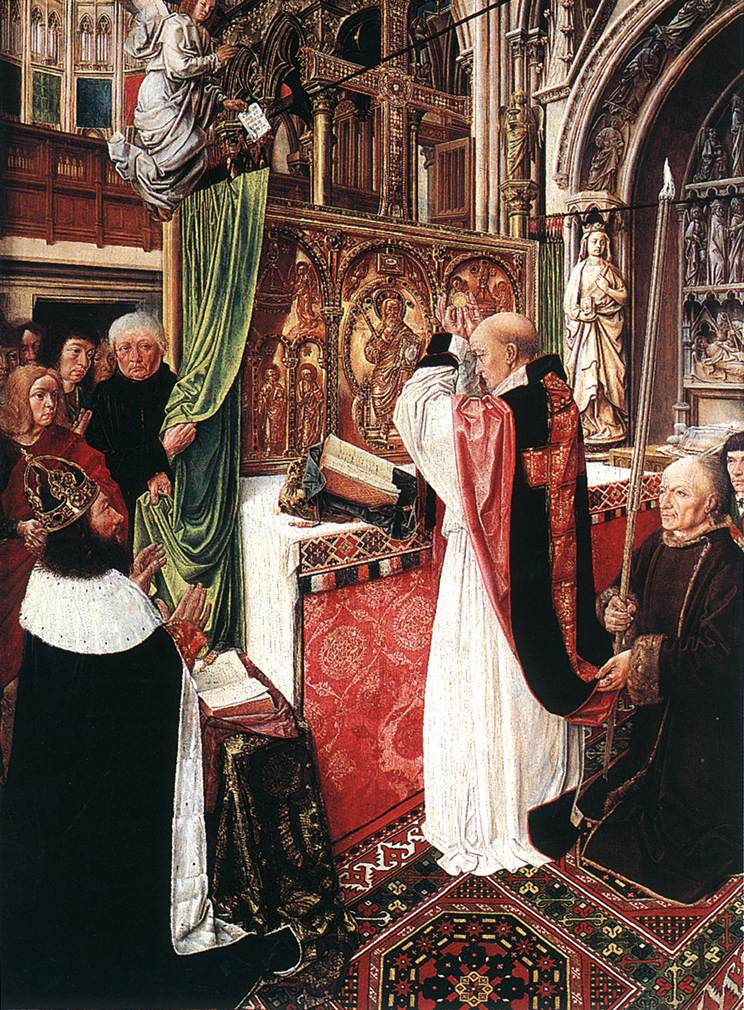
The Mass of Saint Giles, by the Master of Saint Giles, c. 1500 (National Gallery, London)

In discussing the artistic means by which the investment in art was carried out, Bernard particularly criticizes excess in art, focusing especially on excess in material, craftsmanship, size, and quantity. In this criticism, what he most objects to is not monumental sculpture and painting but rather liturgical art, that is, works often of gold, silver, and jewels that were used in the liturgy and often in the Cult of Relics.

=== The equation between excessive art and holiness ===
In his critique of the reception of art on the part of the general public, Bernard took up the indispensable element of medieval pilgrimage art: the equation between excessive art and holiness, that is, the use of excessive art in order to create a sense of praesentia (the physical presence of the holy).

=== Art in opposition to the care of the poor ===
Following in the patristic tradition, Bernard also sees art as in opposition to the care of the poor, his most significant social objection external to monasticism properly speaking.

=== Art as a spiritual distraction to the monk ===
One of Bernard's most important criticisms of the monastic use of art is that of art as a spiritual distraction to the monk. Aside from simple distraction, this criticism includes such dangers to the medieval monk as curiosity and materiality.

But in cloisters, where the brothers are reading, what is the point of this ridiculous monstrosity, this shapely misshapenness, this misshapen shapeliness? [...] so many and so marvelous are the various shapes surrounding us that it is more pleasant to read the marble than the books, and to spend the whole day marveling over these things rather than meditating on the law of God.

=== To Whom the Apologia Was Addressed ===
While the traditional view has been that the Apologia was directed at the art of the monastery of Cluny in particular and that of other offending Cluniac and traditional Benedictine monasteries in general, more recent scholarship has shown that the Apologia was instead directed at not only all of traditional monasticism but also marginal traditional Benedictine monasteries, the new ascetic orders (e.g. Carthusians, Gilbertines, Premonstratensians), and Bernard's own Cistercian Order.
