= Peter of Bruys =

Proto-Protestant Catholic heresiarch (1117-1135)

- Born: before c. 1117; Bruis, Dauphiné, France
- Died: c. 1131; St Gilles, Languedoc, France
- Occupations: Theologian, priest

Peter of Bruys (also known as Pierre De Bruys or Peter de Bruis; fl. 1117 – c.1131) was a medieval French proto-Protestant reformer and teacher. He was called a heresiarch and was deprived of his office by the Roman Catholic Church for opposing infant baptism, the erecting of churches and the veneration of crosses, the doctrine of transubstantiation and prayers for the dead. An angry Roman Catholic mob murdered him in or around 1131. His followers became known as Petrobrusians.

== Life and teachings ==
Much of the life of Peter of Bruys is unknown; our only information on him is derived from two extant sources, the treatise of Peter the Venerable against the Petrobrusians and a passage written by Peter Abelard.

Peter of Bruys was born at Bruis, in southeastern France. Peter was a Roman Catholic priest who began preaching in Dauphiné and Provence, probably between 1117 and 1120. The local bishops, who oversaw the dioceses of Embrun, Die, and Gap, suppressed his teachings within their jurisdictions. In spite of the official repression, Peter's teachings gained adherents at Narbonne, Toulouse and in Gascony.

Peter was influenced by some of the teachings of an earlier reformer from Italy named Gundolfo, especially in his teaching that salvation can be found outside of the official church and within reading the gospels and adopting their principles.

Peter admitted the doctrinal authority of the Gospels in their literal interpretation but considered the other New Testament writings to be valueless, as he doubted their apostolic origin. He questioned the Old Testament and rejected the authority of the Church Fathers and that of the Roman Catholic Church itself.

Petrobrusians also opposed clerical celibacy, infant baptism, prayers for the dead and organ music.

== Treatise of Peter the Venerable ==
In the preface to his treatise that attacked Peter of Bruys, Peter the Venerable summed up the five teachings that he saw as the errors of the Petrobrusians. Also known as Peter of Montboissier, he was an abbot and an important religious writer who became a popular figure in the church, an internationally-known scholar and an associate of many national and religious leaders of his day.

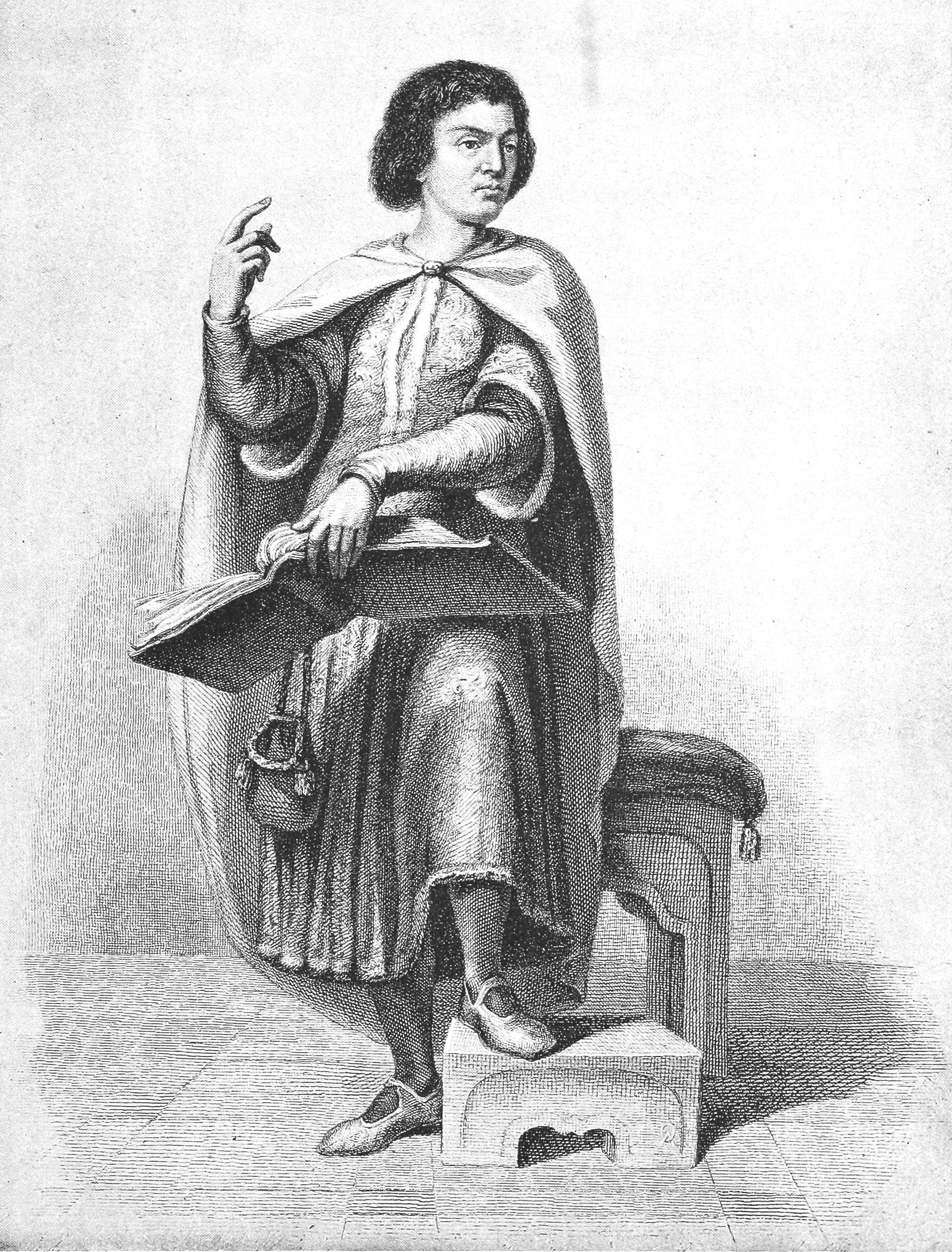
Both Peter the Venerable and Peter Abelard (pictured) attacked the teachings of Peter of Bruys.

The first "error" was their denial "that children, before the age of understanding, can be saved by the baptism... According to the Petrobrusians, not another's, but one's own faith, together with baptism, saves, as the Lord says, 'He who will believe and be baptized will be saved, but he who will not believe will be condemned.'" That idea ran counter to the medieval Church's teaching, particularly in the Latin West, following the theology of Augustine, in which the baptism of infants and children played an essential role in their salvation from the ancestral guilt of original sin.

The second error charged (with some exaggeration) was that the Petrobrusians said, "Edifices for temples and churches should not be erected... The Petrobrusians are quoted as saying, 'It is unnecessary to build temples, since the church of God does not consist in a multitude of stones joined together, but in the unity of the believers assembled.'" On the other hand, the medieval Church taught that cathedrals and churches were created to glorify God and believed it to be appropriate that those buildings should be as grand and beautiful as wealth and skill could make them.

The third error enumerated by Peter the Venerable was that the Petrobrusians "command the sacred crosses to be broken in pieces and burned, because that form or instrument by which Christ was so dreadfully tortured, so cruelly slain, is not worthy of any adoration, or veneration or supplication, but for the avenging of his torments and death it should be treated with unseemly dishonor, cut in pieces with swords, burnt in fire." That was seen as an iconoclastic heresy and as acts of sacrilege by the medieval Church and still is by Catholics today.

The fourth error, according to Peter the Venerable, was that the Petrobrusians denied sacramental grace, rejecting the rite of Communion entirely, let alone the doctrine of the Real Presence or the nascent Scholastic account of transubstantiation: "They deny, not only the truth of the body and blood of the Lord, daily and constantly offered in the church through the sacrament, but declare that it is nothing at all, and ought not to be offered to God. They say, 'Oh, people, do not believe the bishops, priests, or clergy who seduce you; who, as in many things, so in the office of the altar, deceive you when they falsely profess to make the body of Christ and give it to you for the salvation of your souls.'" The term, transubstantiation, used to describe the transformation of the consecrated bread and wine into the body and blood of Christ, was first used by Hildebert de Lavardin in about 1079. The theory had long been widely accepted as orthodox doctrine at the time of the attacks by Peter of Bruys. Less than two centuries later, in 1215, the Fourth Lateran Council officially declared transubstantiation the necessary, orthodox Catholic explanation of the Eucharist.

The fifth error was that "they deride sacrifices, prayers, alms, and other good works by the faithful living for the faithful dead, and say that these things cannot aid any of the dead even in the least... The good deeds of the living cannot profit the dead, because transferred from this life their merits cannot be increased or diminished, because beyond this life, there is no longer place for merits, only for retribution. Nor can a dead man hope to gain from anybody that which he did not obtain while alive in the world. Therefore those things are pointless that are done by the living for the dead, because they are mortal and have passed by death beyond the way for all flesh, into the state of the future world, and took with them all their merit, to which nothing can be added."

== Death and legacy ==
As Peter the Venerable recorded, crosses were singled out for special iconoclasm. Peter of Bruys felt that crosses should not deserve veneration. Crosses became for the Petrobrusians objects of desecration and were destroyed in bonfires. In or around the year 1131, Peter was publicly burning crosses to barbecue meat on Good Friday, in St Gilles, near Nîmes. The local populace, angered by Peter's sacrileges and offensive provocations, cast him into the flames of his own bonfire.

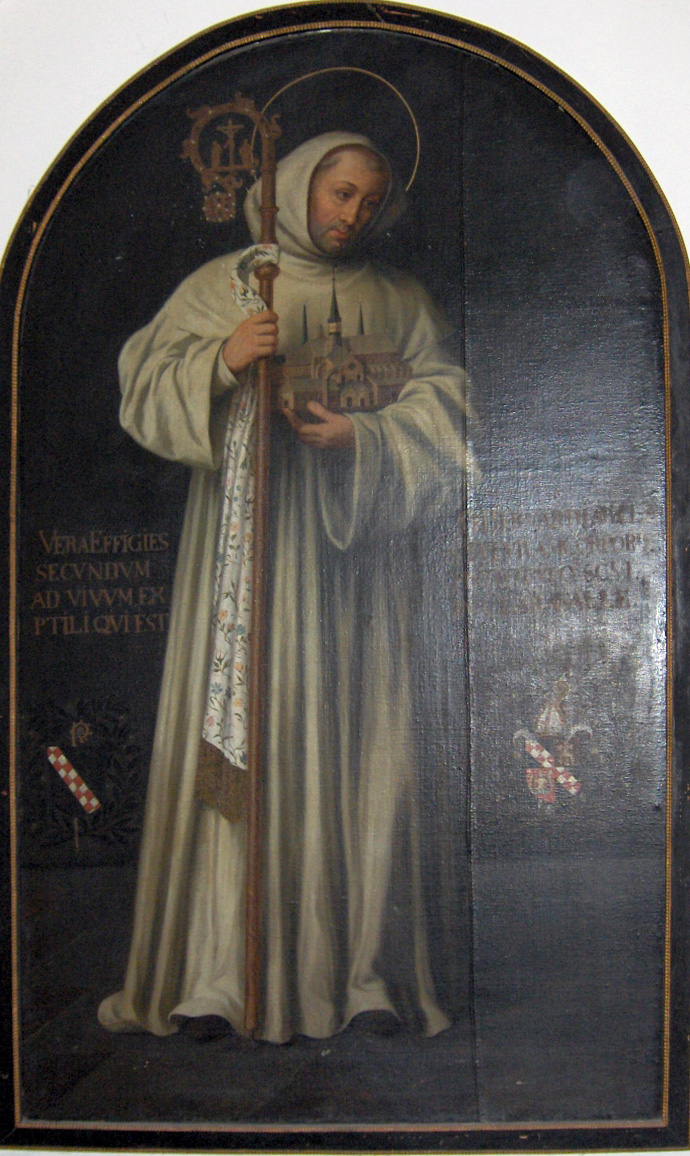
Bernard of Clairvaux preached for a return to Roman orthodoxy.

Henry of Lausanne, a former Cluniac monk, adopted the Petrobrusians' teachings about 1135 and spread them in a modified form after Peter's death.

His teachings continued to be frequently condemned by the Roman Catholic Church, meriting mention at the Second Lateran Council in 1139.

Henry of Lausanne's followers became known as Henricians. Both the Henrician and the Petrobrusian sects began to die out in 1145, the year St Bernard of Clairvaux began preaching for a return to Roman orthodoxy in southern France. In a letter to the people of Toulouse, written at the end of 1146, Bernard calls upon them to extirpate the last remnants of the heresy.

As late as 1151, however, some Henricians still remained active in Languedoc. In that year, the Benedictine monk and English chronicler Matthew Paris related that a young girl who claimed to be miraculously inspired by the Virgin Mary was reputed to have converted a great number of the disciples of Henry of Lausanne. The sects both disappear from the historical record after that reference.

Peter is considered a forerunner of the Protestant Reformation by some evangelical Protestants and Anabaptists.
