= Last of the Fathers =

Christian saintly title

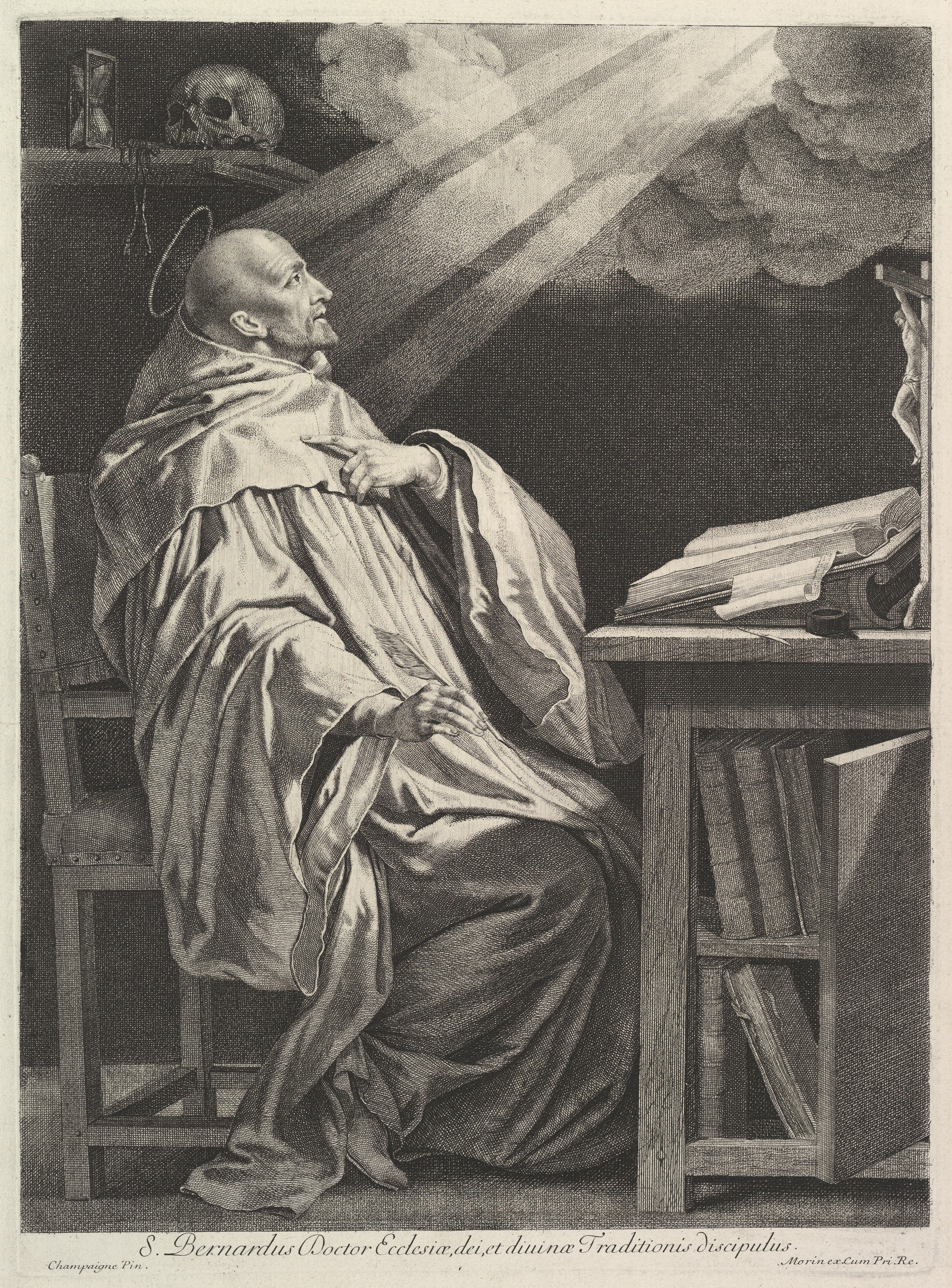
Etching of Bernard de Clairvaux by Jean Morin.

Last of the Fathers is a title adscribed to the Catholic saint and doctor of the Church Bernard of Clairvaux (1090–1153).

The term appears in the Doctor Mellifluus encyclical by Pius XII, quoted from French monk and scholar Jean Mabillon, and is also part of the subtitle of the letter. The concept follows from the Western Christian view of a finished "Patristic Age" superseded by the advent of Scholasticism.

Pope Benedict XVI also used the term and defended it in a 2009 general audience. Despite the fact that the title is mostly assigned to Bernard, it has also been used regarding John of Damascus (675–749).

The Eastern Orthodox Church rejects the title as it believes the Patristic Age can not be given an end point. Nevertheless, some Eastern Christians consider John of Damascus, Gregory I or Isidore of Seville as the last Church Fathers from East and West.

== See also ==
- Apophatic theology
- Bede the Venerable
- List of early Christian writers
