= Valdoule =

- Commune
- Location of Valdoule
- Location within France Location within Provence-Alpes-Côte d'Azur
- Coordinates: 44°28′08″N 5°30′50″E
- Country: France
- Region: Provence-Alpes-Côte d'Azur
- Department: Hautes-Alpes
- Arrondissement: Gap
- Canton: Serres
- Intercommunality: CC du Sisteronais-Buëch

Government
  - Mayor (2026–32): Gérard Tenoux
- Area^{1}: 58.51 km^{2} (22.59 sq mi)
- Population (2023): 204
  - Density: 3.49/km^{2} (9.03/sq mi)
- Time zone: UTC+01:00 (CET)
  - Summer (DST): UTC+02:00 (CEST)
- INSEE/Postal code: 05024 /05150
- ^{1} French Land Register data, which excludes lakes, ponds, glaciers > 1 km^{2} (0.386 sq mi or 247 acres) and river estuaries.

Valdoule (French pronunciation: [valdul]) is a commune in the department of Hautes-Alpes, southeastern France. The municipality was established on 1 July 2017 by merger of the former communes of Bruis (the seat), Montmorin and Sainte-Marie. As of 2023, the population of the commune was 204.

== Geographical Location ==
Situated in the Baronnies region, Valdoule lies west of Gap and north of Serres. The commune shares a border with the Drôme department and the commune of La Charce.

== Natural Features ==
The commune is traversed by the Oule River, a 32.7 km watercourse originating in Montmorin and flowing into the Eygues River at Rémuzat.

== Climate ==
Valdoule experiences a Mediterranean-influenced climate, characterized by mild, wet winters and warm, dry summers. The region's elevation contributes to temperature variations and occasional snowfall during winter months.

== Tourism and Heritage ==
Valdoule offers several points of interest:

- Montmorin Village: This perched village features recently renovated "pas d’âne" stepped pathways, leading visitors through its charming streets. Sisteron Buech
- Bruis Tower: A medieval dungeon situated on a narrow plateau covered with broom, accessible via a hiking trail. Sisteron Buech
- Sainte-Marie's Seigneurial Residence: A notable manor house with a distinctive tower, reflecting the area's historical architecture. Sisteron Buech

The commune is also known for its natural beauty, including walnut groves and the scenic Gorges des Archettes

== See also ==
- Communes of the Hautes-Alpes department
