= Bruis =

- Part of Valdoule
- Location of Bruis
- Location within France Location within Provence-Alpes-Côte d'Azur
- Coordinates: 44°28′08″N 5°30′52″E
- Country: France
- Region: Provence-Alpes-Côte d'Azur
- Department: Hautes-Alpes
- Arrondissement: Gap
- Canton: Serres
- Commune: Valdoule
- Area^{1}: 25.15 km^{2} (9.71 sq mi)
- Elevation: 708 m (2,323 ft)
- Highest elevation: 1,521 m (4,990 ft)
- Lowest elevation: 655 m (2,149 ft)
- Population (2023): 77
  - Density: 3.1/km^{2} (7.9/sq mi)
- Time zone: UTC+01:00 (CET)
  - Summer (DST): UTC+02:00 (CEST)
- Postal code: 05150
- ^{1} French Land Register data, which excludes lakes, ponds, glaciers > 1 km^{2} (0.386 sq mi or 247 acres) and river estuaries.

Bruis (French pronunciation: [bʁɥis]) is a former commune in the Hautes-Alpes department in southeastern France. On 1 July 2017, it was merged into the new commune Valdoule.

== See also ==
- Communes of the Hautes-Alpes department
