= Liber ad milites templi de laude novae militiae =

Essay by Bernard of Clairvaux

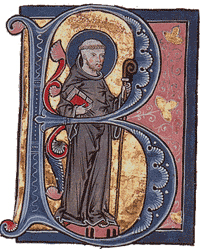
Bernard of Clairvaux

The Liber ad milites templi de laude novae militiae (Latin for 'Book to the Knights of the Temple, in praise of the new knighthood') was a work written by Saint Bernard of Clairvaux (1090 – August 20, 1153). From its tone, content, and timing, its main purpose appears to have been to boost the morale of the fledgling Knights Templar in Jerusalem.

== Background ==
The Knights Templar were most likely formed in January 1120, at the Council of Nablus.

Bernard begins the Liber de laude by directly addressing Hugh of Payens, the founder and first Master of the Templars, saying that Hugh has asked him three times to write an 'exhortation' (exhortatio) to his knights.

The reason for Hugh's persistence almost certainly lies in the fact that in the early 1120s, some of the first Templars were having doubts about the idea of an order of monks devoted to military combat in the crusades. A letter from around this time written to the Templars by one 'Hugh the Sinner' (Hugo Peccator) spells out these doubts explicitly, noting that the Templars were worried about whether there was a genuine theological justification for monk-warriors.

== Publication ==
The date of the Liber de laude is uncertain, although the fact it was addressed to Hugh of Payens, the first Master of the Templars, means it was written between 1120 (when the Templars were founded) and 1136, when Hugh died.

== Content ==
The Liber de laude is divided into two parts:

- The first section deals directly with the Knights Templar. Bernard puts his weight firmly behind the Templars by comparing them with the regular knights of the age. He criticizes the ordinary knights for their vanity, wanton violence, and pointlessness. In contrast, he praises the Templars as noble, following a higher calling, fearless, and holy.
- The second section is a description of the holy places in the crusader states. By linking the Templars to these sacred sites, Bernard was presenting them as custodians of a key aspect of Christian heritage.

=== Representative excerpts ===
Excerpts from

- Chapter 1: "a new kind of knighthood ... It ceaselessly wages a twofold war both against flesh and blood and against a spiritual army of evil in the heavens. ... He is truly a fearless knight and secure on every side, for his soul is protected by the armor of faith just as his body is protected by armor of steel. He is thus doubly armed and need fear neither demons nor men."
- Chapter 2: "this worldly knighthood, or rather knavery ... you paint your shields and your saddles; you adorn your bits and spurs with gold and silver and precious stones, and then in all this glory you rush to your ruin with fearful wrath and fearless folly."
- Chapter 3: "The knight of Christ may strike with confidence and die yet more confidently, for he serves Christ when he strikes, and serves himself when he falls."
- Chapter 4 sketches the moral code of the knights: "careful to earn their bread by repairing their worn armor and torn clothing", "deference is shown to merit rather than to noble blood", "arm themselves interiorly with faith and exteriorly with steel".
- Chapter 5 describes how the knighthood would be headquartered in Jerusalem, "adorned with weapons rather than with jewels, and in place of the ancient golden crowns, its walls are hung round about with shields. In place of candlesticks, censers and ewers, this house is well furnished with saddles, bits and lances".
