= Petrobrusians =

12th century proto-Protestant group

Petrobrusians were a 12th century proto-Protestant group that rejected infant baptism, Catholic mass, veneration of the cross and prayers for the dead.

== Teachings ==
The teachings of Peter of Bruys are known primarily through the writings of his opponent, Peter the Venerable. According to these accounts, the Petrobrusians held five principal tenets.

First, they advocated for the baptism of adult believers, asserting that personal faith was a necessary prerequisite for the sacrament's validity. Second, they rejected the veneration of the cross, viewing it as the instrument of Christ's suffering that should be held in horror, and were accused of burning crosses. Third, as iconoclasts, they repudiated the doctrine of the Real Presence in the Eucharist, denied that the Mass constituted a sacrifice, and rejected the use of church buildings and altars. Fourth, they rejected prayers, sacrifices, and alms for the dead.

Fifth, in their approach to scripture, the Petrobrusians accepted the authority of the four Gospels, which they interpreted literally. They considered the New Testament epistles to have a subordinate authority, questioning their apostolic origin, and they rejected the authority of the Old Testament.

== Comparison to Catharism ==
Certain scholars, such as the 19th-century theologian Johann Joseph Ignaz von Döllinger, have identified the Petrobrusians as a forerunner to or a part of the Cathar movement. This identification is based on several shared doctrines, including the rejection of infant baptism, the rejection of the veneration of the cross, and the rejection of the doctrine of transubstantiation. Additionally, the Petrobrusians repudiated the authority of the Old Testament and the Church Fathers, prioritizing a literal interpretation of the Gospels.

However, this classification is contested based on significant theological differences. Surviving sources do not describe the Petrobrusians as holding the dualist or Manichaean ascetic beliefs that were central to Catharism. Furthermore, the two groups held opposing views on marriage. The Petrobrusians permitted and even encouraged marriage, whereas the Cathars condemned marriage and procreation as inherently sinful, a belief rooted in their dualist theology. Cathar elites, known as the Perfecti, were required to avoid all sexual contact.
