= Jean-Baptiste Chautard =

Jean-Baptiste Chautard OCSO (12 March 1858, in Briançon, France – 29 September 1935, at Sept-Fons Abbey) was a French Trappist abbot and religious writer.

== Biography ==
Gustave Chautard became a novice in the Trappist abbey of Aiguebelle on May 6, 1877. After theological studies he was ordained a priest on 3 June 1884. Among his early duties was the care of the abbey's chocolate factory. In 1897, he was elected abbot in the monastery Chambarand near Grenoble and then, only two years later, he became abbot of the monastery that had founded Chambarand, Sept-Fons. Thus, he became responsible for several foundations that Sept-Fons had made in the 19th century. Chautard became one of the leading figures in the Trappist Order. He continued the expansion for which the Order was known at that time, even achieving in 1898/99 the purchase of the famous Cîteaux Abbey, in which the Cistercian Order began around 1100 (the monastery had been lost during the French Revolution). Monks from La Trappe and Sept-Fons were sent there to reestablish Cistercian life. Jean-Baptiste Chautard suffered a fatal heart attack while returning home from the Trappist General Chapter in 1935.

== Writings ==
Dom Chautard was also responsible for foundations in Belgium (Orval) and Latin America, yet his reputation as the author of religious books made him even more well known among European and American Catholics. His Soul of the Apostolate has been translated into several languages and is still in print. Chautard's books were the fruit of his daily spiritual conferences in the abbeys under his care; he was also an active letter writer. The book seeks to underline the basic and indispensable importance of prayer and Marian devotions, all the more so for people engaged in an active life of apostolic works.

Several popes cited Chautard's book and recommended it to wide audiences. Pope Pius X was said to have it on his night stand, Benedict XV wrote a foreword for it, and Benedict XVI cited it during his visit to Lourdes in 2008.
