= Henry of Lausanne =

12th-century itinerent preacher of heretical ideas

Henry of Lausanne (variously known as of Bruys, of Cluny, of Toulouse, of Le Mans and as the Deacon, sometimes referred to as Henry the Monk or Henry the Petrobrusian) was a French heresiarch of the first half of the 12th century. His preaching began around 1116 and he died imprisoned around 1148. His followers are known as Henricians.

== Life and teachings ==
Practically nothing is known of Henry's origin or early life. He likely received his orders in the Benedictine Abbey of Cluny. If St Bernard's reproach (Ep. 241) is correct, Henry was an apostate monk—a Benedictine black monk according to the chronicler Alberic de Trois Fontaines.

Henry was an itinerant preacher. He was a tall, charismatic ascetic, with a beard and long hair. His voice was sonorous, and his eyes flashed fire. He went bare-footed, preceded by a man carrying a staff surmounted with an iron cross; he slept on the bare ground, and lived by alms.

When Henry arrived at the episcopal town of Le Mans in 1101, probably from Lausanne, Bishop Hildebert de Lavardin was absent and Henry was granted permission to preach from March to July, a practice reserved for the regular clergy, and soon attained considerable influence over the people. Knowledge of his ministry is mostly hearsay from a pamphlet by Abbot Peter of Cluny. He is said to have preached penitence, rejecting both the intercession of saints and second marriages. Women, encouraged by his words, gave up their jewels and luxurious apparel, and young men married prostitutes in the hope of reforming them.

At his instigation the inhabitants of Le Mans soon began to slight the clergy of their town and to reject all ecclesiastical authority. On his return from Rome, Hildebert had a public disputation with Henry, in which, according to the Maurist Antoine Beaugendre's Acta episcoporum Cenomannensium, Henry was shown to be less guilty of heresy than of ignorance. He, however, was forced to leave Le Mans due to his anti-clericalism, and probably went to Poitiers and afterwards to Bordeaux. Later we find him in the archdiocese of Arles, where the archbishop arrested him and had his case referred to the tribunal of the pope.

In 1135 Henry was brought by the archbishop of Arles before Pope Innocent II at the Council of Pisa, where he was condemned for heretical views and told to return to a monastery. It appears that St Bernard offered him an asylum at Clairvaux. Instead, he returned to the Midi where he came under the influence of Peter of Bruys. He adopted the Petrobrusians' teaching about 1135 and spread it in a modified form after its author's death.

Around 1139, Peter of Cluny, wrote a treatise called Epistola seu tractatus adversus Petrobrusianos (Migne, Patr. Lat. clxxxix) against the disciples of Peter of Bruys and Henry of Lausanne, whom he calls Henry of Bruys, and whom, at the moment of writing, he accuses of preaching, in all the dioceses in the south of France, errors which he had inherited from Peter of Bruys. According to Peter of Cluny, Henry's teaching is summed up as follows: rejection of the doctrinal and disciplinary authority of the church; recognition of the Gospel freely interpreted as the sole rule of faith; condemnation of the baptism of infants, of the eucharist, of the sacrifice of the mass, of the communion of saints, and of prayers for the dead; and refusal to recognize any form of worship or liturgy.

The success of this teaching spread very rapidly in the south of France. Speaking of this region, St Bernard (Ep. 241) says: "The churches are without flocks, the flocks without priests, the priests without honour; in a word, nothing remains save Christians without Christ." On several occasions St Bernard was begged to fight the innovator on the scene of his exploits, and in 1145, at the instance of the legate Alberic, cardinal bishop of Ostia, he set out, passing through the diocese of Angoulême and Limoges, sojourning for some time at Bordeaux, and finally reaching the heretical towns of Bergerac, Périgueux, Sarlat, Cahors and Toulouse. At Bernard's approach Henry departed Toulouse, leaving there many adherents, both of noble and humble birth, and especially among the weavers.

== Death and legacy ==
St Bernard's eloquence and reported miracles made many converts, and Toulouse and Albi were quickly restored to Roman orthodoxy. After inviting Henry to a disputation, which he refused to attend, St Bernard returned to Clairvaux. Soon afterwards Henry of Lausanne was arrested, brought before the bishop of Toulouse, and probably imprisoned for life. In a letter written at the end of 1146, St Bernard calls upon the people of Toulouse to extirpate the last remnants of the heresy. In 1151, however, some Henricians still remained in Languedoc, for Matthew Paris relates (Chron. maj., at date 1151) that a young girl, who gave herself out to be miraculously inspired by the Virgin Mary, was reputed to have converted a great number of the disciples of Henry of Lausanne.

It is impossible to designate definitely as Henricians one of the two sects discovered at Cologne and described by Everwin, provost of Steinfeld, in his letter to St Bernard (Migne, Patr. Lat., clxxxii. 676-680), or the heretics of Périgord mentioned by a certain monk Heribert (Martin Bouquet, Recueil des historiens des Gaules et de la France, XII.550-551).

According to the British Puritan Rev. Dr. William Wall, "the Petrobrusians—otherwise called the 'Henricians'—did own water-baptism, and yet deny infant-baptism.... Peter Bruis and Henry [of Lausanne were] the two first antipaedobaptist preachers in the world."

The Jehovah's Witnesses suggest that Henry of Lausanne may have been one of a long line of "genuine anointed Christians" who defended Bible truth down through the ages.

== Sources ==
- Peter of Cluny, Tractatus Contra Petrobrussianos, found in Migne, Patrologia Latina, vol. 189, pp. 720–850.
- Les Origines de l'hérésie albigeoise, by Vacandard in the Revue des questions historiques (Paris, January 1894, pp. 50–84).
- W. Wall: op. cit. I p. xliv.
- Walker, Williston (2014). History of the Christian Church. Scribner.
