= Cardinals created by Paschal II =

Catholic appointments from 1099 to 1117

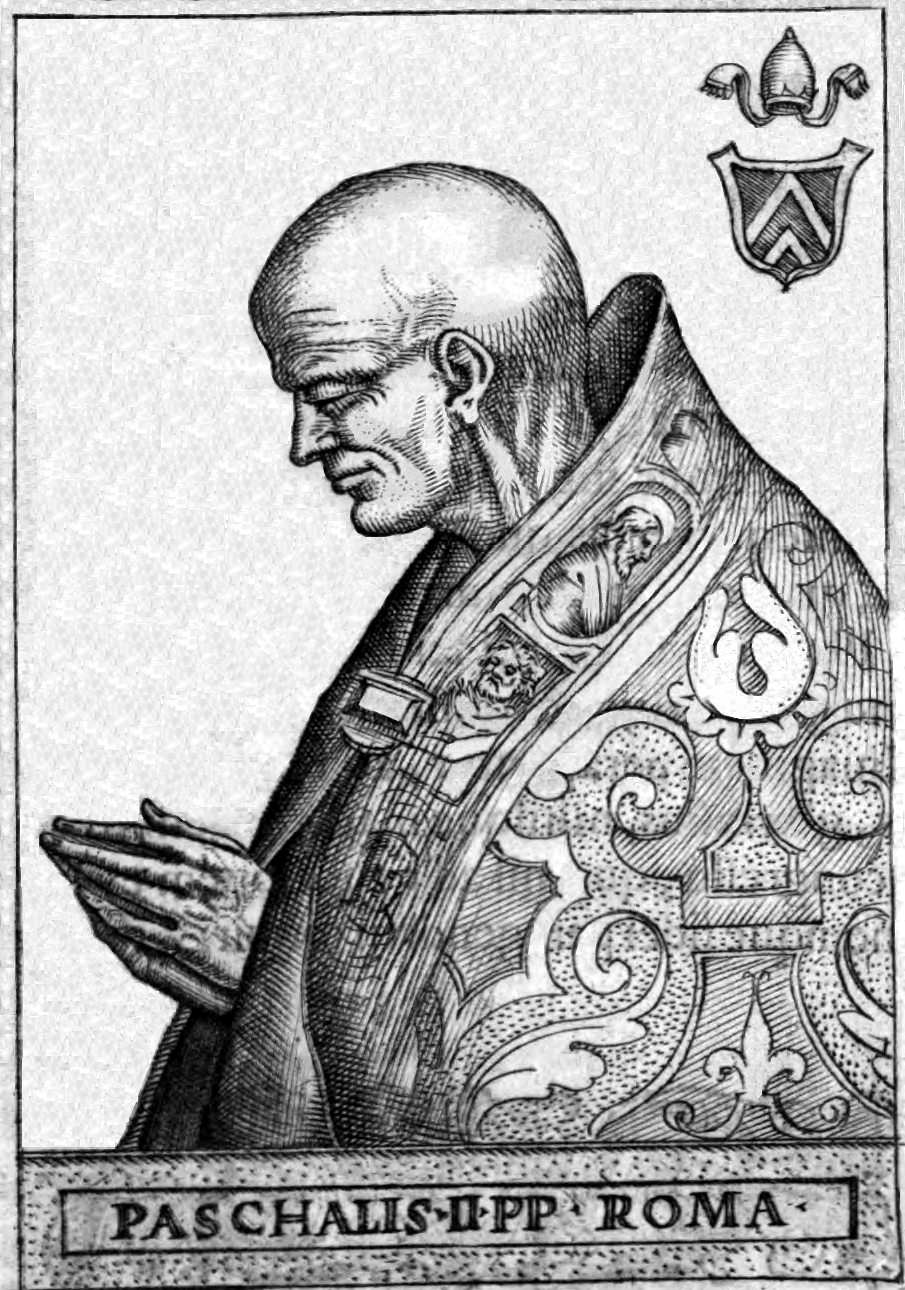
Pope Paschal II.

Pope Paschal II (r. 1099–1118) created 92 cardinals in fifteen consistories held throughout his pontificate. This included the future Antipope Anacletus II, Pope Anastasius IV and Pope Innocent II.

== 1099 ==
- Crisogono
- Giovanni O.S.B.
- Amico, O.S.B. Cas., Cardinal-Priest of Ss. Nereo ed Achilleo;
- Gregorio Gaetani
- Guido O.S.B.
- Ugo
- Pandolfo O.S.B. Cas.
- Ulrich
- Antonio
- Bd. Berardo dei Marsi, Cardinal-Deacon of Sant'Adriano al Foro
- Bobone
- Gualon O.S.B. Clun.
- Gregorio O.S.B.
- Docibilo

== 1100 ==
- Pietro
- Agostino
- Romano
- Teobaldo
- Pietro Modoliense
- Pietro O.S.B. Cas.
- Giovanni
- Gualterio

== 1101 ==
- Riccardo O.S.B.

== 1102 ==
- Crescenzio seniore
- Domnizzone
- Teobaldo, Cardinal-Deacon of S. Maria Nuova

== 1104 ==
- Gualon
- Ubaldo

== 1105 ==
- Corrado
- Leone O.S.B. Cas.
- Bonifacio
- Desiderio, Cardinal-Priest of S. Prassede
- Domnizzone
- Guy
- Giovanni
- Vitale
- Ascanio
- Ugo d'Alatri
- Bosone

== 1106 ==
- Cinzio
- Vincenzo
- Gezo
- Errico
- Pietro Pierleoni O.S.B. Clun., Cardinal-Deacon of Ss. Cosma e Damiano (future Antipope Anacletus II)

== 1107 ==
- Giovanni, Cardinal-Priest of S. Cecilia
- Gregorio, Cardinal-Priest of San Lorenzo in Lucina
- Leone

== 1108 ==
- Kuno von Urach Can. Reg., Cardinal-bishop of Palestrina;

== 1112 ==
- Manfredo
- Ugo Visconti
- Uberto
- Gregorio dei Conti di Ceccano, Cardinal-Priest of Santi Apostoli, Antipope from March to 29 May 1138
- Pietro Gherardesca, Cardinal-Priest of San Marcello al Corso
- Anastasio, Cardinal-Priest of S. Clemente
- Niccolò
- Pietro
- Roscemanno, O.S.B. Cas., Cardinal-Deacon of S. Giorgio in Velabro
- Oderisio O.S.B. Cas., Cardinal-Deacon of S. Agata
- Romualdo Guarna, Cardinal-Deacon of Santa Maria in Via Lata
- Crescenzio

== 1113 ==
- Adeodato, Cardinal-Priest of S. Lorenzo in Damaso
- Corrado
- Gionata
- Teodoro
- Gregorio

== 1114 ==
- Anatasio
- Bonifacio, Cardinal-Priest of S. Marco
- Giovanni O.S.B. Cas.
- Teobaldo
- Corrado Dimitri Della Subburra, Cardinal-Priest of S. Pudenziana, future Pope Anastasius IV.

== 1115 ==
- Leone
- Vitale, Cardinal-bishop of Albano
- Divizo (or Divizzo), Cardinal-Priest of Ss. Silvestro e Martino
- Gerardo
- Leone O.S.B.
- Giovanni

== 1116 ==
- Crescenzio iuniore
- Pietro seniore
- Bosone, Cardinal-priest of S. Anastasia
- Pietro
- Gregorio Papareschi (1116) - Cardinal-Deacon of S. Angelo in Pescheria, future Pope Innocent II

== 1117 ==
- Lamberto
- Sasso, Cardinal-Priest of S. Stefano al Monte Celio
- Giovanni da Crema, Cardinal-Priest of S. Crisogono
- Rainerio, Cardinal-Priest of Ss. Marcellino e Pietro
- Bosone
- Crisogono
- Sigizzone
- Teobaldo, Cardinal-Priest of Ss. Giovanni e Paolo
- Pietro
- Amico O.S.B. Cas. iuniore
- Crisogono Malcondini
- Errico O.S.B.

== Sources ==
- Miranda, Salvador. "Consistories for the creation of Cardinals, 12th Century (1099-1198): Paschal II (1099-1118)". The Cardinals of the Holy Roman Church. Florida International University. OCLC 53276621.
