= Joannes of S. Cecilia =

12th-century Roman Catholic cardinal

Joannes (Ioannes, Johannes) was a 12th century Roman Catholic Cardinal, and Cardinal-priest of the titulus of Santa Cecilia in Trastevere in Rome. Alfonso Chacón writes that he was a member of the Capizucchi family, but he was deceived by the forgeries of Alfonso Ceccarelli, a contemporary acquaintance. (Note: Lorenzo Cardella, Memorie storiche de' Cardinali della Santa Romana chiesa Vol. I. 1 (Roma: Pagliarini 1792), pp. 214-215, already realized that there was a problem with the Capizzuchi cardinals, but he accepted Ciaconius' bad information.) In fact, according to Agostino Paravicini Bagliani, in the 11th and 12th centuries the Capizucchi family had no cardinals.

== Early career ==
Alfonso Chacón writes that he was present at the Council of Guastalla on 22 October 1106, but there is no evidence to support his statement. The point is passed by in silence by Rudolf Hüls. He calculates, however, that Joannes should have become a cardinal by 1106, working from the subscription lists on papal documents, and the order in which cardinals signed their names (his Anciennitätprinzip).

== Cardinal ==
Cardinal Joannes was present at the Lateran synod of March 1112, and signed its decrees on 23 March.

Cardinal Joannes of S. Cecilia participated in the election of Cardinal Giovanni Gaetani as Pope Gelasius II on 24 January 1118. The electoral meeting took place at the monastery of the Palladium (Santa Maria in Pallara, near the Arch of Titus and the Arch of Constantine) for reasons of security. Cardinal Joannes was one of those present. During the enthronement ceremony, Cencius Frangipani and his supporters broke into the monastery, seized and abused the pope and others, and carried Gelasius off to one of their prisons. He was rescued, but, on the approach of Henry V to Rome, he fled to Gaeta, to Capua, and then to Pisa. Cardinal Joannes remained behind in Rome, and functioned in Rome as a member of the curia, headed by the Vicar of Rome, Cardinal Petrus of Porto. His name appears on a curial decision with those of five other cardinals, in favor of the monastery of S. Sofia in Benevento.

Pope Gelasius died at Cluny in Burgundy on 29 January 1119. Following his death, the ten cardinals who were present, after consultation with other prelates, Roman officials, and other Romans who were present, proceeded to an election, with the agreement that the name of the successful candidate would be sent to Rome for confirmation. Archbishop Guy of Vienne was elected on 2 February 1119. Within days, Cardinal Pietro Senex presided over the ratification by the Roman clergy of the election of Pope Calixtus II, which was sent to France in time for him to be enthroned in the cathedral of Vienne on 9 February 1119. Various cardinals in Rome sent supplementary letters, approving of the actions at Cluny. Cardinal Joannes shared a letter with several of the cardinal-priests.

In 1121, from January through April, he participated in the subscribing of papal documents at the Lateran.

On 8 July 1123, Joannes participated at the consecration of a chapel at his own titular church of Santa Cecilia, performed by Bishops Pietro of Porto, Vitalis of Albano, and Guilelmus of Palestrina, in the presence of Pope Calixtus II. The chapel had been the gift of Cardinal Giovanni da Crema.

It is not known whether, or in what way, he may have participated in the electoral events, canonical or uncanonical, of December 1124, which led to the enthronement of Pope Honorius II.

His latest known subscription to a papal document took place at the Lateran on 7 May 1128. His successor, Cardinal Goselinus, subscribed on 24 March 1129.

== Bibliography ==
- Gregorovius, Ferdinand (1896), History of Rome in the Middle Ages. Volume IV. part 2, second edition (London: George Bell, 1896).
- Hüls, Rudolf (1977). Kardinäle, Klerus und Kirchen Roms: 1049–1130 (in German). Bibliothek des Deutschen Historischen Instituts in Rom. ISBN 978-3-484-80071-7.
- Jaffé, Philippus (1885). Regesta pontificum Romanorum ab condita Ecclesia ad annum post Christum natum MCXCVIII (in Latin). Vol. Tomus primus (second ed.). Leipzig: Veit.
- Klewitz, Hans-Walter (1957). Reformpapsttum und Kardinalkolleg. Die Entstehung des Kardinalkollegiums. Studien über die Wiederherstellung der römischen Kirche in Süditalien durch das Reformpapsttum. Das Ende des Reformpapsttums (in German). Hermann Gentner Verlag, Darmstadt.
- Watterich, J. B. M. (1862). Pontificum Romanorum qui fuerunt inde ab exeunte saeculo IX usque ad finem saeculi XIII vitae: ab aequalibus conscriptae (in Latin). Vol. Tom. II. Leipzig: G. Engelmann.
- Zenker, Barbara (1964). Die Mitglieder des Kardinalkollegiums von 1130 bis 1159 (in German). Würzburg.
