= Desiderius of Santa Prassede =

Italian cardinal

Desiderius was a Roman Catholic cardinal, and cardinal-priest of the titular church of Santa Prassede in Rome.

He was a Roman, according to Barbara Zenker.

He is first noticed as a Subdeacon of the Holy Roman Church, subscribing to a papal bull, on 11 May 1112, in favor of the abbess of St Agnes and St Costanza outside the walls of Rome.

== Cardinal ==
He was named a cardinal-priest, probably in 1115, since he first subscribes a private document on 2 January 1116, the perpetual rent of a vineyard belonging to the church of St Prassede. His earliest surviving papal subscription occurs on 24 May 1116, followed by signatures on 23 November, 21 December and 22 December.

== Papal election of 1118 ==
Pope Paschal II died in Rome on 21 January 1118. The meeting to elect his successor was held at the monastery of the Palladium (Santa Maria in Pallara, near the Arch of Titus and the Arch of Constantine) for reasons of security. Cardinal Desiderius was one of those present. During the enthronement ceremony, Cencius Frangipani and his supporters broke into the monastery, seized and abused the pope and others, and carried Gelasius off to one of their prisons. He was rescued, but, on the approach of Henry V to Rome, he fled to Gaeta. Desiderius is not mentioned in connection with the consecration of the new pope at Gaeta. Pope Gelasius was able to return to Rome in June, and, on 21 July 1118, Cardinal Desiderius sang Mass before Pope Gelasius and the cardinals in his titular church of St Prassede.

After Pope Gelasius fled Rome on 2 September 1118, Cardinal Desiderius functioned in Rome as a member of the curia, headed by the Vicar of Rome, Cardinal Petrus of Porto. His name appears on a curial decision with those of five other cardinals, in favor of the monastery of Santa Sofia in Benevento.

Pope Gelasius died at Cluny in Burgundy on 29 January 1119. Following his death, the ten cardinals who were present, after consultation with other prelates, Roman officials, and other Romans who were present, proceeded to an election, with the agreement that the name of the successful candidate would be sent to Rome for confirmation. Archbishop Guy of Vienne was elected on 2 February 1119. Within days, Cardinal Pietro Senex presided over the ratification by the Roman clergy of the election of Pope Calixtus II, which was sent to France in time for him to be enthroned in the cathedral of Vienne on 9 February 1119. Various cardinals in Rome sent supplementary letters, approving of the actions at Cluny. Cardinal Desiderius shared a letter with several of the cardinal-priests.

The new pope reached Rome on 3 June 1120. Cardinal Desiderius subscribed documents for him at the Lateran on 3 January 1121, 7 January, 14 January, 4 March and 17 April. On 17 April 1121, Pope Calixtus departed for the siege of Sutri, which was already being conducted by Cardinal Giovanni da Crema against the Henrician antipope Gregory VIII (Maurice Burdinus). Desiderius played no part in the expedition, nor did he form part of the papal retinue for Calixtus' southern tour from July 1121 to March 1122. On 17 November 1121, Cardinal Desiderius was in Rome, where he approved the perpetual rent (emphyteusis) of a vineyard owned by the church of S. Prassede. On 27 November 1121, he approved the perpetual lease of vineyard land belonging to the Church of S. Prassede.

Desiderius subscribed again for Pope Calixtus at the Lateran on 6 April 1123, and on 1 April 1124. When Honorius II (Lamberto Scanabecchi) became pope in December 1124, he subscribed for the new pope occasionally from 7 March 1125 to 10 April 1129.

== Schism of 1130 ==
After dawn on the morning of 14 February 1130, the senior-cardinal bishop, Petrus Senex, met with the other cardinals, the important Roman clergy, the magistrates and leading citizens, and the people of Rome, in anticipation of the possible announcement of the death of the pope. They were prepared to give Honorius II a funeral befitting a pope. The meeting took place at the church of S. Marco, at the bottom of the steps to the Capitol, the titular church of Cardinal Bonifacio, which was also convenient for the Pierleoni, whose houses were nearby. They had not yet heard that Honorius had already died near sundown on the previous day, that he had been hastily buried in private, and that five cardinals held an uncanonical midnight election of Gregory Papareschi, whom they named Innocent II. At dawn, they dug up the body of the dead pope, carried it to the Lateran, buried it, and enthroned Innocent II. The historian of medieval Rome, Ferdinand Gregorovius states, "The proceeding was entirely contrary to law, and Gregory's action was altogether uncanonical. When those gethered at S. Marco heard of the doings at the Lateran, they began their own electoral meeting, in the light of the coup-d-état which was underway. Cardinal Desiderius gave his vote to Cardinal Pietro Pierleoni, who became Pope Anacletus II. Anacletus was acclaimed as pope by a large majority of the cardinals, clergy, magistrates, nobles, and people of Rome. Desiderius was one of cardinals who signed the official notice of the election sent to the Emperor Lothair.

His latest subscription, which was given for Innocent II, occurs on 21 June 1138. From 3 April to 8 April 1139, Pope Innocent held a council at the Lateran, attended, according to Otto of Frising, by more than a thousand prelates. During the council, all of the appointments of Anacletus II were declared null and void. Otto believed that the partisans of Anacletus were anathematized. It is not known whether Cardinal Desiderius was still alive, to be deposed and anathematized, or whether he was already dead.

== Bibliography ==
- Brixius, Johannes M. (1912). Die Mitglieder des Kardinalkollegiums von 1130–1181 (in German). Berlin.
- Fedele, P. (1904), "Tabularium S. Praxedis," (in Italian) Archivio della R. Società di storia patria 27 (1904), pp. 27-78.
- Hüls, Rudolf (1977). Kardinäle, Klerus und Kirchen Roms: 1049–1130 (in German). Bibliothek des Deutschen Historischen Instituts in Rom. ISBN 978-3-484-80071-7.
- Jaffé, Philippus (1885). Regesta pontificum Romanorum ab condita Ecclesia ad annum post Christum natum MCXCVIII (in Latin). Vol. Tomus primus (second ed.). Leipzig: Veit.
- Klewitz, Hans-Walter (1957). Reformpapsttum und Kardinalkolleg. Die Entstehung des Kardinalkollegiums. Studien über die Wiederherstellung der römischen Kirche in Süditalien durch das Reformpapsttum. Das Ende des Reformpapsttums (in German). Hermann Gentner Verlag, Darmstadt.
- Watterich, J. B. M. (1862). Pontificum Romanorum qui fuerunt inde ab exeunte saeculo IX usque ad finem saeculi XIII vitae: ab aequalibus conscriptae (in Latin). Vol. Tom. II. Leipzig: G. Engelmann.
- Zenker, Barbara (1964). Die Mitglieder des Kardinalkollegiums von 1130 bis 1159 (in German). Würzburg.
