= Gregorio Albergati =

12th-century Italian cardinal

Gregorius was a 12th century Roman Catholic Cardinal, and Cardinal-priest of the titulus of San Lorenzo in Lucina in Rome. A remark by Hugh the Chanter of York appears to indicate that he was a native of Siena. Rudolf Hüls, however, notes that Hugh might have mistaken Gregory of San Lorenzo and Gregory of Santa Prisca. Alfonso Chacón (Ciaconius) calls him Gregorius de Ceccano, a Hernician of the diocese of Aquino. Lorenzo Cardella says that Gregorius was born in Ceccano in the diocese of Sora, "da nobilissima famiglia". There is no evidence whatever that Gregorius of San Lorenzo was a member of the Albergati family of Bologna.

== Cardinal ==
Gregorius was a generous donor, at least in spiritual terms, to the hospital being founded between 1114 and 1116 by Bishop Guido of Pavia.

On 23 November 1116, he subscribed a papal document for Pope Paschal II at the papal residence in Trastevere.

=== Papal election of 1118 ===
Cardinal Gregorius was one of the participants in the papal election of 24 January 1118. Pope Paschal died on 21 January 1118. Cardinal Giovanni Gaetani was elected pope Gelasius II, though he was arrested during the enthronement ceremonies and imprisoned in a prison of the Frangebani. Though liberated by the Romans, he was forced to flee Rome because of the violence of the Frangipani and the approach of the army of the Emperor Henry V. Gelasius took refuge in Gaeta, where he was consecrated a bishop and enthroned by three cardinal-bishops, Lamberto of Ostia, Pietro of Porto, and Vitalis of Albano. The papal court returned to Rome early in July, after the withdrawal of Henry V, but factional fighting in Rome forced them to flee again at the end of August. Cardinal Gregorius is not mentioned in connection with any of the events of Gaeta, Capua, Rome or Pisa, to which Pope Gelasius fled on 2 September.

=== Papal election of 1119 ===
Following the death of Pope Gelasius II at Cluny on 29 January 1119, the ten cardinals who were present, after consultation with other prelates, Roman officials, and other Romans were present, proceeded to an election, with the agreement that the name of the successful candidate would be sent to Rome for confirmation. Archbishop Guy of Vienne was elected on 2 February 1119. Within days, Cardinal Pietro Senex, the papal Vicar of Rome, presided over the ratification by the Roman clergy of the election of Pope Calixtus II, which was sent to France in time for him to be enthroned in the cathedral of Vienne on 9 February 1119. Cardinal Gregory was not present at the ratification assembly, and did not sign the electoral confirmation. He was, however, one of a group of cardinal-priests who had not been present who immediately wrote to the electors at Cluny, in February 1119, expressing their approval and adherence.

By December 1119, Cardinal Gregorius was in France, where he appeared at the papal court when it was staying temporarily in Auxerre. He is probably the Gregorius presbiter cardinalis who, along with Abbot Pontius of Cluny, "vice fungentes Domini papae Calixti", settled the dispute between the monks of S. Blaise and the Church of Basel, on 1 April 1120.

Pope Calixtus and the papal court reached Rome on 3 June 1120. In mid-July the papal court set off on a tour of south-central Italy, which lasted until mid-December; its purpose was to secure the important papal city of Benevento, and to seek the renewal of the oaths of fealty of the Norman rulers. Cardinal Gregorius was with the pope and ten other cardinals in Benevento in October 1120. Back in Rome in 1121, Gregory subscribed papal documents from time to time between 3 January and 17 April, when the pope set off for the siege of Sutri and the capture of Maurice Burdinus, the antipope Gregory VIII. Cardinal Gregorius subscribed documents occasionally in 1122 and 1123.

In July 1124, Cardinal Gregorius was papal legate in Milan, where he subscribed a privilege granted by Archbishop Olricus.

Cardinal Gregorius' latest known subscription, "Gregorius presbiter cardinalis tituli Lucinae", took place at the Lateran on 28 November 1125. His successor at S. Lorenzo in Lucina, Cardinal Anselmus, first appears in surviving subscriptions on 7 May 1128.

== Bibliography ==
- Hüls, Rudolf (1977). Kardinäle, Klerus und Kirchen Roms: 1049–1130 (in German). Bibliothek des Deutschen Historischen Instituts in Rom. ISBN 978-3-484-80071-7.
- Jaffé, Philippus (1885). Regesta pontificum Romanorum ab condita Ecclesia ad annum post Christum natum MCXCVIII (in Latin). Vol. Tomus primus (second ed.). Leipzig: Veit.
- Klewitz, Hans-Walter (1957). Reformpapsttum und Kardinalkolleg. Die Entstehung des Kardinalkollegiums. Studien über die Wiederherstellung der römischen Kirche in Süditalien durch das Reformpapsttum. Das Ende des Reformpapsttums (in German). Hermann Gentner Verlag, Darmstadt.
- Watterich, J. B. M. (1862). Pontificum Romanorum qui fuerunt inde ab exeunte saeculo IX usque ad finem saeculi XIII vitae: ab aequalibus conscriptae (in Latin). Vol. Tom. II. Leipzig: G. Engelmann.
