= 1118 papal election =

Election of Catholic Pope Gelasius II

Papal election January 1118

Dates and location
- 24 January 1118; Santa Maria in Pallara, Rome

Key officials
- Protopriest: Boniface
- Protodeacon: Giovanni Coniulo

Elected pope
- Giovanni Coniulo; Name taken: Gelasius II
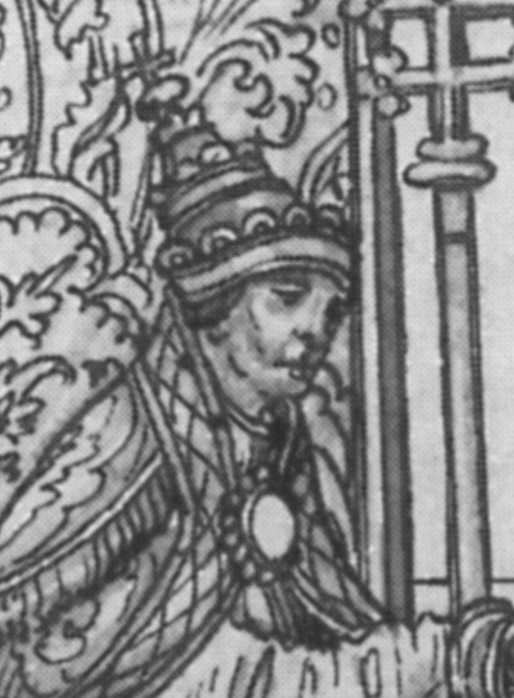

A papal election was held on 24 January 1118 to choose the successor for Paschal II, who died in Rome on 21 January after an 18-year pontificate. Gelasius II was elected as his successor. The election happened during the Investiture Controversy, a conflict between supporters of the papacy and those of the Holy Roman emperor. The election was held under the threat of possible violence due to the controversy. The cardinal electors took refuge in the Benedictine monastery, Santa Maria in Pallara, during the election. Within minutes of his election as pope, Gelasius II was attacked and imprisoned by the Frangipani faction, supporters of the emperor. Gelasius managed to escape, but at the emperor's arrival with his army, he fled Rome and never returned.

== Cardinal-electors ==
The papal bull entitled, In nomine Domini, issued by Nicholas II in 1059, declared that, to choose the successor upon the death of the incumbent pope, the cardinal-bishops would discuss and present the name of a suitable candidate, and the cardinals would subsequently ratify the nomination.

Information regarding the cardinals during the election was compiled over 12 years later by Pandulf of Pisa, cardinal-priest of Santi Cosma e Damiano. The account is not complete. Indeed, some historians have pointed out the inaccuracy of Pandulf's account, including his list of electors, given his support for Anacletus II (1130–1138), who made him a cardinal.

Pandulf states that the election was attended by 49 cardinals: four bishops, 27 priests, and 18 deacons. Still, the account mentions the names of only 35 cardinals (four bishops, 20 priests, and 11 deacons), including the elected Gelasius. (Note: Alphonso Chacón (1530/40–1599) tried to establish a full list of the names in his posthumously published work, Vitae et res gestae Pontificum Romanorum et SRE Cardinalium, but he included names of cardinals who were appointed only by later popes (Ugo Lectifredo of S. Vitale, Romano S. Maria in Portico, Pietro S. Adriano); for many, their presence at the event is undocumented (Giovanni S. Callisto [but San Callisto became a titular church only in 1517], Pietro Vuilhelmus S. Sabina [undocumented], Ducale of Ss. IV Coronati [undocumented], Crisostomo of S. Ciriaco, Amico of Ss. Vito e Modesto). Two cardinals were listed twice (Teobaldo Boccapecora as a deacon of S. Maria Nuova, and as a priest of S. Anastasia to which he had in fact been promoted in 1123; and Divizo from cardional priest of Ss. Silvestro Martino to bishop of Tusculum.)) However, the status of the cardinals, priests, and deacons was unclear from the Pandulf account. (Note: Klewitz presents 23 priests and 16 deacons; Furst presents 18 presbyters and deacons 12. This article presents a list according to the analysis of Hüls, pp. 63–64.) In addition, several cardinals mentioned by Pandulf only obtained that position when elevated after the papal election by a later pope. (Note: It was Pope Callistus II (1119—1124) who created Amico of S. Croce, Gerardo S. Prisca and Sigizo of S. Sisto, and perhaps Gregorio S. Eustachio. Stefano S. Lucia in Silice was appointed only by Honorius II (1124—1130). Cardinal S. Prisca was then Gregorio and Gerardo, although the vacancy is not completely excluded. In addition, Teobaldo Boccapeccora was mentioned by Pandulf as cardinal-priest of S. Anastasia, even though he was still a deacon of S. Maria Nuova (elevated in 1121/22). Klewitz, with the exception of the last case, approved the names given by Pandulf.) Other chroniclers also made incomplete accounts.

According to the work of Rudolf Huls, the College of Cardinals had only 41 members as of January 1118: 6 bishops, 20 priests, and 15 deacons, of which the following 36 participated in the election: (Note: This article presents a list according to the analysis of Hüls, pp. 63–64.)

=== Cardinal Bishops ===
- Crescenzio (nominated cardinal in 1100) - Cardinal-bishop of Sabina
- Pietro Senex (1102) - Cardinal-bishop of Porto
- Lamberto Scannabecchi - Cardinal-bishop of Ostia
- Vitalis (1111) - Cardinal-bishop of Albano

=== Cardinal Priests ===
- Boniface (1100) - Cardinal-Priest of S. Marco; prior cardinalium
- Benedict (1102) - Cardinal-Priest of S. Pietro in Vincoli
- Anastasius (1102) - Cardinal-Priest of S. Clemente
- Divizo (1103) - Cardinal-Priest of Ss. Silvestro e Martino
- Joannes (1106) - Cardinal-Priest of S. Cecilia
- Theobaldus (1111) - Cardinal-Priest of Ss. Giovanni e Paolo
- Rainerius (1111) - Cardinal-Priest of Ss. Marcellino e Pietro
- Corrado della Suburra (1114) - Cardinal-Priest of S. Pudenziana
- Gregory (1115) - Cardinal-Priest of S. Prisca
- Desiderius (c. 1115) - Cardinal-Priest of S. Prassede
- Deusdedit (1116) - Cardinal-Priest of S. Lorenzo in Damaso
- Gregorius (1116) - Cardinal-Priest of San Lorenzo in Lucina
- Giovanni, O.S.B. Cas. (1116) - Cardinal-Priest of S. Eusebio
- Guido, O.S.B. (1116) - Cardinal-Priest of S. Balbina
- Giovanni da Crema (1116) - Cardinal-Priest of S. Crisogono
- Saxo de Anagnia (1116) - Cardinal-Priest of S. Stefano al Monte Celio
- Petrus Pisanus (1113) - Cardinal-Priest of S. Susanna
- Amico, O.S.B. Cas. (1117) - Cardinal-Priest of Ss. Nereo ed Achilleo; Abbot of S. Vincenzo al Volturno

=== Cardinal Deacons ===
- Giovanni Gaetani, O.S.B. Cas. (1088) - Cardinal-Deacon of S. Maria in Cosmedin; Cardinal-protodeacon. (Note: Cardinal Giovanni was the son of Giovanni Coniulo. He was not a member of the Gaetani family, though Pandulphus Pisanus calls him Ioannes Gaietanus (Giovanni da Gaeta). He had a nephew, however, Crescenzio Gaetani, who was a member of the comitial family. P. Fedele, "Le famiglie di Anacleto II e di Gelasio II," Archivio della società romana di storia patria 27 (1904), 434-440. Hüls, p. 232, note 2.)
- Gregorio, OSB (c. 1108) - Cardinal-Deacon of S. Eustachio
- Romoaldo (1109) - Cardinal-Deacon of S. Maria in Via Lata
- Gregorio Gaetano (1109) - Cardinal-Deacon of S. Lucia in Septisolio
- Aldo da Ferentino (1109) - Cardinal-Deacon of Ss. Sergio e Bacco
- Teobaldo Boccapecora (1109) - Cardinal-Deacon of S. Maria Nuova
- Roscemanno, O.S.B.Cas. (1112) - Cardinal-Deacon of S. Giorgio in Velabro
- Pietro Pierleoni, OSBCluny (1113) - Cardinal-Deacon of Ss. Cosma e Damiano
- Oderisio di Sangro, O.S.B.Cas. (1112) - Cardinal-Deacon of S. Agata
- Comes (1113) - Cardinal-Deacon of S. Maria in Aquiro
- Gregorio Papareschi (1116) - Cardinal-Deacon of S. Angelo in Pescheria
- Crisogono (1117) - Cardinal-Deacon of S. Nicola in Carcere (Note: Crisogono was papal Bibliothecarius. Pandulfus Pisanus states he was a creation of Pope Paschal II ["Vita Gelasii papae", in Watterich II, p. 93]. He is probably the Chrysogonus, a papal notary in December, 1112, who acted as a datary in 1114 on Cardinal Iohannes Gaetani's behalf. He subscribed a bull as Deacon of S. Nicolai in carcere Tulliano on 20 April 1117. Hüls, p. 240.)
- Enrico da Mazara (1117) - Cardinal-Deacon of S. Teodoro; Dean of the collegiate church of Mazara del Vallo, Sicily
- Crescenzio di Anagni (1117) - Cardinal-Deacon (Note: Crescenzio had been a papal secretary to Paschal II, who named him a cardinal-deacon. Hüls, pp. 183-184, 246. Watterich, p. 93. There is no evidence for his presence at the election of Pope Gelasius. He is not named on Pandulfus Pisanus' list.)

Two subdeacons were in attendance, Nicholas, Provost of the Choir School, and Amico O.S.B. (Cluny), Abbot of Saint Lawrence outside the Walls. (Note: Pandulf mistakenly marked Amico as Cardinal-priest of Santa Croce in Gerusalemme. He received this honor only from Callistus II. Hüls, p. 163. Ganzer, p. 69.)

=== Absent ===
It can be established that at least two cardinal-priests, two cardinal-bishops, and a cardinal-deacon were absent:

- Giovanni Marsicano, O.S.B. (1100) - Cardinal-bishop of Tusculum
- Kuno von Urach (1107) - Cardinal-bishop of Palestrina; papal legate in France
- Boso (1109) - Cardinal-priest of S. Anastasia; papal legate in Spain
- Ugone d'Alatri (1116) - Cardinal-priest of Santi Dodici Apostoli; Governor Monte Circeo
- Giovanni, O.S.B. (1073) - Cardinal-deacon of Santa Maria in Domnica; Abbot of Subiaco

== The choice of Gelasius II ==
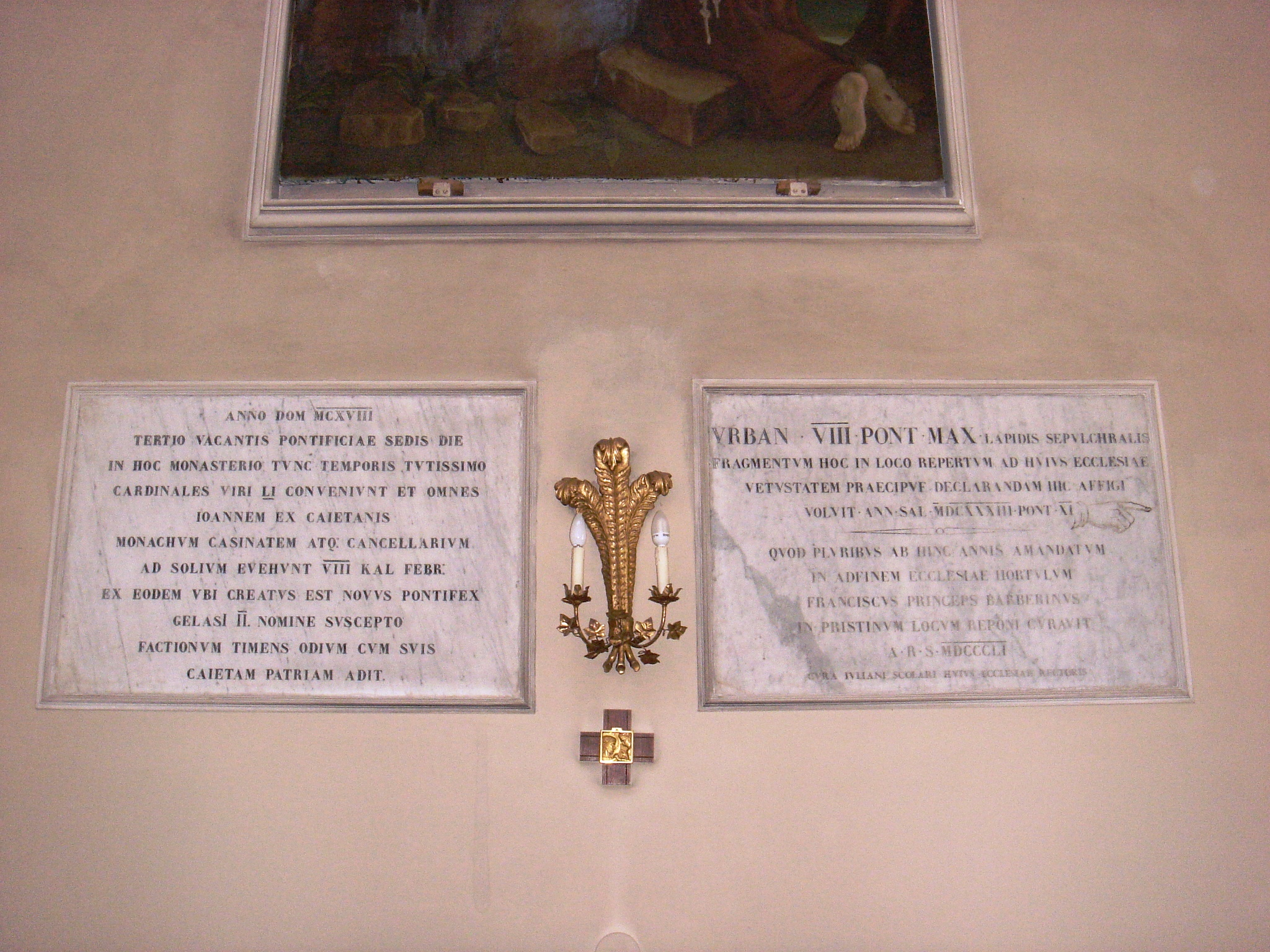
Plaque in San Sebastiano al Palatino marking the election of Caetani as Pope Gelasius II.

During his papacy, Paschal II waged the investiture controversy with Emperor Henry V, who had a considerable following among the aristocracy of Rome. From 6 to 11 March 1116, Paschal II presided over a general council at the Lateran Basilica, The leader of the anti-imperial opposition to Paschal's concessions to Henry was Cardinal Giovanni of Gaeta, the chancellor of the Holy Roman Church. In the council, Pope Paschal was forced to condemn his own privilegium. This was a concession that Paschal had granted to the emperor, allowing the emperor to invest bishops with his staff and ring of office. Paschal agreed to again anathematize any person who gave or received ecclesiastical titles from the hands of a layman, though he resisted the council's wish to anathematize the emperor. This action in the council by Paschal was a repudiation of the agreement he had previously reached with the emperor. It caused great offense and anger. After many representations to the pope, Henry marched on Rome. On 5 April 1117, supporters of the emperor forced Paschal to flee the Lateran palace. He spent his time at Montecassino, and then Benevento. There he held a synod, where he excommunicated the emperor's friend, Maurice Burdinus, the archbishop of Braga, who had been the go-between in recent negotiations. He returned to Rome to the Castel Sant'Angelo on 14 January 1118, where he died on 21 January.

After his death, the Cardinals took refuge in the Palladium (S. Maria in Pallara), a Benedictine monastery on the Palatine Hill, fearing the violence of supporters of the emperor. The meetings were presided over by Cardinal Petrus of Porto. He waited the three canonical days before beginning the election, having also sent a swift messenger summoning Cardinal Giovanni Gaetani, who was at Montecassino. (Note: According to Pandulphus Pisanus, "Vita Gelasii II", in: Watterich, Tomus II (Lipsiae 1862) p. 94: "Interim autem, Paschali papa defuncto, venerabilis pater dominus Petrus Portuensis episcopus, qui primatum post papam per longa jam diutius tempora detinuerat, cumque eo omnes presbyteri ac diaconi cardinales de eligendo Pontifice, et in commune communiter, et singulariter singuli pertractare coeperunt pro domino cancellario in monasterio Cassinensi commanente.") On 24 January 1118, three days after the customary prayers and devotions, the electors unanimously chose Cardinal Giovanni Coniulo from Gaeta for the papacy, the cardinal-deacon of Santa Maria in Cosmedin and Chancellor of the Holy See. On election, he adopted the papal name Gelasius II.

== Aftermath ==
Shortly after his election, as the clergy and people were celebrating Gelasius' enthronement, Cenzio Frangipani, a supporter of the emperor, (Note: Gregorovius IV, p. 378, speculates, without evidence, that Frangipani was enraged because some of the cardinals had promised him that a candidate friendly to imperial interests would be elected.) whose house and headquarters were next door to S. Maria in Pallara, broke into the church with his followers and assaulted the pope. The pope was seized and carried off to Frangipani's house, where he was chained and imprisoned.

Pope Gelasius II was freed by a popular uprising led by Peter, the Prefect of Rome. However, as the emperor Henry and his army approached the city, Gelasius fled from Rome to his native Gaeta on March 1, where he was ordained as a priest on 9 March 1118. He was consecrated a bishop and enthroned on 10 March. Pandulphus Pisanus was ordained a lector and an exorcist on the same day. He then fled to Pisa and ultimately to France, where he remained until his death at the Abbey of Cluny on 29 January 1119. In his absence, the papal vicar in Rome was Cardinal Petrus, the Bishop of Porto.

== Bibliography ==
- Furst, C. G. (1966). Kennen Wir die Wahlern Gelsius' II?, In: Festschrift Karl Pivec. Zum 60 Geburtstag von gewidmet Kollegen, edited by Anton Haidacher, Hans Eberhard Mayer, ed. Sprachwissenschaftliches Institut der Leopold-Franzens-Universität, 1966, pp. 69–80. (in German)
- Gregorovius, Ferdinand (1896). History of Rome in the Middle Ages. Volume IV. 2, second edition, revised (London: George Bell, 1896) [Book VIII chapter 2], pp. 377–389.
- Hüls, Rudolf (1977). Kardinal, Klerus und Kirchen Roms: 1049–1130, Tübingen: Max Niemeyer 1977. (in German)
- Jaffé, Philipp, Regesta Pontificum Romanorum ab condita ecclesia ad annum p. Chr. n. 1198 (in Latin); 2nd ed. by S. Löwenfeld, F. Kaltenbrunner, P. Ewald Vol 1. Leipzig, 1888.
- Klewitz, H. W. (1957). Reformpapsttum und Kardinalkolleg, Darmstadt 1957. (in German)
- Robinson, I. S. (1990). The Papacy 1073–1198. Continuity and Innovations, Cambridge University Press 1990.
- Watterich, J. B. M. (1862). Pontificum Romanorum qui fuerunt inde ab exeunte saeculo IX usque ad finem saeculi XIII vitae: ab aequalibus conscriptae (in Latin). Vol. Tom. II. Leipzig: G. Engelmann.
