= Bonifacius of S. Marco =

12th-century Roman Catholic prelate

Bonifacius (died in 1130 or later) was a Roman Catholic Cardinal and Cardinal-priest of the titulus of San Marco. In 1111, he was one of the cardinals captured by King Henry V at what was supposed to be his coronation, and was held prisoner near Rome along with the pope for sixty-one days. He was forced to subscribe to the oath taken by Pope Paschal II, according to the dictates of King Henry. He was then one of the cardinals who opposed the agreements struck by Paschal with Henry in the Lateran synod of 1112. He was not one of the cardinals who followed popes Gelasius, Calixtus, or Honorius on their travels. In the contested papal election of 1130, he supported Pope Anacletus II.

== Paschal II ==
According to the seniority in signing documents principle (Anciennitätsprinzip) developed by Rudolf Hüls, Bonifacius should have been named a cardinal by 1100. He first appears, however, in 1111, when, on 16 February, King Henry V took captive the pope and sixteen cardinals, including Cardinal Bonifacius; they were held captive for sixty-one days, while Henry pressed the pope to agree to his solution to the investiture controversy. On 18 April, at Ponte Mammolo on the Anio River, Bonifacius was one of the cardinals ordered by Pope Paschal II to sign the oath which the pope was offering under duress to King Henry V.

Paschal attempted to placate Henry, but he only made matters worse. Though asserting the separation of church and state in the institution to benefices, Paschal granted the emperor a privilegium in the matter of investiture. Pressure from inside the empire and outside mounted on Paschal to summon a council, whose expressed purpose would be to annul the "privilege', which was a grave setback for the Gregorian reform movement. Cardinal Bonifacius of S. Marco was one of more than one hundred prelates who participated in the Lateran council in the following year, on 18—23 March 1112. The "privilege" was soundly condemned.

Pope Paschal II died in Rome, on 21 January 1118.

== Gelasius II and Calixtus II ==
The meeting to elect a successor to Paschal II took place at the monastery of the Palladium (Santa Maria in Pallara, near the Arch of Titus and the Arch of Constantine) for reasons of security. Cardinal Bonifacius of S. Marco was one of those present. During the enthronement ceremony, Cencius Frangipani and his supporters broke into the monastery, seized and abused the pope and others, and carried Gelasius off to one of their prisons. He was rescued, but, on the approach of Henry V to Rome, he fled to Gaeta, to Capua, and then to Pisa. Bonifacius is not mentioned in connection with the consecration of the new pope at Gaeta, or in the flight to Pisa and France. He was evidently still in Rome in February 1119, when he was present at a public meeting at the church of S. Giovanni on the island, where the cardinals, clergy, magistrates, and people acclaimed the new pope, Calixtus II, and he signed the confirmation of the election by the cardinals and higher clergy of Rome that was sent to Cluny. He was one of the authors of a letter to the electors of the new pope, Calixtus II, in Cluny. Pope Calixtus, after holding several councils and synods in France, arrived in Rome on 3 June 1120. On July 16, he began a tour of south Italy, from which he did not return to Rome until early December. Cardinal Bonifacius did not join the papal retinue, apparently, and therefore there are no subscriptions by his hand in 1119 or 1120. He did subscribe regularly to papal documents at the Lateran, from 3 January to 17 April 1121. On that same day, Pope Calixtus and his retinue departed for Sutri, where the antipope Gregory VIII (Maurice Burdinus) was already being besieged by Cardinal Giovanni da Crema. Bonifacius is not mentioned either in connection with the siege, or with the deposition and punishment of Burdinus after his capture.

In March 1123, Pope Calixtus held a council at the Lateran. He described the council in a letter to Bishop Odelric of Constanz, to which thirty-three cardinals subscribed, but not Cardinal Bonifacius.

In 1124, Bonifacius subscribed again at the Lateran from 1 April to 26 May. In 1125, he subscribed from 4 to 6 May.

== Honorius II ==
In 1125, he was appointed by Honorius II to act as judge in a dispute between the Provost of the cathedral chapter of Città di Castello and the abbot of the monastery of San Salvatore de Monte Acuto, over the property of Guicciards, son of Albertini; he traveled to Castello, and was resident at the church of San Gregorio, where the case was settled in the presence of the bishop.

In 1127, Cardinal Bonifacius of S. Marco became involved in a dispute, which eventually reached the papal audience hall for a decision, with both Pope Honorius and twenty-three cardinals. The Archconfraternity of the Holy Cross of S. Marco was accused of usurping the title and precedence of the Archconfraternity of the Holy Cross of the Basilica of the XII Apostles. In the documents, Bonifacius is referred to as prior cardinalium (protopriest).

== Anacletus II ==
When Honorius died, late in the afternoon of 13 February 1130, the five cardinals gathered around him did not inform the cardinals of the Pierleoni faction that the pope had died. Neither did they inform the magistrates of the city of Rome, who only learned of the fact when they assembled after dawn at the church of S. Marco to pay a collective call on the pope, expecting his death or imminent demise. After nightfall, the body of the dead pope was buried in the cloister of S. Gregorio and S. Andrea, by several laymen, without a funeral service. Cardinal Petrus Senex stated firmly, "No mention can be made about a successor until the pope has been buried."

During the night of 13/14 February, the cardinals inside the monastery held a meeting at which they elected Cardinal Gregory Papareschi pope. Cardinal Petrus of S. Susanna, who was present and in outraged disagreement with their actions, had a tart rebuke for the cardinals: "They gathered themselves together at some altar in the darkness, and, wishing to claim the title to an evil deed, they fabricated for themselves the deacon of S. Angelo as an idol in their rash boldness of zeal." Gregorovius states, "The proceeding was entirely contrary to law, and Gregory's action was altogether uncanonical.

At dawn, the body of Honorius was dug up again, and carried along with Papareschi to the Lateran Basilica. They were accompanied by the laymen of the Frangipani faction and the faction's cardinals. The body was buried again, in the Lateran, with a full funeral, and Papareschi was consecrated a bishop and enthroned as Innocent II.

After dawn, the senior-cardinal bishop, Petrus Senex, met with the other cardinals, the important Roman clergy, the magistrates and leading citizens, and the people of Rome, in anticipation of the possible announcement of the death of the pope. They were prepared to give Honorius II a funeral befitting a pope. The meeting took place at the church of S. Marco, at the bottom of the steps to the Capitol, the titular church of Cardinal Bonifacio, which was also convenient for the Pierleoni, whose houses were nearby. When they heard of the doings at the Lateran, they began their own electoral meeting, in the light of the coup-d-état which was underway. Cardinal Pietro gave his nomination and vote to Cardinal Pietro Pierleoni, who became Pope Anacletus II. Anacletus was acclaimed as pope by the cardinals (including Bonifacio), clergy, magistrates, nobles, and people of Rome. He was enthroned at S. Peter's Basilica on 15 February, and on 16 February he took possession of the Lateran.

Cardinal Bonifacio of S. Marco was the first cardinal to sign the letter of Pope Anacletus II's cardinals to the Emperor Lothair on 14 February 1130. Cardinal Guido de Castello was promoted from the deaconry of S. Maria in Via lata to the title of S. Marco by Innocent II in December 1133. This might indicate that Bonifacius was dead by that time.

== Bibliography ==
- Hüls, Rudolf (1977). Kardinäle, Klerus und Kirchen Roms: 1049–1130 (in German). Bibliothek des Deutschen Historischen Instituts in Rom. ISBN 978-3-484-80071-7.
- Jaffé, Philippus (1885). Regesta pontificum Romanorum ab condita Ecclesia ad annum post Christum natum MCXCVIII (in Latin). Vol. Tomus primus (second ed.). Leipzig: Veit.
- Klewitz, Hans-Walter (1957). Reformpapsttum und Kardinalkolleg. Die Entstehung des Kardinalkollegiums. Studien über die Wiederherstellung der römischen Kirche in Süditalien durch das Reformpapsttum. Das Ende des Reformpapsttums (in German). Hermann Gentner Verlag, Darmstadt.
- Watterich, J. B. M. (1862). Pontificum Romanorum qui fuerunt inde ab exeunte saeculo IX usque ad finem saeculi XIII vitae: ab aequalibus conscriptae (in Latin). Vol. Tom. II. Leipzig: G. Engelmann.
