= Theobaldus of Ss. Giovanni e Paolo =

Roman Catholic Cardinal

Theobaldus was a 12th century Roman Catholic Cardinal, and Cardinal-priest of the titulus of Ss. Giovanni e Paolo in Rome. He is given a second name, Teuto, by Alfonso Chacón, but Teuto was actually a predecessor of Theobaldus at Ss. Giovanni e Paolo.

== Early career ==
Nothing was known of Theobaldus' origins, family, education, or employment before he became a cardinal.

== Cardinal ==
Hans-Walter Klewitz believed that Theobaldus had first been Cardinal-deacon of Ss. Sergio e Bacco, basing his opinion on a signature of a papal bull of 24 November 1116. The actual holder of that deaconry, however, was Cardinal Aldo of Ferentino, who subscribed in that capacity from 1111 to 1121, making the identification of Theobaldus of Ss. Giovanni e Paolo and Theobaldus of Ss. Sergio and Bacco impossible. Moreover, Paul Fridolin Kehr had pointed out that the papal bull was a forgery.

His immediate predecessor at Ss. Giovanni e Paolo, Cardinal Anastasius, was still in office on 26 August 1109.

In February 1111, King Henry V came to Rome to demand his imperial coronation. On 12 February the ceremony took place at St. Peter's Basilica, and during the welcome at the door, the pope read out a decree, in which he repudiated lay investiture, and ordered all bishops to surrender their imperial fiefs to the emperor immediately and permanently. The king and the indignant bishops retired to discuss the shocking demand, and, as evening approached, the pope refused the coronation. After Mass, he and the cardinals were taken into custody by Henry's armed troops, and on 16 February, after a battle with the Romans in the Borgo, Henry and his captive prelates departed the city. The pope and sixteen cardinals were held captive for sixty-one days, while Henry pressed the pope to agree to his solution to the investiture controversy. On 11 April, at Ponte Mammolo on the Anio River, Theobaldus was one of the cardinals who were compelled to sign the papal promise to observe the agreement which Henry had drawn up. This was his first known papal subscription.

In attempting to placate Henry, however, Paschal only made matters worse. Though asserting the separation of church and state in the institution to benefices, Paschal granted the emperor a privilegium in the matter of investiture. The Gregorians saw the "Privilegium" as a betrayal of everything they had been doing to free the Church from the State, though numerous others saw it as a betrayal and a fatal weakness in the pope. Pressure from inside the empire and outside mounted on Paschal to summon a council, whose expressed purpose would be to annul the "privilege'. More than one hundred bishops participated in the Lateran council in the following year, on 18—23 March 1112. The "privilege" was soundly condemned. Cardinal Theobaldus signed the acts of the council.

=== Election of 1118 ===
Cardinal Theobaldus participated in the election of Cardinal Giovanni Gaetani as Pope Gelasius II on 24 January 1118. The electoral meeting took place at the monastery of the Palladium (Santa Maria in Pallara, near the Arch of Titus and the Arch of Constantine) for reasons of security. Cardinal Theobaldus was one of those present. During the enthronement ceremony, Cencius Frangipani and his supporters broke into the monastery, seized and abused the pope and others, and carried Gelasius off to one of their prisons. He was rescued, but, on the approach of Henry V to Rome, he fled to Gaeta, to Capua, to Pisa, and then to France. Cardinal Theobaldus is not mentioned in any of those places; apparently he remained in Rome.

=== Election of 1119 ===
Pope Gelasius died at Cluny in Burgundy on 29 January 1119. Following his death, the ten cardinals who were present, after consultation with other prelates, Roman officials, and other Romans who were present, proceeded to an election, with the agreement that the name of the successful candidate would be sent to Rome for confirmation. Archbishop Guy of Vienne was elected on 2 February 1119. Within days, Cardinal Pietro Senex presided over the ratification by the Roman clergy of the election of Pope Calixtus II, which was sent to France in time for him to be enthroned in the cathedral of Vienne on 9 February 1119. Various cardinals in Rome sent supplementary letters, approving of the actions at Cluny. Cardinal Theobaldus shared a letter with several of the cardinal-priests.

Cardinal Theobaldus subscribed documents for Pope Calixtus at the Lateran from 3 January to 17 April 1121. In April 1121, Cardinal Giovanni da Crema led the advance party to establish the siege of Sutri, where the failed antipope, Gregory VIII (Maurice Burdinus) had his headquarters, and from which he was conducting guerilla warfare on the neighborhood. Pope Calixtus followed along shortly thereafter, and, in an eight-day campaign, Sutri was forced to turn over the antipope and surrender. On 27 April 1121, Pope Calixtus wrote to the bishops of France from Sutri, announcing the capture of Burdinus and the end of the siege. Cardinal Theobaldus is not mentioned as having taken part.

Pope Calixtus then embarked on n inspection tour of southern Italy; he held a synod at Cotrone, and the names of the papal party are given. Cardinal Theobaldus is not named, and probably remained in Rome.

His latest subscription took place on 6 April 1123. His successor, Cardinal Aldericus, was already in office on 5 May 1125.

== Bibliography ==
- Hüls, Rudolf (1977). Kardinäle, Klerus und Kirchen Roms: 1049–1130 (in German). Bibliothek des Deutschen Historischen Instituts in Rom. ISBN 978-3-484-80071-7.
- Gregorovius, Ferdinand (1896). History of Rome in the Middle Ages. Volume IV. 2, second edition, revised (London: George Bell, 1896).
- Jaffé, Philippus (1885). Regesta pontificum Romanorum ab condita Ecclesia ad annum post Christum natum MCXCVIII (in Latin). Vol. Tomus primus (second ed.). Leipzig: Veit.
- Klewitz, Hans-Walter (1957). Reformpapsttum und Kardinalkolleg. Die Entstehung des Kardinalkollegiums. Studien über die Wiederherstellung der römischen Kirche in Süditalien durch das Reformpapsttum. Das Ende des Reformpapsttums (in German). Hermann Gentner Verlag, Darmstadt.
- Watterich, J. B. M. (1862). Pontificum Romanorum qui fuerunt inde ab exeunte saeculo IX usque ad finem saeculi XIII vitae: ab aequalibus conscriptae (in Latin). Vol. Tom. II. Leipzig: G. Engelmann.
