= Amicus, O.S.B. =

Amicus, O.S.B. was a 12th century Roman Catholic Cardinal, and Cardinal-priest of the titulus of Ss. Nereo ed Achilleo in Rome.

== Early career ==
Amicus began his ecclesiastical life as a monk in the Benedictine congregation of Montecassino. He rose to the rank of Dean (decanus) in the monastic hierarchy.

Between 1109 and 1117, he became abbot of the monastic community of S. Vincenzo al Volturno, "sito intus hanc... capuanum civitatem."

== Cardinal ==
During a papal visit to Montecassino in 1117, Pope Paschal II ordained Amicus a priest and appointed him Cardinal-priest of Ss. Nereo ed Achilleo in Rome. He apparently retained the post of abbot of S. Vincenzo until his death. Two months later, he was with the pope at Benevento, when, on 20 April 1117, he was the recipient of a papal privilege.

Cardinal Amicus participated in the election of Cardinal Giovanni Gaetani as Pope Gelasius II on 24 January 1118. The electoral meeting took place at the monastery of the Palladium (Santa Maria in Pallara, near the Arch of Titus and the Arch of Constantine) for reasons of security. Cardinal Amicus was one of those present. During the enthronement ceremony, Cencius Frangipani and his supporters broke into the monastery, seized and abused the pope and others, and carried Gelasius off to one of their prisons. He was rescued, but, on the approach of Henry V to Rome, he fled to Gaeta, to Capua, and then to Pisa.

Cardinal Amicus, O.S.B., played no part in the election of Pope Calixtus II in 1119. He was not at Cluny, and he was not in Rome. It may be assumed that he was at his abbey of S. Vincenzo.

He does not appear in the documentary record again until 1128. In March 1128 at Capua, he received a privilege for his monastery of S. Vincenzo granted by Prince Robert II of Capua, "in quo etiam dominus Amicus venerabilis cardinalis Sancte romane aecclesiae abbas pr(a)eesse dinoscitur...."

Cardinal Amicus, O.S.B.Casin., died on 4 January in the year after 1130.

There was another contemporary Cardinal Amicus, of the title of Santa Croce in Gerusalemme. Both cardinals named Amicus are listed by Cardinal Pandulfus Pisanus as having taken part in the election of Pope Gelasius II on 24 January 1118. He continues to appear in documents until April 1121.

== Bibliography ==
- Brixius, Johannes M. (1912). Die Mitglieder des Kardinalkollegiums von 1130–1181. Berlin.
- Gregorovius, Ferdinand (1896), History of Rome in the Middle Ages. Volume IV. part 2, second edition (London: George Bell, 1896).
- Ganzer, Klaus (1963). Die Entwicklung des auswärtigen Kardinalats im hohen Mittelalter. Ein Beitrag zur Geschichte des Kardinalkollegiums vom 11.bis 13. Jahrhundert. Bibliothek des Deutschen Historischen Instituts in Rom (in German). Tübingen: Max Niemeyer Verlag.
- Hüls, Rudolf (1977). Kardinäle, Klerus und Kirchen Roms: 1049–1130 (in German). Bibliothek des Deutschen Historischen Instituts in Rom. ISBN 978-3-484-80071-7.
- Jaffé, Philippus (1885). Regesta pontificum Romanorum ab condita Ecclesia ad annum post Christum natum MCXCVIII (in Latin). Vol. Tomus primus (second ed.). Leipzig: Veit.
- Klewitz, Hans-Walter (1957). Reformpapsttum und Kardinalkolleg. Die Entstehung des Kardinalkollegiums. Studien über die Wiederherstellung der römischen Kirche in Süditalien durch das Reformpapsttum. Das Ende des Reformpapsttums (in German). Hermann Gentner Verlag, Darmstadt.
- Watterich, J. B. M. (1862). Pontificum Romanorum qui fuerunt inde ab exeunte saeculo IX usque ad finem saeculi XIII vitae: ab aequalibus conscriptae (in Latin). Vol. Tom. II. Leipzig: G. Engelmann.
- Zenker, Barbara (1964). Die Mitglieder des Kardinalkollegiums von 1130 bis 1159 (in German). Würzburg.
