= Deusdedit of San Lorenzo in Damaso =

Deusdedit (died 1129/30) was the cardinal-priest of San Lorenzo in Damaso from 1116 until his death. He was named a cardinal by Pope Paschal II. Nothing is known of his life before he was a cardinal. He is not the canonist Balius Severinus Deusdedit, appointed cardinal priest of the Roman titular church Apostolorum in Eudóxia (St. Peter in Chains) by Pope Gregory VII.

Cardinal Deusdedit took part in the Papal election of Gelasius II, which took place in the walled monastic compound, the Palladium (S. Maria in Pallara), S. Maria in Pallara belonged to the Benedictine Congregation of Montecassino, and was the residence of Cardinal Giovanni of Gaeta (Joannes Gaetanus), the papal chancellor, who was also a Benedictine monk. Cardinal Giovanni Gaetani was elected pope on 24 January 1118. This election provoked unrest in Rome, and the papal court was forced to flee the troops of the Emperor Henry V on 2 March. On 12 April 1118, Cardinal Deusdedit is found at Capua with the pope. Leaving Capua on 18 April, the papal party was able to return to Rome on 5 July, but was driven out at the end of August. On 13 September, the party reached Pisa, where Cardinal Deusdedit subscribed documents on 13 September and 26 September.

Gelasius fled, eventually to the abbey of Cluny in France. He sent Deusdedit on a mission to Spain, which is where the cardinal was when the pope died at Cluny. He was unable therefore take part in the election of Calixtus II on 2 February 1119. The crossed to France by ship in the second half of October, but Deusdedit did not follow the pope beyond Maguelonne. On 18 November, at Maguelonne, the pope appointed him a nuncio to Spain, to invite the Spanish bishops to a church council which was to be held in France at Clermont-Ferrand on 1 March 1119.

In Spain, he met with Bishop Diego Gelmírez of Compostela, who eagerly embraced the idea of a trip to the papal court. He was planning on persuading the pope to elevate the status of his diocese to that of an archbishopric. The expedition to France of the cardinal, the bishop, and some of his canons, was frustrated, however, by the hatred of the king of Aragon for the kingdom of Leon and Castile. He refused free passage through his territory to the clerics; Bishop Diego was one of the guardians of the king of Castile, who was a minor. The king also accused Cardinal Deusdedit of attempting to smuggle large amounts of money across the Pyrenees. In the meantime, Diego made Cardinal Deusdedit a canon of the cathedral of Compostela, which carried with it the title of cardinal-priest (Note: It was only in 1567 that the title of "cardinal" was restricted to the Roman diocese. Prior to that it had been bestowed by other bishops on priests of local prominence.).

Before Cardinal Deusdedit was able to return to the papal court, Pope Gelasius contracted pleurisy at Mâcon, where he had held a council, and died in the monastery of Cluny on 29 January 1119. He was not present, therefore, on 2 February, when the cardinals, and clergy, and lay leaders of Rome elected Archbishop Guy of Vienne, who took the name Calixtus II. Calixtus shared the guardianship of his nephew, the young Alfonso VII of Castile, with Diego Gelmírez and Queen Mother Uracca. Calixtus was also uncle of the queen of France, and first-cousin of the king of England.

Deusdedit rejoined the papal court by 18 June 1119, when the pope was a St.-Gilles (S. Aegidius), on his way to Toulouse, where he held a church council on 8 July 1119. The cardinal signed documents while in Toulouse, on 14 and 15 July. He was also with the papal court at the Council of Reims in October 1119. He subscribed a document there on 1 November 1119.

In 1120, Deusdedit accompanied the pope in Italy. On 14 May, they were in Pisa, where he subscribed a document. He signed another at Volterra on 21 May. From 1121, he subscribes at the Lateran more regularly. In June 1121, he was at Paliano, a hilltop town east of Palestrina, though the pope spent the next month or more in the neighborhood of Tivoli. In November, the pope visited cities in south-east Italy, and on 10 November, he was at Taranto. He returned to Spain in December 1123 and was there until June 1124, visiting Santiago di Compostela, Braga, and Valladolid. He continued efforts to reform the clergy, and to resolve questions left unsettled after the legation of Cardinal Boso of Sant'Anastasia.

He continued with the Roman curia during the pontificate of Honorius II, but after 1124, his signature only appears on eleven surviving papal documents. (Note: Prominence or obscurity of a cardinal cannot be deduced from surviving signatures on papal documents. Their survival is quite haphazard.) His last known signature is on 19 April 1129, in the Lateran.

He does not appear in either party in the disputed election of 1130. It is assumed that he was dead.

== Sources ==
- Falque Rey, Emma (1994). Historian compostelana. Madrid: Ediciones Akal.
- Gregorovius, Ferdinand (1896), History of Rome in the Middle Ages. Volume IV. part 2, second edition (London: George Bell, 1896).
- Hüls, Rudolf (1977). Kardinal, Klerus und Kirchen Roms: 1049–1130. Tübingen: Max Niemeyer.
- Watterich, J. B. M. (1862). Pontificum Romanorum qui fuerunt inde ab exeunte saeculo IX usque ad finem saeculi XIII vitae: ab aequalibus conscriptae (in Latin). Vol. Tom. II. Leipzig: G. Engelmann.
