= Anastasius of S. Clemente =

Roman Catholic cardinal

Anastasius was a Roman Catholic Cardinal, and Cardinal-priest of the titulus of S. Clemente in Rome.

Anastasius' career began as a member of the papal court. He was made a iudex datus (judge) by Pope Urban II in a dispute over the ownership of the church of Castro Biccardi at Ferentino in the diocese of Troia.

== Cardinal ==
Cardinal Anastasius' earliest known subscription to a papal document occurs on 4 March 1102 at the Lateran. He also signed on 11 March.

In 1109, Pope Paschal II appointed a committee of curial cardinals, including Petrus Portuensis, Robertus of S. Eusebio, and Anastasius of S. Clemente, to investigate a transaction between Abbot Nicholas of S. Maria Criptoferrata and Cardinal Romanus of S. Prassede. The case was finally settled by Pope Eugenius III in 1148.

=== Henry V, Paschal II, and the investiture question ===
In February 1111, King Henry V came to Rome to demand his imperial coronation. On 12 February, the ceremony took place at St. Peter's Basilica, and during the welcome at the door, the pope read out a decree, in which he repudiated lay investiture, and ordered all bishops to surrender their imperial fiefs to the emperor immediately and permanently. The king and the indignant bishops retired to discuss the shocking demand, and, as evening approached, the pope refused the coronation. After Mass, he and the cardinals were taken into custody by Henry's armed troops, and on 16 February, after a battle with the Romans in the Borgo, Henry and his captive prelates departed the city. The pope and sixteen cardinals, including Cardinal Anastasius, were held captive for sixty-one days, while Henry pressed the pope to agree to his solution to the investiture controversy. On 18 April, at Ponte Mammolo on the Anio River, Anastasius was one of the cardinals who were compelled to sign the papal promise to observe the agreement which Henry had drawn up. He then attended the Lateran synod, which numerous papal legates, cardinals, and bishops pressured Pope Paschal to summon. At the synod, Pope Paschal was severely criticized for giving in to the emperor, and his "privilege" (Note: The "privilege" granted the emperor the right to invest a newly elected bishop with the ring and the staff of office before he was consecrated by the appropriate church officials.) granted to Henry V was cancelled. Cardinal Anastasius signed the Acta of the synod on 23 March 1112.

Two days after the synod, Cardinal Anastasius acted as a judge in the dispute between Abbot Albert of Sassovivo and Bishop Enrico of Spoleto. On 11 May 1112, he subscribed a document for Pope Paschal in favor of S. Agnes outside-the-walls in Rome.

In November 1112, Pope Paschal embarked on a trip to Benevento, which lasted until March 1113. Cardinal Anastasius was in the papal entourage, and subscribed documents at Benevento on 2 January, 13 February, and 15 February 1113. In October, he was with the papal court in Benevento again, and participated in a papal judicial sitting, where he gave evidence in the case. On The pope was in Benevento from May to September 1115; on 24 May 1115, in Benevento, Anastasius served as a judge. He was back in Rome, at the Lateran, on 17 and 27 November 1115, and in March 1116.

== Elections of 1118 and 1119 ==
Pope Paschal II died in Rome, on 21 January 1118. The meeting to elect his successor was held at the monastery of the Palladium (Santa Maria in Pallara, near the Arch of Titus and the Arch of Constantine) for reasons of security. Cardinal Anastasius of S. Clemente was one of those present. During the enthronement ceremony, Cencius Frangipani and his supporters broke into the monastery, seized and abused the pope and others, and carried Gelasius off to one of their prisons. He was rescued, but, on the approach of Henry V to Rome, he fled to Gaeta, to Capua, and then to Pisa. Anastasius is not mentioned in connection with the consecration of the new pope at Gaeta, or in the flight to Pisa and France. When Pope Gelasius died in France, at the abbey of Cluny, Anastasius was not present, nor was he present at the meeting in Rome which received the notification of the election of Pope Calixtus II and issued the Act of Confirmation of the election, but he was one of a group of cardinals who had not been present who immediately wrote to the electors at Cluny, in February 1119, expressing their approval and adherence.

Calixtus II arrived in Rome on 3 June 1120, and embarked on a trip to Benevento in mid-July. He was in Benevento from 8 August to the end of November. Cardinal Anastasius signed documents for him on 24 September and in October. He subsequently subscribed documents at the Lateran in 1123, 1124, and 1125.

Cardinal Anastasius' latest known subscription is dated 6 May 1125. His successor at S. Clemente, Cardinal Hubertus, subscribes for the first time on 28 March 1126.

Cardinal Anastasius was responsible for a restoration of his titular church, San Clemente.

== Bibliography ==
- Brixius, Johannes M. (1912). Die Mitglieder des Kardinalkollegiums von 1130–1181. Berlin.
- Hüls, Rudolf (1977). Kardinäle, Klerus und Kirchen Roms: 1049–1130 (in German). Bibliothek des Deutschen Historischen Instituts in Rom. ISBN 978-3-484-80071-7.
- Jaffé, Philippus (1885). Regesta pontificum Romanorum ab condita Ecclesia ad annum post Christum natum MCXCVIII (in Latin). Vol. Tomus primus (second ed.). Leipzig: Veit.
- Klewitz, Hans-Walter (1957). Reformpapsttum und Kardinalkolleg. Die Entstehung des Kardinalkollegiums. Studien über die Wiederherstellung der römischen Kirche in Süditalien durch das Reformpapsttum. Das Ende des Reformpapsttums (in German). Hermann Gentner Verlag, Darmstadt.
- Watterich, J. B. M. (1862). Pontificum Romanorum qui fuerunt inde ab exeunte saeculo IX usque ad finem saeculi XIII vitae: ab aequalibus conscriptae (in Latin). Vol. Tom. II. Leipzig: G. Engelmann.
- Zenker, Barbara (1964). Die Mitglieder des Kardinalkollegiums von 1130 bis 1159 (in German). Würzburg.
