= Rainerius of Ss. Marcellino e Pietro =

Rainerius was a 12th-century Roman Catholic Cardinal, and Cardinal-priest of the titulus of Ss. Marcellino e Pietro in Rome.

== Early career ==
Nothing is known of Rainerius' origins, family, education, or employment before he became a cardinal.

The date of his appointment is not attested, and has been variously assigned. Scholars in the 17th and 18th centuries reported that he had been one of the cardinals at the Council of Guastalla in October 1106. This claim is not substantiated by documentary evidence. It is also inconsistent with the Anciennitätprinzip developed by Rudolf Hüls, which indicates that Rainerius' appointment should have been in 1110 or 1111.

Salvador Miranda supports a date of appointment of 1117, basing his view on the Annuaire Pontifical Catholique 1928. He cites Jaffé for Rainerius' subscriptions to papal documents in 1121, but he misses Jaffe's reference to subscriptions in 1114 and 1115. Miranda also states, "He may be the same as Cardinal Raniero (1099)," a self-contradictory remark. His dating is not acceptable.

== Cardinal ==
In February 1111, King Henry V came to Rome to demand his imperial coronation. On 12 February, the ceremony took place at St. Peter's Basilica, and during the welcome at the door, the pope read out a decree, in which he repudiated lay investiture, and ordered all bishops to surrender their imperial fiefs to the emperor immediately and permanently. The king and the indignant bishops retired to discuss the shocking demand, and, as evening approached, the pope refused the coronation. After Mass, he and the cardinals were taken into custody by Henry's armed troops, and on 16 February, after a battle with the Romans in the Borgo, Henry and his captive prelates departed the city. The pope and sixteen cardinals were held captive for sixty-one days, while Henry pressed the pope to agree to his solution to the investiture controversy. On 11 April, at Ponte Mammolo on the Anio River, Rainerius was one of the cardinals who were compelled to sign the papal promise to observe the agreement which Henry had drawn up. This was his first known papal subscription.

In attempting to placate Henry, however, Paschal only made matters worse. Though asserting the separation of church and state in the institution to benefices, Paschal granted the emperor a privilegium in the matter of investiture. The Gregorians saw the "Privilegium" as a betrayal of everything they had been doing to free the Church from the State, though numerous others saw it as a betrayal and a fatal weakness in the pope. Pressure from inside the empire and outside mounted on Paschal to summon a council, whose expressed purpose would be to annul the "privilege'. More than one hundred bishops participated in the Lateran council in the following year, on 18—23 March 1112. The "privilege" was soundly condemned. Cardinal Rainerius signed the acts of the council. He also subscribed to a papal document at the Lateran on 11 May 1112.

In 1114, at Tivoli, he subscribed again, and at the Lateran on 17 November and 27 November 1115. On 24 May 1116, he signed a document at the papal residence in Trastevere.

Cardinal Rainerius participated in the election of Cardinal Giovanni Gaetani as Pope Gelasius II on 24 January 1118. The electoral meeting took place at the monastery of the Palladium (Santa Maria in Pallara, near the Arch of Titus and the Arch of Constantine) for reasons of security. Cardinal Theobaldus was one of those present. During the enthronement ceremony, Cencius Frangipani and his supporters broke into the monastery, seized and abused the pope and others, and carried Gelasius off to one of their prisons. He was rescued, but, on the approach of Henry V to Rome, he fled to Gaeta, to Capua, to Pisa, and then to France. Cardinal Rainerius is not mentioned in any of those places; apparently he remained in Rome.

His latest subscription took place on 17 April 1121. His successor, Cardinal Crescentius of Anagni, was promoted to Cardinal-priest by Pope Calixtus II in 1121 or 1122.

== Bibliography ==
- Gregorovius, Ferdinand (1896), History of Rome in the Middle Ages. Volume IV. part 2, second edition (London: George Bell, 1896).
- Hüls, Rudolf (1977). Kardinäle, Klerus und Kirchen Roms: 1049–1130 (in German). Bibliothek des Deutschen Historischen Instituts in Rom. ISBN 978-3-484-80071-7.
- Jaffé, Philippus (1885). Regesta pontificum Romanorum ab condita Ecclesia ad annum post Christum natum MCXCVIII (in Latin). Vol. Tomus primus (second ed.). Leipzig: Veit.
- Klewitz, Hans-Walter (1957). Reformpapsttum und Kardinalkolleg. Die Entstehung des Kardinalkollegiums. Studien über die Wiederherstellung der römischen Kirche in Süditalien durch das Reformpapsttum. Das Ende des Reformpapsttums (in German). Hermann Gentner Verlag, Darmstadt.
- Watterich, J. B. M. (1862). Pontificum Romanorum qui fuerunt inde ab exeunte saeculo IX usque ad finem saeculi XIII vitae: ab aequalibus conscriptae (in Latin). Vol. Tom. II. Leipzig: G. Engelmann.
