= Boso of Sant'Anastasia =

"A Decree of Lord Boso, Cardinal of the Holy Roman Church", in an old Visigothic script, as it appears on the only surviving copy of the acts of the council of Burgos of 1117

Boso (Italian Bosone) was a Roman Catholic cardinal, priest of Sant'Anastasia al Palatino (1116–1122) and bishop of Turin (1122–1126×28). He was a frequent apostolic legate, making four separate trips to Spain in this capacity. In Spain he proclaimed a crusade to re-conquer the Balearics and held several synods to establish the Gregorian reforms. In Turin, he introduced the truce of God to curb private warfare.

== First mission to Spain ==
Boso was probably from the Piedmont region of northern Italy, which was at the time part of the Holy Roman Empire. The Piedmontese church had connections with Spain. In 1112, the abbot of San Michele della Chiusa in Piedmont travelled to Spain to summon its bishops to the council of Benevento being held the following year. He also tried to mediate between the warring married couple, Queen Urraca of Castile–León and King Alfonso of Aragon–Pamplona.

Boso is first recorded as a deacon at the court of Pope Paschal II in Benevento in early January 1113. Of his life before this we know nothing. Later that year, he went to Pisa as the papal legate responsible for overseeing the joint military expedition of the Pisans and the Catalans against the Almoravid-occupied island of Majorca. A first Pisan fleet sailed to Barcelona in 1113, but Boso went with a second fleet, which joined the earlier fleet that had wintered over in the spring of 1114. This was his first legatine visit to Spain. In Catalonia, he held a church council at Girona and proclaimed the crusade indulgence for those who would take part in the Majorcan campaign (June 1114–April 1115). His role in organizing the expedition is recounted in the Liber maiolichinus ("Book of Majorca"), a contemporary Pisan account.

== Return to Italy ==
Boso probably returned to Italy via southern France. He probably convened another church council at the abbey of Saint-Gilles. This council is known only from a letter of Pope Paschal; its acts do not survive. Boso is first recorded as the cardinal-priest of Sant'Anastasia when he attended the non-ecumenical Lateran council of March 1116. The fact that no earlier document refers to him as a cardinal may be no more than an accident of documentary survival, since his legatine work in the preceding three years suggests a very high position in the church.

== Second mission to Spain ==
Boso's second voyage to Spain as legate came in response to the election by the cathedral chapter of Barcelona of an unwilling abbot from Provence (west of Piedmont) to be their bishop. On 23 May 1116, Pope Paschal wrote to Olegarius, the abbot of Saint-Ruf, to inform him he was sending his legate Boso charged with inducing him to accept his election as bishop of Barcelona. According to the Vita sancti Ollegarii ("Life of Saint Olegarius"), a 14th-century biography of Olegarius based on a lost 12th-century work, Paschal sent Boso in response to a delegation sent by some Spanish bishops who wanted the pope to force Olegarius to accept his election and also to give the Spanish church support against the Almoravids.

En route to Saint-Ruf, Boso joined Count Raymond Berengar III of Barcelona at Pisa. The count was then returning from a trip to Rome, where he had received papal protection in exchange for annual payment to the Holy See, also on 23 May. Raymond Berengar and Boso had surely met previously during the Majorcan expedition, since the count of Barcelona was the leader of the Catalans. From Pisa, the cardinal and the count travelled to Saint-Ruf, where Boso persuaded Olegarius to accept his election as bishop, and thence to Maguelonne, where Olegarius was consecrated. Boso and his charge next moved into the north of the Duchy of Aquitaine, where he assisted Bishop Eustorgius of Limoges in consecrating a church near Uzerche. In the undated record of this action, Boso asserts that he was "travelling through [these] Aquitanian parts because of the army gathering over Spain" (causa exercitus congregandi super Hispanias per Aquitaniae partes transiens).

According to the Anonymous of Sahagún, when Boso finally arrived in Spain he made a round of the Kingdom of León, passing through the cities of Burgos, Palencia, León, Santiago de Compostela and Braga, in that order. The anonymous chronicler also claims that a primary purpose of his journey was to mediate between Queen Urraca and King Alfonso, whose rocky marriage had finally been annulled in 1114. After his visit to León, Boso appears to have left Spain briefly. On 4 November 1116, Boso attended the investiture of Arberto II, provost of Oulx, as archpriest of the church of Santa Maria in Susa in the Piedmont. Boso seems to have been responsible for persuading Meinhard, the bishop of Turin, to give Arberto the promotion. The chronology is unclear on the exact order of the consecration of the church at Uzerche, the tour of León and the visit to Oulx. It is possible that Boso did not arrive in Spain until December 1116, making his second and third missions one single trip.

== Third mission to Spain ==
On 18 February 1117, Boso presided over a church council at Burgos, the capital of the Kingdom of Castile. The acts of this council were only discovered in 1906. Archbishop Bernard of Toledo, Bishop Hugh of Porto, Bishop Jerome of Salamanca and Bishop Olegarius attended. Queen Urraca did not, but it was convoked in her name and the name of her son, Alfonso VII, already reigning in Galicia. Only bishops from her realms and from Catalonia attended; no bishops of Aragon or Navarre were present. Archbishop Maurice of Braga did not attend, and Boso pronounced a sentence on him in his absence. The council was primarily concerned with carrying out reforms. Canon XIV prohibited consanguineous marriage, probably at the queen's insistence, in order to further nullify her own marriage to Alfonso of Aragon. It also condemned simony and priestly concubinage. In ecclesiastical matters, the absent archbishop of Braga lost the diocese of Coimbra, which was assigned to the province of Mérida. The boundaries between the diocese of Mérida, Coimbra, Braga and Porto were also clarified in an agreement signed at Burgos on 24 February. It was probably at this time that Boso wrote to Bishop Peter of Palencia to let him know that Count Pedro Ansúrez had donated to Palencia the church of Valladolid and all its possessions.

From Castile, Boso moved into Catalonia, where he held his second council at Girona on 22–23 April 1117. Although the acts of this council do not survive, Boso's letter to Bishop Odo of Urgell announcing the council does. At the council he also passed judgement in a dispute between Olegarius and the abbot of Sant Cugat del Vallès, the record of which also survives. It is probable that it was while he was at this council that Boso signed the acts of the diocesan council of Girona held at Vilabertrán in November 1100. The ex post facto confirmation of local councils by ecclesiastical superiors was a distinctly Catalan tradition.

== Travels in France ==
It is unknown when Boso left Spain, but he was at Orange in December 1118, where Pope Gelasius II was staying, having been exiled from Rome since November. He probably remained with Gelasius until the latter's death at the abbey of Cluny on 29 January 1119. He did not summon the Spanish bishops to the council of Clermont, scheduled for March 1119, which one would have expected from his recent work as legate there. Instead, Cardinal Deusdedit of San Lorenzo in Damaso gave the summons. According to Orderic Vitalis, Boso was present at Cluny for the papal election of 2 February 1119 that chose Calixtus II as Gelasius' successor. (Orderic is not completely reliable, however, since he confuses Boso with the bishop of Porto.)

Boso spent the first year of Calixtus' pontificate traversing France with the papal entourage. On 18 June 1119, he was with Calixtus at the abbey of Saint-Gilles. In July, he attended the council of Toulouse presided over by the pope. On 24 September, Boso and the papal party were at Tours. The pope held another council at Reims in October, whereat, Orderic records, Boso took part in a vigorous debate. Boso was still with Calixtus at Gap on 11 March 1120, but he was sent on his fourth and final mission to Spain shortly thereafter. Bishop Hugh of Porto, who was also at the papal court, accompanied him as far as the Pyrenees. Boso had entered Spain before the year was out.

== Fourth mission to Spain ==
The main source for Boso's final legation in Spain is the Historia compostellana, which even incorporates several pieces of correspondence between Boso and Diego Gelmírez, the archbishop of Santiago de Compostela and hero of the Historia. Boso was accompanied in Spain by Bishop Guy of Lescar, and together they visited the shrine of Saint James, a major pilgrimage site, in Santiago de Compostela. Boso and Guy then went to Ávila, where they attended the consecration of the first bishop of the restored diocese, Sancho (1121). After that, Boso visited the court of Queen Urraca and her son for high-level political discussions—"on the state of the holy church and the Spanish kingdom" (de statu Sanctae Ecclesiae et Hispaniae regni), in the words of the Historia. At court, he announced a council of the Spanish church to be held at Sahagún in August 1121. The Historia also quotes a letter in which Boso informs Diego of an upcoming council being held at Toulouse on the Sexagesima Sunday next (in dominica sexagesimae), but nothing further is known of this council, if it took place at all.

The council of Sahagún ended on 25 August and its acts, drawn up on that date, survive. Mainly they condemn simony and promote clerical celibacy. More dramatically, at Sahagún Boso pronounced an interdict on Spain to take effect from feast of Saint Martin (11 November 1121). Although Boso does not explain himself, recent events in Galicia clearly precipitated his action. Urraca's Galician henchman, Fernando Yáñez, had arrested Diego Gelmírez and, on the queen's orders, several castles belonging to the archdiocese had been seized. Although the incident was quickly patched up and Diego freed, Pope Calixtus was unaware of this when he wrote to Boso on 7 October, urging him to take all measures to procure Diego's release, even up to convoking another council. The pope also expressed the wishes of the entire College of Cardinals that Boso should return to Rome. Indeed, Boso seems to have set out for Italy soon after receiving this letter.

== Bishop of Turin ==
It was probably during his return trip from his last diplomatic mission to Spain that Boso intervened with Bishop Gerald II of Angoulême on behalf of the abbey of La Sauve-Majeure. A later papal confirmation of La Sauve-Majeure's privileges is the only record of Boso's detour north in 1122. There is no record of Boso ever arriving in Rome, nor any later reference to his presence at the papal court. After 1123, the priesthood of Sant'Anastasia belonged to Teobaldo Boccapeccus.

Although this sudden absence was once frequently attributed to his death, in fact Boso had merely resigned his cardinalate, as required by canon law, to assume the office of bishop of Turin. The date of his election as bishop is unknown, but he is first recorded in office on 13 December 1122. The author of the Historia compostellana was apparently aware of Boso's resignation and election, for he records that Diego had a precious cross made specifically as a gift for Boso as bishop of Turin, in gratitude for the work Boso had done on his behalf during the crisis of 1121.

Less is known of Boso's years at Turin than of his legations in Spain, since his episcopate is not covered by any narrative sources. At the castle of Testona on 18 April 1122 or 1123, he made a gift to the abbey of Santa Maria in Pinerolo. He also patronised the abbey of Novalesa in 1122 or 1123, although the only copy of the charter of his gift is mistakenly dated to 1120. In another document dated to 1120 (but, again, pertaining to either 1122 or 1123), Pope Calixtus confirmed a donation made by a certain Countess Adelaide (or Adalasia) to Boso's church. Boso held a local church council to proclaim the truce of God (treuga Dei) throughout the diocese. The "truce" was a prohibition on making war on certain days of the week. Intended to reduce violence, the "truce" movement began in France in the eleventh century and soon spread to the Empire. The act proclaiming the truce was stored in the Biblioteca nazionale di Torino until it was lost in a fire in 1904. An edition published in 1749, which contains no date, is the only surviving reference to Boso's diocesan council.

Boso signed the record of a placitum held by Olrico da Corte, the archbishop of Milan and Boso's ecclesiastical superior, in December 1125. This is the last recorded action of Boso. He died on 30 April, according to the necrology of the church of San Solutore in Turin. The year of death is unknown, but it must have been no later than 1128, when his successor, Arberto, former provost of Oulx, is recorded as bishop. This Arberto, whom Boso had helped as early as 1116, was clearly a protégé of the bishop, for one of Boso's acts as bishop was to confirm the possessions of Arberto's church.
