= Roscemanno =

12th-century Italian cardinal

Roscemanno, O.S.B.Cas. (died in 1128 or later) was a Roman Catholic Cardinal and Deacon of San Giorgio in Velabro.

He was the son of the monk Roscemanno. He himself became a monk at the Benedictine abbey of Montecassino.

Roscemanno was named a cardinal by Pope Paschal II, at the same time as Oderisius II, abbot of Montecassino, probably in 1111 or 1112.

He is not named as one of the cardinals who was taken prisoner, along with Pope Paschal, on 12 February 1111, or made to swear the oath in the name of the pope to accept the agreement with King Henry V. He was one of the cardinals who condemned the "Privilegium" granted by Pope Paschal II to King Henry at the Lateran synod of March 1112.

He participated in the papal election of 24 January 1118.

On 12 April 1118, Roscemann was in Capua with the papal court, and signed a document. In July, the pope and the court returned to Rome, but the pressure of the antipope and the Frangipani compelled them to flee again, on 2 September 1118. The pope and six cardinals, including Rosceman, took ship for Pisa. There is no evidence for any activity of Roscemann at Pisa.

He is said to have participated in the papal election at Cluny on 2 February 1119, according to Petrus Diaconus.

In 1120, during his visit to Benevento, Pope Calixtus II removed Stephanus, the Rector of Benevento, who had succeeded Cardinal Hugo d' Alatri, and replaced him with the Deacon Roscemannus. He served until 1122.

His latest known subscription to a papal document was on 4 September 1128, in Benevento.

== Bibliography ==
- Gregorovius, Ferdinand (1896), History of Rome in the Middle Ages. Volume IV. part 2, second edition (London: George Bell, 1896).
- Hüls, Rudolf (1977). Kardinäle, Klerus und Kirchen Roms: 1049–1130 (in German). Bibliothek des Deutschen Historischen Instituts in Rom. ISBN 978-3-484-80071-7.
- Jaffé, Philippus (1885). Regesta pontificum Romanorum ab condita Ecclesia ad annum post Christum natum MCXCVIII (in Latin). Vol. Tomus primus (second ed.). Leipzig: Veit.
- Klewitz, Hans-Walter (1957). Reformpapsttum und Kardinalkolleg. Die Entstehung des Kardinalkollegiums. Studien über die Wiederherstellung der römischen Kirche in Süditalien durch das Reformpapsttum. Das Ende des Reformpapsttums (in German). Hermann Gentner Verlag, Darmstadt.
- Watterich, J. B. M. (1862). Pontificum Romanorum qui fuerunt inde ab exeunte saeculo IX usque ad finem saeculi XIII vitae: ab aequalibus conscriptae (in Latin). Vol. Tom. II. Leipzig: G. Engelmann.
