= Divizo =

Roman Catholic Cardinal

Divizo was a Roman Catholic Cardinal and Cardinal-priest of the titulus of Santi Silvestro e Martino ai Monti, originally called the titulus Equitii. In 1108, he was papal legate to Germany. He opposed the conciliatory policy of Pope Paschal II to the German King Henry in the Investiture controversy, was imprisoned with the pope and fifteen other cardinals, and forced to sign papal agreements. He then worked against them in the Roman synod of March 1112. After the synod, he was sent to Germany as a legate to Henry V, to work out a compromise. In the winter of 1121 he was promoted Cardinal-bishop of Tusculum (Frascati).

== Cardinal priest of S. Martino ==
Divizo is first recorded in a document of 3 July 1103, in which Pope Paschal II takes the archbishop of Mount Tabor under papal protection, enumerating its possessions. He subscribes himself, "Divizo presbiter cardinalis tit. Equitii".

On 18 February 1107, Cardinal Divizo was one of five cardinals in the papal retinue when it visited the monastery of Bèze, northeast of Dijon, France. On 24 February, the party was in Langres, on 14 July in Le Puy, and later in the month in Valence. On 1 September 1107, the papal party had returned to Italy, and was stopping in Modena, where Cardinal Divizo subscribed a document.

In 1108, Cardinal Divizo was sent as papal legate to Germany. He is recorded as having been at Reichenau, and as having held a council.

In 1111, on 16 February, King Henry V took captive Pope Paschal and sixteen cardinals, including Cardinal Divizo; they were held captive for sixty-one days, while Henry pressed the pope to agree to his solution to the investiture controversy. On 18 April 1111, he was compelled, as a guarantor, to sign the oath demanded of the pope by King Henry.

In negotiating with Henry, Paschal made a major mistake. He continued to assert the separation of church and state in the institution to benefices, but Paschal granted the emperor a privilegium in the matter of investiture. Pressure from inside the empire and outside, led by some of his own cardinals and legates, mounted on Paschal to summon a council, whose expressed purpose would be to annul the "privilege', which was a grave setback for the Gregorian reform movement. Cardinal Divizo was one of more than one hundred prelates who participated in the Lateran council in the following year, on 18—23 March 1112. The "privilege" was soundly condemned, and Divizo subscribed the acts. Archbishop Girard of Angoulême had succeeded in formulating a solution which both the pope and the synod could accept, and therefore, after the conclusion of the synod, the pope sent the archbishop and Cardinal Divizo to the king, in order to negotiate with King Henry over an acceptable solution to the crisis.

In 1112, on 11 May and 19 June, Cardinal Divizo subscribed documents for the pope at the Lateran. He was with the pope at Anagni on 5 November 1114, and on 27 November 1115 and 24 March 1116 at the Lateran, while on 23 November 1116 he was with the pope in Trastevere.

Pope Paschal II died in Rome on 21 January 1118. The meeting to elect his successor was held at the monastery of the Palladium (Santa Maria in Pallara, near the Arch of Titus and the Arch of Constantine) for reasons of security. Cardinal Divizo was one of those present. During the enthronement ceremony, Cencius Frangipani and his supporters broke into the monastery, seized and abused the pope and others, and carried Gelasius off to one of their prisons. He was rescued, but, on the approach of Henry V to Rome, he fled to Gaeta, to Capua, and then to Pisa. Divizo is not mentioned in connection with the consecration of the new pope at Gaeta, or in the flight to Pisa and France. When Pope Gelasius died in France, at the abbey of Cluny, Divizo was not present, nor was he present at the meeting in Rome which received the notification of the election of Pope Calixtus II and issued the Act of Confirmation of the election, but he was one of a group of cardinals who had not been present who immediately wrote to the electors at Cluny, in February 1119, expressing their approval and adherence.

The new pope, Calixtus II (Guy de Bourgogne, Archbishop of Vienne), arrived in Rome on 3 June 1120. Cardinal Divizo subscribed documents for him on 3 January, 7 January, and 14 January 1121 at the Lateran.

== Cardinal bishop of Tusculum ==
On 14 January 1121, Divizo was still Cardinal-priest of San Martino, but by 4 March he had been promoted Cardinal-bishop of Tusculum. He subscribed as Bishop of Tusculum on 17 April. On 15 June, he was at Paliano with Pope Calixtus. In mid-July the papal court embarked on a visit to the south: Aversa, Salerno, Melfi, Tarento, Crotone, and Benevento. On 10 November 1121, Cardinal Divizo was in Tarento, and in January 1122 in Crotone, where Pope Calixtus held a synod. On 22 February 1122, a lawsuit between the Abbess Agnes and the Abbess Bethlehem was heard by Pope Calixtus, who appointed "Dionysius" the Bishop of Tusculum and other cardinals to be judges of the suit.

Cardinal Divizo's latest known subscription to a papal document occurs on 16 May 1122.

== Bibliography ==
- Gregorovius, Ferdinand (1896), History of Rome in the Middle Ages. Volume IV. part 2, second edition (London: George Bell, 1896).
- Hüls, Rudolf (1977). Kardinäle, Klerus und Kirchen Roms: 1049–1130 (in German). Bibliothek des Deutschen Historischen Instituts in Rom. ISBN 978-3-484-80071-7.
- Jaffé, Philippus (1885). Regesta pontificum Romanorum ab condita Ecclesia ad annum post Christum natum MCXCVIII (in Latin). Vol. Tomus primus (second ed.). Leipzig: Veit.
- Klewitz, Hans-Walter (1957). Reformpapsttum und Kardinalkolleg. Die Entstehung des Kardinalkollegiums. Studien über die Wiederherstellung der römischen Kirche in Süditalien durch das Reformpapsttum. Das Ende des Reformpapsttums (in German). Hermann Gentner Verlag, Darmstadt.
- Watterich, J. B. M. (1862). Pontificum Romanorum qui fuerunt inde ab exeunte saeculo IX usque ad finem saeculi XIII vitae: ab aequalibus conscriptae (in Latin). Vol. Tom. II. Leipzig: G. Engelmann.
