= Pandulf of Pisa =

Italian cardinal and biographer

Pandulf of Pisa was a twelfth-century Italian cardinal, and biographer of several contemporary popes. He was a native of Rome. He was a nephew of Cardinal Hugo of Alatri. Under Pope Paschal II, and probably with the patronage of his uncle, Pandulf held the post of ostiarius at the papal court. It is deduced from his detailed description of the election of Pope Gelasius II on 24 January 1118 that he was present. On his coronation day, 10 March 1118, Pope Gelasius II elevated him to the rank of Lector and Exorcist. Pope Calixtus II ordained him a subdeacon.

On 2 September 1118, when Gelasius was about to flee from Rome, thanks to the violence of the Frangipani, he appointed Cardinal Hugo of Alatri to be Rector of Benevento (custodia Beneventanae urbis); his nephew Pandulf accompanied him (nobis Beneventum vergentibus). Gelasius died in exile in France, at the monastery of Cluny, on 29 January 1119. His successor was Archbishop Guy de Bourgogne of Vienne, who took the name Calixtus II. He arrived in Rome on 3 June 1120, and after some time summoned Hugo of Alatri from Benevento. The pope and papal court visited Benevento from 8 August to 29 November, and Cardinal Hugo was among their number.

It is believed that Pandulf took part in the 1124 papal election of 15 or 16 December, based on the richness of detail in his biography of Pope Honorius II.

In the schism after 1130, Pandulf supported Anacletus II against Innocent II. Pope Anacletus named him cardinal-deacon of SS. Cosma e Damiano; he signed bulls of Anacletus on 8 February 1131, 7 December 1134, and 21 March 1137. Pope Anacletus died on 25 January 1138, and therefore subscriptions of his Obedience ceased. The schism itself continued for a few months, under antipope Victor IV, until Innocent II bribed the Pierleonito change Obediences. Bernard of Clairvaux worked for several weeks to persuade Roger of Sicily and the Anacletan cardinals to submit, with eventual success. To induce the Anacletan cardinals, including presumably Pandulf, Innocent II promised that he would not deprive them of their offices or diminish their incomes. Innocent reneged on his promise at the Second Lateran Council in 1139, both depriving and excommunicating them all.

Pandulf was the author of four papal biographies: Paschal II, Gelasius II, Callistus II and Honorius II. Those biographies were incorporated into the compilation called the Liber Pontificalis. Other biographies attributed to him were published in the Rerum Italicarum scriptores by Ludovico Antonio Muratori; some of those attributions have been changed.

According to Ian Stuart Robinson, Pandulf's biography of Gelasius II is inaccurate in electoral details, and had a polemic purpose relating to the schism of 1130. Pandulf is thought to have been a friend of Gelasius.

== Bibliography ==
- Brixius, Johannes M. (1912). Die Mitglieder des Kardinalkollegiums von 1130-1181 (in German), Berlin 1912, p. 48-49 no. 13.
- Liber Pontificalis nella recensione di Pietro Guglielmo OSB e del card. Pandolfo glossato da Pietro Bohier OSB, vescovo di Orvieto. ed. U. Přerovský, Volume I (Roma: Vaticano 1978), pp. 113–129. (in Italian) (in Latin)
- Robinson, I. S. (1990), The Papacy 1073-1198: Continuity and Innovation, Cambridge University Press 1990.
- Zenker, Barbara (1964). Die Mitglieder des Kardinalkollegiums von 1130 bis 1159 (in German). Würzburg.

=== External links ===
- Anzoise, Stefania (2015). "Pandolfo da Alatri." (in Italian) Dizionario Biografico degli Italiani. Volume 80 (2015). [speculative]
