= Vitalis of Albano =

- Cardinal-Bishop of Albano
- Church: Roman Catholic Church
- Appointed: c. 1111
- Term ended: c. 1126
- Predecessor: Richardus
- Successor: Matthew of Albano

Personal details
- Died: 1126 or 1127

Vitalis of Albano (died 1127) was a Cardinal and bishop of Albano.

== Life ==
Vitalis was already cardinal-priest of Santa Balbina at the beginning of 1111.

In February 1111, King Henry V came to Rome to demand his imperial coronation. On 12 February the ceremony took place at St. Peter's Basilica, and during the welcome at the door, Pope Paschal II read out a decree, in which he repudiated lay investiture, and ordered all bishops to surrender their imperial fiefs to the emperor immediately and permanently. The king and the indignant bishops retired to discuss the shocking demand, and, as evening approached, the pope refused the coronation. After Mass, he and the cardinals were taken into custody by Henry's armed troops, and on 16 February, after a battle with the Romans in the Borgo, Henry and his captive prelates departed the city. The pope and sixteen cardinals, including Cardinal Vitalis of S. Balbina, were held captive for sixty-one days, while Henry pressed the pope to agree to his solution to the investiture controversy. On 18 April, at Ponte Mammolo on the Anio River, Vitalis was one of the cardinals who were compelled to sign the papal promise to observe the agreement which Henry had drawn up.

Angry at concessions made to the emperor, several cardinals and bishops prevailed upon Pope Paschal to have a synod to rectify the situation. Vitalis was one of more than one hundred cardinals and bishops who participated in the Lateran council in the following year, on 18–23 March 1112. The "privilege", which granted the emperor the right to invest a newly elected bishop with the ring and the staff of office before he was consecrated by the appropriate church officials, was soundly condemned.

At the Quatuor Temporum of June, September, or December 1116, he was promoted cardinal bishop of the suburbicarian see of Albano. He first subscribes on 21 December 1116.

Pope Paschal II died on 21 January 1118 in the Castel S. Angelo. Because of the danger of factional street fighting, the cardinals took refuge at the Benedictine monastery compound of the Palladium (S. Maria in Pallara) on the Palatine Hill. On 24 January, the cardinals elected Cardinal Giovanni Gaetani, who took the name Gelasius II. Vitalis of Albano was one of his electors. His enthronement was interrupted by the Frangipani faction, who seized the pope and imprisoned him; he was quickly rescued by the Roman people, under the leadership of the Pierleoni faction. On 2 March 1118, as King Henry V entered Rome with his army, demanding his imperial coronation, the papal court fled the city for Gaeta, the pope's home town. Gelasius was consecrated a bishop on 10 March by Cardinals Lambertus of Ostia, Petrus of Porto, and Vitalis of Albano. Vitalis was one of the cardinals who did not follow Pope Gelasius into exile on 2 September, first to Pisa, then to Genoa, and finally to France. Instead, from March until July, he had to contend with the presence of the Emperor Henry V and his antipope Gregory VIII (Maurice Burdinus of Braga) in Rome. When news of the death of Gelasius II at Cluny on 29 January 1119, and the election of Archbishop Guy de Bourgogne of Vienne on 2 February, reached Rome, Vitalis was one of the cardinals at the assembly of cardinals, clergy, and laity that met and confirmed the election of Calixtus II.

Pope Calixtus finally reached Rome on 3 June 1120. Cardinal Bishop Vitalis attended the Roman synod of Pope Calixtus at the Lateran Basilica on 3 January 1121, in which the dissension between Pisa and Genoa over control of the church in Sardinia was debated. He subscribed to papal documents thereafter until 17 April. In mid-July, Calixtus began his tour of southern Italy. He visited the abbey of Montecassino on his way to Benevento, which he reached on 8 August; he then visited Capua, and was back in Rome by mid-December. Vitalis is nowhere mentioned in connection with the trip, nor does he subscribe any of the documents issued during the second half of 1121. He was probably not with the papal court.

On 8 July 1123, Cardinal Vitalis participated in the consecration of a chapel in the church of S. Crisogono in Trastevere.

In 1124, the Cardinal subscribed documents at the Lateran on 1 April and 4 June.

Pope Calixtus II died on 13 December 1124, the feast of S. Lucia. The papal election probably took place on 16 December 1124; the cardinals, probably including Vitalis of Albano, chose Cardinal Teobaldo Boccapecci, Cardinal-priest of S. Anastasia, who chose the name Celestine II. Under threat from the Frangipani faction, Celestine resigned almost immediately on the same day, and Cardinal Lamberto Scannabecchi was uncanonically proclaimed Honorius II.

In 1125, from March to May, Vitalis subscribed documents for Pope Honorius II at the Lateran. He was still subscribing papal documents at the Lateran Palace on 28 March 1126. He died within the next twelve months. His successor was already appointed by 9 March 1127.

== Bibliography ==
- Gregorovius, Ferdinand (1896), History of Rome in the Middle Ages. Volume IV. part 2, second edition (London: George Bell, 1896).
- Hüls, Rudolf (1977). Kardinäle, Klerus und Kirchen Roms: 1049–1130 (in German). Bibliothek des Deutschen Historischen Instituts in Rom. ISBN 978-3-484-80071-7.
- Jaffé, Philippus (1885). S. Loewenfeld (ed.). Regesta pontificum Romanorum ab condita Ecclesia ad annum post Christum natum MCXCVIII (in Latin). Vol. Tomus primus (second ed.). Leipzig: Veit.
- Klewitz, Hans-Walter (1957). Reformpapsttum und Kardinalkolleg. Die Entstehung des Kardinalkollegiums. Studien über die Wiederherstellung der römischen Kirche in Süditalien durch das Reformpapsttum. Das Ende des Reformpapsttums (in German). Hermann Gentner Verlag, Darmstadt.
- Watterich, J. B. M. (1862). Pontificum Romanorum qui fuerunt inde ab exeunte saeculo IX usque ad finem saeculi XIII vitae: ab aequalibus conscriptae (in Latin). Vol. Tom. II. Leipzig: G. Engelmann.
