= John of Crema =

12th-century Italian priest and cardinal

John of Crema (Giovanni da Crema) (died before 27 January 1137) was an Italian papal legate and cardinal. He was a close supporter of Pope Callistus II.

== Cardinal ==
Giovanni, the son of Olricus and Rathildis, was a native of Crema, a town 17 km northeast of Lodi in Lombardy.

Giovanni became Cardinal around 1116.

In 1116, the Emperor Henry V had given the bishopric of Verdun to Archdeacon Henry of Winchester, who had conveyed Mathilda, daughter of the king of England, to Germany, as a reward. Archbishop Bruno of Trier disapproved of such an imperial action, and vacated the appointment; the papal legate, Archbishop Guy of Vienne, also excommunicated the emperor. On the advice of Abbot Laurentius, the emperor sent a delegation to Rome to have the excommunication voided. The embassy was captured in the neighborhood of Milan, and brought to the legate, Cardinal Giovanni of San Crisogono. Bishop-elect Henry was absolved, consecrated, and sent back to Verdun, from which he was excluded by the angry locals.

Cardinal Giovanni participated in the election of Cardinal Giovanni Gaetani as Pope Gelasius II on 24 January 1118. The electoral meeting took place at the monastery of the Palladium (Santa Maria in Pallara, near the Arch of Titus and the Arch of Constantine) for reasons of security. Cardinal Giovanni da Crema was one of those present. During the enthronement ceremony, Cencius Frangipani and his supporters broke into the monastery, seized and abused the pope and others, and carried Gelasius off to one of their prisons. He was rescued, but, on the approach of Henry V to Rome, he fled to Gaeta, to Capua, and then to Pisa. Cardinal Giovanni da Crema followed the pope to exile in Pisa.

He probably crossed to France with the papal court at the end of 1118. He was certainly with the Pope, Cardinal Lamberto of Ostia, Cardinal Boso and Cardinal Corrado at St. Vallier (Sanctus Valerius), where he subscribed a peace agreement between the bishop of Gap and the monks of Cluny. He was at Cluny with Pope Gelasius in January 1119, and, when the pope died on 29 January, Giovanni took part in the election which produced Pope Calixtus II (Guy de Bourgogne) on 2 February 1119. He took part in the Council of Reims in October 1119, where he defended the conduct of Abbot Pons and the monks of Cluny.

The papal court was at Pisa on 14 May 1120, where Cardinal Giovanni subscribed an agreement between the canons of Saint-Martin in Lucca and the canons of S. Frediano in Lucca.

Cardinal Giovanni returned to Rome in June 1120. From September to December 1120, the cardinal was with the papal court during Pope Calixtus' trip to south-central Italy. He was in Benevento in October, and at Capua in early December.

The cardinal rebuilt his titular church of San Crisogono in Rome, beginning around 1120. An oratory at the church was consecrated on 8 July 1123, by the bishops Petrus of Porto, Vitalis of Albano, and Guilgiemo of Praeneste, in the presence of six cardinals and the holder of the title. The completed church was dedicated in 1129.

In April 1121, Cardinal Giovanni da Crema led the advance party to establish the siege of Sutri, where the failed antipope, Gregory VIII (Maurice Burdinus) had his headquarters, and from which he was conducting guerilla warfare on the neighborhood. Pope Calixtus followed along shortly thereafter, and, in an eight-day campaign, Sutri was forced to turn over the antipope and surrender. On 27 April 1121, Pope Calixtus wrote to the bishops of France from Sutri, announcing the capture of Burdinus and the end of the siege.

In January 1122, Pope Calixtus, traveling in the kingdom of Naples, held a synod at Cotrone to settle a boundary dispute between two dioceses. Cardinal Joannes Cremensis was in the papal party and was present at the negotiations.

== Legate ==
Appointed by Callistus II (who died in 1124) and confirmed by his successor Pope Honorius II, Giovanni undertook a significant papal mission to Henry I of England in 1124–5. At this time, England was generally closed to papal diplomats. Of nine legates to England appointed during Henry's reign (1100—1135), Giovanni was the only one to be able to use his authority. On 1 June 1124, the legate was at Rouen, awaiting permission to cross the Channel to England. In a letter of 13 April 1125, Pope Honorius reminded Giovanni that the English should "receive him as though he were the vicar of St. Peter." He was also to undertake a legatine visit to Scotland, and Honorius wrote to King David to that effect.

A modern historian has speculated that this permission was a quid pro quo after Callistus had annulled the marriage to Sibylla of Anjou of William Clito, who was struggling against Henry in Normandy. John, with Peter Pierleone and Gregory of San Angelo, had upheld the annulment. Fulk V of Anjou, Sibylla's father, took this badly, and in late 1124 a stand-off developed. Fulk imprisoned the papal legates and treated them roughly, and was excommunicated. Shortly Fulk submitted, and William Clito's position deteriorated in consequence.

Having reached England, the legate Giovanni headed north, crossed the Tweed, and reached King David of Scotland at Roxburgh. There he carried out the pope's mandate, to settle the disputes between the archbishop of York and the bishops of Scotland over jurisdiction, by holding a council. Nothing, however, was settled.

Giovanni held a legatine council at Westminster Abbey on 9 September 1125. Here he claimed precedence over the archbishop of Canterebury, William of Corbeil, and therefore the council was presided over by Giovanni da Crema, in association with Archbishop William of Canterbury and Archbishop Thurstan of York. Twenty bishops and around forty abbots attended. Seventeen canons were promulgated.

One of John's tasks related to enforcement of the celibacy of the clergy. A contemporary story, a rumour, put about by Henry of Huntingdon, and then mentioned in Roger of Hoveden's compilation, and repeated in David Hume's history, reports that the legate Giovanni had been surprised in bed with a woman, perhaps supplied by the bishop of Durham.

=== Courtier ===
Cardinal Petrus Pisanus reports that Cardinal Giovanni da Crema was suspended from his cardinalatial office by Pope Honorius II, but then restored. Honorius had known Giovanni for many years, had shared Pope Gelasius' exile with him, had participated with him in the papal election of 1119 at Cluny, and had followed the new pope, Calixtus II, with him as a leader of the curia. What was charged against Giovanni da Crema must have been very serious as to cause his suspension.

From March 1126 through May 1128, Giovanni is attested in Rome, at the papal court. In August and September 1128, he was with the pope in a visit to Benevento.

== Legate in Lombardy ==
In 1129, as legates in Lombardy, he and Cardinal Petrus of S. Anastasia presided over synods in Piacenza and in Pavia. In October 1129, he was in Bergamo.

Pope Honorius died around sunset on 13 February 1130. While he was still alive, a group of cardinals met, and decided that the election of his successor would be carried out by a committee of eight cardinals. Giovanni da Crema was not one of them. But that meeting never took place. Instead, a clandestine nighttime meeting, within a few hours of the pope's death, elected Gregory Papareschi of the deaconry of S. Angelo in Pescheria as Pope Innocent II. Eight cardinals participated in the election, including bishops Willelmus Praenestinus and Conradus Sabinensis; Petrus Rufus Sancti-Martini in Montibus, Gregorius Papareschi of S. Angelo in Pescheria, and Haimericus Deacon of S. Mariae Novae. Giovanni of Crema is not mentioned. Ferdinand Gregorovius noted: "The proceeding was entirely contrary to law, and Gregory's action was altogether uncanonical." The name of the cardinal of S. Crisogono does appear, however, in a list of the supporters of Pope Innocent.

In May 1130, unable to withstand the universal rejection of his cause by the clergy, nobility, and citizens of Rome (even the Frangipani had deserted him for Anacletus II), Innocent boarded ship with all the cardinals who still supported him, and sailed for Pisa. He left behind only Cardinal Conrad of Sabina, who was to serve as his vicar in the city of Rome. He did not return to Rome until 30 April 1133, though he was forced to withdraw again by August, this time to Siena and then Pisa.

In 1131, Giovanni da Crema was in Langres, where he arbitrated a dispute between the abbots of Luxeuil and of Bèze. At the end of the same year, he was in Germany as papal legate along with Cardinal Willelmus of Palestrina and Cardinal Guido of the deaconry of S. Maria in Via Lata.

He was back at the papal court, which was staying at the abbey of Cluny, where he subscribed a bull for Pope Innocent on 2 February 1132. On 8 March 1132, Giovanni was one of eight cardinals who subscribed Innocent II's letter, written at Valence, to the abbot of Cluny about his controversy with the abbey of S. Aegidius. There is no further evidence concerning the cardinal; it is not known whether he returned to Rome.

== Bibliography ==
- Freund, Stephan (2001). "Giovanni da Crema." Dizionario Biografico degli Italiani Volume 55 (Treccani: 2001). (in Italian)
- Hicks, Sandy Burton (1976). "The Anglo-Papal Bargain of 1125: The Legatine Mission of John of Crema." Albion: A Quarterly Journal Concerned with British Studies, Vol. 8, No. 4 (Winter, 1976), pp. 301–310.
- Hüls, Rudolf (1977). Kardinal, Klerus und Kirchen Roms: 1049–1130, Tübingen: Max Niemeyer 1977. (in German)
- Jaffé, Philippus (1885). Regesta pontificum Romanorum ab condita Ecclesia ad annum post Christum natum MCXCVIII (in Latin). Vol. Tomus primus (second ed.). Leipzig: Veit.
- Zenker, Barbara (1967). Die Mitglieder des Kardinalkollegiums von 1130 bis 1159. Würzburg: Julius-Maximilians Universität. (in German)
