= Pietro Senex =

Pietro Senex (died 1134) was Cardinal-Bishop of Porto from 1102 until his death. He was born probably in Rome.

== Rector of Benevento ==
He appears for the first time as cardinal in March 1102, when he exercised the legatine duties in Benevento. From 1106 until 1109 he is attested as governor of Benevento. In a document of January 1107, he styles himself Ego Petrus Portuensis episcopus gratia Dei et beati Petri apostoli et eiusdem domini nostri papae cardinalis sanctae Romanae et apostolicae sedis atque Rector Beneventanus.

== Henry V, Paschal II, and the investiture question ==
In February 1111, King Henry V came to Rome to demand his imperial coronation. On 12 February the ceremony took place at St. Peter's Basilica, and during the welcome at the door, the pope read out a decree, in which he repudiated lay investiture, and ordered all bishops to surrender their imperial fiefs to the emperor immediately and permanently. The king and the indignant bishops retired to discuss the shocking demand, and, as evening approached, the pope refused the coronation. After Mass, he and the cardinals were taken into custody by Henry's armed troops, and on 16 February, after a battle with the Romans in the Borgo, Henry and his captive prelates departed the city. The pope and sixteen cardinals, including Bishop Pietro of Porto, were held captive for sixty-one days, while Henry pressed the pope to agree to his solution to the investiture controversy. On 18 April, at Ponte Mammolo on the Anio River, Pietro was one of the cardinals who were compelled to sign the papal promise to observe the agreement which Henry had drawn up.

== Opposition to Paschal II ==
In attempting to placate Henry, however, Paschal only made matters worse. Though asserting the separation of church and state in the institution to benefices, Paschal granted the emperor a privilegium in the matter of investiture. The Gregorians saw the "Privilegium" as a betrayal of everything they had been doing to free the Church from the State, though numerous others saw it as a betrayal and a fatal weakness in the pope. Pressure from inside the empire and outside mounted on Paschal to summon a council, whose expressed purpose would be to annul the "privilege'. The leaders of the movement were the papal legate in Aquitaine, Archbishop Gerard of Angoulême; the bishops Leo of Ostia and Galo of St. Pol-de-Leon; and the cardinals Robert of S. Eusebio and Gregory of SS. XII Apostolorum. Pietro Senex was one of more than one hundred bishops who participated in the Lateran council in the following year, on 18—23 March 1112. The "privilege" was soundly condemned.

Cardinal Pietro was present at the Lateran synod presided over by Pope Paschal II from 6—11 March 1116. The major issue was the disputed election of an archbishop of Milan, between Grosulanus and Jordanes. On the fifth day, Grosulanus emotionally appealed to Cardinal Petrus to support him, but Petrus declined, since he was opposed to him.

At the time of Pope Paschal's death on 21 January 1118, Cardinal Pietro had already been serving as Papal vicar at Rome for a number of years. He participated in the papal election of January 1118, in which Cardinal Giovanni Gaetani was elected pope Gelasius II. Forced to flee Rome because of the violence of the Frangipani and the approach of the army of the Emperor Henry V, Gelasius took refuge in Gaeta, where he was consecrated a bishop and enthroned by three cardinal-bishops, Lamberto of Ostia, Pietro of Porto, and Vitalis of Albano. The papal court returned to Rome early in July, after the withdrawal of Henry V, but factional fighting in Rome forced them to flee again at the end of August. Gelasius left Pietro of Porto behind as his Vicar of the City of Rome.

== Election of 1119 ==
Following the death of Pope Gelasius II at Cluny on 29 January 1119, the ten cardinals who were present, after consultation with other prelates, Roman officials, and other Romans were present, proceeded to an election, with the agreement that the name of the successful candidate would be sent to Rome for confirmation. Archbishop Guy of Vienne was elected on 2 February 1119. Within days, Cardinal Pietro presided over the ratification by the Roman clergy of the election of Pope Calixtus II, which was sent to France in time for him to be enthroned in the cathedral of Vienne on 9 February 1119. Cardinal Pietro sent a second letter to the cardinals in France, approving of their actions.

On 6 July 1121, Pope Calixtus II appointed Bishop Pietro his legate in the Holy Land, to carry the pallium to the newly elected and confirmed Patriarch of Jerusalem, Guarmundus. In July 1121, Cardinal Pietro was in the Veneto, where he handed over to the priest Marco his possessions on the payment of one gold byzant per annum; in a letter of 24 July, Pope Calixtus confirmed the grant and sent a cornerstone for the new church in which a college of Canons Regular was to be established. He was back with the papal court at Catanzaro on 28 December 1121.

On 8 July 1123, Cardinal Pietro presided at the consecration of a chapel in the church of S. Crisogono in Trastevere. He was in Rome in 1124, signing documents for the pope at the Lateran palace on 1 April, 26 May, 1 June, and 4 June.

== Election of 1124 ==
Pope Calixtus died in Rome of a sudden fever on 13 or 14 December 1124. It fell to the six cardinal bishops, according to the constitution In nomine Domini of Nicholas II, to nominate the next pope: Crescentius of Sabina, Petrus of Porto, Lambertus Scannabecchi of Ostia, Guilelmus of Palestrina, Vitalis of Albano, and Gilles (Aegidius) of Tusculum. On 15 or 16 December, the cardinal bishops chose Theobaldus Boccadipecora (Buccapecus), the Cardinal Priest of S. Anastasia, whose election was ratified unanimously by the rest of the cardinals. During the election Roberto Frangipani carried out a coup-d'état, proclaiming Cardinal Lambertus Scannabecchi Pope Honorius II. There was no canonical election. Theobaldus resigned immediately that same day, whether willingly or under duress is uncertain. Seven days later, stricken with guilt and remorse, Lamberto resigned his false papacy, though the cardinals apparently reelected or confirmed his office.

On 9 August 1127, Cardinal Pietro consecrated an altar in the church of S. Crisogono in Trastevere.

== Election of 1130 ==
Honorius II died in Rome in the monastery of S. Gregory on the Clivus Scauri, near the Colosseum, on 13 February 1130, after a protracted illness. Even before the pope was dead, however, a group of cardinals in his entourage formed a plan to get the others to agree to choosing the next pope by a committee. The committee was to consist of two cardinal-bishops, three cardinal priests, and two cardinal-deacons. The committee was weighted in favor of the candidate of the Chancellor Cardinal Aymeric and his Frangipani supporters, Gregorio Papareschi, who was in fact a member of the committee. Cardinal Petrus Pisanus places the blame for the plot squarely on the shoulders of Cardinal Aymeric. The meeting and its subject matter were a violation of church law. This plan would have deprived Petrus Senex of his vote as a cardinal-bishop, and indeed, since he was a supporter of Cardinal Petrus Petri Leonis, Petrus Petri Leonis' name would not have been placed in nomination. Depriving Petrus Senex and three other cardinal-bishops of their right to deliberate and vote was a violation of Nicholas II's constitution In nomine Domini.

When Honorius died, late in the afternoon of 13 February, the cardinals gathered around him did not set their plan into motion. Neither did they inform the cardinals of the Pierleoni faction, including Petrus Senex, that the pope had died. Neither did they inform the magistrates of the city of Rome, who only learned of the fact when they assembled after dawn at the church of S. Marco to pay a collective call on the pope. After nightfall, the body of the dead pope was buried in the cloister of S. Gregorio and S. Andrea, by several laymen, without a funeral service. Cardinal Petrus Senex stated firmly, "No mention can be made about a successor until the pope has been buried." During the night, the cardinals inside the monastery held a meeting at which they elected Cardinal Gregory Papareschi pope. Cardinal Petrus of S. Susanna had a tart rebuke for the cardinals on that matter: "They gathered themselves together at some altar in the darkness, and, wishing to claim the title to an evil deed, they fabricated for themselves the deacon of S. Angelo as an idol in their rash boldness of zeal." Gregorovius states, "The proceeding was entirely contrary to law, and Gregory's action was altogether uncanonical.

At dawn, the body of Honorius was dug up again, and carried along with Papareschi to the Lateran Basilica. They were accompanied by the laymen of the Frangipani faction and the faction's cardinals. The body was buried again, in the Lateran, with a full funeral, and Papareschi was consecrated a bishop and enthroned as Innocent II.

After dawn, the senior-cardinal bishop, Petrus Senex, met with the other cardinals, the important Roman clergy, the magistrates and leading citizens, and the people of Rome, in anticipation of the possible announcement of the death of the pope. They were prepared to give Honorius II a funeral befitting a pope. The meeting took place at the church of S. Marco, at the bottom of the steps to the Capitol, which was also convenient for the Pierleoni, whose houses were nearby. When they heard of the doings at the Lateran, they began their own electoral meeting, in the light of the coup-d-état which was underway. Cardinal Pietro gave his nomination and vote to Cardinal Pietro Pierleoni, who became Pope Anacletus II. Anacletus was acclaimed as pope by the cardinals, clergy, magistrates, nobles, and people of Rome. He was enthroned at S. Peter's Basilica on 15 February, and on 16 February he took possession of the Lateran.

Anacletus created new cardinals on 21 February 1130.

== Schism ==
Petrus Senex subscribed the electoral decree of Anacletus on 14 February 1130.

He consecrated Anacletus a bishop on 23 February 1130.

On Holy Thursday, 27 March, Anacletus and Innocent anathematized each other and their followers. Petrus Senex subscribed the bulls issued by Anacletus II on March 27 and April 24 of the same year.

Possibly he died in 1134, without acknowledging Innocent II. His successor in the Anacletan Obedience, Cardinal Joannes, subscribed on 7 December 1134.

== Bibliography ==
- Andenna, Giancarlo (2015). "Pietro". Dizionario Biografico degli Italiani (in Italian). Vol. 83: Piacentini–Pio V. Rome: Istituto dell'Enciclopedia Italiana. ISBN 978-88-12-00032-6.
- Brixius, Johannes Matthias (1912). Die Mitglieder des Kardinalskollegiums von 1130-1181 (in German). Berlin: R. Trenkel.
- Gregorovius, Ferdinand (1896), History of Rome in the Middle Ages. Volume IV. part 2, second edition (London: George Bell, 1896).
- Hüls, Rudolf (1977). Kardinäle, Klerus und Kirchen Roms: 1049–1130 (in German). Bibliothek des Deutschen Historischen Instituts in Rom. ISBN 978-3-484-80071-7.
- Jaffé, Philipp, Regesta Pontificum Romanorum ab condita ecclesia ad annum p. Chr. n. 1198 (in Latin); 2nd ed. by S. Löwenfeld, F. Kaltenbrunner, P. Ewald Vol 1. Leipzig, 1888.
- Klewitz, Hans-Walter (1957). Reformpapsttum und Kardinalkolleg. Die Entstehung des Kardinalkollegiums. Studien über die Wiederherstellung der römischen Kirche in Süditalien durch das Reformpapsttum. Das Ende des Reformpapsttums (in German). Hermann Gentner Verlag, Darmstadt.
- Robinson, Ian Stuart (1990). The Papacy 1073–1198. Continuity and Innovation. Cambridge Medieval Textbooks. Cambridge University Press. ISBN 0-521-31922-6.
- Zöpffel, Richard (1871). Die Papstwahlen und die mit ihnen im Zusammenhange stehenden Ceremonien von 11.-14. Jahrhunderts. Beilage: Die Doppelwahl des Jahres 1130. (in German) Göttingen: Vandenhoeck & Ruprecht. (pp. 267–395)
