= 1119 papal election =

Election of Catholic Pope Callixtus II

Papal election January–February 1119

Dates and location
- 29 January – 2 February 1119; Cluny Abbey, Cluny, Saône-et-Loire, France

Elected pope
- Guy de Bourgogne; Name taken: Callixtus II
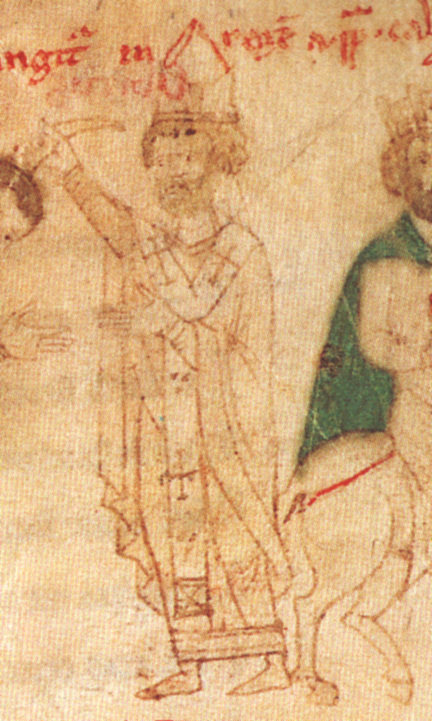

The papal election held from January 29 to February 2 1119 was, of all the elections currently considered legitimate by the Roman Catholic Church, the smallest of the twelfth century.

It is likely that only two cardinal bishops, four cardinal priests and four cardinal deacons participated in the election. The election took place in Cluny Abbey in France, while most of the other cardinals remained in Italy. A non-cardinal Guy of Burgundy, the archbishop of Vienne, was elected Pope Callixtus II. It was agreed by the cardinals at Cluny that they would seek the approval of the cardinals in Rome before they proceeded to enthrone the elected person. The cardinals in Rome granted their consent, and Guy was crowned in Vienne on February 9. Having spent more than a year restoring affairs in France and Germany, he reached Rome on 3 June 1120.

== Death of Pope Gelasius ==
Pope Gelasius II was in exile from Rome, which was in the hands of Emperor Henry V and his antipope Maurice Burdinus, and had fled to France. The struggle with the emperor over the Investiture Controversy was costing him dearly. He held a synod in Vienne in the first half of January 1119, from which he moved to Lyon by January 14. As he was leaving Vienne, Gelasius ordered Archbishop Guy of Vienne to join him in Cluny after he himself had arrived there. The pope then held another synod in Mâcon, where he was stricken by a sudden severe illness, which Pandulfus Pisanus identified as pleurisy. Immediately upon recognising the severity of his condition, he summoned Cardinal Kuno von Urach, the Bishop of Palestrina, and, according to Falco of Benevento, offered him the papacy. Kuno emphatically refused. Instead, Kuno suggested the archbishop of Vienne.

Gelasius was near death when his party reached Cluny, only 24 km (15 mi) from Mâcon, but he was able to have a farewell meeting with the cardinals who had accompanied him, and to receive the sacraments before he died on 29 January 1119.

The "Historia Compostelana" states that, before Pope Gelasius died, the archbishop of Vienne (Guy de Bourgogne) arrived, while the cardinals and the Bishops of Ostia and Porto were discussing possible candidates for the papacy with several Romans. Pope Gelasius (adhuc vivens, still alive) named the archbishop of Vienne and Abbot Pontius of Cluny to the Roman clergy and people as possible successors. The archbishop of Vienne, however, did not arrive at Cluny until 1 February, three days after the pope's death. Moreover, the cardinal bishops present at Cluny were Ostia and Palestrina, not Porto. The "Historia Compostelana" does not appear to be a reliable source.

== Cardinal electors ==
The cardinals who accompanied Gelasius II to Cluny are known from the Liber Pontificalis associated with "Pandulphus" (either Pandulf of Pisa or Pandulf of Lucca), from the charter from Cluny, and from the chronicle of Ordericus Vitalis.

Probably ten cardinals took part in the election.

Elector	Nationality	Cardinalatial order and title	Elevated	Elevator	Other ecclesiastical titles	Notes
Kuno von Urach	Germany	Cardinal-bishop of Palestrina	c. 1107	Paschal II	Papal legate in Germany and France	
Lamberto Scannabecchi, Can.Reg.	Bologna (Fagnano)	Cardinal-bishop of Ostia and Velletri	1105	Paschal II		Future Pope Honorius II (1124–1130)
Giovanni da Crema	Crema	Cardinal-priest of S. Crisogono	1116	Paschal II		Papal legate in Milan (1116)
Guido, O.S.B.	Italy	Cardinal-priest of S. Balbina	1116	Paschal II		
Boso	Italy	Cardinal-priest of S. Anastasia	1113	Paschal II		
Corrado da Suburra	Rome	Cardinal-priest of S. Pudenziana	c. 1111-1114	Paschal II		Future Pope Anastasius IV (1153–1154)
Gregorio Papareschi, Can.Reg.Lat.	Rome	Cardinal-deacon of S. Angelo in Pescheria	1116	Paschal II	Archdeacon of the Holy Roman Church	Future Pope Innocent II (1130–1143)
Pietro Pierleoni	Rome	Cardinal-deacon of Ss. Cosma e Damiano		Paschal II		Future Antipope Anacletus II (1130–1138)
Crisogono	Pisa	Cardinal-deacon of S. Nicola in Carcere	1117	Paschal II	Bibliothecarius of the Holy Roman Church	
Roscemanno, O.S.B.Cas.	Marsica	Cardinal-deacon of S. Giorgio in Velabro	c. 1112 ?	Paschal II		Of the Counts of Marsi

== Proceedings ==
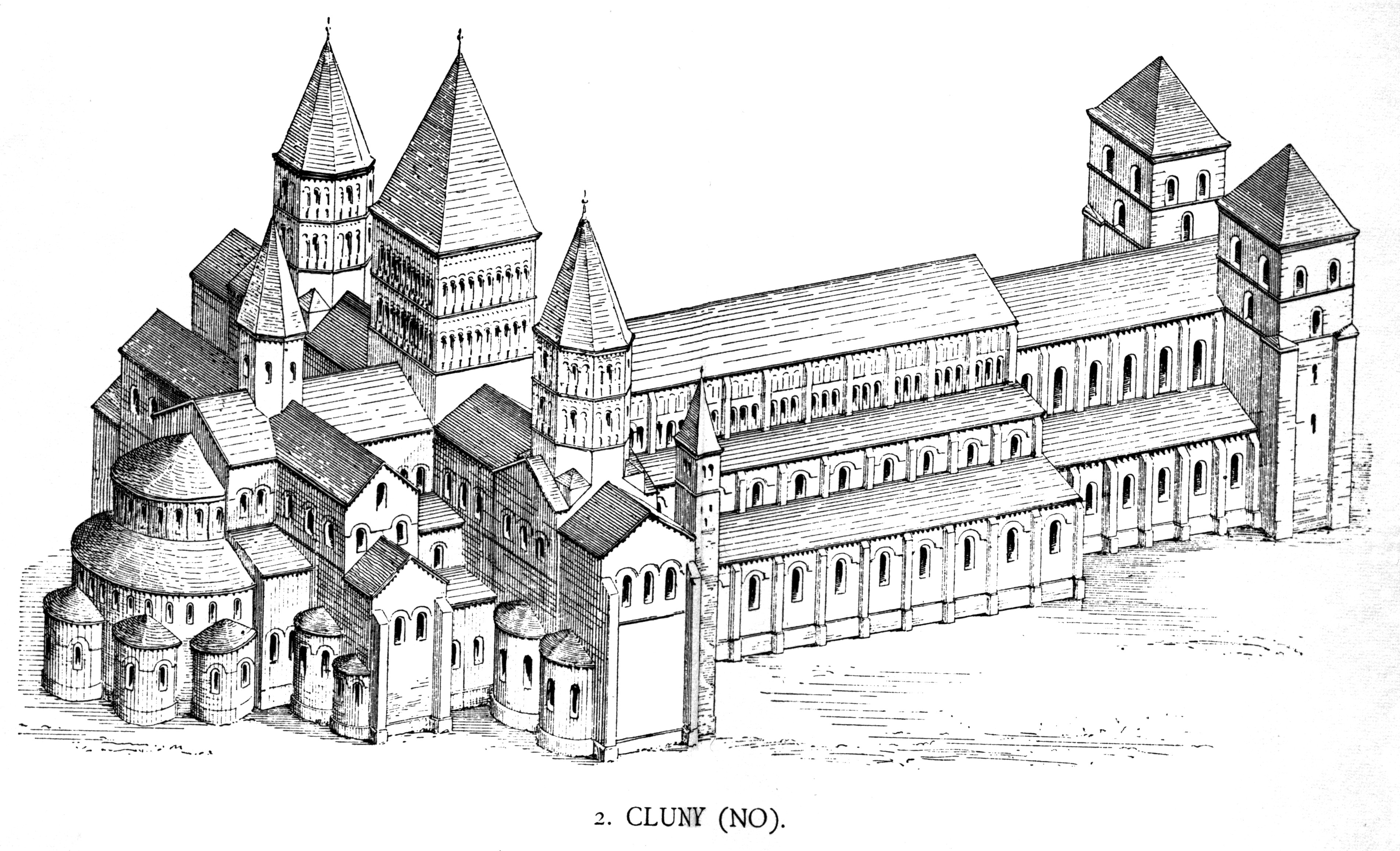
Cluny Abbey, the site of the papal election

The cardinals attending the requiem Mass of Gelasius II in Cluny on 30 January 1119 were divided over whether his successor should be elected on the spot (as was permitted by the papal bull In Nomine Domini of Pope Nicholas II), or whether they should return to Rome and hold the election with the full College of Cardinals. A major consideration was the schism in which the emperor supported his own anti-pope, "Antipope Gregory VIII" (Maurice Burdinus), which could profit from the absence of a legitimate pope. Although the cardinals proceeded with the election immediately, they agreed that they would submit their choice to the entire College thereafter. The election, following canon law, would not have begun until three days after the pope's death, 1 February, and, according to the rules established by Nicholas II, the two cardinal-bishops, Lambertus and Kuno, had the exclusive right of nomination. Archbishop Guy of Vienne arrived at Cluny on that same day, 1 February.

Archbishop Guy was probably the most prominent prelate in Europe. His grandfather had been Duke Richard II of Normandy, making Guy a cousin of King Henry I of England; his brother Renaud had been count of Burgundy, and his sister Sibylla married his successor; his brother Étienne had been Comte de Varsac et de Mâcon; his brother Raymond, Count d' Amous, had married Urraca, the daughter of King Alfonso VI of Castile, making the young Alfonso VII his nephew and ward; a sister was Countess of Savoy and mother of Amadeus III. When Alfonso VI died on 30 June 1109, Guy became tutor (governor) of the under-age Alfonso VII, along with Archbishop Didacus of Compostela and Queen Urraca, and traveled to Burgos to participate of the swearing of fealty to the young monarch.

Although the contemporary accounts diverge on many points, it is clear across them that the two candidates who emerged were Guy and Pontius of Cluny, both named as candidates by the late pontiff. The account of Gaufrid, prior of Vigois, relates that Gelasius II had preferred Pontius and predicted his election; In the view of Mary Stroll, Pontius was a far more conciliatory candidate, likely to negotiate a solution to the Investiture Controversy. Two accounts in particular—those of Bernard of Carrion in the "Historia Compostelana", and Gaufrid of Vigois—detail the election of Guy, emphasizing the importance of his known confrontational stance towards Henry V (having previously excommunicated him) and his powerful family, the Salian dynasty.

== Aftermath ==
According to the Historia Compostelana, immediately following his election as Callixtus II, Guy de Bourgogne was being invested with the papal red mantle, as was the ceremonial custom. His retainers (contribulibus atque militibus suis), when they learned of his election, broke down the doors to the election chamber and rushed in with weapons in their hands; they approached the pope-elect, and violently tore off his mantle, stole, and other papal vestments. They complained that Vienne, Burgundy, and France did not want to lose such a wonderful patron, and demanded that the electors choose someone else. In fact, the violence was a demonstration in favor of Callixtus, but in favor of retaining him as archbishop. No other source, particularly not Pandulphus Pisanus, who was present, notices this incident.

Following his enthronement, the new pope and Archbishop Didacus Gelmirez of Compostela were not friends.

After a year travelling throughout France and holding councils and synods, the pope departed Cluny on 7 January 1120 on his journey to Italy. He reached Pisa on 12 May, and returned to Rome on 3 June. In April 1121, Callixtus II proceeded to Sutri, the location of his opponent, Antipope Gregory VIII, appointed by Henry V. The siege, which was being conducted by Cardinal Giovanni da Crema lasted for an additional eight days, until Gregory VIII was handed over to the pope. Callixtus then imprisoned the former antipope at the monastery of S. Lucia ad Saepta Solis, from which he was moved from monastery to monastery until his death in 1137.

== Sources ==
- Flórez, Enrique (1765). España sagrada. Theatro geográphico-histórico de la Iglesia de España ...: Historia compostelana (in Spanish and Latin). Vol. Tomo XX. Madrid: Real Academia de la Historia.
- Gregorovius, Ferdinand (1896). History of Rome in the Middle Ages. Volume IV. part 2, second edition, revised (London: George Bell, 1896).
- Hüls, Rudolf (1977). Kardinal, Klerus und Kirchen Roms: 1049–1130, Tübingen: Max Niemeyer 1977. (in German)
- Robert, Ulysse (1891). Bullaire du Pape Callixte II: essai de restitution (in French). Vol. Tome I. Paris: Imprimerie nationale.
- Jaffé, Philippus (1885). Regesta pontificum Romanorum ab condita Ecclesia ad annum post Christum natum MCXCVIII (in Latin). Vol. Tomus primus (second ed.). Leipzig: Veit.
- Robert, Ulysse (1891). Histoire du pape Calixte II (in French). Paris: Alphonse Picard.
- Stroll, Mary. 2004. Calixtus II (1119-1124): A Pope Born to Rule. BRILL. ISBN 90-04-13987-7.
- Watterich, J. B. M. (1862). Pontificum Romanorum qui fuerunt inde ab exeunte saeculo IX usque ad finem saeculi XIII vitae: ab aequalibus conscriptae (in Latin). Vol. Tom. II. Leipzig: G. Engelmann.

=== External links ===
- John Paul Adams (2010, revised 2016), "Sede Vacante 1119 (January 29 — February 2, 1119)." Conclave. California State University Northridge. Retrieved: 12 August 2021.
- John Paul Adams, "List of Documents concerning the Papal Election of 1119." Conclave. California State University Northridge. Retrieved: 12 August 2021.
