= Antipope Gregory VIII =

Antipope 1118–1121

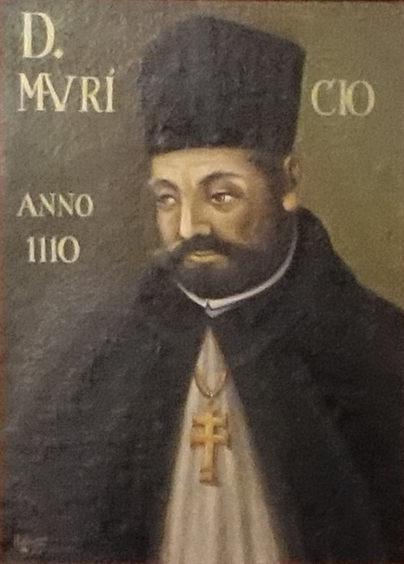
- Bourdin as Archbishop of Braga, Anonymous portrait, c. 16th century, now at the Archbishops Gallery of Braga, Portugal
- Papacy began: 10 March 1118
- Papacy ended: 22 April 1121
- Predecessor: Roman claimant: Gelasius II; Antipapal claimant: Sylvester IV
- Successor: Roman claimant: Calixtus II; Antipapal claimant: Celestine II
- Opposed to: Gelasius II; Calixtus II
- Other post: Archbishop of Braga

Personal details
- Born: Maurice Bourdin Limousin, Occitania, France
- Died: 1137 La Cava, Salerno
- Education: Cluny

Gregory VIII (died 1137), born Mauritius Burdinus (Maurice Bourdin), was antipope from 10 March 1118 until 22 April 1121. Educated at Cluny, he was made Bishop of Coimbra by 1099. Maurice was a main figure in the reorganization of the Portuguese church under Henry, Count of Portugal. He became involved in a dispute with the papal legate of Castile and later suspended. Maurice regained papal favor and was assigned to an embassy to Emperor Henry V. He joined the Henry and crowned him Emperor 25 March 1117, and was subsequently excommunicated by Pope Paschal II.

Following the death of Paschal and the election of Gelasius II, Maurice was elected by the imperial party as Pope and took the name Gregory VIII. His papacy was supported by Emperor Henry and the Frangipani family. After Gelasius II died, Callixtus II was elected and proceeded to march to Rome. Gregory, losing support due to the Pierloni family, fled to Sutri. After a short siege in 1121, he was captured and taken to Callixtus. He was imprisoned in La Cava, Salerno, and died after August 1137.

== Biography ==
Maurice was born in the Limousin, France. He was educated at Cluny, at Limoges, and in Castile, where he was an archdeacon at Toledo, and later named Bishop of Coimbra in 1099. After a four-year pilgrimage to the Holy Land, he was made Archbishop of Braga in 1109. There he was one of the principal agents of Henry, Count of Portugal, in his reorganization of the Portuguese church.

Portugal was then a fief of León, and the ambitious Count Henry pursued a vigorous program of ecclesiastical and political autonomy. By 1114, Maurice had become embroiled in a dispute with the Spanish primate and papal legate in Castile, Bernard of Toledo, to the extent that he was called to Rome and suspended by Pope Paschal II (1099–1118). (Note: It was alleged by cardinal Cesare Baronius that Maurice attempted to bribe Paschal but the bribe was refused. Etienne Baluze disputes the allegation.) Nevertheless, he found favor at the papal court, and in 1116, when Emperor Henry V (1105–1125) invaded Italy during the ongoing confrontations over the Emperor's rights of investiture of clerics, Paschal sent Maurice with some cardinals on an embassy to the emperor, while the Pope and the Curia fled south to Benevento. Maurice openly espoused the cause of Henry, and defected to the Emperor's side. Henry went to Rome, and on Easter Sunday, 25 March 1117 was crowned Holy Roman Emperor by Maurice. Paschal deposed and excommunicated Henry and Maurice.

Paschal died on 24 January 1118 and was succeeded by Pope Gelasius II (1118–19). Henry marched to Rome but Gelasius fled to Gaeta.

== Papacy ==
On 8 March 1118 Maurice was proclaimed Pope, by the imperial party among the cardinals, taking the name Gregory VIII. He was later excommunicated by Gelasius along with Henry on 7 April 1118. On 2 June 1118, Gregory crowned Henry, again, during the Whitsunstide festival. After Pentecost, Henry marched back to Germany, while Gregory was left in Rome supported by the Frangipani family.

Following the death of Gelasius, Calixtus II was elected as Pope in 1119. By March 1120 Callixtus's papal entourage had entered Italy, heading for Rome. Facing rising opposition led by the Pierloni family, Gregory fled to Sutri before 3 June 1120. In April 1121, he was besieged and captured by a Norman army led by Cardinal John of Crema, who handed him over to Callixtus. Gregory was taken to Rome and imprisoned in the Septizonium. After having been moved in confinement from monastery to monastery, he finally died at La Cava, Salerno, some time after August 1137.

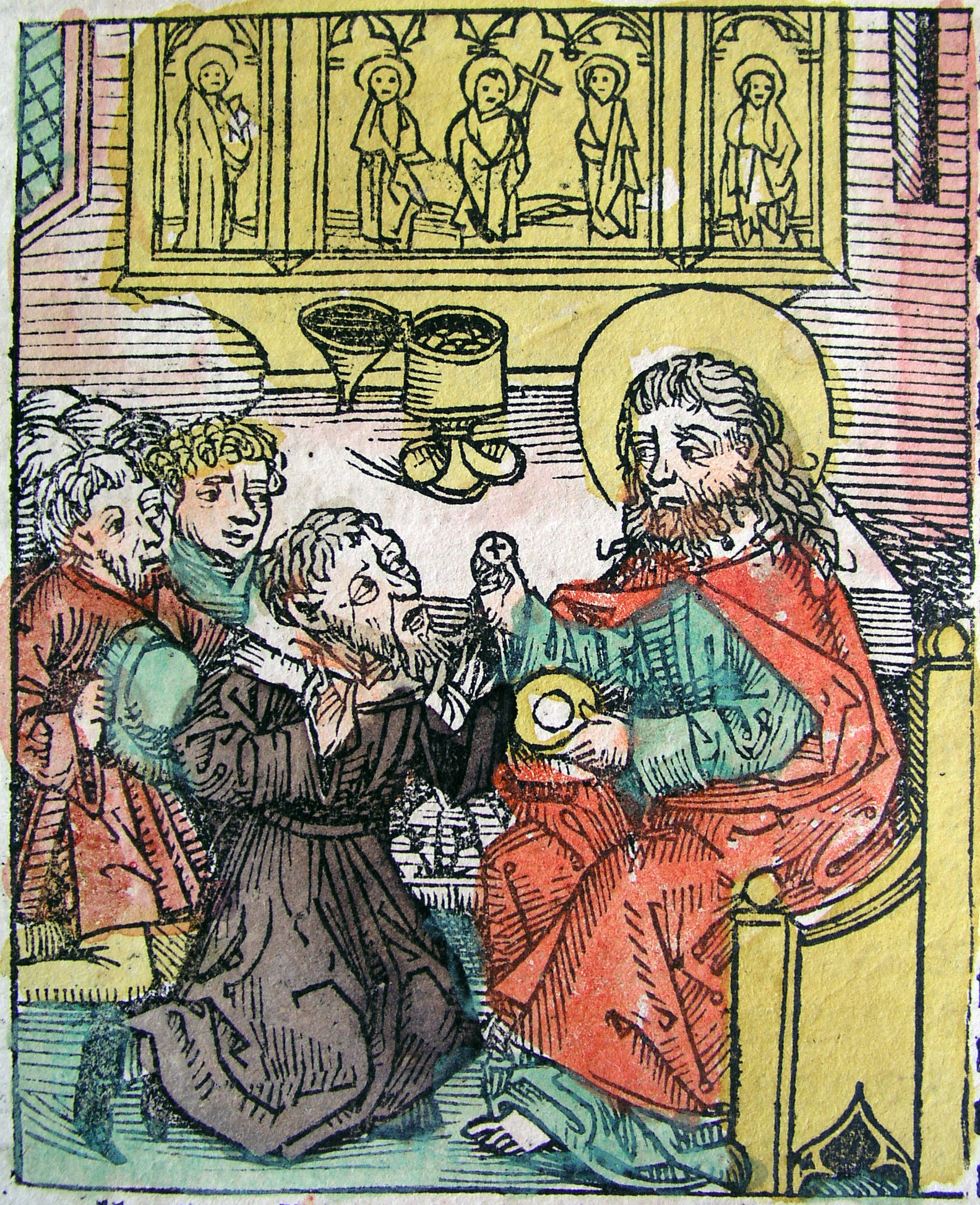
Gregory VIII surrenders to Calixtus II. Illustration from the Nuremberg Chronicle (1493)

== Cardinals ==
No information has been found about the cardinals created by Gregory VIII, but it is known that in March 1118 three cardinals created by Antipope Clement III (1080/84-1100) joined his obedience and formed his own Sacred College:

- Romanus — cardinal-priest of S. Marco and provost of the titular church of S. Marcello
- Cinthius — cardinal-priest of S. Crisogono
- Teuzo — cardinal-priest, former legate of Clement III in Hungary

== Sources ==
- Bishko, Charles Julian (1984). Spanish and Portuguese Monastic History, 600-1300. Variorum Reprints. ISBN 9780860781363.
- Klewitz, H. W. (1957). Reformpapsttum und Kardinalkolleg (in German). Wissenschaftliche Buchgesellschaft.
- Pham, John-Peter (2004). Heirs of the Fisherman: Behind the Scenes of Papal Death and Succession. Oxford University Press. ISBN 9780195346350.
- Stroll, Mary (2004). Calixtus II, 1119-1124: A Pope Born to Rule. Brill. ISBN 9789004139879.
- Schwaiger, George (2002). "Gregory VIII". In O'Malley, John W.; Levillain, Philippe (eds.). The Papacy: An Encyclopedia. Vol. 2. Routledge. pp. 651–652. ISBN 0-415-92229-1.
- Veneziani, Enrico (2025). "The Strange Case of Deusdedit and Pandulf: Two Accounts of Honorius II's election". In Heath, Christopher; Houghton, Robert (eds.). Conflict and Violence in Medieval Italy 568-1154. Routledge. pp. 299–324. ISBN 9781040796276.
- Witcombe, Teresa (2025). On the Edges of Christendom: Maurice of Burgos and the Church and Culture of Medieval Castile. Liverpool University Press. ISBN 9781836249498.
