= 1124 papal election =

Election of Catholic Pope Honorius II

Papal election 1124

Dates and location
- 16–21 December 1124; Monastery of St Pancratius, Lateran Basilica, Rome

Elected pope
- Lamberto Scannabecchi; Name taken: Honorius II

A papal election was held from 16 to 21 December 1124, after the death of Pope Callixtus II on 13 December 1124. The election was characterised by a power struggle between Italian cardinals supported by the Pierleoni family and northern cardinals supported by the Frangipani family. On 16 December the cardinals elected Theobaldo Boccapecci, the cardinal-priest of Sant'Anastasia. He chose the name Celestine II. Before his consecration, however, an armed party of the Frangipani attacked and wounded the newly elected pope. In the following confusion, Lamberto Scannabecchi (Bishop of Ostia and the Frangipanis candidate) was proclaimed pope under the name Honorius II. After several days of factional fighting Celestine was abandoned by his supporters. However, Honorius would not accept the throne in this manner and resigned as well. He was immediately re-elected and consecrated on 21 December 1124.

== Background ==
Pressures building within the Curia, together with ongoing conflicts among the Roman nobility, would erupt after the death of Pope Callixtus II in 1124. The pontificates of Urban II and Paschal II had seen an expansion in the College of Cardinals of Italian clerics that strengthened the local Roman influence. These cardinals were reluctant to meet with the group of cardinals recently promoted by Callixtus II, who were mainly French or Burgundian. As far as the older cardinals were concerned, these newer cardinals were dangerous innovators, and they were determined to resist their increasing influence. The northern cardinals, led by Cardinal Aymeric de Bourgogne (the Papal Chancellor), were equally determined to ensure that the elected pope would be one of their candidates. Both groups looked towards the great Roman families for support.

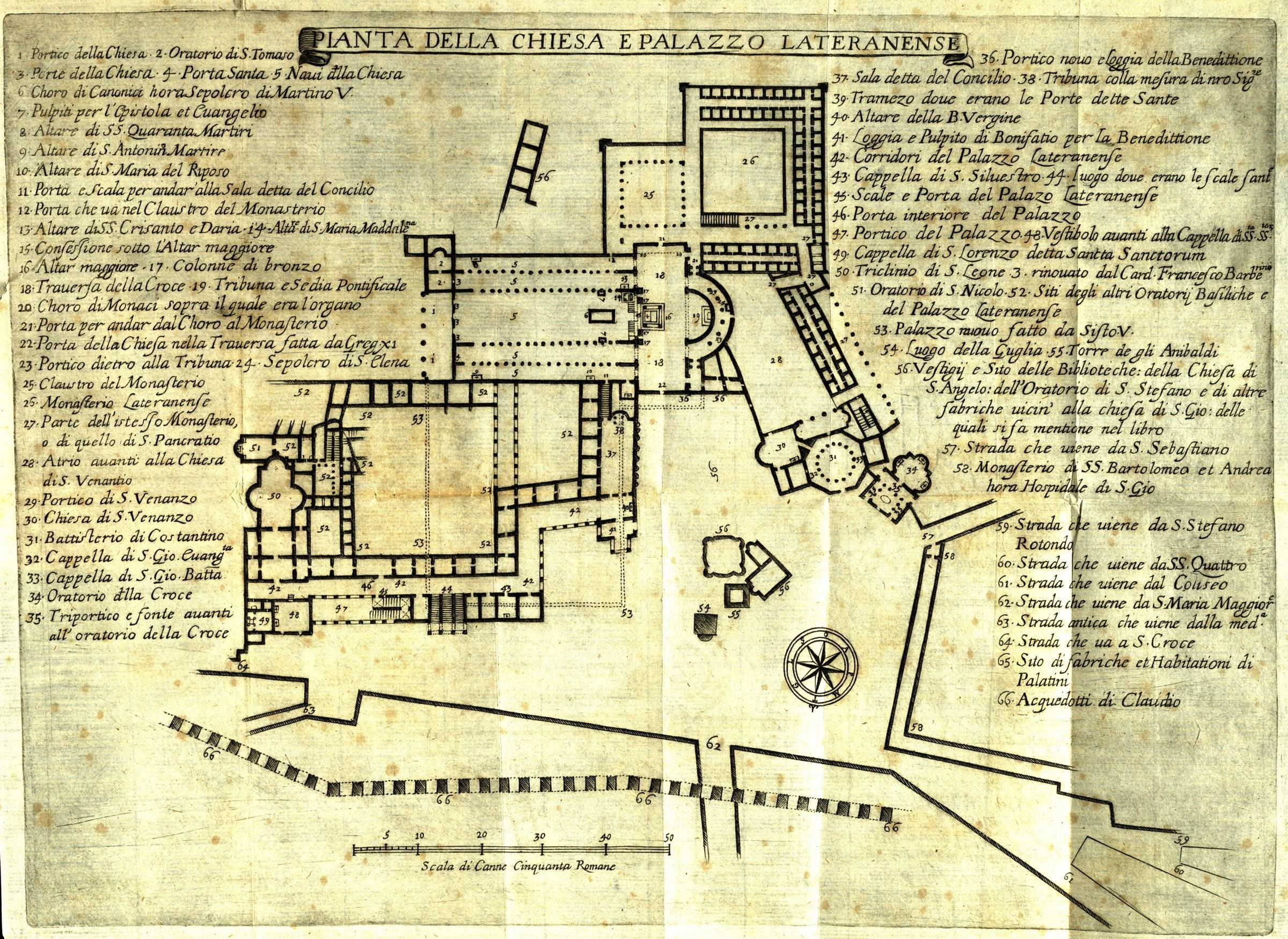
Plan of the medieval Lateran Basilica, with the Monastery of Saint Pancratius at upper right (south).

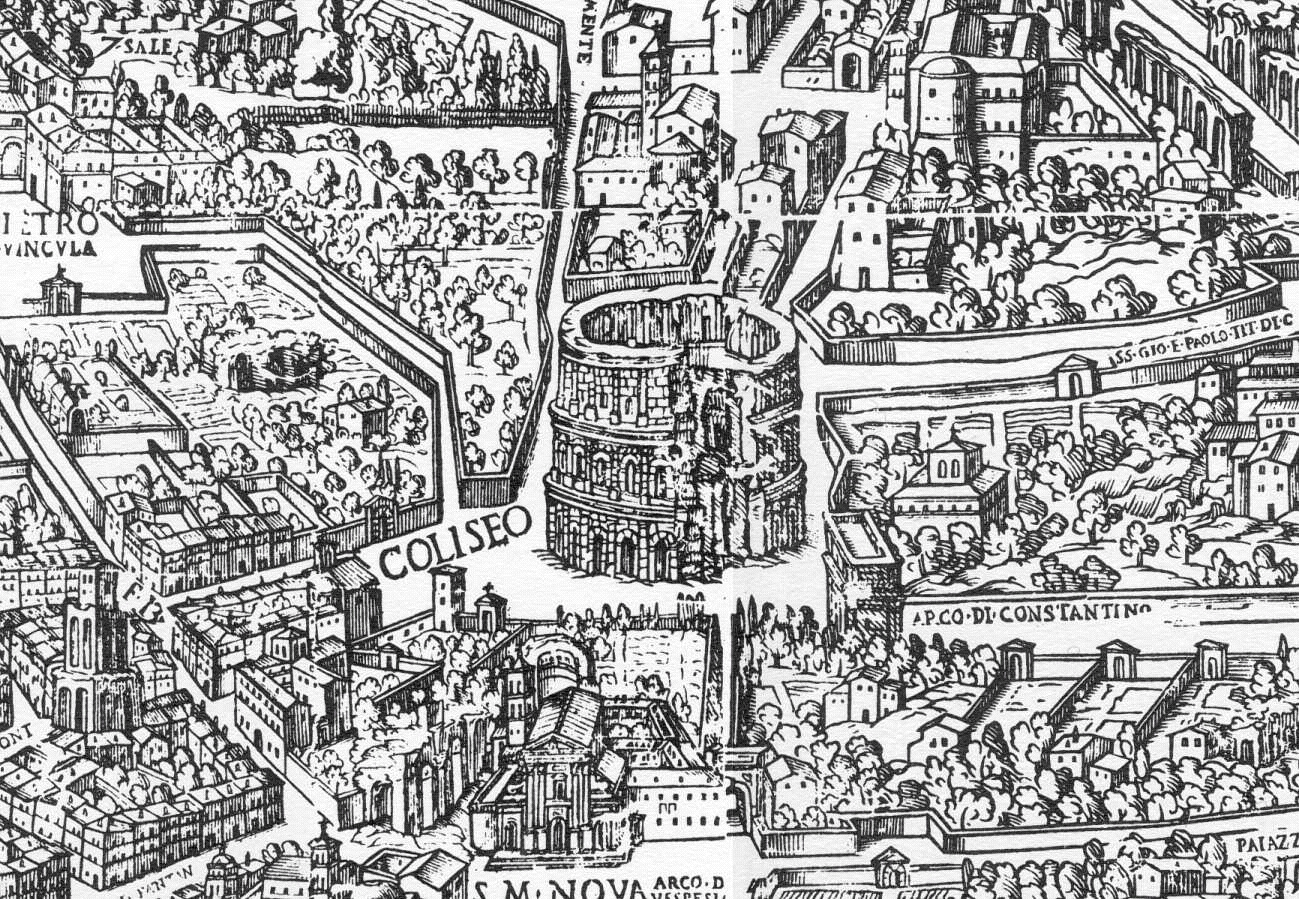
The area of medieval Rome controlled by the Frangipani family

By 1124, there were two great factions dominating local politics in Rome: the Frangipani family, which controlled the region around the fortified Colosseum and supported the northern cardinals, and the Pierleoni family, which controlled the Tiber Island and the fortress of the Theatre of Marcellus and supported the Italian cardinals. With Callixtus II's death on 13 December 1124, both families agreed that the election of the next pope should be in three days time, in accordance with the church canons. The Frangipani, led by Leo Frangipani, pushed for a delay in order that they could promote their preferred candidate, Lamberto, but the people were eager to see Saxo de Anagni, the Cardinal-Priest of San Stefano in Celiomonte elected as the next pope. Leo, eager to ensure a valid election, approached key members of every Cardinal's entourage, promising each one that he would support their master when the voting for the election was underway.

== Election ==
On 16 December, the Cardinals, including Lamberto, assembled in the chapel of the monastery of St. Pancratius attached to the south of the Lateran basilica. There, at the suggestion of Jonathas, the cardinal-deacon of Santi Cosma e Damiano, who was a partisan of the Pierleoni family, the Cardinals unanimously elected as Pope the cardinal-priest of Sant' Anastasia, Theobaldo Boccapecci, who took the name Celestine II. He had only just put on the red mantle and the Te Deum was being sung when an armed party led by Roberto Frangipani (in a move pre-arranged with Cardinal Aymeric) burst in, attacked the newly enthroned Celestine, who was wounded, and acclaimed Lamberto as Pope. Since Celestine had not been formally consecrated pope, the wounded candidate declared himself willing to resign, but the Pierleoni family and their supporters refused to accept Lamberto, who in the confusion had been proclaimed Pope under the name Honorius II. Historians call the election "a travesty of canonical procedure".

Rome descended into factional infighting, while Cardinal Aymeric and Leo Frangipani attempted to win over the resistance of Urban, the City Prefect, and the Pierleoni family with bribes and extravagant promises. Eventually, Celestine's supporters abandoned him, leaving Honorius the only contender for the papal throne. Honorius, unwilling to accept the throne in such a manner, resigned his position before the assembled Cardinals, but was immediately and unanimously re-elected and consecrated on 21 December 1124.

=== Cardinals ===
The College of Cardinals probably had between 47 and 53 members. (Note: Miranda lists 47 members; Adams lists 49, but mentions Panvinio who states there were 53 Cardinals taking part in the election.) Little information is available on which Cardinals were actually present in Rome during the election(s).

The following table lists the Cardinals who were alive at the time of the election (Note: Based on Adams and Miranda, who in turn cite other sources including Brixius, Jaffé, Hüls, Klewitz, Stroll, Pandulf of Pisa and the Annuaire Pontifical Catholique 1928).

Elector	Title (Note: The table does not list the following titles, for which there appears to be a lot of uncertainty: S. Balbina , (Note: The title of S. Balbina may have been occupied by Cardinal Gregorio, but the time of his creation is uncertain. Adams notes that, according to Pandulphus of Pisa, he was made a Cardinal by Callixtus II. Adams also notes that, according to Hüls, Gregorio was created by Honorius II in 1125. Miranda joins the latter opinion and considers the title to be vacant at the time of the election.) S. Eusebio , (Note: Miranda mentions Giovanni O.S.B. Cas. at S. Eusebio. Adams notes that Cardinal Robertus (who was in schism since 1116) was restored to the title by the end of 1121. Even then, it remains unsure whether Cardinal Robertus was still alive for the election in 1124.) S. Lucia in Selci , (Note: Both Adams and Miranda consider that there may have been a Cardinal Stefano at S. Lucia in Selci at the time of the election. The most likely candidate, Stefano Stornato, was probably created Cardinal only in 1125 by Honorius II, making the status of the title during the election quite unsure.) Ss. Quattro Coronati (Note: Miranda mentions Cardinal Bosone at Ss. Quattro Coronati, Adams considers the title to be vacant. Miranda's Bosone appears to be another Cardinal than Boso of S. Anastasia who resigned his title to become bishop of Turin in 1122.) and S. Sabina (Note: It is unclear whether Cardinals Comes of S. Maria in Aquiro and Comes of S. Sabina are the same person or not.))	Elevated	Elevator	Notes
Crescenzio	Cardinal-Bishop of Sabina	1102	Paschal II	
Pietro Senex	Cardinal-Bishop of Porto	c. 1106	Paschal II	
Lamberto Scannabecchi	Cardinal-Bishop of Ostia	1116	Paschal II	Elected pope Honorius II
Vitalis	Cardinal-Bishop of Albano	1116	Paschal II	
Guillaume	Cardinal-Bishop of Palestrina	c. 1122	Callixtus II	
Gilles de Paris	Cardinal-Bishop of Tusculum	c. 1122	Callixtus II	
Bonifacio	Cardinal-Priest of S. Marco	c. 1100	Paschal II	prior cardinalium (by 1127)
Gregorio de Ceccano	Cardinal-Priest of Ss. XII Apostoli	c. 1102	Paschal II	Future antipope Victor IV
Benedict	Cardinal-Priest of S. Pietro in Vincoli	c. 1102	Paschal II	
Anastasius	Cardinal-Priest of S. Clemente	c. 1102	Paschal II	
Teobaldo Boccapecci	Cardinal-Priest of S. Anastasia	c. 1103 or 1112	Paschal II	Elected pope Celestine II on 16 December, and resigned
Ioannes (Note: Miranda places Gianroberto Capizucchi at S. Cecilia. However, this "Cardinal Capizucchi" might be a fake.)	Cardinal-Priest of S. Cecilia	c. 1106	Paschal II	
Corrado della Suburra	Cardinal-Priest of S. Pudenziana	c. 1113	Paschal II	Future pope Anastasius IV
Teobaldo	Cardinal-Priest of Ss. Giovanni e Paolo	c. 1117	Paschal II	
Deusdedit	Cardinal-Priest of S. Lorenzo in Damaso	c. 1116	Paschal II	
Gregorio Albergati	Cardinal-Priest of S. Lorenzo in Lucina	c. 1116	Paschal II	
Petrus Pisanus	Cardinal-Priest of S. Susanna	c. 1116/1117	Paschal II	
Amico, O.S.B.	Cardinal-Priest of Ss. Nereo ed Achilleo	1117	Paschal II	
Desiderius	Cardinal-Priest of S. Prassede	c. 1115	Paschal II	
Gerardo / Gregorio (Note: Miranda notes that Cardinal Gerardo died around 1120 and does not mention the title for the 1124 election; Miranda follows the Liber Pontificalis (Petrus Pisanus), and confuses the evidence. Adams records only Gerardus, and states, on the authority of Hüls, p. 199, that his latest surviving subscription stems from 1129.)	Cardinal-Priest of Ss. Prisca ed Aquila	c. 1115	Paschal II	
Sigizo	Cardinal-Priest of S. Sisto	c. 1117	Paschal II	
Saxo de Anagnia	Cardinal-Priest of S. Stefano al Monte Celio	c. 1117	Paschal II	
Petrus Rufus (Pietro Ruffino Cariaceno) (Note: Miranda lists a Cardinal Domnizzone at Ss. Silvestro e Martino for the election of 1124. He contradicts himself, however, by accepting that Pietro Cariaceno occupied that title since December 1122. Adams notes that Divizo (Domnizzone) was promoted to Cardinal-bishop of Tusculum, and was succeeded at Tusculum by Gilles de Paris (Aegidius) by the end of 1121. Divizo was succeeded at Ss. Silvestro e Martino by Petrus Rufus.)	Cardinal-Priest of Ss. Silvestro e Martino	1118 or 1122 (Note: According to Adams, following Hüls, p. 220, he was previously Cardinal-deacon of S. Adriano (it is unclear whether it is the same "Petrus Rufus" created by Gelasius II, or another Petrus created by Paschal II). Miranda makes a distinction between Pietro "il Diacono" of S. Adriano and Pietro Cariaceno of Ss. Silvestro e Martino. Adams indicates, however, that the former could not have been Cardinal of S. Adriano at the time.)	Gelasius II	
Crescenzio di Anagni	Cardinal-Priest of Ss. Marcellino e Pietro	c. 1121/1122 ?	Calixtus II	
Petrus (Pierre de Fontaines) (Note: Zenker, p. 102, says that he was a Burgundian.)	Cardinal-Priest of S. Marcello	c. 1120	Callixtus II	
Gerardo Caccianemici	Cardinal-Priest of S. Croce in Gerusalemme	c. 1122	Callixtus II	Future pope Lucius II
Ugo Lectifredo (Note: According to Miranda, Cardinal Lectifredo was created in a consistory celebrated in 1123. Adams notes that Lectifredo first subscribes in 1128 and considers the title of S. Vitale to be vacant for the election of 1124.)	Cardinal-Priest of S. Vitale	1123	Callixtus II	
Roscemanno	Cardinal-Deacon of S. Giorgio in Velabro	c. 1112	Paschal II	
Gregorio of Gaeta	Cardinal-Deacon of S. Lucia in Septisolio	c. 1112	Paschal II	
Gregorio Papareschi	Cardinal-Deacon of S. Angelo in Pescheria	c. 1088?/1116	Paschal II	Future pope Innocent II
Gregorio	Cardinal-Deacon of S. Eustachio	c. 1099 ?	Paschal II	
Comes / Cosma	Cardinal-Deacon of S. Maria in Aquiro (Note: Adams lists him as Cardinal-Priest of S. Sabina, based on a subscription on April 15, 1123. This may be an error, since he states elsewhere that he was promoted only in 1126 by Honorius II.)	c. 1116 (Note: Miranda states that he was created in 1088 (hence by Urban II). Adams considers this unlikely since he only begins to subscribe in 1116.)	Paschal II	
Enrico (Note: He was Dean of Mazara in Sicily. Mazara is not his name, but his ecclesiastical position. Hüls, p. 242.)	Cardinal-Deacon of S. Teodoro	c. 1117	Paschal II	
Angelo	Cardinal-Deacon of S. Maria in Domnica	c. 1122	Callixtus II	
Romano	Cardinal-Deacon of S. Maria in Portico	c. 1119 (Note: According to Miranda he was made a Cardinal in 1099 by Paschal II. Adams considers him a creation of Gelasius II.)	Callixtus II	
Étienne de Bar	Cardinal-Deacon of S. Maria in Cosmedin	c. 1120	Callixtus II	
Ionathas (Gionata)	Cardinal-Deacon of Ss. Cosma e Damiano	c. 1120	Callixtus II	
Giovanni Dauferio	Cardinal-Deacon of S. Nicola in Carcere	c. 1122	Callixtus II	
Gregorio Tarquini	Cardinal-Deacon of Ss. Sergio e Bacco	c. 1122	Callixtus II	
Uberto Lanfranchi (Note: According to Miranda, Uberto Lanfranchi was only created Cardinal at S. Clemente in 1125. He places a Cardinal Romualdo Guarna at S. Maria in Via Lata at the time of the election. Romualdo did, however, become Archbishop of Salerno in 1121, resigning his title of Cardinal. Miranda doesn't seem to differentiate between Romuald I and Romuald Guarna (II).)	Cardinal-Deacon of S. Maria in Via Lata	c. 1123	Callixtus II	
Gregorio	Cardinal-Deacon of Ss. Vito e Modesto	c. 1122	Callixtus II	
Matteo	Cardinal-Deacon of S. Adriano	c. 1122	Callixtus II	
Aymeric de la Châtre	Cardinal-Deacon of S. Maria Nuova	1122 or 1123	Callixtus II	Chancellor

==== Absentee Cardinals ====
Elector	Title	Elevated	Elevator	Notes
Giovanni da Crema	Cardinal-Priest of S. Crisogono	c. 1117	Paschal II	Papal legate in Scotland or England at the time of the election (Note: Adams states that he was given the mission by Pope Callixtus II. On 1 June 1124, the legate was in Rouen. On 29 March 1125, he celebrated Easter at Canterbury: Hüls, p. 176, n. 38. Pope Honorius II wrote a letter to him on 13 April 1125, authorizing him to carry on the legantine task given him by Pope Calixtus (Jaffe-Lowenfeld, Regesta pontificum Romanorum I (Leipzig 1885), #7203). He was still in England, and present at the Council of London on 9 September 1125. According to Miranda he was present for the election and only left for England in 1125.)
Pietro Pierleoni	Cardinal-Priest of S. Maria in Trastevere	c. 1106	Paschal II	Papal legate in France at the time of the election. Future antipope Anacletus II
Oderisio di Sangro (Note: Cardinal Oderisio did not participate in the election according to Petrus Diaconus, cited by Adams. According to Miranda, he did participate.)	Cardinal-Priest of S. Ciriaco in Thermis (Note: Cardinal Oderisio was promoted from S. Agata to S. Ciriaco in Thermis in 1122, according to Miranda. Adams is less sure of this and states that the date of the promotion is not recorded.)	c. 1112	Paschal II	Abbot of Montecassino
