= Cardinals created by Honorius II =

Catholic appointments from 1124 to 1129

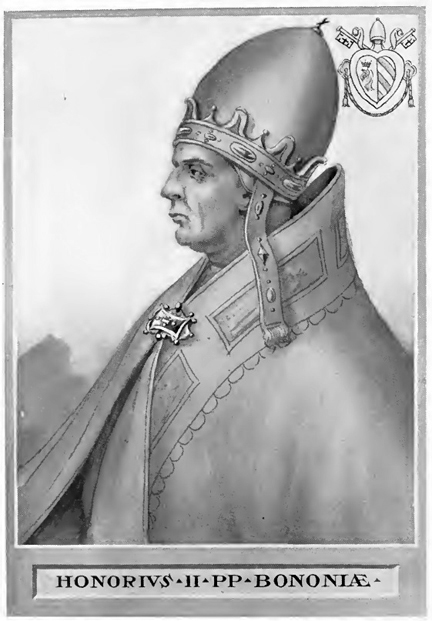
Pope Honorius II.

Pope Honorius II (r. 1124–1130) created 27 cardinals in six consistories held throughout his pontificate. This included his successors Anastasius IV and Celestine II both in 1127.

== 1124 ==
- Guido

== 1125 ==
- Gregorio
- Uberto Ratta
- Alberico Tomacelli
- Rodolfo degli Armanni della Staffa
- Stefano
- Ugo Geremei
- Cosma
- Pietro dei Garsendi

== 1126 ==
- Mathieu O.S.B. Clun.
- Giovanni O.S.B. Clun.
- Sigizzo Bianchelli iuniore
- Gregorio
- Matteo
- Anselmo Can. Reg.
- Pierre
- Gian Roberto Capizucchi

== 1127 ==
- Bennone de' Cocliti
- Guido di Castello
- Pierre

== 1128 ==
- Joselmo
- Rustico
- Rustico de' Rustici

== 1129 ==
- Errico
- Gerardo
- Matteo

== Sources ==
- Miranda, Salvador. "Consistories for the creation of Cardinals 12th Century (1099-1198): Honorius II (1124-1130)". The Cardinals of the Holy Roman Church. Florida International University. OCLC 53276621.
