= Pope-elect =

Pope-elect is an elected pope who is not already a bishop, because of that, he is not legally Pope (Bishop of Rome) until his consecration as bishop.

- Pope-elect Stephen - elected pope in 752 died before his consecration as bishop.
- Pope-elect Celestine II - elected pope in 1124 resigned before his consecration as bishop.

== See also ==
- Pope (disambiguation)
