= Saxo de Anagnia =

Saxo de Anagnia (Sasso, Sassone) was a Roman Catholic Cardinal, and Cardinal-priest of the titulus of S. Stefano al Monte Celio (S. Stefano Rotondo) in Rome. He was a native of Anagni, and a member of the family of the Conti di Anagni. Dumas points out that there is no positive evidence of the family connection.

He is first noticed as a scriptor in the papal chancellery and chaplain of Pope Paschal II.

== Cardinal ==
Saxo was created a cardinal by Pope Paschal II, at the latest in 1116.

== Election of Gelasius II ==
Cardinal Saxo took part in the Papal election of Gelasius II, which took place in the walled monastic compound, the Palladium (S. Maria in Pallara), S. Maria in Pallara belonged to the Benedictine Congregation of Montecassino, and was the residence of Cardinal Giovanni of Gaeta (Joannes Gaetanus), the papal chancellor, who was also a Benedictine monk. Cardinal Giovanni Gaetani was elected pope on 24 January 1118. This election provoked unrest in Rome, and the papal court was forced to flee the troops of the Emperor Henry V on 2 March. He was, or became, a vocal opponent of Pope Calixtus' conciliatory policy, supporting the Pierleoni faction in Roman politics.

Cardinal Saxo subscribed papal documents on 17 April and 16 May 1222 at the Lateran, but in August he was in Würzburg.

In 1122, Pope Calixtus II sent a committee of cardinals to Germany to attempt to work out a permanent solution to the Investiture Controversy. The members were Cardinal-Bishop Lamberto Scannabecchi of Ostia; Cardinal-priest Saxo de Anagnia; and Cardinal-deacon Gregorius Papareschi. The treaties were signed on 23 September 1122. Cardinal Saxo was still with the emperor in Strasbourg on 24 January 1123.

== Election of 1124 ==
Pope Calixtus died in Rome of a sudden fever on 13 or 14 December 1124. It fell to the six cardinal bishops, according to the constitution In nomine Domini of Nicholas II, to nominate the next pope: Crescentius of Sabina, Pietro Senex of Porto, Lambertus Scannabecchi of Ostia, Guilelmus of Palestrina, Vitalis of Albano, and Gilles (Aegidius) of Tusculum. A leading candidate, the choice of "the people", was Cardinal Saxo of S. Stefano. On 15 or 16 December, the cardinal bishops chose Theobaldus Boccadipecora (Buccapecus), the Cardinal Priest of S. Anastasia, whose election was ratified unanimously by the rest of the cardinals. Immediately after the election, Cardinal Saxo, a supporter of the Frangipani and Cardinal Lamberto, and a very disappointed papal candidate, had a confrontation with Cardinal Benedict, a supporter of Theobaldus, calling him simplex et idiota.

During the election Roberto Frangipani carried out a coup-d'état, proclaiming Cardinal Lambertus Scannabecchi Pope Honorius II. There was no canonical election. Theobaldus resigned immediately that same day, whether willingly or under duress is uncertain. Seven days later, stricken with guilt and remorse, Lamberto resigned his false papacy, though the cardinals apparently reelected or confirmed his office.

In 1125 or 1128, Honorius II sent Cardinal Saxo and Leo Frangipane as legates to Naples to return prisoners who had been captured and detained.

== Election of 1130 and schism ==
When Pope Honorius died, late in the afternoon of 13 February 1130, the cardinals gathered around him did not inform the cardinals of the Pierleoni faction or the senior Cardinal-bishop, Petrus Senex, that the pope had died. Neither did they inform the magistrates of the city of Rome, who only learned of the fact when they assembled after dawn at the church of S. Marco to pay a collective call on the pope. After nightfall, the body of the dead pope was buried in the cloister of S. Gregorio and S. Andrea, by several laymen, without a funeral service. During the night, the cardinals inside the monastery held a meeting at which they elected Cardinal Gregory Papareschi pope. Cardinal Petrus of S. Susanna had a tart rebuke for the cardinals on that matter: "They gathered themselves together at some altar in the darkness, and, wishing to claim the title to an evil deed, they fabricated for themselves the deacon of S. Angelo as an idol in their rash boldness of zeal." Gregorovius states, "The proceeding was entirely contrary to law, and Gregory's action was altogether uncanonical.

At dawn, the body of Honorius was dug up again, and carried along with Papareschi to the Lateran Basilica. They were accompanied by the laymen of the Frangipani faction and the faction's cardinals. The body was buried again, in the Lateran, with a full funeral, and Papareschi was consecrated a bishop and enthroned as Innocent II.

After dawn, the senior-cardinal bishop, Petrus Senex, met with the other cardinals, the important Roman clergy, the magistrates and leading citizens, and the people of Rome, in anticipation of the possible announcement of the death of the pope. They were prepared to give Honorius II a funeral befitting a pope. The meeting took place at the church of S. Marco, at the bottom of the steps to the Capitol, which was convenient for the magistrates and also for the Pierleoni, whose houses were nearby. When they heard of the doings at the Lateran, they began their own electoral meeting, in the light of the coup-d-état which was underway. Cardinal Pietro gave his nomination and vote to Cardinal Pietro Pierleoni, who became Pope Anacletus II. Anacletus was acclaimed as pope by the cardinals, clergy, magistrates, nobles, and people of Rome. He was enthroned at S. Peter's Basilica on 15 February, and on 16 February he took possession of the Lateran.

Cardinal Saxo signed the Electoral Decree of Anacletus II on 14 February 1130. In the schism of 1130, Saxo followed the Obedience of Anacletus II, and became his chancellor.

The latest documentary appearance of Saxo's name is in a papal bull of 14 September 1131. His successor as chancellor, Cardinal Matthaeus of S. Pietro in Vincoli, first appears on 11 October 1133. His successor as Cardinal-priest of S. Stefano, Martinus, first subscribes on 23 January 1133.

== Bibliography ==
- Brixius, Johannes M. (1912). Die Mitglieder des Kardinalkollegiums von 1130–1181. Berlin.
- Gregorovius, Ferdinand (1896), History of Rome in the Middle Ages. Volume IV. part 2, second edition (London: George Bell, 1896).
- Hüls, Rudolf (1977). Kardinäle, Klerus und Kirchen Roms: 1049–1130 (in German). Bibliothek des Deutschen Historischen Instituts in Rom. ISBN 978-3-484-80071-7.
- Jaffé, Philippus (1885). Regesta pontificum Romanorum ab condita Ecclesia ad annum post Christum natum MCXCVIII (in Latin). Vol. Tomus primus (second ed.). Leipzig: Veit.
- Klewitz, Hans-Walter (1957). Reformpapsttum und Kardinalkolleg. Die Entstehung des Kardinalkollegiums. Studien über die Wiederherstellung der römischen Kirche in Süditalien durch das Reformpapsttum. Das Ende des Reformpapsttums (in German). Hermann Gentner Verlag, Darmstadt.
- Watterich, J. B. M. (1862). Pontificum Romanorum qui fuerunt inde ab exeunte saeculo IX usque ad finem saeculi XIII vitae: ab aequalibus conscriptae (in Latin). Vol. Tom. II. Leipzig: G. Engelmann.
- Zenker, Barbara (1964). Die Mitglieder des Kardinalkollegiums von 1130 bis 1159 (in German). Würzburg.

=== External links ===
- Dumas, Enrico (2017). "Sassone di Anagni." (in Italian) Dizionario Biografico degli Italiani Volume 90 (2017).
