= 1130 papal election =

Election of Catholic Pope Innocent II

Papal election 1130

Dates and location
- 14 February 1130 monastery of S. Gregorio, Rome

Key officials
- Dean: Pietro Senex

Elected pope
- Gregorio Papareschi; Name taken: Innocent II
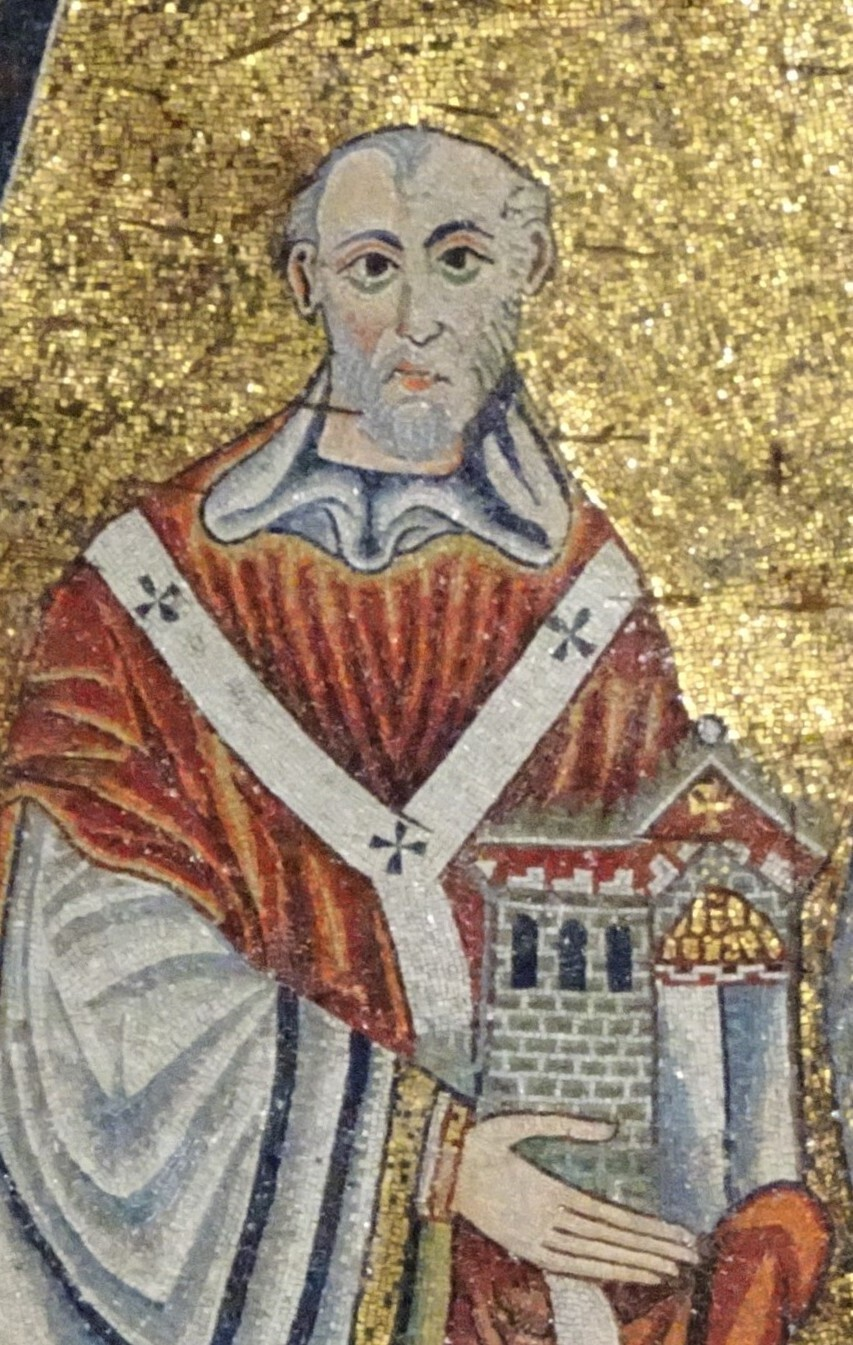

A papal election was held on 14 February 1130, after the death of Pope Honorius II, and resulted in a double election. Part of the cardinals, led by Cardinal-Chancellor Aymery de la Châtre, elected Gregorio Papareschi as Innocent II, but the rest of them refused to recognize him and elected Cardinal Pietro Pierleoni, who took the name of Anacletus II. Although Anacletus had the support of the majority of the cardinals, the Catholic Church today considers Innocent II to have been the legitimate pope and Anacletus II the antipope.

The double election was a result of the growing tensions inside the College of Cardinals concerning the policy of the Holy See towards the Holy Roman Empire, initiated by the Concordat of Worms (1122), which ended the investiture controversy. Several, particularly older, cardinals considered the compromise achieved in Worms as desertion of the principles of the Gregorian Reform, and inclined to accept it only as a tactical move. They supported the traditional alliance of the Papacy with the Normans in southern Italy. Some of them were connected to old monastic centers in Southern Italy such as Montecassino. One of their leaders was Cardinal Pierleoni, representative of one of the most powerful families of Rome.

The opposite faction was headed by Aymery de la Châtre, who was named cardinal and chancellor of the Holy See shortly after signing the Concordat of Worms and was one of the main architects of the new policy. He and his adherents looked at the compromise as a good solution both for the Church and the Emperor, and did not trust the Norman vassals of the Holy See, who expressed some expansionist tendencies. It seems that at least some major representatives of this faction had strong connections to the "new spirituality", meaning the new religious orders such as regular canons. Besides, they were allied with the Roman family of Frangipani, opponents of the Pierleoni family.

In the last weeks of the lifetime of Pope Honorius II the cardinals, fearing the possible schism, made an agreement that the new pope would be elected by the commission of eight of them, including two cardinal-bishops, three cardinal-priests and three cardinal-deacons.

== Cardinals ==
The College of Cardinals had probably 43 (or 42) members in February 1130. It seems that no more than 37 (36) were present at Rome on the death of Honorius II:

Elector	Faction	Cardinalatial Title	Elevated	Elevator	Notes
Pietro Senex	Anacletan	Bishop of Porto	1102	Paschalis II	Dean of the College of Cardinals
Guillaume	Innocentine	Bishop of Palestrina	March 1123	Callixtus II	Committee member
Matthieu, O.S.B.Cluny	Innocentine	Bishop of Albano	December 1126	Honorius II	
Giovanni of Camaldoli, O.S.B.Cam.	Innocentine	Bishop of Ostia	December 1126	Honorius II	
Corrado della Suburra	Innocentine	Bishop of Sabina	1113/14	Paschalis II	Committee member; future Pope Anastasius IV (1153–54)
Bonifacio	Anacletan	Priest of S. Marco	ca. 1100	Paschalis II	prior cardinalium
Gregorio de Ceccano	Anacletan	Priest of SS. XII Apostoli	ca. 1102 (deposed 1112, reinstated in March 1123)	Paschalis II (reinstated by Callixtus II)	Future Antipope Victor IV (1138)
Pietro Pierleoni, O.S.B.Cluny	Anacletan	Priest of S. Maria in Trastevere	1111/12	Paschalis II	Committee member; elected Pope Anacletus II (1130–38)
Petrus Pisanus	Anacletan	Priest of S. Susanna	1112/13	Paschalis II	Committee member
Desiderius	Anacletan	Priest of S. Prassede	1115	Paschalis II	
Giovanni Cremense	Innocentine	Priest of S. Crisogono	ca. 1116/17	Paschalis II	
Saxo de Anagnia	Anacletan	Priest of S. Stefano in Celiomonte	1117	Paschalis II	
Crescenzio di Anagni	Anacletan	Priest of SS. Marcellino e Pietro	1117	Paschalis II	
Sigizo	Anacletan	Priest of S. Sisto	1117 or 1120	Paschalis II (or Callixtus II)	
Pietro Ruffino	Innocentine	Priest of SS. Silvestro e Martino	March 1118	Gelasius II	Committee member; nephew of Paschalis II
Pietro	Anacletan	Priest of S. Marcello	1120	Callixtus II	
Gerardo Caccianemici, C.R.S.F.	Innocentine	Priest of S. Croce in Gerusalemme	March 1123	Callixtus II	Future Pope Lucius II (1144–45)
Matteo	Anacletan	Priest of S. Pietro in Vincoli	March 1123	Callixtus II	
Comes	Anacletan	Priest of S. Sabina	March 1123	Callixtus II	Several sources erroneously identify him with Cardinal-Deacon Comes of S. Maria in Aquiro (1116–1126)
Gregorio	Anacletan	Priest of S. Balbina	1125	Honorius II	
Alderico	Anacletan	Priest of SS. Giovanni e Paolo	1125	Honorius II	
Petrus	Innocentine	Priest of S. Anastasia	1126	Honorius II	
Anselmo	Innocentine	Priest of S. Lorenzo in Lucina	1127/28	Honorius II	
Lectifredo	Anacletan	Priest of S. Vitale	ca. 1128	Honorius II	
Joselmo	Innocentine	Priest of S. Cecilia	1128/29	Honorius II	
Enrico	Anacletan	Priest of S. Prisca	1129 (?)	Honorius II (?)	Several sources indicate that he was created only by Anacletus II
Gregorio, O.S.B.	Anacletan	Deacon of S. Eustachio	Before 1110	Paschalis II	Protodeacon (?)
Gregorio Papareschi, C.R.Lat.	Innocentine	Deacon of S. Angelo in Pescheria	1115/16	Paschalis II	Committee member; elected Pope Innocent II (1130–43)
Romano	Innocentine	Deacon of S. Maria in Portico	1119	Callixtus II	
Ionathas (Gionata)	Anacletan	Deacon of SS. Cosma e Damiano	December 1120	Callixtus II	Committee member
Angelo	Anacletan	Deacon of S. Maria in Domnica	March 1123	Callixtus II	
Giovanni Dauferio	Anacletan	Deacon of S. Nicola in Carcere	March 1123	Callixtus II	
Gregorio Tarquini	Innocentine	Deacon of SS. Sergio e Bacco	March 1123	Callixtus II	
Aymery de la Châtre, C.R.S.M.R.	Innocentine	Deacon of S. Maria Nuova	March 1123	Callixtus II	Committee member; Chancellor of the Holy Roman Church
Stefano Stornato	Anacletan (?)	Deacon of S. Lucia in Orthea	1125	Honorius II	
Alberto Teodoli	Innocentine	Deacon of S. Teodoro	September 1127	Honorius II	
Guido del Castello	Innocentine	Deacon of S. Maria in Via Lata	ca. 1128/29	Honorius II	Future Pope Celestine II (1143–44)

Probably six cardinals were absent from Rome:

Elector	Faction	Cardinalatial Title	Elevated	Elevator	Notes
Gilles of Paris, O.S.B.Cluny	Anacletan	Bishop of Tusculum	March 1123	Callixtus II	Papal legate in Outremer
Guido	Innocentine	Bishop of Tivoli	ca. 1124	Callixtus II	
Amico, O.S.B.Cas.	Anacletan	Priest of SS. Nereo ed Achilleo	1117	Paschalis II	Abbot of S. Vincenzo al Volturno
Uberto Lanfranchi	Innocentine	Priest of S. Clemente	March 1123	Callixtus II	Papal legate in Spain; future Archbishop of Pisa (1133–37)
Rustico	Innocentine	Priest of S. Ciriaco	1128	Honorius II	Archpriest of the Vatican Basilica; papal legate in Upper Italy
Oderisio de Sangro, O.S.B.Cas.	Anacletan	Deacon of S. Agata	1111/12	Paschalis II	Former Abbot of Montecassino (1123–26)

== Preparations for the election ==
The parties of the College of Cardinals were of different sizes. The party of Aymeric was smaller, with 19 members, while that of his opponents 24, but the party of the Chancellor was certainly better organized.

One of the undeniable aspects of that division is that the Anacletans were mainly senior cardinals, veterans of the investiture controversy, created either by Paschalis II or early in the pontificate of Callixtus II, while Innocentine cardinals with few exceptions were created after Concordat of Worms (1122), which established peace with the Emperor. Out of nineteen cardinals created before 1122, only five supported the Chancellor, while out of twenty four appointed from that time onwards as many as fourteen. The other possible reasons for such radical tensions in the College (e.g. national divisions, connections to different spiritual centres) are widely discussed by historians without final conclusion.

In the elected committee the party of Aymeric had 5 members out 8. This was due to the way of their election – each of the three cardinalatial orders had to elect their own representatives. Although adherents of Aymeric were in the minority in the whole College, they had a majority among cardinal-bishops and cardinal-deacons, while their opponents were mainly cardinal-priests. Therefore, the faction of the Chancellor acquired a majority in the electoral body

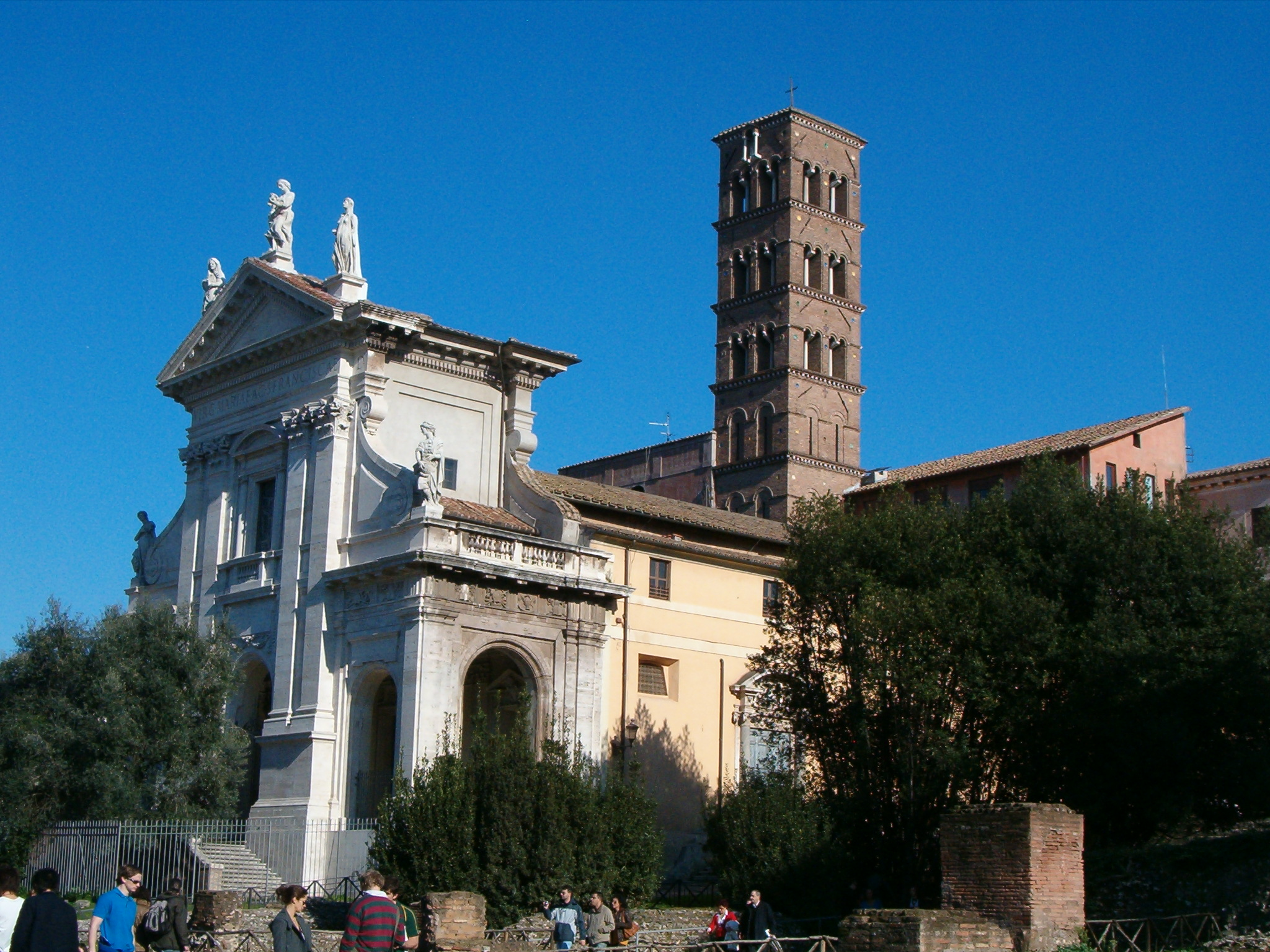
The church of S. Maria Nuova (today S. Francesca Romana) — the titular deaconry of chancellor Aymeric and the place of consecration of Innocent II

The following cardinals were elected to the committee (the opponents of Aymeric are denoted with †):

- Cardinal-Bishops (two adherents of Aymeric)
  - Guillaume, Bishop of Palestrina
  - Corrado della Suburra, Bishop of Sabina
- Cardinal-Priests (two opponents and one adherent of Aymeric)
  - Pietro Pierleoni, O.S.B.Cluny, Priest of S. Maria in Trastevere †
  - Pietro Pisano, Priest of S. Susanna †
  - Pietro Ruffino, Priest of SS. Silvestro e Martino
- Cardinal-Deacons (two adherents and one opponent of Aymeric)
  - Gregorio Papareschi, C.R.L., Deacon of S. Angelo in Pescheria
  - Aymery de la Châtre, C.R.S.M.R., Deacon of S. Maria Nuova and Chancellor of the Holy See
  - Gionata, Deacon of SS. Cosma e Damiano †

== Death of Honorius II and the election of Innocent II ==
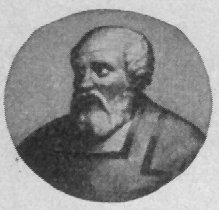
Pope Honorius II.

Honorius II died in the night 13/14 February 1130 in the Roman monastery of S. Gregorio, after a long illness. Cardinal Aymeric arranged a hasty burial there and immediately called the members of the committee to the monastery to proceed for the election of a new pope. But Cardinals Pierleoni and Gionata, realising that the commission certainly would elect a supporter of the Chancellor, withdrew from it hoping that a lack of quorum would prevent it from functioning. But Aymeric ignored this fact and the commission assembled with six members only. Despite the protests of Cardinal Pietro Pisano, who was a distinguished canonist, the committee elected one of its members, Cardinal Gregorio Papareschi of S. Angelo, who accepted the election and took the name Innocent II. He was enthroned in the Lateran Basilica early in the morning on February 14. His election was almost immediately recognized by six other cardinals: two bishops (Giovanni of Ostia and Mathieu of Albano) and four priests (Joselmo of S. Cecilia, Petrus of S. Anastasia and Giovanni of S. Crisogono; the identity of the fourth one is uncertain, but most probably it was Gerardo of S. Croce). In a short time they were joined also by the next eight cardinals.

== The election of Anacletus II ==
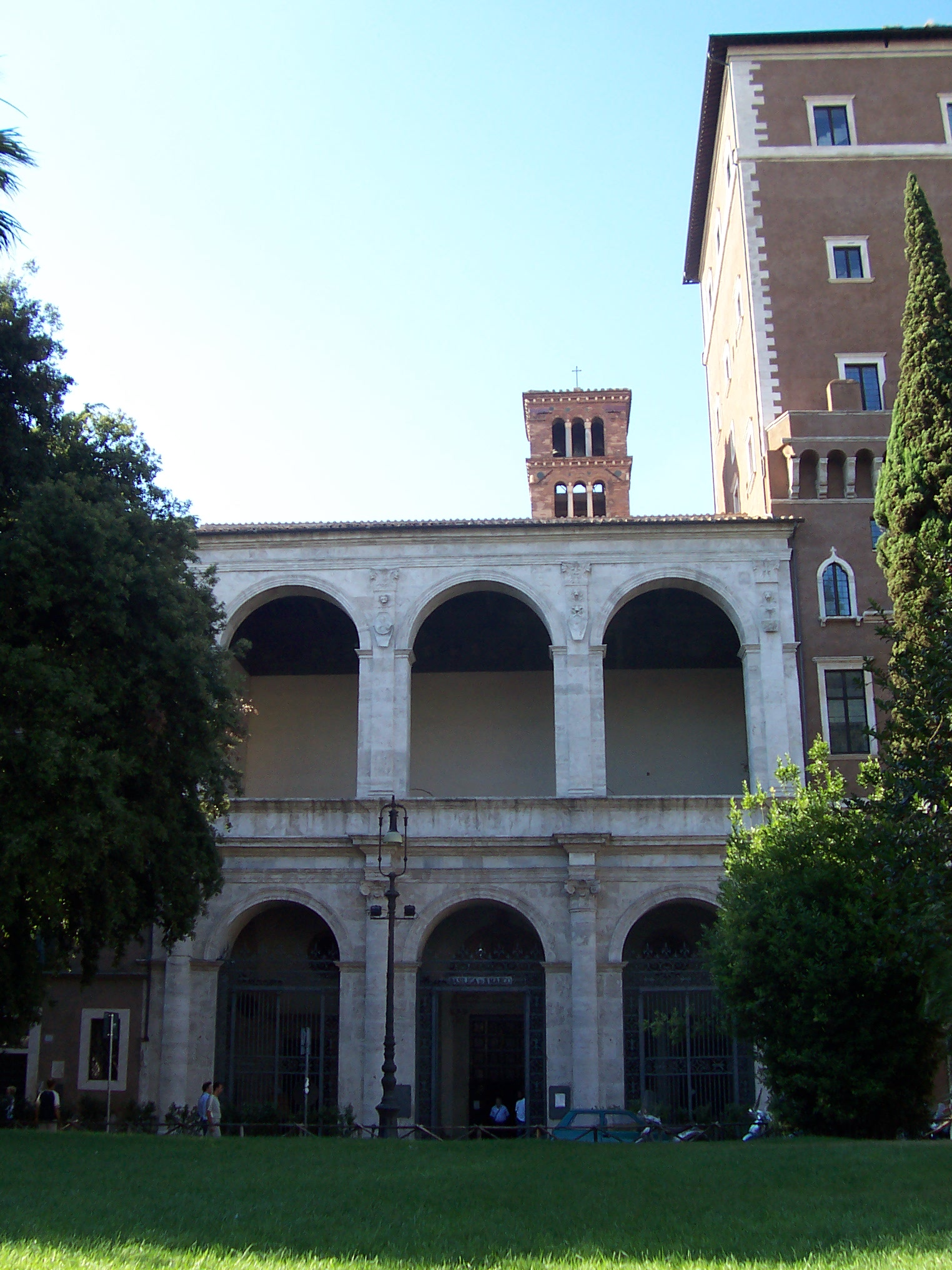
Basilica of S. Marco, the place of the election of Anacletus II.

The majority of the cardinals, however, did not recognize Innocent II under the influence of Pietro Pisano, who, as a distinguished canonist, declared that his election was invalid. On February 14 in the morning the opponents of Aymeric and his candidate assembled under the leadership of Pietro Pierleoni in the church of S. Marco to elect the new Pope. Initially, Cardinal Pierleoni proposed the election of the Dean of the College Pietro Senex of Porto, but he refused to accept the papal dignity. Then the cardinals unanimously elected Pierleoni himself, who took the name of Anacletus II.

It is not known how many cardinals elected Anacletus II. The decree proclaiming his election issued on the same day was subscribed by 14 cardinals:

- Bishop Pietro Senex of Porto,
- Priests Gregorio de Ceccano of SS. Apostoli, Saxo of S. Stefano, Pietro of S. Marcello, Comes of S. Sabina, Gregorio of S. Balbina, Crescenzio of SS. Marcellino e Pietro, Lectifredo of S. Vitale, Pietro Pisano of S. Susanna, Matteo of S. Pietro in Vincoli and Enrico of S. Prisca,
- Deacons Gregorio of S. Eustachio, Gionata of SS. Cosma e Damiano and Angelo of S. Maria in Domnica.

It is not known whether the remaining five adherents of Pierleoni, who are believed to have been present at Rome, participated in the electoral proceedings. There is no doubt, however, that the lesser clergy of Rome was represented in the election. The electoral decree of Anacletus II bears the subscriptions of some of them, including Subdeacon Gregorio, primicerius scholae cantorum, who was appointed Cardinal-Deacon of S. Maria in Aquiro the following February 21, and Rainiero, Archpriest of the Patriarchal Liberian Basilica.

== Division of the College of Cardinals ==
The double election resulted with the open split of the College of Cardinals into two parties. Their compositions can be established in the following way:

- Liber Pontificalis mentions the names of 16 cardinals who supported Innocent II from the very beginning. To them should be added two other cardinals (Guido of Tivoli and Rustico of S. Ciriaco), whose attitude is attested by the fact that they subscribed the bulls of Innocent II.
- The obedience of Anacletus II may be reconstructed basing on the letter addressed to king Lothair III of Germany by his cardinals soon after his coronation. This letter bears the subscriptions of 27 cardinals, including five created by Anacletus II on February 21, a Friday of the ember week. To them should be added also cardinal Oderisio of S. Agata, who later subscribed the bulls issued by Anacletus II.

Therefore, at the beginning of the schism 18 cardinals belonged to the College of Innocent II, and 28 to the College of Anacletus II.

The Innocentine cardinals, who are not mentioned by Liber Pontificalis, and the Anacletan, who did not subscribe the letter to king Lothair, are denoted with †.

Obedience of Innocent II	Obedience of Anacletus II
1. Guillaume, bishop of Palestrina; 2. Giovanni of Camaldoli, O.S.B.Cam., bishop of Ostia; 3. Matthieu, O.S.B.Cluny, bishop of Albano; 4. Corrado della Suburra, bishop of Sabina; 5. Guido, bishop of Tivoli †; 6. Giovanni Cremense, priest of S. Crisogono; 7. Pietro Ruffino, priest of SS. Silvestro e Martino; 8. Gerardo Caccianemici, C.R.S.F., priest of S. Croce in Gerusalemme; 9. Uberto Lanfranchi, priest of S. Clemente; 10. Pierre, priest of S. Anastasia; 11. Anselmo, priest of S. Lorenzo in Lucina; 12. Joselmo, priest of S. Cecilia; 13. Rustico, priest of S. Ciriaco †; 14. Romano, deacon of S. Maria in Portico; 15. Gregorio Tarquini, deacon of SS. Sergio e Bacco; 16. Aymeric, C.R.S.M.R., deacon of S. Maria Nuova; 17. Alberto Teodoli, deacon of S. Teodoro; 18. Guido del Castello, deacon of S. Maria in Via Lata	1. Pietro Senex, bishop of Porto; 2. Gilles de Paris, O.S.B.Cluny, bishop of Tusculum; 3. Bonifazio, priest of S. Marco; 4. Gregorio de Ceccano, priest of SS. XII Apostoli; 5. Comes, priest of S. Sabina; 6. Pietro Pisano, priest of S. Susanna; 7. Desiderio, priest of S. Prassede; 8. Amico, O.S.B.Cas., priest of SS. Nereo ed Achilleo; 9. Sasso de’ Anagni, priest of S. Stefano al Monte Celio; 10. Sigizo, priest of S. Sisto; 11. Crescenzio di Anagni, priest of SS. Marcellino e Pietro; 12. Pietro, priest of S. Marcello; 13. Matteo, priest of S. Pietro in Vincoli; 14. Gregorio, priest of S. Balbina; 15. Alderico, priest of SS. Giovanni e Paolo; 16. Lectifredo, priest of S. Vitale; 17. Enrico, priest of S. Prisca; 18. Gregorio, O.S.B., deacon of S. Eustachio; 19. Oderisio di Sangro, O.S.B.Cas., deacon of S. Agata †; 20. Gionata, deacon of SS. Cosma e Damiano (appointed priest of S. Maria in Trastevere on February 21); 21. Angelo, deacon of S. Maria in Domnica; 22. Giovanni Dauferio, deacon of S. Nicola in Carcere (appointed priest of S. Pudenziana probably on March 22); 23. Stefano Stornato, deacon of S. Lucia in Orthea (appointed priest of S. Lorenzo in Damaso on February 21); New cardinals elevated on February 21, 1130: 1. Pietro, priest of S. Eusebio; 2. Gregorio, deacon of S. Maria in Aquiro; 3. Hermann, deacon of S. Angelo in Pescheria; 4. Silvio, deacon of S. Lucia in Septisolio; 5. Romano, deacon of S. Adriano

Stefano Stornato joined the obedience of Innocent II no later than 1132; Lectifredo of S. Vitale and Giovanni Dauferio did the same in 1133, Pietro Pisano in 1137, and Desiderio of S. Prassede shortly before the end of the schism in 1138. It seems that ca. 1135 Comes of S. Sabina also abandoned Anacletus II.

== The schism ==
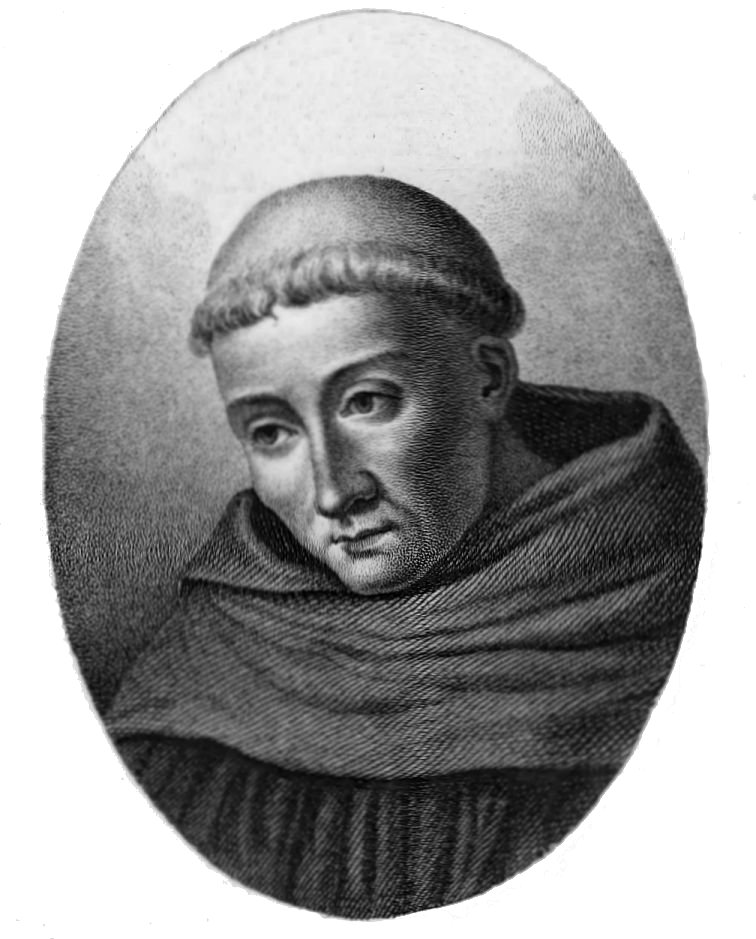
Bernard of Clairvaux, the main contributor to Innocent's victory in the subsequent schism

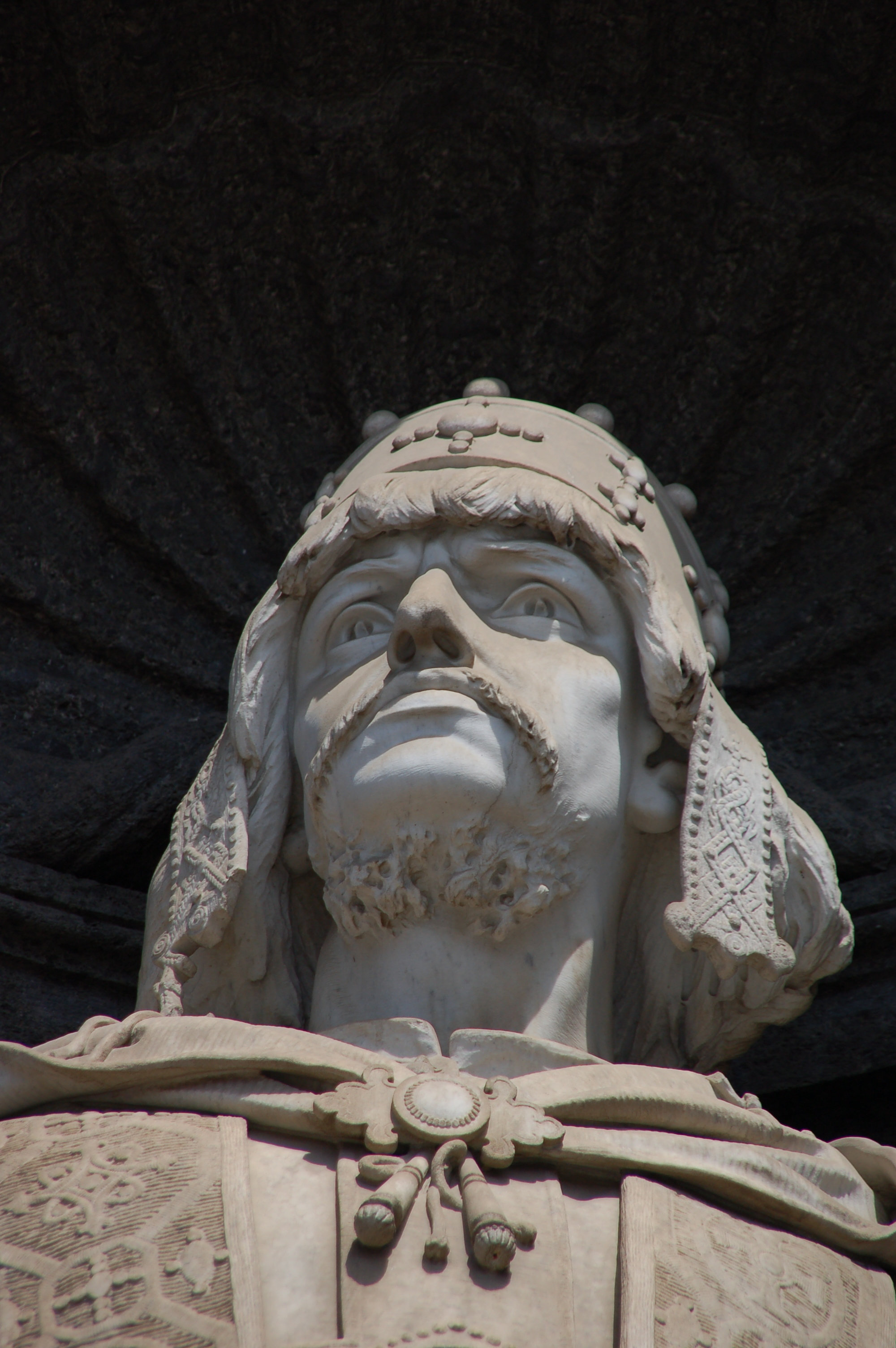
Roger II, main ally of Anacletus II, was named king of Sicily in exchange for this support

Both popes were consecrated and crowned on the same day, February 23. Innocent II received episcopal consecration from Cardinal Giovanni of Ostia in the church S. Maria Nuova, the titular deaconry of Chancellor Aymeric. Anacletus II was consecrated by Cardinal Pietro of Porto in the Vatican Basilica, which means that Anacletus took the advantage in the city from the very beginning. Almost all Roman aristocracy (with the significant exception of the Frangipani family), the majority of the lesser clergy and the people of Rome recognized Anacletus II and at the end of May Innocent II had to flee to France. After his defection to France even the Frangipani submitted to Anacletus.

In France, however, Innocent II found a strong ally in the person of Bernard of Clairvaux. Under Bernard's influence, almost all European monarchs and episcopates recognized the exiled Innocent II. Anacletus II, although he controlled Rome and the Patrimony of St. Peter, received the support only of the Normans of southern Italy, Scotland, Aquitaine, some cities in northern Italy (incl. Milan), and perhaps Outremer and probably also Poland.

Both elections were irregular, because they contradicted the rules established by the decree In Nomine Domini in 1059, but both sides defended the legality of the respective pontificates. The adherents of Anacletus argued that he was elected by the majority of the cardinals, lower clergy and the people of Rome. The partisans of Innocent II answered that Innocent II was elected by majority of the cardinal-bishops, who according to the decree In Nomine Domini had to play the preeminent role in the election. Their opponents answered with another version of the decree (false, but very popular at the time), which stated that the pope was elected by "cardinals" (meaning cardinal-priests and deacons), while cardinal-bishops could only express their approval or disapproval. Both parties used, by analogy, the Benedictine rule, which stated that in the case of a double election for abbot, the valid election was the one made by "the sounder part" (sanior pars) of the electors – but there was no consensus which part of the College was "sounder" in this case.

Decisive for the verdict about the legality of both pontificates were not the legal arguments, but the attitude of the Catholic world, which had almost universally recognized Innocent II. His main supporters were Abbot Bernard of Clairvaux, Archbishop of Magdeburg Norbert of Xanten and King Lothair III of Germany. The few secular lords who had initially supported Anacletus gradually abandoned his cause as lost; only King Roger II of Sicily, who had received the crown from Anacletus in exchange for support, stood at his side to the very end. Although Anacletus II was able to retain the control of the city of Rome and the Patrimony of St. Peter until his death in January 1138, his successor quickly made his submission to Innocent II, who is now regarded as true Pope.

== Bibliography ==
- Robinson, Ian Stuart (1990). The Papacy 1073–1198. Continuity and Innovation. Cambridge Medieval Textbooks. Cambridge University Press. ISBN 0-521-31922-6.
- Hüls, Rudolf (1977). Kardinäle, Klerus und Kirchen Roms: 1049–1130 (in German). Bibliothek des Deutschen Historischen Instituts in Rom. ISBN 978-3-484-80071-7.
- Klewitz, Hans-Walter (1957). Reformpapsttum und Kardinalkolleg. Die Entstehung des Kardinalkollegiums. Studien über die Wiederherstellung der römischen Kirche in Süditalien durch das Reformpapsttum. Das Ende des Reformpapsttums (in German). Hermann Gentner Verlag, Darmstadt.
- Bloch, Herbert (1986). MONTE CASSINO IN THE MIDDLE AGES VOLUME II. Rome.
- Jaffé, Philipp (1885). Regesta pontificum Romanorum ab condita Ecclesia ad annum post Christum natum MCXCVIII. Vol. I (in Latin). Leipzig. Archived from the original on 2020-10-03.
- Migne, Jacques Paul (1899). Patrologia Latina. Volumen 179 (in Latin). Internet Archive.
- Böhmer, Johann Friedrich; Petke, Wolfgang (1994). Regesta Imperii – Lothar III. und Ältere Staufer 1125–1197 (in German). Bayerische Staatsbibliothek. Archived from the original on 2017-05-28.
- Brixius, Johannes Matthias (1912). Die Mitglieder des Kardinalkollegiums von 1130–1181 (in German). Berlin: R. Trenkel.
- Anton Chroust, Das Wahldekret Anaklets II, (in:) Mitteilungen des Instituts für österreichische Geschichtsforschung, vol. 28, 1907, pp. 348–355
