= Benedictus of San Pietro in Vincoli =

Benedictus was a Roman Catholic Cardinal, and Cardinal-priest of the titulus of San Pietro in Vincoli in Rome, also called the titulus Eudoxiae. (Note: Benedictus of S. Pietro is often confused in the older material with Benedict of S. Pudenziana. Caution must be exercised. Hüls, p. 85, distinguishes three Benedicts in the sources, #1, #5, and #14.)

He was named a cardinal-priest by 1102, according to the Ancienniität Prinzip, developed by Rudolf Huls. At some point between 1102 and 1112, Cardinal Benedictus served as a witness to a libellus (Note: a brief, or a memorandum of understanding) in a dispute between the bishop of Sutri and the bishop of Tuscania over diocesan territory. His earliest surviving subscription occurs on 23 March 1112, in the Acta of the Lateran synod of Pope Paschal II.

Pope Paschal II died in Rome on 21 January 1118. The meeting to elect his successor was held at the monastery of the Palladium (Santa Maria in Pallara, near the Arch of Titus and the Arch of Constantine) for reasons of security. Cardinal Benedictus of S. Pietro in Vincoli was one of those present. During the enthronement ceremony, Cencius Frangipani and his supporters broke into the monastery, seized and abused the pope and others, and carried Gelasius off to one of their prisons. He was rescued, but, on the approach of Henry V to Rome, he fled to Gaeta, to Capua, and then to Pisa. Benedictus is not mentioned in connection with the consecration of the new pope at Gaeta, or in the flight to Pisa and France. When Pope Gelasius died in France, at the abbey of Cluny, Benedictus was not present, nor was he present at the meeting in Rome which received the notification of the election of Pope Calixtus II and issued the Act of Confirmation of the election, but he was one of a group of cardinals who had not been present who immediately wrote to the electors at Cluny, in February 1119, expressing their approval and adherence.

Pope Calixtus reached Rome on 3 June 1120. He embarked on a tour of south Italy in mid-July, and was away from Rome until the first week in December. Cardinal Benedictus travelled with the papal curia, and subscribed documents on 24 September and in October in Benevento. Back in the Lateran, he took part on 3 January 1121 in Pope Calixtus' determination of the rights of the archbishops of Pisa in consecrating bishops in Corsica. He also subscribed at the Lateran on 7 January, 14 January and 17 April.

Benedictus was present at the uncanonical appointment of Cardinal Lamberto Scannabecchi as Honorius II on 15 December 1124. The uncensored version of Pandulf of Pisa's "Life of Honorius" quotes Cardinal Saxo de Anagnia, a supporter of the Frangipani and Cardinal Lamberto, calling him simplex et idiota in an argument.

He continued to subscribe papal documents from time to time in 1125 and 1126.

Cardinal Benedictus' latest appearance in the surviving literature is in connection with a lawsuit on 19 February 1127. A dispute involving Cardinal Bonifacius of S. Marco eventually reached the papal audience hall for a decision, with both Pope Honorius and twenty-three cardinals sitting as judges. The Archconfraternity of the Holy Cross of S. Marco was accused of usurping the title and precedence of the Archconfraternity of the Holy Cross of the Basilica of the XII Apostles. The date and year of his death is unknown.

== Bibliography ==
- Brixius, Johannes M. (1912). Die Mitglieder des Kardinalkollegiums von 1130–1181. Berlin.
- Hüls, Rudolf (1977). Kardinäle, Klerus und Kirchen Roms: 1049–1130 (in German). Bibliothek des Deutschen Historischen Instituts in Rom. ISBN 978-3-484-80071-7.
- Jaffé, Philippus (1885). Regesta pontificum Romanorum ab condita Ecclesia ad annum post Christum natum MCXCVIII (in Latin). Vol. Tomus primus (second ed.). Leipzig: Veit.
- Klewitz, Hans-Walter (1957). Reformpapsttum und Kardinalkolleg. Die Entstehung des Kardinalkollegiums. Studien über die Wiederherstellung der römischen Kirche in Süditalien durch das Reformpapsttum. Das Ende des Reformpapsttums (in German). Hermann Gentner Verlag, Darmstadt.
- Watterich, J. B. M. (1862). Pontificum Romanorum qui fuerunt inde ab exeunte saeculo IX usque ad finem saeculi XIII vitae: ab aequalibus conscriptae (in Latin). Vol. Tom. II. Leipzig: G. Engelmann.
- Zenker, Barbara (1964). Die Mitglieder des Kardinalkollegiums von 1130 bis 1159 (in German). Würzburg.
