= Jonathan (cardinal) =

Roman Catholic cardinal

Jonathan (fl. 1120–1130) was a Roman Catholic cardinal who played a major role in two divisive papal elections.

Jonathan (Italian Gionata, Latin Ionathas) was an ally of the Pierleoni family. He was ordained as cardinal deacon of Santi Cosma e Damiano by Pope Calixtus II at the time of his coronation as pope in December 1120. He succeeded Pietro Pierleoni in this position. In 1123 or 1124, he represented Calixtus as papal legate to Siena. He was a witness to papal bulls between 3 January 1121 and 1 April 1124.

In the 1124 papal election, Jonathan nominated Cardinal Teobaldo Boccapecci, who was unanimously elected and took the name Celestine II. Given Teobaldo's advanced age, his election was probably intended as a stopgap. The election was immediately overthrown by the Frangipani, who engineered the election of Honorius II instead. Jonathan quickly accepted the new pope. He signed a bull of Honorius II on 6 May 1125. In 1127, he was named as legate alongside Cardinal Conrad of Santa Pudenziana to the abbey of Farfa. On this mission, he consecrated Abbot Adenulf. The last bull of Honorius that he subscribed is dated 24 March 1129.

In the 1130 papal election, Jonathan was one of the three cardinal deacons appointed to the commission entrusted with the election. Upon realizing that the commission had been engineered by the papal chancellor Haimeric to elect his favoured candidate, Jonathan and Pierleoni withdrew. Sent to secure Castel Sant'Angelo and coolly received by the guards, they realized what was afoot and refused to return to the commission. On 14 February, they led the majority of cardinals in electing Pierleoni as Anacletus II while the reduced commissioned elected Innocent II.

Jonathan succeeded Pierleoni a second time, when Anacletus II appointed him cardinal priest of Santa Maria in Trastevere on Holy Saturday 1130. He signed Anacletus' bulls dated 27 March and 24 April that year.

== Bibliography ==
- Miranda, Salvador (2018) [1998]. "Pope Callistus II (1119–1124): Consistory of December 1120 (II)". The Cardinals of the Holy Roman Church: Biographical Dictionary. Florida International University Libraries.
- Robinson, Ian S. (1996). The Papacy, 1073–1198: Continuity and Innovation. Cambridge University Press.
- Stroll, Mary (1987). The Jewish Pope: Ideology and Politics in the Papal Schism of 1130. Brill.
- Stroll, Mary (1997). The Medieval Abbey of Farfa: Target of Papal and Imperial Ambitions. Brill.
- Stroll, Mary (2004). Calixtus the Second, 1119–1124: A Pope Born to Rule. Brill.
