= Petrus Pisanus =

Roman Catholic cardinal

Petrus Pisanus (died in 1145 or later) was a Roman Catholic Cardinal. He began his career in papal service as a scriptor in the chancellery. He was appointed Deacon of San Giorgio in Velabro, and then promoted Cardinal-priest of Santa Susanna. He served briefly as papal legate in Corsica, before becoming a permanent member of the papal court. He participated in the papal elections of 1118, 1124, and 1130. In 1130, he chose to support the Obedience of Anacletus II rather than that of Innocent II. After Anacletus died in 1138, he joined the Obedience of Innocent II, and survived the purge of 1139.

== Education ==
He was learned in canon law, the decretals and civil law.

Petrus began his career as a Scriptor and Chaplain of Pope Paschal II by 1104.

== Cardinal deacon ==
He was already a cardinal-deacon by 16 October 1113, when he subscribes himself as "Petrus Pisanus sancti Adriani diaconus".

On 21 and 22 December 1116, Petrus, still a cardinal-deacon, was in Trastevere with Pope Paschal, probably at the papal residence at S. Maria Antiqua, where he subscribed a papal decree in favor of the canons of S. Maria in Portu Ravennatis.

== Cardinal priest ==
Pope Paschal died on 21 January 1118. Cardinal Petrus Pisanus of Santa Susanna was present at the election of his successor, Cardinal Giovanni Gaetani, who took the name Gelasius II. He was elected on the Vigil of the Conversion of St. Paul the Apostle, January 24. Forced to flee Rome because of the violence of the Frangipani and the approach of the army of the Emperor Henry V, Gelasius took refuge in Gaeta, where he was consecrated a bishop and enthroned by three cardinal-bishops, Lamberto of Ostia, Pietro of Porto, and Vitalis of Albano. The papal court returned to Rome early in July, after the withdrawal of Henry V, but factional fighting in Rome forced them to flee again at the end of August, first to Pisa, then, Genoa, then France.

=== Papal legate ===
On 13 September 1118, Petrus Pisanus was in Pisa, along with the exiled Pope Gelasius, where he subscribed a document. In autumn 1118, Pope Gelasius sent Cardinal Petrus as his legate in Corsica. He was there at least until April 1119. Gelasius, in exile from Rome, died at the monastery of Cluny on 29 January 1119. Petrus Pisanus was not able to be present at the papal election that followed immediately. Archbishop Guy de Bourgogne was elected pope on 2 February 1119, and took the name Calixtus II. Petrus finally joined the new pope at Auxerre in December 1119. From Auxerre, he and the papal court proceeded to Valence (27 February 1120), Gap (11 March), Pisa (14 May), and Volterra (21 May). They reached Rome on 3 June.

=== Elections of 1130 ===
Honorius II died in Rome in the monastery of S. Gregory on the Clivus Scauri, near the Colosseum, on 13 February 1130, after a protracted illness. Even before the pope was dead, however, a group of cardinals in his entourage formed a plan to get the others to agree to choosing the next pope by a committee. The committee was to consist of two cardinal-bishops, three cardinal priests, and two cardinal-deacons. The committee was weighted in favor of the candidate of the Chancellor Cardinal Aymeric and his Frangipani supporters, Gregorio Papareschi, who was in fact a member of the committee. Cardinal Petrus Pisanus, who was present at the meeting and who was offered a place on the committee, places the blame for the plot squarely on the shoulders of Cardinal Aymeric. The meeting and its subject matter were a violation of church law. In the event, the committee never met.

When Honorius died, late in the afternoon of 13 February, the cardinals gathered around him did not set their plan into motion. Neither did they inform the cardinals of the Pierleoni faction that the pope had died. Neither did they inform the magistrates of the city of Rome, who only learned of the fact when they assembled after dawn at the church of S. Marco to pay a collective call on the pope. After nightfall, the body of the dead pope was buried in the cloister of S. Gregorio and S. Andrea, by several laymen, without a funeral service. Cardinal Petrus Senex, the senior cardinal-bishop, stated firmly, "No mention can be made about a successor until the pope has been buried." During the night, the cardinals inside the monastery held a meeting at which they elected Cardinal Gregory Papareschi pope. Cardinal Petrus of S. Susanna was present, but had a tart rebuke for the cardinals on that matter: "They gathered themselves together at some altar in the darkness, and, wishing to claim the title to an evil deed, they fabricated for themselves the deacon of S. Angelo as an idol in their rash boldness of zeal." Gregorovius states, "The proceeding was entirely contrary to law, and Gregory's action was altogether uncanonical.

Nonetheless, he supported the election of Pope Anacletus II on the morning of 14 February 1130, and subscribed his electoral decree.

=== Supporter of Innocent II ===
He changed sides, however, late in 1137 or early in 1138. He was impelled, at least in part, by the persuasion of Bernard of Clairvaux. Cardinal Petrus Pisanus was reconciled with Innocent II, and signed documents for him on January 8, 1138, which was seventeen days before the death of Anacletus II.

From 3 April to 8 April 1139, Pope Innocent held a council at the Lateran, attended, according to Otto of Frising, by more than a thousand prelates. During the council, all of the appointments of Anacletus II were declared null and void. Otto believed that the partisans of Anacletus were anathematized.

On 11 April 1139, he was one of five cardinals who subscribed Innocent II's confirmation of the property of the monastery of Prufenigen, diocese of Ratisbon. On the same day, a similar document was subscribed by six different cardinals.

According to Rudolf Hüls, his latest known signature is on a document of Pope Celestine II on 15 December 1145.

== Bibliography ==
- Brixius, Johannes M. (1912). Die Mitglieder des Kardinalkollegiums von 1130-1181,(in German) Berlin: Trenkel 1912.
- Gregorovius, Ferdinand (1896), History of Rome in the Middle Ages. Volume IV. part 2, second edition (London: George Bell, 1896).
- Hüls, Rudolf (1977). Kardinäle, Klerus und Kirchen Roms: 1049–1130 (in German). Bibliothek des Deutschen Historischen Instituts in Rom. ISBN 978-3-484-80071-7.
- Jaffé, Philippus (1885). Regesta pontificum Romanorum ab condita Ecclesia ad annum post Christum natum MCXCVIII (in Latin). Vol. Tomus primus (second ed.). Leipzig: Veit.
- Klewitz, Hans-Walter (1957). Reformpapsttum und Kardinalkolleg. Die Entstehung des Kardinalkollegiums. Studien über die Wiederherstellung der römischen Kirche in Süditalien durch das Reformpapsttum. Das Ende des Reformpapsttums (in German). Hermann Gentner Verlag, Darmstadt.
- Watterich, J. B. M. (1862). Pontificum Romanorum qui fuerunt inde ab exeunte saeculo IX usque ad finem saeculi XIII vitae: ab aequalibus conscriptae (in Latin). Vol. Tom. II. Leipzig: G. Engelmann.
- Zöpffel, Richard (1871). Die Papstwahlen und die mit ihnen im Zusammenhange stehenden Ceremonien von 11.-14. Jahrhunderts. Beilage: Die Doppelwahl des Jahres 1130. (in German) Göttingen: Vandenhoeck & Ruprecht. (pp. 267–395)
