= Antipope Victor IV (1138) =

Italian priest, antipope in 1138

- Papacy began: March 1138
- Papacy ended: 29 May 1138
- Predecessor: Roman claimant: Innocent II; Antipapal claimant: Anacletus II
- Successor: Roman claimant: Innocent II; Antipapal claimant: Victor IV (1159–1164)
- Opposed to: Pope Innocent II
- Other post: Cardinal-Priest of Santi Apostoli

Personal details
- Born: Gregorio dei Conti di Ceccano Ceccano

Victor IV (died after April 1139) was antipope from March to 29 May 1138.

== Biography ==
Possibly he was born in Ceccano, as Gregorio dei Conti di Ceccano.

Pope Paschal II created him cardinal-priest of SS. XII Apostoli, at the latest in 1102. He was with the pope at Bèze on 18 February 1107.

=== Investiture controversy ===
In February 1111, King Henry V came to Rome to demand his imperial coronation. On 12 February, the ceremony took place at St. Peter's Basilica, and during the welcome at the door, the pope read out a decree, in which he repudiated lay investiture, and ordered all bishops to surrender their imperial fiefs to the emperor immediately and permanently. The king and the indignant bishops retired to discuss the shocking demand, and, as evening approached, the pope refused the coronation. After Mass, he and the cardinals were taken into custody by Henry's armed troops, and on 16 February, after a battle with the Romans in the Borgo, Henry and his captive prelates departed the city. The pope and sixteen cardinals, including Gregory of SS. XII Apostoli, were held captive for sixty-one days, while Henry pressed the pope to agree to his solution to the investiture controversy. On 18 April, at Ponte Mammolo on the Anio River, Gregory was one of the cardinals who were compelled to sign the papal promise to observe the agreement which Henry had drawn up.

In 1111, Pope Paschal delegated Cardinal Gregory to hold a synod in Veroli, to complete business which had begun in the papal court, concerning the crimes of the Archdeacon Grimaldi.

After Paschal's meeting with the emperor, criticism of him grew louder and louder, particularly from among the Gregorians, who saw the "Privilegium" as a betrayal of everything they had been doing to free the Church from the State. Paschal retreated from the scorn and the disdain to Terracina, where he was confronted on 5 July by the cardinals, led by Giovanni of Tusculum and Leo of Ostia. Paschal promised he would fix his error, but instead retreated farther, to the island of Ponza.

Pressure mounted on the pope until he was prevailed upon to summon a synod to deal with the "Privilege". The synod met on 18—23 March 1112, with more than 100 bishops in attendance. The leaders in the movement, who presented the documentary evidence to the Lateran synod, were: the papal legate in Aquitaine, Archbishop Gerard of Angoulême; the bishops Leo of Ostia and Galo of St. Pol-de-Leon; and the cardinals Robert of S. Eusebio and Gregory of SS. XII Apostolorum. It is said that they were responsible for drawing up the final statement, "Privilegium illud." The council emphatically condemned the "privilege" granted by Pope Paschal. In 1112, Paschal deposed him from his title because he had severely criticised (together with cardinal Robert of Sant'Eusebio, also subsequently deposed) Paschal's policy towards the emperor Henry V.

=== Cardinalate restored ===
In February 1119, shortly after the election of Calixtus II was announced in Rome, he and Cardinal Robert, along with numerous other schismatics, wrote to the new pope, congratulating that his election was neither simoniac nor motivated by "the tumour of ambition", and begging his pardon and absolution. Gregory and Robert both knew Archbishop Guy de Bourgogne of Vienne when he attended the Roman synod of March 1112. They may also have known of Archbishop Guy's synod, held in October 1112, in which the council called Pope Paschal a simpleton (quod rex extorsit a vestra simplicitate) and excommunicated Henry V. Calixtus restored Gregory to his cardinalate, though his earliest subscription of a papal document is dated 6 April 1123; his signature in second place seems to indicate that he was restored without loss of seniority. He continued to subscribe to papal documents until the summer before the death of Pope Calixtus on 13 December 1124.

Cardinal Gregory also regularly subscribed documents for the new pope, Honorius II (Cardinal Lamberto, Bishop of Ostia). He was at the Lateran in 1125, 1126, 1127, 1128, and 1129.

On 11 April 1126, after a year-long contest of wills, Pope Honorius II excommunicated the abbot of Montecassino, Oderisio II (1123—1126), and all the monks in his faction. When the other faction attempted to conduct an election for his successor, as they claimed was their canonical right, civil war broke out in the Montecassino community between the supporters of Oderisio and the supporters of abbot Nicola (1126—1127). In the crisis, intending to exert papal control over a monastery which was far too independent, Pope Honorius sent Cardinal Gregory of SS. XII Apostolorum to Montecassino, with orders to sort out the situation and elect the pope's candidate, Senioretto, the Provost of the monastery at Capua. This merely fired up Oderisius to hire troops and destroy the Rocca di Bantra, which was held by supporters of abbot Nicola. The election was not successfully managed by Cardinal Gregorio, and, in 1127, Honorius appointed Cardinal Conrad of S. Pudenziana to get Senioretto elected abbot, and then Cardinal Matteo, Bishop of Albano. After the surrender of Oderisio to the pope and the expulsion of Nicola for depleting the church treasury, a proper canonical election, achieved by papal intrusion, finally took place in July 1127.

=== Schism ===
In the papal election of 14 February 1130, he joined the obedience of Anacletus II (1130–1138). In February 1130, Gregory was one of the twenty-eight cardinals who wrote to King Lothair III, explaining the events surrounding the papal election of 1130, and blaming Cardinal Aimeric for having attempted to carry out a coup-d'état. On 27 March 1130, Cardinal Gregory, along with thirteen other cardinals, subscribed a bull of Pope Anacletus confirming the privileges and property of the monastery of S. Paul outside-the-walls in Rome.

After the death of Pope Anacletus on 25 January 1138, his cardinals were in some uncertainty as to how to proceed. They, therefore, took counsel, first with the family of the Pierleoni, their most important supporters among the Roman aristocracy, and then with King Roger II of Sicily, their most important political ally in Italy. Robert advised them to hold the election. It was to his advantage to have another pope to oppose Innocent and Lothair. The cardinals, therefore, assembled for the election.

Cardinal Gregory was chosen as Anacletus' successor in mid-March 1138, taking the name Victor IV. However, through the negotiation skills of Bernard of Clairvaux, over a period of eight weeks, he was induced to make his submission to Pope Innocent II on 29 May 1138. Innocent had also bribed the brothers Pierleoni to change sides. Innocent initially restored him as cardinal of SS. Apostoli, but in the Second Lateran Council in April 1139 all the former adherents of Anacletus II were condemned and deposed, despite explicit promises given by Innocent. Then Gregory retired to the priorate of S. Eusebio in Fontanella. The date of his death is not recorded. A successor in the title of SS. Apostoli, Hildebrand, appears for the first time on 4 January 1157.

== Bibliography ==
- Gregorovius, Ferdinand (1896), History of Rome in the Middle Ages. Volume IV. part 2, second edition (London: George Bell, 1896).
- Hüls, Rudolf (1977). Kardinal, Klerus und Kirchen Roms: 1049–1130, Tübingen: Max Niemeyer 1977. (in German)
- Jaffé, Philippus (1885). Regesta pontificum Romanorum ab condita Ecclesia ad annum post Christum natum MCXCVIII (in Latin). Vol. Tomus primus (second ed.). Leipzig: Veit.
- Klewitz, Hans Walter (1957). Reformpapsttum und Kardinalkolleg (in German). Darmstadt.

=== External links ===
- Falconieri, Tommaso di Carpegna (2020). "Vittore IV, antipapa." Dizionario Biografico degli Italiani Volume 99 (Trecani 2020) (in Italian)
