= Uberto Lanfranchi =

Italian Roman Catholic Archbishop and cardinal

Uberto Gian Carlo Lanfranchi (or Humbert) (died 1137) was the Cardinal-deacon of Santa Maria in Via Lata (appointed by Pope Callixtus II no later than 1123), then the Cardinal-priest of San Clemente (appointed by Honorius II in 1126), and finally the Archbishop of Pisa (appointed by Innocent II in 1132/3).

Lanfranchi was from northern Italy, either from Pisa, where he had been a regular canon, or from Bologna.

Uberto subscribed a Papal bull on 6 April 1123 when he was a cardinal-deacon and as cardinal-priest he undersigned bulls between 28 March 1126 and 2 September 1133. In 1129 Humber was sent as a Papal legate to the Kingdom of León. Upon his arrival (probably late in 1129 or in the early days of 1130) he met with Diego Gelmírez, the Archbishop of Santiago de Compostela and an important intermediary between the Papacy and king Alfonso VII, for eight days. Afterwards, he travelled into Portugal before returning to Carrión, where he presided over an important synod in February. Uberto, Diego, Oleguer Bonestruga, and the king met privately on the eve of the council to determine the agendum. The council opened on 4 February and closed on the 7th, but a copy its full acta (decrees) has not survived. Three bishops—Pelagius of Oviedo, Diego of León, and Muño of Salamanca—and the abbot of Samos were deposed by the council for having opposed the marriage of Alfonso to Berenguela of Barcelona on grounds of consanguinity. The main source for Uberto's legation to Spain is the Historia Compostellana, which gives him a deferential tone when speaking with Diego. A letter from Humber to Diego dated 1131 is friendly.

The date of Uberto's election to the archdiocese of Pisa falls between 13 December 1132 and 21 February 1133. He received episcopal consecration in September 1133 and probably resigned his cardinal's title then. During the papal schism caused by the election of Antipope Anacletus II (1130–38), Uberto remained faithful to Innocent II. In 1135, Uberto established Porto Torres as the perpetual seat of the Papal legation in Sardinia.

== See also ==
- Roman Catholic Archdiocese of Pisa

== Bibliography ==
- Klaus Ganzer. Die Entwicklung des auswärtigen Kardinalats in hohen Mittelalter. Tübingen: 1963.
- Johannes M. Brixius. Die Mitglieder des Kardinalkollegiums von 1130–1181. Berlin: 1912.

Catholic Church titles
Preceded by Roger I	Archbishop of Pisa; 1132/33 – 1137	Succeeded by Baldwin
