= Oderisio di Sangro =

Oderisio di Sangro (died on 30 August of an uncertain year, probably 1137) was an Italian Benedictine monk and cardinal, the son of Count Rinaldo of the family of the conti di Sangro in the Marsi.

He joined the order of St. Benedict at the abbey of Montecassino at a young age. He was named provost (praepositus) of the abbey by Abbot Girardus (1111–1123). In 1123, he was elected abbot, but in 1126, he was deposed and excommunicated by Pope Honorius II.

== Cardinal ==
Oderisius and his fellow monk Roscemann were named cardinal-deacons by Pope Paschalis II, in 1111 or 1112. The exact date is unknown, but his coeval Roscemann was present at the Lateran council of 18—23 March 1112. Oderisius was named cardinal-deacon of S. Agata. His name appears in October 1113 as a subscriber to an agreement between Bishop Robert of Aversa and Abbot Girardus of Montecassino concerning some property belonging to the cloister of S. Agata, which belonged to the abbey of Montecassino; he signed himself, "Oderisius diaconus et praepositus".

Pope Paschal died in Rome in the Castel S. Angelo on 21 January 1118. Cardinal Oderisius took part in the Papal election of Gelasius II, which took place in the walled monastic compound, the Palladium (S. Maria in Pallara), S. Maria in Pallara belonged to the Benedictine Congregation of Montecassino, and was the residence of Cardinal Giovanni of Gaeta (Joannes Gaetanus), the papal chancellor, who was also a Benedictine monk. Cardinal Giovanni Gaetani was elected pope on 24 January 1118.

This election provoked unrest in Rome, and the papal court was forced to flee the troops of the Emperor Henry V on 2 March. Oderisius is not one of the cardinals who subscribed documents for Pope Gelasius while he was staying in Pisa (September—October 1118), nor was he one of the cardinals who subscribed documents for Gelasius in France (23 October 1118 to 29 January 1119). He was not one of the cardinals who signed the "Act of Confirmation" of the election of Pope Calixtus II in the first week of February 1119. There are no subscriptions by Cardinal Oderisius to Pope Calixtus' documents, as far as the surviving record shows.

== Abbot of Montecassino ==
In January 1123, Oderisius was elected abbot of Montecassino (Abbot Oderisius II). Shortly after the confirmation of the election by the pope was received, he set out for Rome for his consecration as abbot. He was therefore present for the general council which met at the Lateran from 27 March to 30 March 1123. In June 1123, Oderisius, cardinal and abbot, received the oath of fealty of Prince Jordanus of Capua. In 1126, before 4 April, he was deposed as abbot due to personal conflict with Pope Honorius II (1124–30). Honorius had repeatedly summoned him to appear before him, and after a warning, and a period set for compliance, which Oderisius ignored, the Pope carried out his deposition. Even so, Oderisius continued to ignore the papal action, and continued to carry out the ceremonial functions of the abbot. On Easter Sunday, therefore, Honorius II excommunicated Oderisius and all his followers. When the other faction attempted to conduct an election for his successor, as they claimed was their canonical right, civil war broke out in the Montecassino community between the supporters of Oderisio and the supporters of abbot Nicola (1126–1127). In the crisis, intending to exert papal control over a monastery which was far too independent, Pope Honorius sent Cardinal Gregory of SS. XII Apostolorum to Montecassino, with orders to sort out the situation and have elected the pope's candidate, Senioretto, the Provost of the monastery at Capua. This merely fired up Oderisius to hire troops and destroy the Rocca di Bantra, which was held by supporters of abbot Nicola. The election was not successfully managed by Cardinal Gregorio, and, in 1127, Honorius appointed Cardinal Conrad of S. Prassede to get Senioretto elected abbot, and then Cardinal Matteo, Bishop of Albano. After the surrender of Oderisio to the pope and the expulsion of Nicola for depleting the church treasury, a proper canonical election, achieved by papal intrusion, finally took place in July 1127.

Pope Honorius II died on 13 February 1130, he was buried immediately in the cloister of the Monastery of S. Gregorio Magno in Clivo Scauri (to which the church of S. Andrew was attached). Within hours, Cardinal Aymeric organized an uncanonical election, which chose Cardinal Gregory Papareschi, the archdeacon, as Innocent II. He never obtained the majority votes of the cardinals, or the Roman clergy or of the Roman magistrates, or the Roman people. Mid-morning on 14 February, the prior episcoporum, Cardinal Petrus of Porto, summoned an emergency meeting of the cardinals, clergy, magistrates, and laity of Rome at S. Marco. The election of Innocent was condemned, and, on the nomination of Cardinal Petrus, the assembly elected Cardinal Petrus Petri Leonis, who chose the name Anacletus II . After the double papal election of 1130, Oderisius joined the obedience of Anacletus II. He subscribed a bull for Anacletus issued on 8 February, of an uncertain year (1135–37). From late 1134 to early 1137, Pope Anacletus was at Benevento, and there, on 10 March, of an uncertain year (1135–37), Cardinal Oderisius of S. Agatha subscribed a bull with him.

== Bibliography ==
- Bloch, Herbert (1986). Monte Cassino in the Middle Ages Volume II (Roma: Edizione di storia e letteratura 1986).
- Ganzer, Klaus (1963). Die Entwicklung des auswärtigen Kardinaläts im hohen Mittelalter. Tübingen: Max Niemeyer 1963. (in German)
- Gregorovius, Ferdinand (1896), History of Rome in the Middle Ages. Volume IV. part 2, second edition (London: George Bell, 1896).
- Hüls, Rudolf (1977). Kardinäle, Klerus und Kirchen Roms: 1049-1130. Tübingen: Max Niemeyer 1977. (in German)
- Jaffé, Philippus (1885). Regesta pontificum Romanorum ab condita Ecclesia ad annum post Christum natum MCXCVIII (in Latin). Vol. Tomus primus (second ed.). Leipzig: Veit.
- Klewitz, H. W. (1957). Reformpapsttum und Kardinalkolleg, Darmstadt 1957. (in German)
- Watterich, J. B. M. (1862). Pontificum Romanorum qui fuerunt inde ab exeunte saeculo IX usque ad finem saeculi XIII vitae: ab aequalibus conscriptae (in Latin). Vol. Tom. II. Leipzig: G. Engelmann.
