= Pope-elect Stephen =

Roman priest (died 752)

- Bishop-elect of Rome
- Native name: Stephanus
- Church: Catholic Church
- Province: Rome
- Diocese: Rome
- See: Holy See (elect)
- Elected: 23 March 752
- In office: 23 March 752 – 26 March 752
- Predecessor: Zachary
- Successor: Stephen II (as Pope); Celestine II (as Pope-elect)
- Previous post: Cardinal-priest of San Crisogono (745–752)

Orders
- Created cardinal: 745 by Zachary

Personal details
- Born: 7th century Rome, Exarchate of Ravenna
- Died: 26 March 752 Apostolic Palace of the Lateran, Rome, Duchy of Rome
- Buried: Old St. Peter's Basilica, Rome
- Denomination: Catholicism
- Residence: Apostolic Palace of the Lateran (as Pope-elect)
- Occupation: Cardinal-priest
- Profession: Presbyter

Pope-elect Stephen (Latin: Stephanus; 7th century — 26 March 752), before 1961 previously known as Pope Stephen II, was a Roman cardinal-priest and presbyter selected on 23 March 752 to succeed Pope Zachary. Because he died before his episcopal consecration, Stephen is merely considered a pope-elect rather than a legitimate pope.

He is one of two "popes-elect" of the Catholic Church, the other being Pope-elect Celestine II. (Note: Cardinal Teobaldo Boccapecci was elected Pope in 1124, taking the name Celestine II; however, he resigned before his consecration due to political infighting and to prevent a schism. He is often acknowledged as "Pope-elect Celestine II".)

== Life ==
Although not much is known surrounding his life, Stephen was born in Rome (then part of the Exarchate of Ravenna) in the Byzantine Empire during either the seventh or eighth century. He was baptised into the state religion of Christianity; later in life, he was ordained as a priest in the Diocese of Rome, serving as a presbyter.

In 745, Stephen was made a cardinal-priest by Pope Zachary, one of the twenty-two cardinals he created. His titular church was San Crisogono, where he would serve until 752.

=== Election to the Papacy and death ===
Zachary died on 15 March 752. Following his funeral, on 23 March, Stephen was unanimously selected to become the new pope, settling into the Apostolic Palace of the Lateran in Rome (at that time within the Kingdom of the Lombards). However, he reportedly felt unwell a day later. He was not legally bishop of Rome, owing to the canon law of the time, which stated that a pope's pontificate started upon his consecration.

While ordering household chores from family members, Stephen suffered a stroke on 25 March. He succumbed to its effects the following day, still at the Lateran Palace, on 26 March; thus, Stephen died before his official consecration as bishop of Rome and coronation. He was succeeded by Stephen II the next day, who reigned until 757. Stephen II is legally acknowledged as Zachary's rightful successor by the Catholic Church.

Following his own funeral, Stephen was buried in the atrium of the Old St. Peter's Basilica; however, his tomb was destroyed and subsequently lost during its demolition.

=== Legacy ===
Due to his extraordinarily brief tenure (which did not even legally begin), Stephen did not personally have any palpable impact on the Catholic Church. If he is counted a pope, then he carries the shortest term of any pope in history.

Later canon law considered that a man became pope the moment he accepted his election, and Pope-elect Stephen was then anachronistically called Pope Stephen II. The pope currently acknowledged as Pope Stephen II was, in turn, called Pope Stephen III, with all subsequent popes by this name ascending in number.

His name was removed from the list of popes in the Annuario Pontificio in 1961. He was originally included in the Annuario from the sixteenth century onwards. Despite the Catholic Church omitting him from this list, he is often acknowledged by modern historians as a pope.

== See also ==
- Ten shortest-reigning popes
- Pope John XX
