= Pope-elect Celestine II =

Italian cardinal, pope-elect 1124

- Bishop-elect of Rome
- Elected: 16 December 1124
- Quashed: 17 December 1124
- Predecessor: Roman claimant: (as Pope) Callixtus II; (as Pope-elect) Stephen; Antipapal claimant: Gregory VIII
- Successor: Roman claimant: Honorius II; Antipapal claimant: Anacletus II
- Other posts: Cardinal Priest of Sant'Anastasia al Palatino; Cardinal Deacon of Santa Maria Nova

Personal details
- Born: Teobaldo Boccapecci Rome, Papal States

Teobaldo Boccapecci or Boccapeconai (Latin: Thebaldus Buccapecus) was elected pope after the death of Pope Callixtus II on 13 December 1124 and took the name Celestine II, but factional violence broke out during his investiture. This resulted in his resignation before his consecration or enthronement in order to avoid schism.

He is one of two men considered to be "Popes-elect"; the former, and more famous of them, is Pope-elect Stephen ("Stephen II").

== Life ==
Boccapecci was a native of Rome. Around 1103 Paschal II made him Cardinal Deacon of Santa Maria Nova. At the consistory of 1122, Callixtus named him Cardinal Priest of Sant'Anastasia al Palatino.

"The history of the papacy in the early Middle Ages was marked by constantly contested papal elections wherein the various claimants were often proxies for struggles between factions of the nobility". The pontificates of Urban II and Paschal II saw an increase in the College of Cardinals of Italian clerics that strengthened the local Roman influence. These cardinals viewed the French and Burgundian cardinals appointed by Callixtus II as dangerous innovators, and they were determined to resist their increasing influence. The northern cardinals, led by Cardinal Aymeric de Bourgogne (the Papal Chancellor), were equally determined to ensure that the elected pope would be one of their candidates. Both groups looked towards the great Roman families for support.

At the time of the death of Callixtus on 13 December 1124, the city of Rome was divided between the Frangipani, who supported the German Holy Roman Emperor, and the Pierleoni, who led the Roman nobility. Each faction promoted their own candidate for pope.

The conclave was held three days later on 16 December. The Cardinals assembled, under the protection of the Pierleoni, in the chapel of the monastery of S. Pancrazio al Laterano attached to the south of the Lateran basilica. Initially, most of the cardinals held for Cardinal Saxo de Anagni (Sasso), Cardinal-Priest of San Stefano in Celiomonte, who was backed by the Pierleoni family. However, support shifted to Cardinal Boccapecci at the suggestion of Jonathas, the cardinal-deacon of Santi Cosma e Damiano, a Pierleoni partisan. Boccapecci was then elected, and chose the name Celestine II.

Boccapecci had only just been proclaimed pope, the investiture ceremony started and the singing of the Te Deum begun, when Roberto Frangipani and a body of armed men broke into the church. Leo Frangipani and the papal chancellor Cardinal Aymeric de Bourgogne proclaimed the Bishop of Ostia, Cardinal Lamberto Scannabecchi, a man of considerable learning, pope. During the ensuing melee, Cardinal Boccapecci was wounded. Since he had not yet been formally consecrated pope, Boccapecci declared himself willing to resign, which he formally did the next day in order to avoid a schism. The Pierleoni were paid a substantial bribe to concede. Cardinal Scannabecchi was unwilling to accept the throne in such a manner, and he too resigned his position before all of the assembled Cardinals, but was immediately and unanimously re-elected and consecrated on 21 December 1124 under the name Honorius II.

Boccapecci, already an elderly man, is not mentioned in the sources after those events. Several historians assume he has died shortly thereafter due to the violent treatment he had received, others reject this as pure speculation. He was succeeded as Cardinal Priest of Sant'Anastasia al Palatino by a priest named Pierre in December 1126, which strongly suggests he had died by that time.

According to historian Salvador Miranda, as Boccapecci was duly elected, he should not be considered an antipope; however, as he resigned before being consecrated and enthroned, neither is he counted among the popes.
