= Matthew of Albano =

French Benedictine monk, saint and Cardinal

Matthew of Albano (Matthieu, O.S.B.Clun.) (died 1134) was a French Benedictine monk and Cardinal, and papal legate. He is a Catholic saint.

He was instrumental in the recognition of the Knights Templar, at the 1129 Council of Troyes.

He was a nephew of Hugh de Boves, abbot of Reading, bishop of Amiens and then archbishop of Rouen. They were both from a noble background, near Laon.
