= Pope Honorius II =

Head of the Catholic Church from 1124 to 1130

- Bishop of Rome
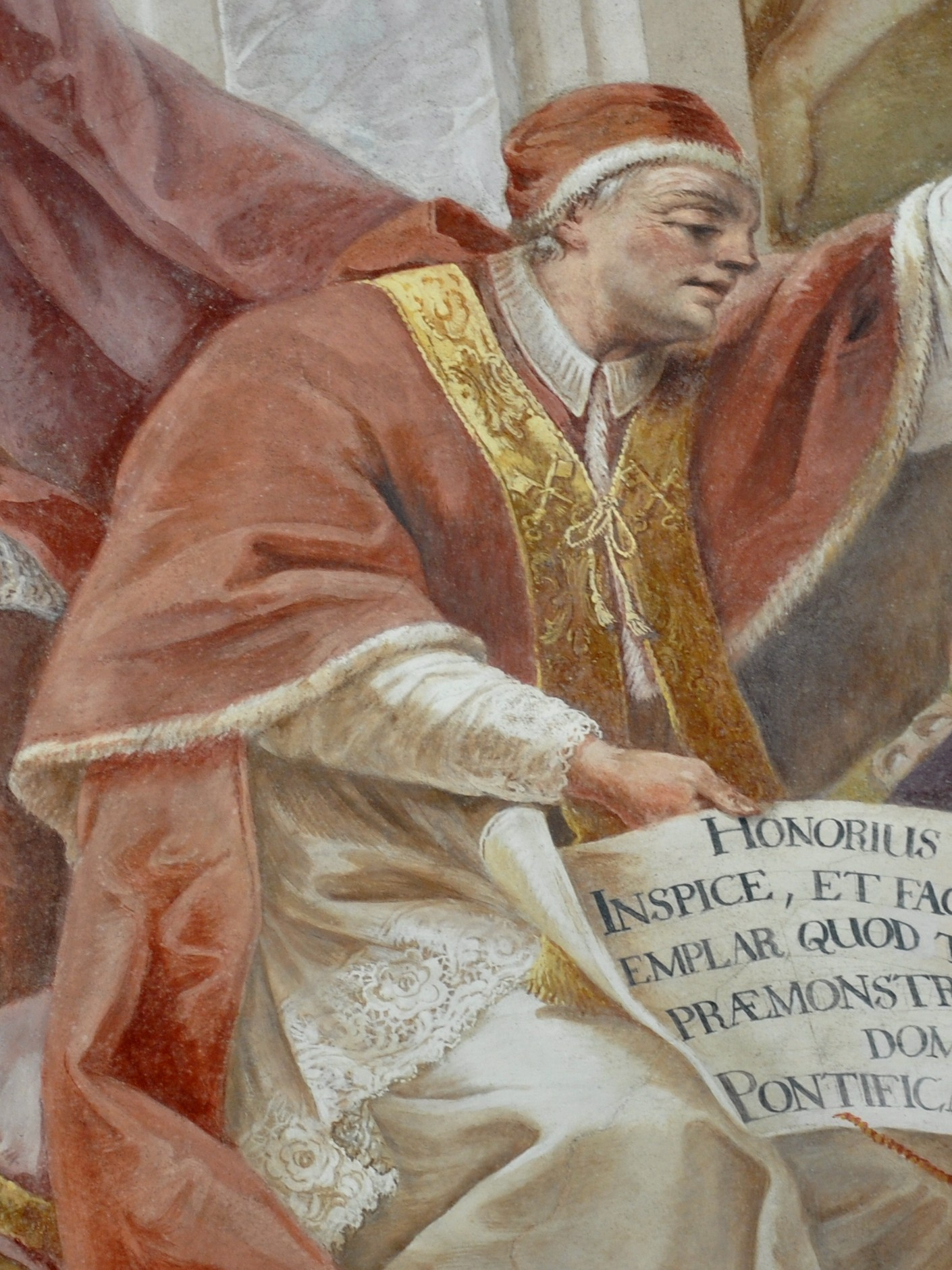
- Honorius II depicted in a fresco at the Schussenried Abbey
- Church: Catholic Church
- Papacy began: 21 December 1124
- Papacy ended: 13 February 1130
- Predecessor: Callixtus II
- Successor: Innocent II
- Previous posts: Cardinal-Priest of Santa Prassede (1099–1117); Bishop of Ostia (1117–1124)

Orders
- Consecration: 1117
- Created cardinal: 1099 by Urban II
- Rank: Cardinal Priest (1099–1118) Cardinal Bishop (1118–1124)

Personal details
- Born: Lamberto Scannabecchi; 9 February 1060 Fiagnano, Papal States, Holy Roman Empire
- Died: 13 February 1130 (aged 70) Rome, Papal States, Holy Roman Empire

Pope Honorius II (9 February 1060 – 13 February 1130), born Lamberto Scannabecchi, was head of the Catholic Church and ruler of the Papal States from 21 December 1124 to his death in 1130.

Although from a humble background, his obvious intellect and outstanding abilities saw him promoted up through the ecclesiastical hierarchy. Attached to the Frangipani family of Rome, his election as pope was contested by a rival candidate, Celestine II, and force was used to guarantee his election.

Honorius's pontificate was concerned with ensuring that the privileges the Roman Catholic Church had obtained through the Concordat of Worms were preserved and, if possible, extended. He was the first pope to confirm the election of the Holy Roman emperor. Distrustful of the traditional Benedictine order, he favoured new monastic orders, such as the Augustinians and the Cistercians, and sought to exercise more control over the larger monastic centres of Monte Cassino and Cluny Abbey. He also approved the new military order of the Knights Templar in 1128.

Honorius II failed to prevent Roger II of Sicily from extending his power in southern Italy and was unable to stop Louis VI of France from interfering in the affairs of the French church. Like his predecessors, he managed the wide-ranging affairs of the church through Papal Legates. With his death in 1130, the Church was again thrown into confusion with the election of two rival popes, Innocent II and the antipope Anacletus II.

== Early life ==
Lamberto was of simple rural origins, hailing from Fiagnano in the Casalfiumanese commune, near Imola in present-day Italy. Entering into an ecclesiastical career, he soon became archdeacon of Bologna, where his abilities eventually saw him attract the attention of Pope Urban II, who presumably appointed him cardinal priest of an unknown church, in c. 1099, though S. Prassede has been discussed. His successor, Pope Paschal II, made Lamberto a Canon of the Lateran before elevating him to the position of cardinal bishop of Ostia in 1117. Lamberto was one of the cardinals who accompanied Pope Gelasius II into exile in 1118–19 and was at his bedside when Gelasius died.

With Gelasius's death at Cluny on 28 January 1119, Cardinal Lamberto and Cardinal Cono (Bishop of Palestrina) conducted the election of a new pope according to the canons. Cardinal Lamberto carried out the coronation of Guy de Bourgogne at Vienne on 9 February 1119, and became a close advisor of Pope Callixtus II. Accompanying Callixtus throughout France, he assisted Callixtus in his initial dealings with Holy Roman Emperor Henry V. As a well-known opponent of the emperor's right to select bishops in his territories (the Investiture Controversy), Lamberto was a natural choice for papal legate. He was sent in 1119 to deal with Henry V and delegated with powers to come to an understanding concerning the right of investiture.

Forceful and determined, Lamberto summoned the bishops of the Holy Roman Empire to attend an assembly at Mainz on 8 September 1122. He expected absolute obedience, so much so that it took the mediation of Archbishop Adalbert of Mainz to prevent the suspension of Saint Otto of Bamberg for non-attendance. The struggle came to a conclusion with the Concordat of Worms in 1122 and the "Pactum Calixtinum", almost entirely due to Lamberto's efforts, was effected on 23 September 1123.

== Pontificate ==
=== Conclave of 1124 ===
Pressures building within the Curia, together with ongoing conflicts among the Roman nobility, would erupt after the death of Callixtus II in 1124. The pontificates of Urban II and Paschal II saw an expansion in the College of Cardinals of Italian clerics that strengthened the local Roman influence. These cardinals were reluctant to meet with the batch of cardinals recently promoted by Callixtus II, who were mainly French or Burgundian. As far as the older cardinals were concerned, these newer cardinals were dangerous innovators, and they were determined to resist their increasing influence. The northern cardinals, led by Cardinal Aymeric de Bourgogne (the Papal Chancellor), were equally determined to ensure that the elected pope would be one of their candidates. Both groups looked towards the great Roman families for support.

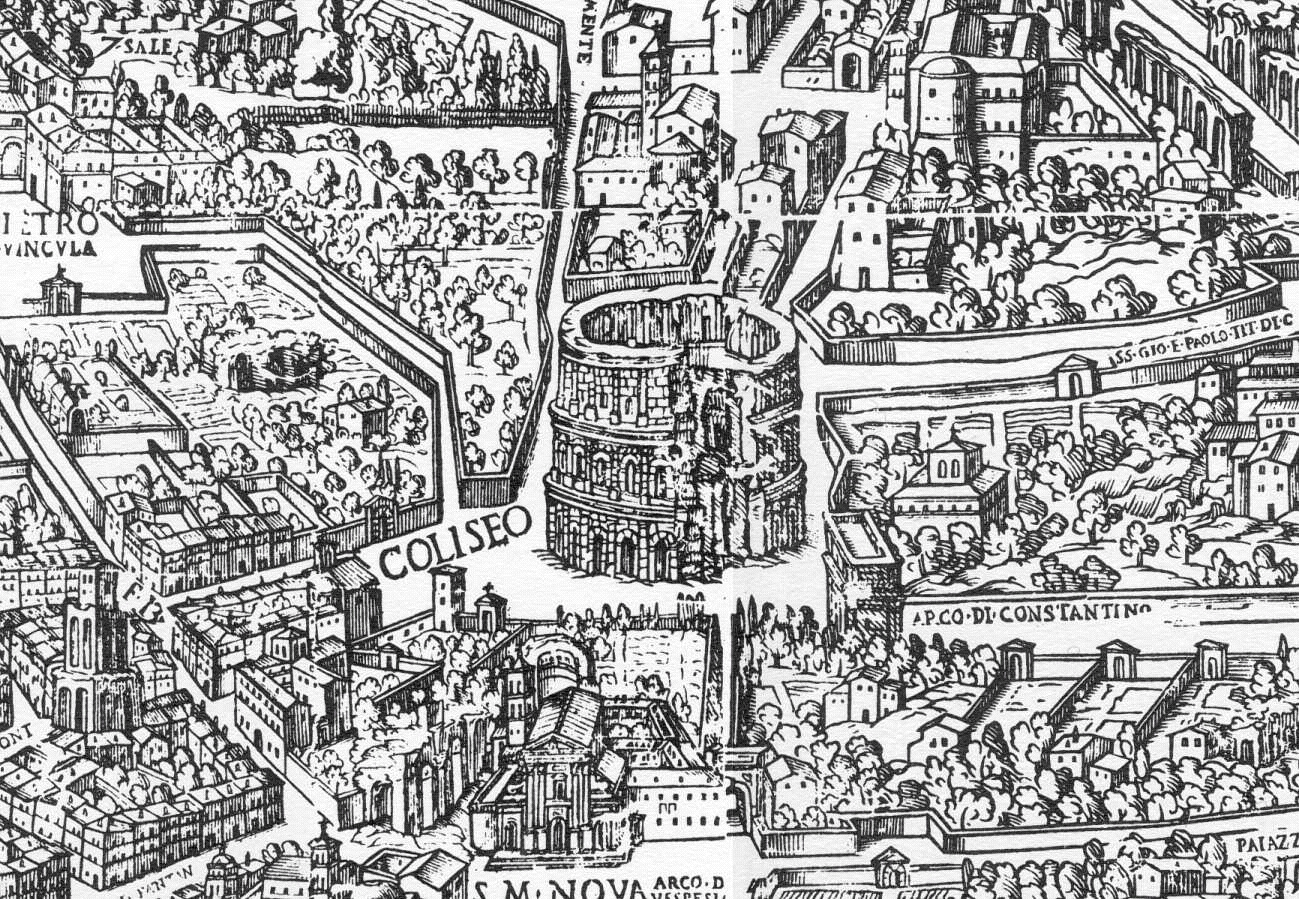
The area of medieval Rome controlled by the Frangipani family

By 1124, there were two great factions dominating local politics in Rome: the Frangipani family, which controlled the region around the fortified Colosseum and supported the northern cardinals, and the Pierleoni family, which controlled the Tiber Island and the fortress of the Theatre of Marcellus and supported the Italian cardinals. With Callixtus II's death on 13 December 1124, both families agreed that the election of the next pope should be in three days time, in accordance with the church canons. The Frangipani, led by Leo Frangipani, pushed for the delay in order that they could promote their preferred candidate, Lamberto, but the people were eager to see Saxo de Anagni, the Cardinal-Priest of San Stefano in Celiomonte elected as the next pope. Leo, eager to ensure a valid election, approached key members of every cardinal's entourage, promising each one that he would support their master when the voting for the election was underway.

On 16 December, all the cardinals, including Lamberto, assembled in the chapel of the monastery of St. Pancratius attached to the south of the Lateran basilica. There, at the suggestion of Jonathas, the cardinal-deacon of Santi Cosma e Damiano, who was a partisan of the Pierleoni family, the cardinals unanimously elected as Pope the Cardinal-Priest of Sant'Anastasia, Theobaldo Boccapecci, who took the name Celestine II. He had only just put on the red mantle and the Te Deum was being sung when an armed party of Frangipani supporters (in a move pre-arranged with Cardinal Aymeric) burst in, attacked the newly enthroned Celestine, who was wounded, and acclaimed Lamberto as Pope. Since Celestine had not been formally consecrated pope, the wounded candidate declared himself willing to resign, but the Pierleoni family and their supporters refused to accept Lamberto, who in the confusion had been proclaimed Pope under the name Honorius II.

Rome descended into factional infighting, while Cardinal Aymeric and Leo Frangipani attempted to win over the resistance of Urban, the City Prefect, and the Pierleoni family with bribes and extravagant promises. Eventually, Celestine's supporters abandoned him, leaving Honorius the only contender for the papal throne. Honorius, unwilling to accept the throne in such a manner, resigned his position before all of the assembled cardinals, but was immediately and unanimously re-elected and consecrated on 21 December 1124.

== Papacy ==
=== Relations with the Holy Roman Empire ===
Honorius immediately came into conflict with Emperor Henry V over imperial claims in Italy. In 1116, Henry had crossed the Alps to lay claim to the Italian territories of Matilda of Tuscany, which she had supposedly left to the papacy on her death. Henry had immediately begun appointing imperial vicars throughout the newly acquired province over the objections of both the Tuscan cities and the papacy. To maintain papal claims to Tuscany, Honorius appointed Albert, a papal marquis, to rule in the pope's name in opposition to the imperial Margrave of Tuscany, Conrad von Scheiern. In addition, Henry V made very little effort to implement the terms of the Concordant of Worms, to Honorius II's irritation. Local churches were forced to appeal to Rome to obtain restitution from the imperial bishops who had taken advantage of the Investiture Controversy to obtain property for their own benefit, as the Emperor turned a blind eye.

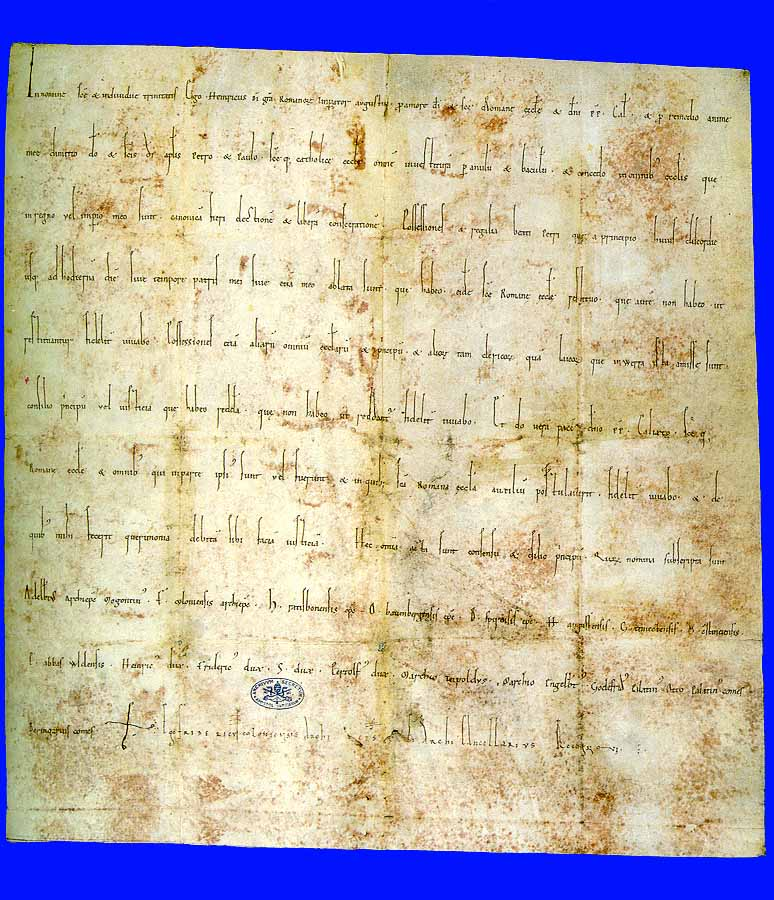
The Concordat of Worms, which Honorius II helped to draft and which Emperor Lothair III was forced to comply with for Papal support

The death of Emperor Henry V on 23 May 1125 put an end to these squabbles, but soon Honorius was involved in a new power struggle in the Holy Roman Empire. Henry died childless and had nominated his nephew Frederick Hohenstaufen, Duke of Swabia, to succeed him as King of the Romans and Holy Roman Emperor. Of the German princes, the ecclesiastical faction was against any expansion of Hohenstaufen power, and they were determined to ensure that Frederick would not succeed Henry. Led by Archbishop Adalbert of Mainz, the archchancellor of the empire, and under the watchful gaze of two papal legates, Cardinals Gherardo and Romano, the clerical and lay nobles of the empire elected Lothair of Supplinburg, Duke of Saxony. At Lothair's request, Cardinal Gherardo and two bishops then sent word to Rome to obtain Honorius's confirmation of the election, which he granted. This was a coup for Honorius, as such a confirmation had never occurred before, and around July 1126 Honorius invited Lothair to Rome to obtain the imperial title. Lothair was keen to keep Honorius on his side, keeping to the terms of the Concordat of Worms by not attending episcopal elections, agreeing that the investiture should only occur after the bishop's consecration, and that the oath of homage be replaced with an oath of fidelity.

Lothair was unable to visit Rome immediately as Germany was rocked by the rebellion of the Hohenstaufen brothers, with Conrad Hohenstaufen elected anti-king in December 1127, followed by his descent into Italy and his crowning as King of Italy at Monza on 29 July 1128. The German bishops, again led by Adalbert of Mainz, excommunicated Conrad, an act that was confirmed by Honorius in a synod held in Rome at Easter (22 April 1128). Honorius also sent Cardinal John of Crema to Pisa to hold another synod that excommunicated Archbishop Anselm of Milan, who had crowned Conrad king. Conrad found little help in Italy and with Honorius's support, Lothair was able to keep his throne.

One of the key ecclesiastical advisors of Lothair III was Saint Norbert of Xanten, who travelled to Rome in early 1126 to seek the formal sanction from Honorius to establish a new monastic order, the Premonstratensian Order (also known as the Norbertines), which Honorius agreed to do.

=== Concerns in Campania ===
One of Honorius's first tasks in southern Italy was to deal with the barons in the Campania who were molesting farmers and travellers at will with their armed bands. In 1125, papal force brought to heel the lords of Ceccano. Papal armies took possession of various towns, including Maenza, Roccasecca and Trevi nel Lazio. In 1128, Honorius's forces successfully captured the town of Segni, which was also held by a local baron who died during its capture. Honorius, however, was most concerned about the former papal stronghold at Fumone, which the nobles, who held it in the pope's name, had decided to keep possession of. The town fell in July 1125, after a siege of ten weeks. When Honorius took possession of Fumone, he returned it, after taking safeguards, to its rebellious custodians and ordered that the Antipope Gregory VIII be transferred there from his previous lodgings at Monte Cassino. With that, Honorius turned his attention to the powerful and independent-minded abbot of Monte Cassino, Oderisio di Sangro.

Honorius had a long-standing dislike of Oderisio going back to the time when Honorius was cardinal-bishop of Ostia. Honorius had asked for permission from the abbot to allow him and his entourage permission to stay in the church of Santa Maria in Pallara, which was a traditional privilege belonging to the bishops of Ostia. Oderisio refused, and Honorius never forgot the insult. These bad feelings were compounded in 1125, when Oderisio refused a request from Pope Honorius for some financial assistance after he had been enthroned. Oderisio also mocked Honorius's peasant background behind his back.

Using reports that the abbot had been lining his own pockets rather than spending it on his monastery, Honorius publicly denounced Oderisio, calling him a soldier and a thief, not a monk. When Atenulf, count of Aquino, brought accusations that Oderisio was aiming for the papacy, Honorius summoned Oderisio to Rome to answer the charges. Three times Oderisio refused to answer the summons and so during Lent of 1126, Honorius deposed the abbot. Oderisio refused to accept the deposition and continued to act as abbot, forcing Honorius to excommunicate him. Oderisio fortified the monastery, as the people of the town of Cassino forcibly entered the monastery, and after an armed struggle forced the monks to declare Oderisio deposed and to elect another abbot in his place. The monks elected Niccolo, the dean of the monastery.

Determined to bring the Benedictines to heel, Honorius insisted that the election of Niccolo was uncanonical, and demanded that Seniorectus, the provost of the monastery at Capua, be elected as abbot, to the fury of the Monte Cassino monks. In the meantime, open warfare was being waged between the supporters of Oderisio and Niccolo. Eventually, however, Honorius was able to secure not only the resignation of Oderisio, but he also excommunicated Niccolo for good measure. He reassured the monks of his intentions, and in September 1127, he personally installed Seniorectus as abbot. Honorius also insisted that the monks take an oath of fidelity to the papacy, but they strenuously objected.

=== Conflict with Roger II of Sicily ===
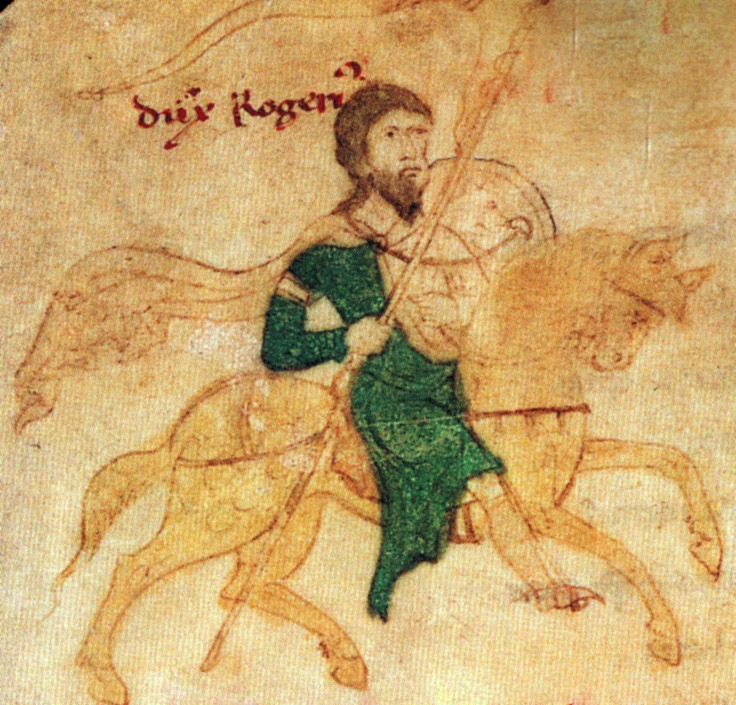
Roger II of Sicily who forced Pope Honorius II to grant him the Duchy of Apulia

Matters to the south of Monte Cassino soon occupied Honorius's attention. In July 1127, William II, Duke of Apulia, died childless, and almost immediately his cousin King Roger II of Sicily sailed to the mainland to occupy the duchies of Apulia and Calabria. Roger claimed that William had nominated him his heir, while Honorius stated that William had left his territory to the Holy See. Honorius had just suffered a defeat at the hands of a local baron at Arpino in 1127 when Honorius received word that Roger had landed in Italy. He rushed to Benevento to prevent the local Normans from reaching an agreement with Roger. Roger in the meantime had rapidly overrun the duchy of Apulia and had sent Honorius lavish gifts, asking the Pope to recognise him as the new duke and promising to hand over Troia and Montefusco in exchange. Honorius, fearing the expansion of Norman power to the south under one dominating ruler, threatened to excommunicate Roger if he persisted. In the meantime, many of the local Norman nobles, fearful of Roger's power, allied themselves with Honorius, as Honorius formally excommunicated Roger in November 1127. Roger left his armies threatening Benevento, while he returned to Sicily for reinforcements. Honorius in the meantime entered into an alliance with the new Prince of Capua, Robert II. On 30 December 1127, Honorius preached a crusade against Roger II after having anointed Robert as Prince of Capua.

Roger returned in May 1128 and continued to harass papal strongholds while avoiding any direct confrontation with Honorius's forces. In July 1128, the two armies came in contact with each other on the banks of the Bradano, but Roger refused to engage, believing that the papal armies would soon fall apart, and soon enough some of the Pope's allies began deserting to Roger. Trying to salvage something of the situation, Honorius sent his trusted advisor Cardinal Aymeric together with Cencio II Frangipane to negotiate with Roger secretly. Honorius agreed to invest Roger with the duchy of Apulia in exchange for an oath of faith and homage by Roger.

Honorius travelled to Benevento, and after safeguarding the interests of Robert of Capua, he met Roger on the Pons Major, the bridge which crosses the Sabbato river near Benevento, on 22 August 1128. There, he formally invested Roger with the duchy of Apulia and both agreed to a peace between the Kingdom of Sicily and the Papal States. Unfortunately, Honorius had just returned to Rome when he was informed that the nobles of Benevento had overthrown and killed the rector (or papal governor) of the city and established a Commune. Furious, he declared he would wreak a terrible vengeance on the city, whereupon the residents asked Honorius for forgiveness and to send another governor. Honorius sent Cardinal Gherardo as the new rector, and in 1129 visited the city again, asking that the city allow the return of those they had banished during the formation of the Commune. They refused, and Honorius asked Roger II of Sicily to punish the city in May 1130, but Honorius died before action was taken.

=== Intervention in France ===
Aside from the Benedictines at Monte Cassino, Honorius was also determined to deal with the monks at Cluny Abbey under their ambitious and worldly abbot, Pons of Melgueil. He had just returned from the Levant after being forced out by his monks in 1122. In 1125, accompanied by an armed following, Pons took possession of Cluny Abbey, melted down the treasures stored in the monastery, and paid his followers, who continued to terrorise the monks and the villages dependent upon the abbey.

Honorius, on hearing news of the disorders at Cluny, sent a legate to investigate with orders to excommunicate and denounce Pons and order him to present himself before Honorius. Pons eventually obeyed the summons, and was deposed by Honorius in 1126 before being imprisoned in the Septizodium, where he soon died. Honorius personally reinvested Peter the Venerable as Abbot of Cluny.

Honorius soon became involved in the quarrel between King Louis VI of France and the French bishops. Stephen of Senlis, the Bishop of Paris, had been heavily influenced by the reforming zeal of Bernard of Clairvaux, and actively sought to remove royal influence in the French church. Louis confiscated Stephen's wealth and began harassing him so that he would cease his reforming activities. At the same time, Louis also had in his sights Henri Sanglier, the Archbishop of Sens, who had also joined the reformers. Charging Henri with simony, Louis attempted to remove another threat from within the French church. Bernard of Clairvaux wrote to Honorius asking him to intervene on behalf of both men and support church independence over the claims of royal jurisdiction and interference.

Royal pressure was also brought to bear on Hildebert of Lavardin, whom Honorius had transferred from the see of Le Mans to become the Archbishop of Tours in 1125. In 1126, Louis insisted on filling episcopal vacancies in the See of Tours with his own candidates over Hildebert's objections. Hildebert also complained to Honorius about the constant appeals to Rome whenever he made a ruling.

In response to the king's actions, the French bishops laid an interdict on the diocese of Paris, causing Louis to write to Honorius, who suspended the interdict in 1129. Although this incurred the wrath of Bernard of Clairvaux, who wrote to Honorius expressing his disgust, Honorius pressured Stephen of Senlis to become reconciled with King Louis in 1130. Henri Sanglier, on the other hand, continued in his role of archbishop without further interference from the king. By the end of his pontificate, Honorius had ended the conflict between Louis and his bishops.

In 1127, Honorius confirmed the acts of the Synod of Nantes, presided over by Archbishop Hildebert of Lavardin, which eradicated certain local abuses in Brittany. That same year, Honorius helped Conan III, Duke of Brittany, bring one of his rebellious vassals to heel. He also intervened on behalf of the monks of the Lérins Islands who were constantly harassed by Arab pirates, encouraging a crusade to help defend the monks.

Honorius was also called to intervene in the affairs of Normandy, as Fulk of Anjou and King Henry I of England battled for domination. Henry objected to the marriage of Fulk's daughter Sibylla of Anjou to William Clito, the son of the duke of Normandy, on the grounds that they were too closely related by blood, being sixth cousins. They refused to divorce, and Honorius was forced to excommunicate Fulk and his son-in-law and to impose an interdict upon their territories.

=== Relations with England and Spain ===
In England, the ongoing dispute between the Sees of Canterbury and York over primacy continued unabated. On 5 April 1125, Honorius wrote to Thurstan, Archbishop of York, advising him that Honorius planned to settle the issue personally. He sent a legate, Cardinal John of Crema, to deal with the question of primacy, as well as other jurisdictional issues between Canterbury and Wales, and between York, Scotland and Norway. Honorius wrote to the clergy and nobles of England, directing them to treat his legate as if he were Honorius himself.

In Honorius's name, John of Crema convened the Synod of Roxburgh in 1125. In a letter written to King David I of Scotland, the king was asked to send the bishops of Scotland to the council, which discussed the claims of the Archbishop of York to have jurisdiction over the church in Scotland. Upholding the claims of York, Honorius was unsuccessful in forcing the Scottish bishops to obey Archbishop Thurstan.

Next, John convened the Synod of Westminster in September 1125, which was attended by both the archbishops of Canterbury and York, together with twenty bishops and forty abbots. Although the synod issued rulings on the forbidding of simony and of holding multiple sees at the same time, it did not touch on the vexed question of primacy between Canterbury and York. Instead, John summoned the two prelates to travel with him to Rome to discuss the matter in person before Honorius. They arrived in late 1125 and were greeted warmly by Honorius, and they remained in Rome until early 1126. While there, Honorius ruled that the Bishop of St Andrews was to be subject to the Archbishop of York and in the more contentious issue, he attempted to circumvent his way around the problem by declaring that Thurstan was subject to William de Corbeil, not in his role as Archbishop of Canterbury, but as papal legate for England and Scotland. To emphasise this, Honorius decreed that the Archbishop of Canterbury could not ask for any oath of obedience from the Archbishop of York, and in the matter of honorary distinction, it was the Archbishop of Canterbury in his role as Legate that was the most elevated ecclesiastic in the kingdom.

Urban of Llandaff also travelled to Rome on numerous occasions to meet with Honorius throughout 1128 and 1129, to plead his case that his diocese should not be subject to the see of Canterbury. Although he obtained numerous privileges for his see and Honorius always spoke encouragingly to him, Honorius avoided having to make a decision that might alienate the powerful archbishops of Canterbury.

In Spain, Honorius was deeply suspicious of the ambitions of Diego Gelmírez, the Archbishop of Compostela. Although Pope Callixtus II had made him Papal Legate of a number of Spanish provinces, Honorius informed Diego that he had been made aware of Diego's ambitions and subtly advised him to keep his ambition in check. Still hoping to be promoted to the office of Legate of Spain, Diego sent envoys to Rome, carrying with them 300 gold Almoravid coins, two hundred and twenty for Honorius and another eighty for the Curia. Honorius repeated that his hands were tied, as he had just appointed a cardinal for that post.

Nevertheless, Honorius was not prepared to completely alienate Diego, and when the Archbishop of Braga nominated a successor to the vacant See of Coimbra, Honorius reprimanded the archbishop for usurping the rights of Diego, who should have been the one to nominate a successor. Honorius also demanded that the Archbishop of Braga present himself before Honorius on the second Sunday after Easter in 1129 to answer for his actions. Honorius also ensured that Diego should play a leading role in the Synod of Carrión (February 1130), having his legate approach Diego and ask for his assistance during the synod.

Honorius also wished to promote the ongoing struggle against the Moors in Spain, and to that end he bestowed the city of Tarragona, which had been recently captured from the Moors, to Robert d'Aguiló. Robert travelled to Rome to receive the gift from Honorius in 1128.

=== Establishment of the Templars and affairs in the East ===
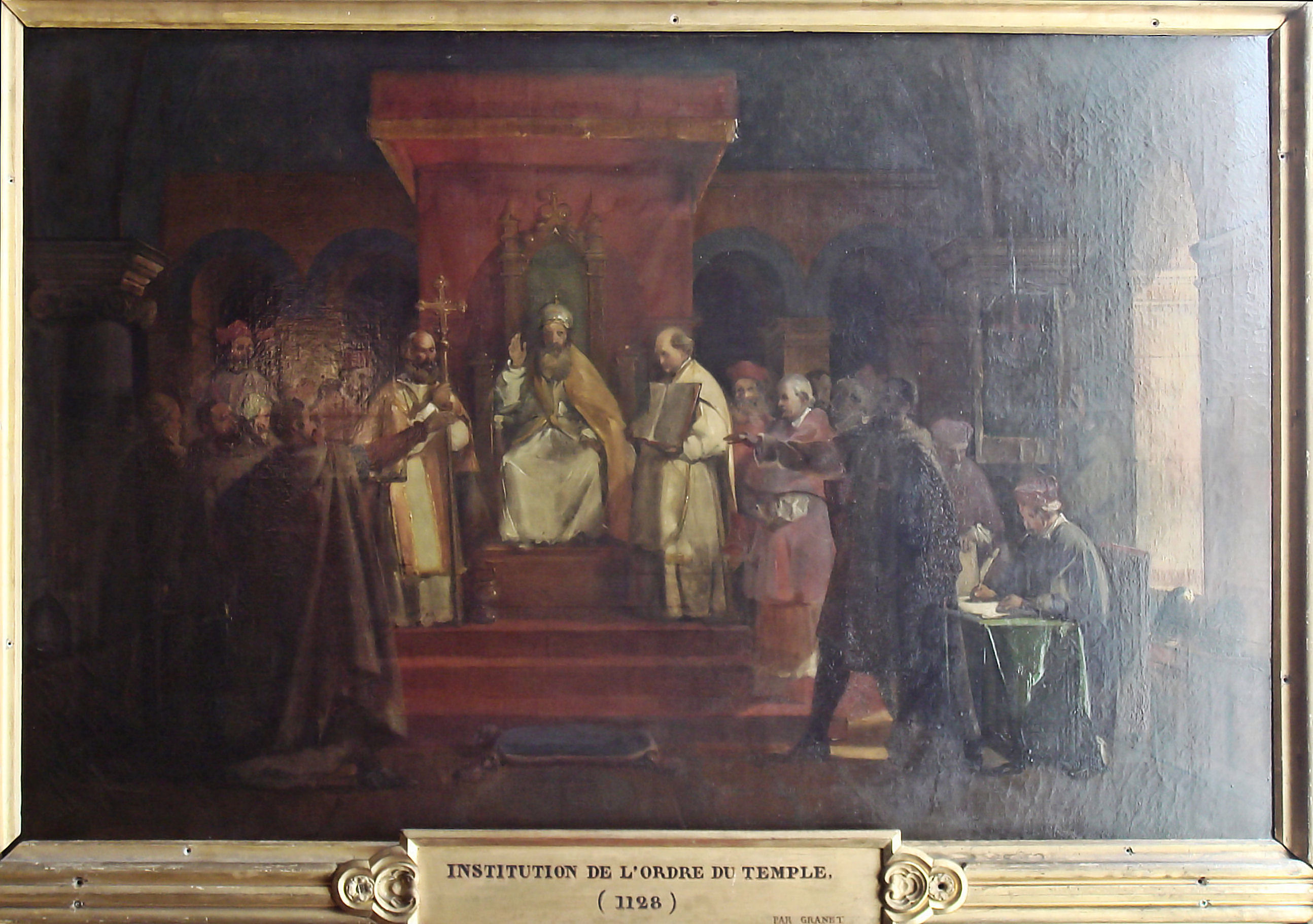
19th century depiction of Pope Honorius II granting official recognition to the Knights Templar

In 1119, a new religious order had been established by some French noblemen. Called the Knights Templar, they were to protect Christian pilgrims entering the Holy Land and to defend the conquests of the Crusades. However, by the pontificate of Honorius II, they had not yet received any official sanction from the papacy. To rectify this situation, some members of the order appeared before the Council of Troyes in 1129, where the Council expressed its approval of the order and commissioned Bernard of Clairvaux to draw up the order's rules, which now included vows of poverty, chastity and obedience. The order and the rules were subsequently approved by Honorius.

Honorius, as suzerain of the Kingdom of Jerusalem, re-confirmed the election of King Baldwin II of Jerusalem and established him as the royal patron of the Templars. Honorius tried to manage as best he could the rivalries of the different princes and high-ranking ecclesiastics that were destabilising the Latin Kingdom of Jerusalem. Long-standing arguments over areas of jurisdiction between the Latin Patriarchs of Antioch and Jerusalem were a constant source of irritation to Honorius. Honorius supported the claims of William of Malines, the new Archbishop of Tyre who claimed jurisdiction over some of the sees that had traditionally belonged to Bernard of Valence, the Patriarch of Antioch. Bernard refused to give up his claims to the sees, and William travelled to Rome and presented his case before Honorius. The pope sent a legate back to Palestine with instructions that Bernard was to acquiesce and that the various bishops were to submit to William of Malines within forty days. Bernard managed to resist implementing Honorius's instructions, and soon Honorius was too ill to do anything about it.

=== Death of Honorius II ===
After almost a year of suffering a painful illness, Honorius fell seriously ill in early 1130. Cardinal Aymeric and the Frangipani family began planning their next moves, and Honorius was taken to the San Gregorio Magno al Celio monastery, which was located in the territory controlled by the Frangipani. Supporters of the Pierleoni family, already preparing to back Pietro Pierleoni on a rumor that Honorius had died, stormed the monastery of the dying Honorius, hoping to force the election of Pietro. Only the sight of the still living Honorius in full pontifical robes forced them to disperse.

Nevertheless, Cardinal Aymeric's plans had not yet reached fruition when Honorius died on the evening of 13 February 1130. The cardinals supporting the Frangipani immediately closed the monastery gates and refused to allow anyone inside. The next day, and contrary to the usual customs, Honorius was quickly buried without any pomp or ceremony in the monastery, as the hand-picked cardinals got around to electing Gregorio Papareschi, who took the name Pope Innocent II. At the same time, the excluded cardinals, most of whom were supporters of the Pierleoni family, elected Pietro Pierleoni, who took the name Anacletus II, throwing the church once again into schism. Honorius eventually transferred from the monastery to the Lateran for reburial once Innocent II had been elected. He was buried in the south transept next to the body of Callixtus II.

== Legacy ==
The way in which Honorius was elected meant that he became a creature, not only of Cardinal Aymeric, but also of the Frangipani family. Aymeric expanded his powerbase further, with Honorius elevating mostly non-Roman candidates to the college of cardinals, while papal legates were now chosen solely within the papal circle. Honorius favoured the newer monastic orders, such as the Augustinians, a departure from the policies of the older Gregorian popes who favoured traditional orders such as the Benedictines.

At the same time, he found himself drawn into the continued chaos of local Roman politics, as the Frangipani enjoyed their influence at the papal court, while the Pierleoni family continually fought against them and against Honorius. Their ceaseless infighting, repressed during the pontificate of Calixtus II, broke out again, and Honorius found he did not have the resources to suppress the Pierleoni, nor the authority to rein in the Frangipani. Honorius was required to engage in a number of petty wars in Rome, which wasted his time and were in the long haul unsuccessful in restoring order in the streets. The continued chaos would be instrumental in the events that saw the resurrection of Republican sentiment in the city and the eventual establishment of the Commune of Rome in the following decade.

== See also ==
- List of popes
- Cardinals created by Honorius II

== Sources ==
- Bergamo, Mario da (1968) OFM Cist. [Luigi Pellegrini], "La duplice elezione papale del 1130: I precedenti immediati e i protagonisti," Contributi dell' Istituto di Storia Medioevale, Raccolta di studi in memoria di Giovanni Soranzo II (Milan), 265–302.
- Catholic Encyclopedia: Honorius II
- Duffy, Eamon (2001). Saints and Sinners: A History of the Popes. Yale University Press. pp. 140–141. ISBN 978-0-300-09165-6.
- Gregorovius, Ferdinand (1896) History of Rome in the Middle Ages, Volume IV. 2 second edition, revised (London: George Bell).
- Hüls, Rudolf (1977) Kardinäle, Klerus und Kirchen Roms: 1049–1130 (Tübingen) [Bibliothek des Deutschen Historischen Instituts in Rom, Band 48].
- Levillain, Philippe (2002) The Papacy: An Encyclopedia, Vol II: Gaius-Proxies, Routledge
- Mann, Horace K. (1925). The Lives of the Popes in the Middle Ages: 1099-1130. Vol. 8. Kegan Paul.
- Pandulphus Pisanus (1723) "Vita Calisti Papae II," "Vita Honorii II," Ludovico Antonio Muratori (editor), Rerum Italicarum Scriptores III. 1 (Milan), pp. 418–419; 421–422.
- Stroll, Mary (1987) The Jewish Pope (New York: Brill 1987).
- Stroll, Mary (2005) Calixtus II (New York: Brill 2005).
- Thomas, P. C. (2007) A Compact History of the Popes, St Pauls BYB

Catholic Church titles
Preceded by Callixtus II	Pope; 1124–30	Succeeded by Innocent II
