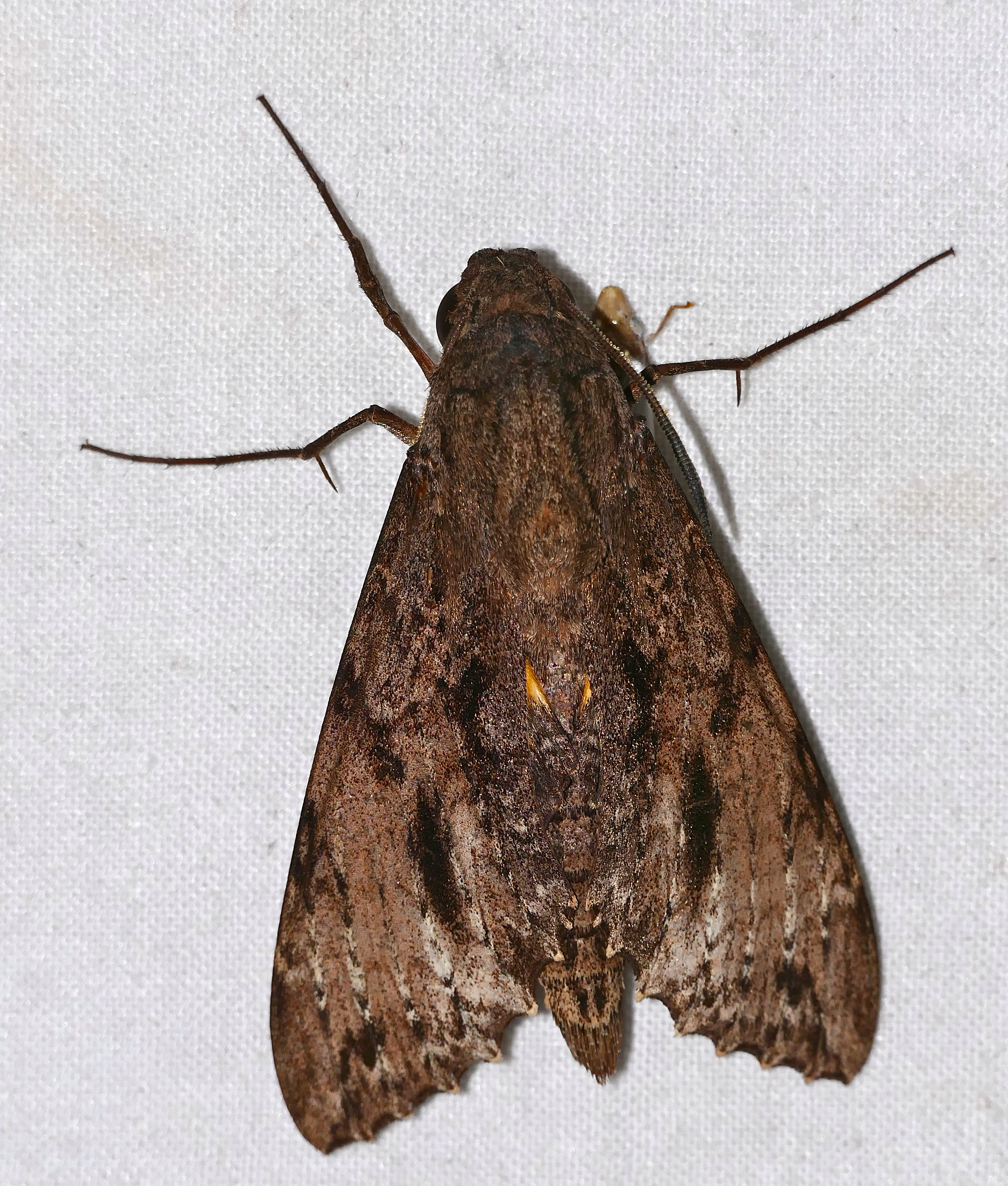

Scientific classification
- Domain: Eukaryota
- Kingdom: Animalia
- Phylum: Arthropoda
- Class: Insecta
- Order: Lepidoptera
- Family: Sphingidae
- Genus: Isognathus
- Species: I. swainsonii

Binomial name
- Isognathus swainsonii Felder & Felder, 1862

Synonyms
- Isognathus fumosa Butler, 1875; Isognathus zebra Clark, 1923; Isognathus rimosa brasiliensis Clark, 1919

= Isognathus swainsonii =

Species of moth

Isognathus swainsonii is a moth of the family Sphingidae.

== Distribution ==
It is found from French Guiana, Peru and Brazil to Bolivia.

== Description ==
The wingspan is about 82 mm. It is similar to Isognathus leachii, but the forewing upperside has more white scaling, there are interrupted white vein-streaks on the distal half of the wing, the basal patch is thinner and the marginal spots at the ends of veins are larger and paler grey.

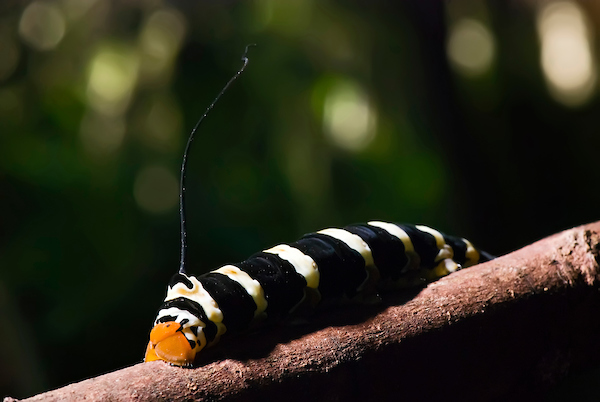
Larva

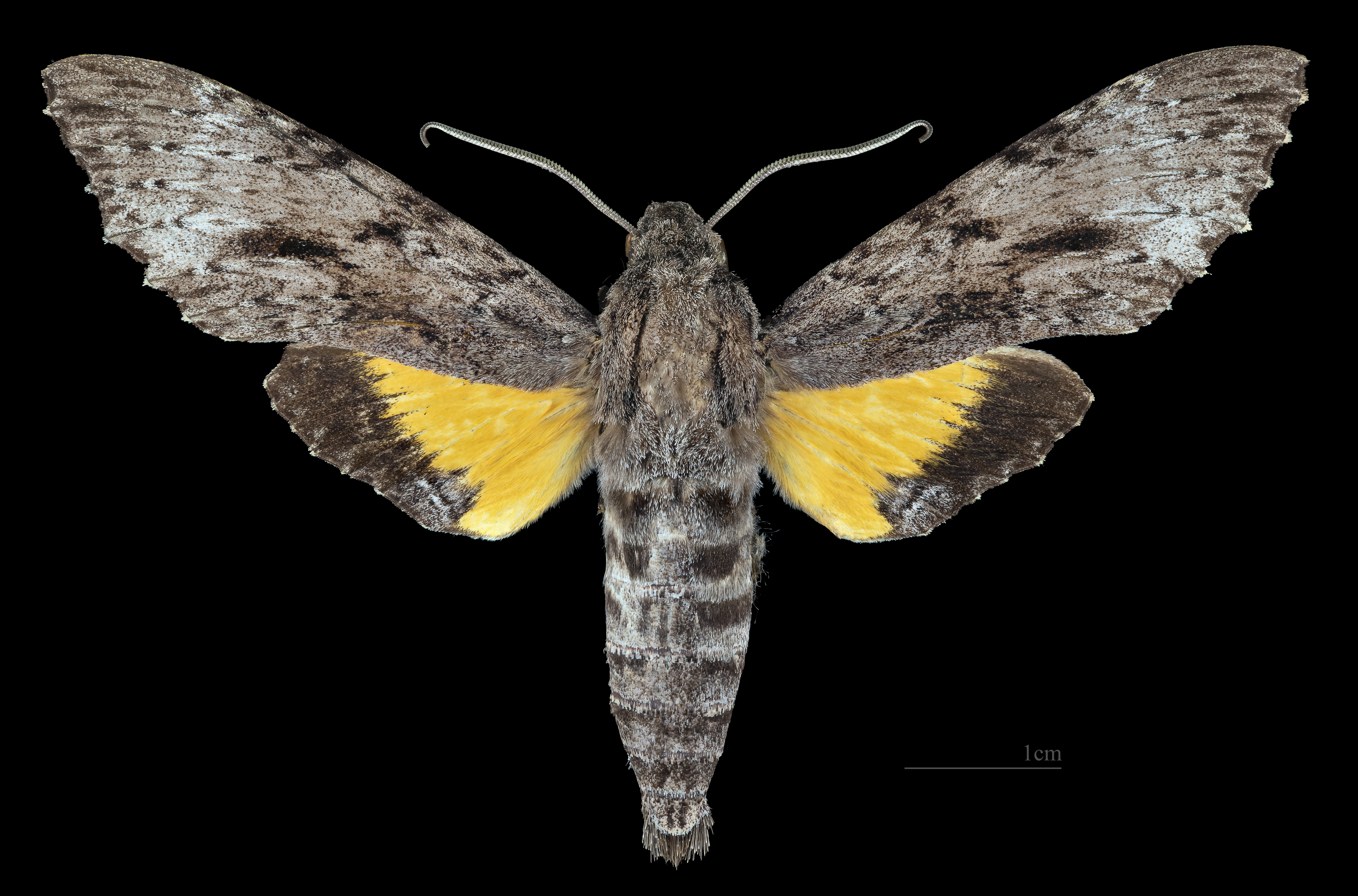
Male dorsal

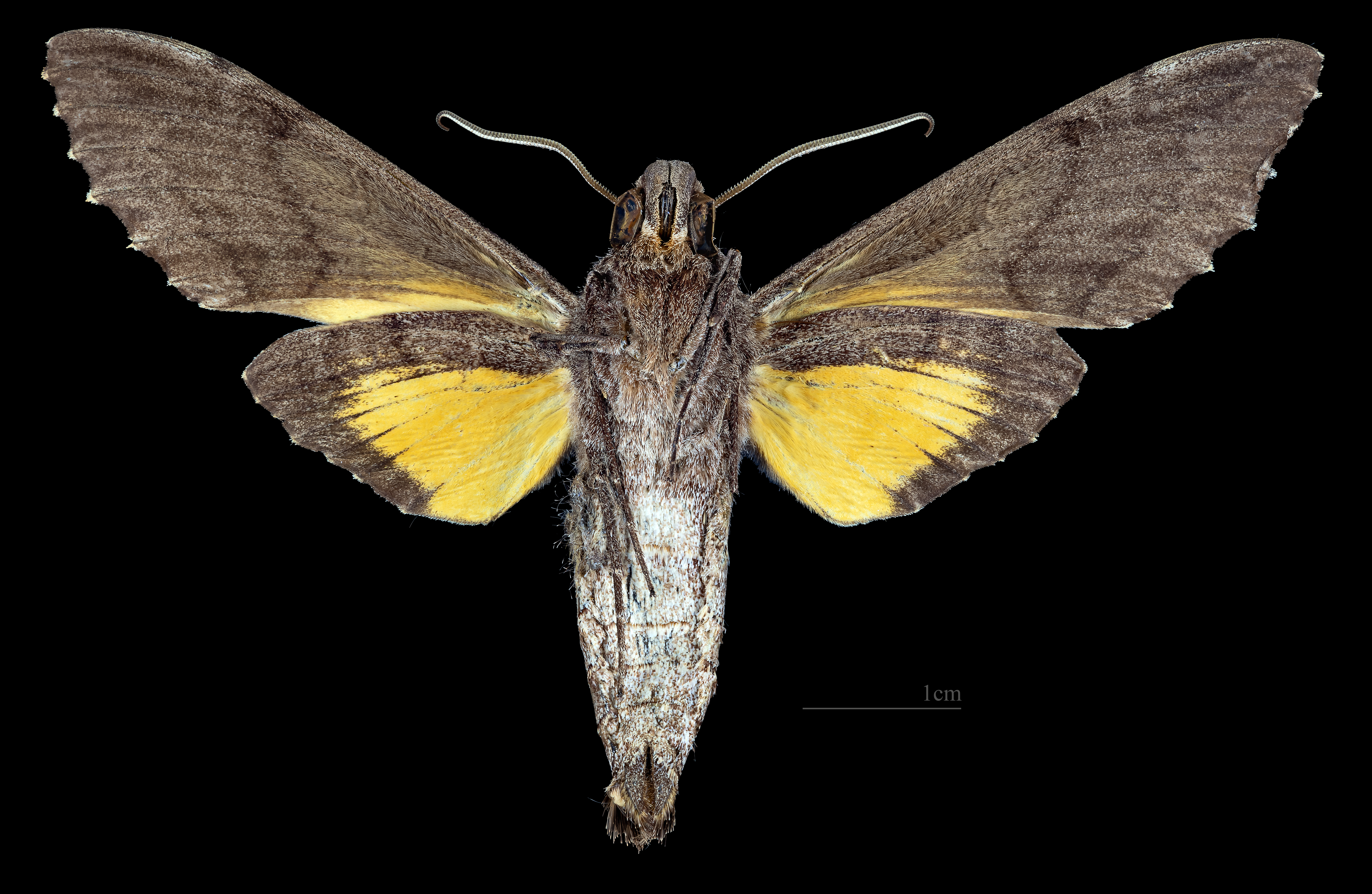
Male ventral

== Biology ==
There are probably multiple generations per year.

The larvae have been recorded feeding on Plumeria acuminata. They have long tails and are very colourful, suggesting they are unpalatable to birds.
