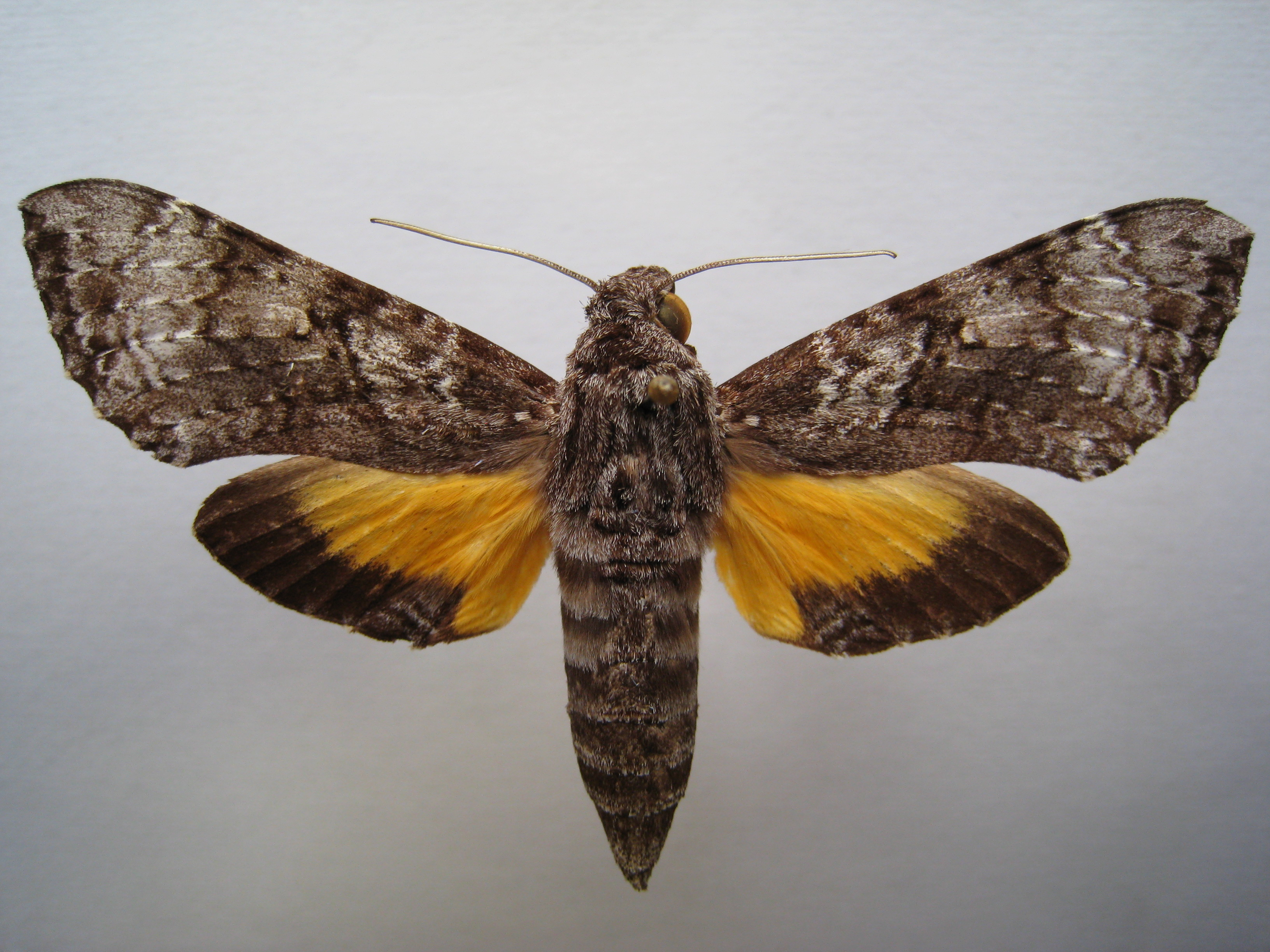

Scientific classification
- Domain: Eukaryota
- Kingdom: Animalia
- Phylum: Arthropoda
- Class: Insecta
- Order: Lepidoptera
- Family: Sphingidae
- Genus: Isognathus
- Species: I. mossi

Binomial name
- Isognathus mossi Clark, 1919

= Isognathus mossi =

Species of moth

Isognathus mossi is a moth of the family Sphingidae. It is known from eastern Brazil and Venezuela.

The length of the forewings is 36 mm for males and 41 mm for females. It is similar to Isognathus menechus but smaller and the ground colour of the body and wings (both above and below) is much darker. Furthermore, the forewings are relatively shorter.

There are probably multiple generations per year.

The larvae probably feed on Apocynaceae species. They have long tails and are very colourful, suggesting they are unpalatable to birds.

== Subspecies ==
- Isognathus mossi mossi (eastern Brazil)
- Isognathus mossi fabianae Lichy, 1981 (Venezuela)
