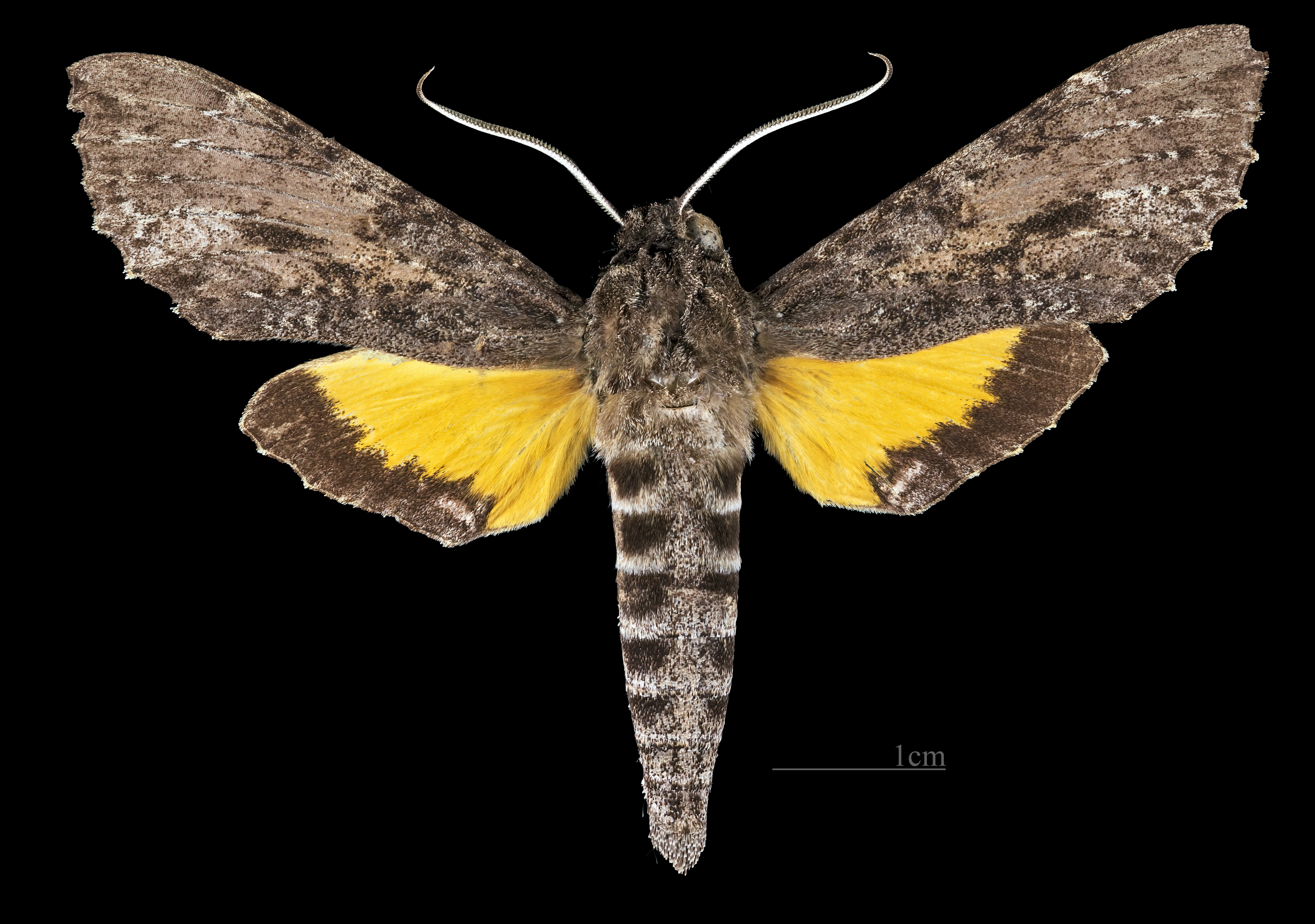
- Isognathus scyron ♂
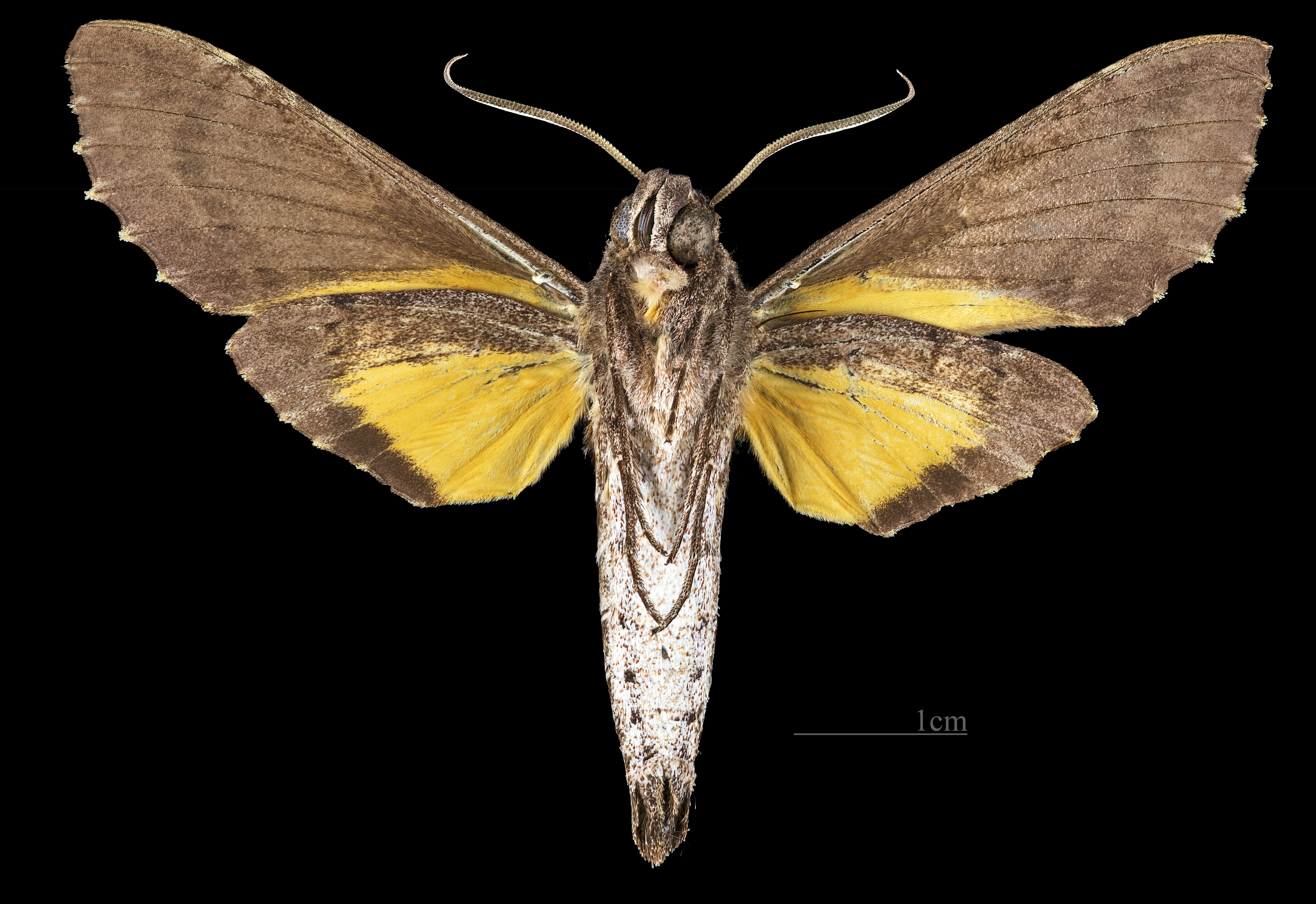
- Isognathus scyron ♂ △

Scientific classification
- Domain: Eukaryota
- Kingdom: Animalia
- Phylum: Arthropoda
- Class: Insecta
- Order: Lepidoptera
- Family: Sphingidae
- Genus: Isognathus
- Species: I. scyron

Binomial name
- Isognathus scyron (Cramer, 1780)

Synonyms
- Sphinx scyron Cramer, 1780; Anceryx pedilanthi Boisduval, 1875

= Isognathus scyron =

Species of moth

Isognathus scyron is a moth of the family Sphingidae.

== Distribution ==
It is known from Suriname, French Guiana, Cuba, Costa Rica and Guatemala.

== Description ==
The wingspan is 72–73 mm. There are distinct bands on the upperside of the abdomen and the underside of the abdomen is dirty white or slightly buff, faintly speckled with russet scales. The upperside of the thorax and forewings is russet-drab-brown. The outer half of the forewing upperside has grey vein-streaks which are interrupted by black dots.

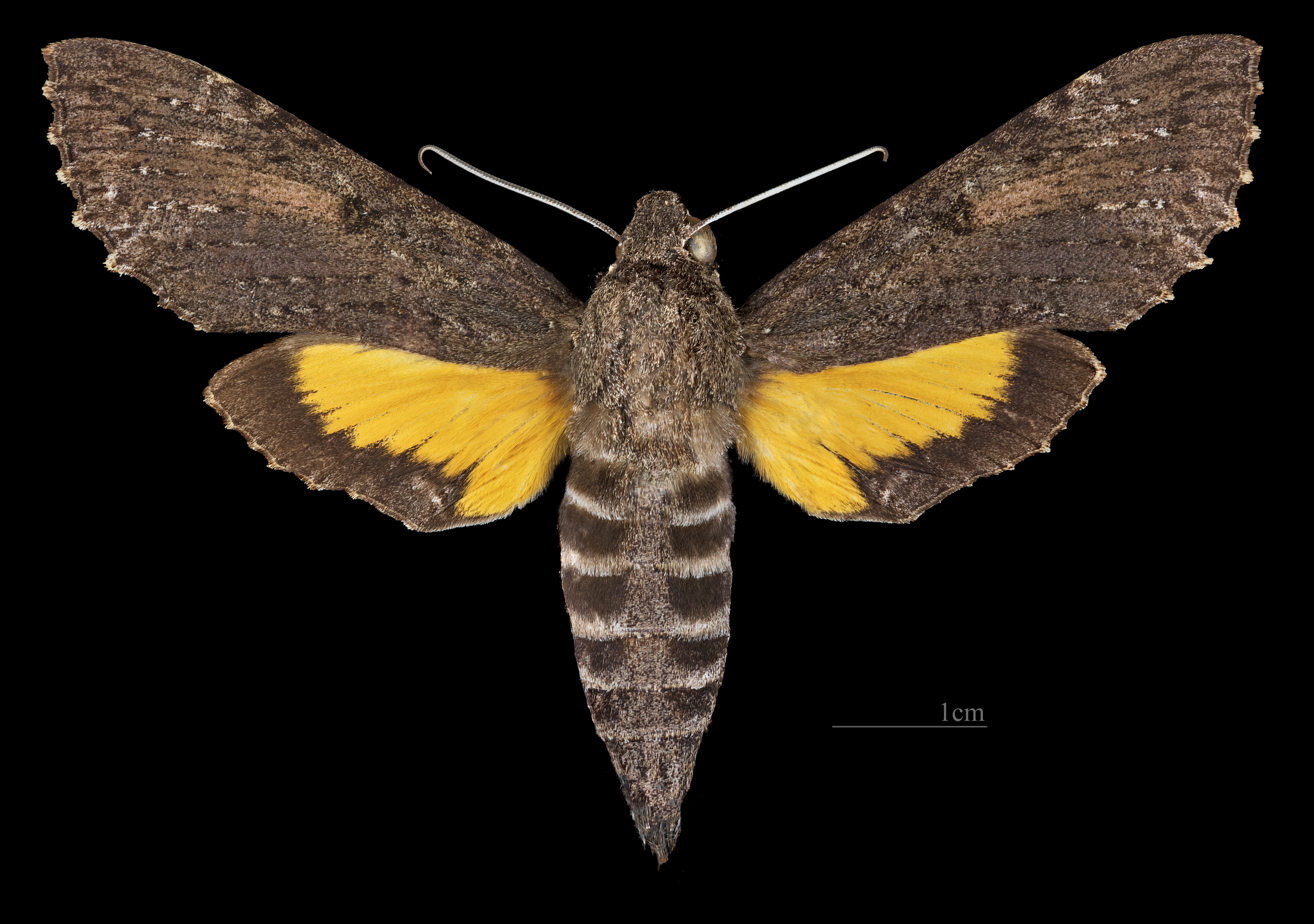
Isognathus scyron ♀

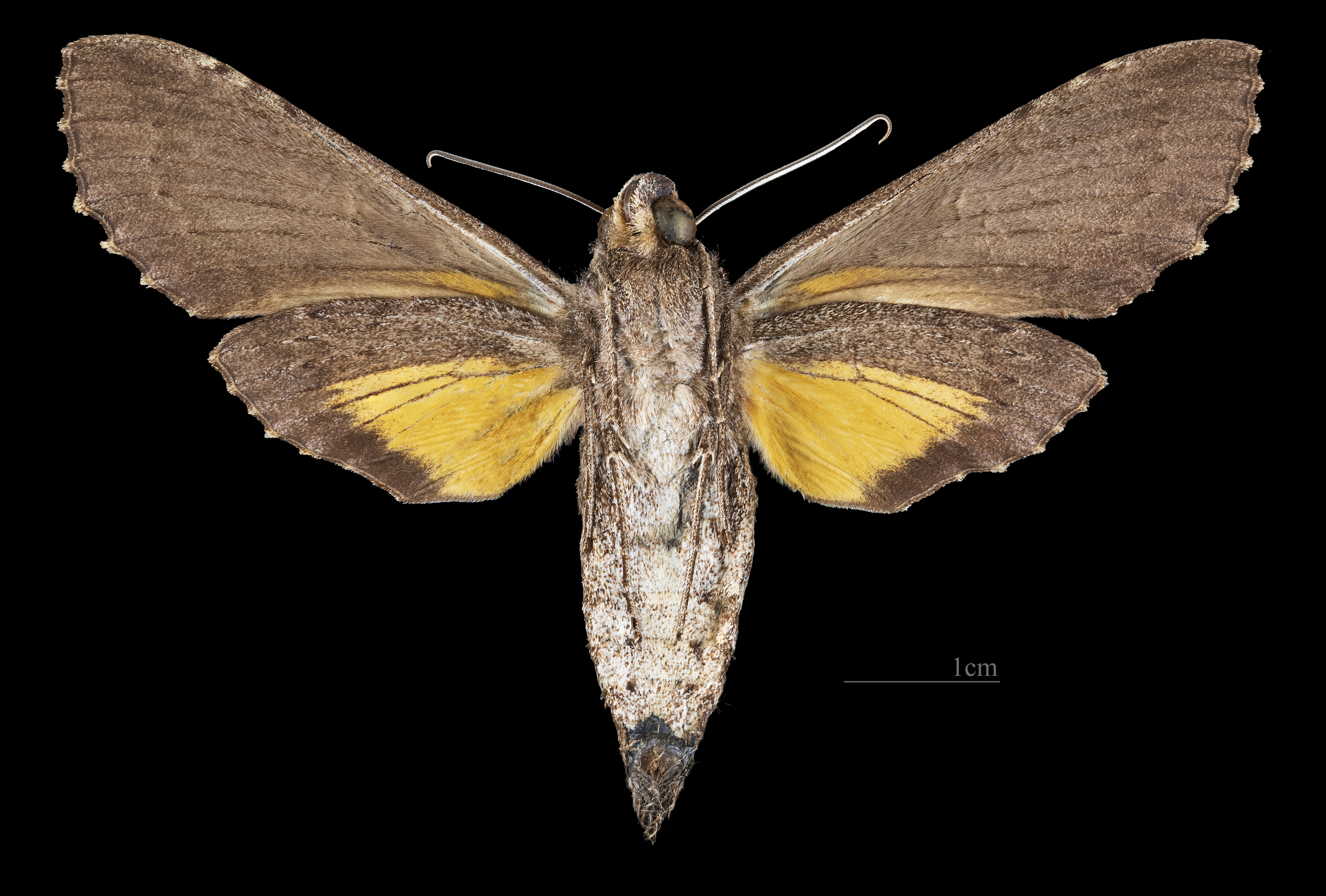
Isognathus scyron ♀ △

== Biology ==
Adults are on wing year round.

The larvae probably feed on Apocynaceae species. They have long tails and are very colourful, suggesting they are unpalatable to birds.
