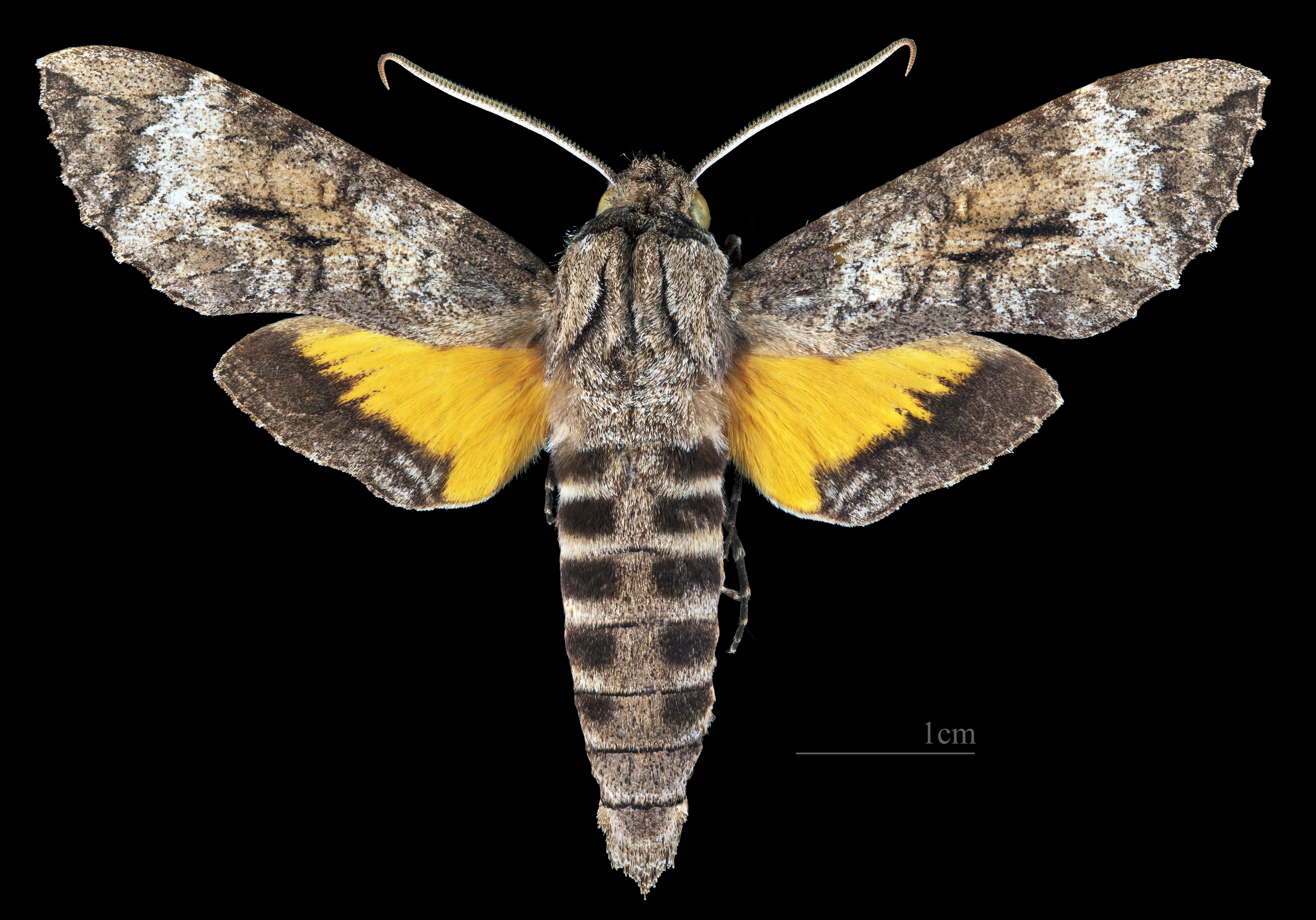
- ♂
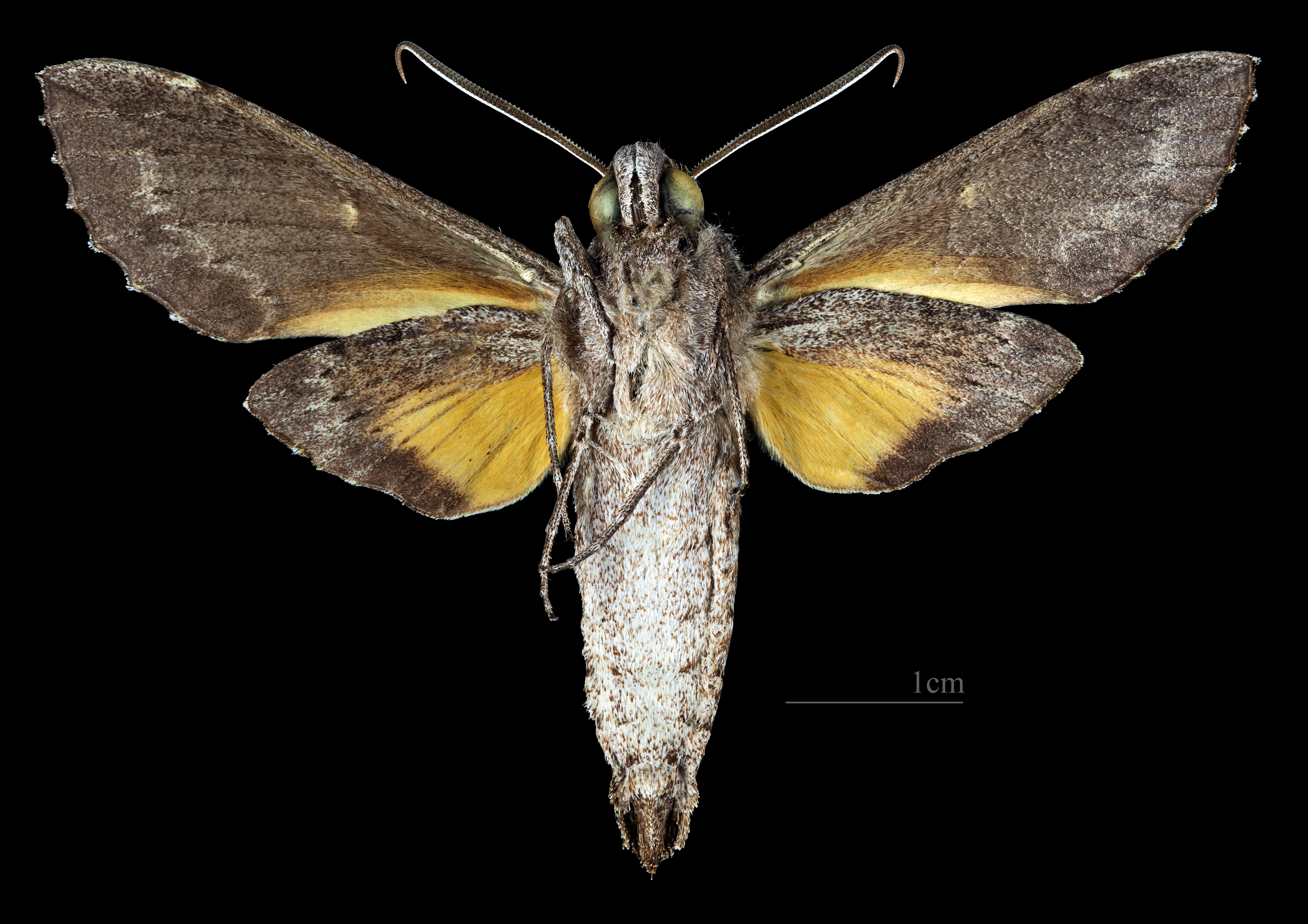
- ♂ △

Scientific classification
- Domain: Eukaryota
- Kingdom: Animalia
- Phylum: Arthropoda
- Class: Insecta
- Order: Lepidoptera
- Family: Sphingidae
- Genus: Isognathus
- Species: I. australis

Binomial name
- Isognathus australis Clark, 1917

= Isognathus australis =

Species of moth

Isognathus australis is a moth of the family Sphingidae.

== Distribution ==
It is known from north-eastern Brazil.

== Description ==
The wingspan is 70 mm for males. It is similar to Isognathus rimosa rimosa and Isognathus rimosa papayae but has narrower wings. The forewing upperside is unicolorous brown, shaded with white, except for a yellow band along the posterior margin and the faint traces of a distal marginal band. The basal area of the hindwing underside is yellow, the rest is brown with a bluish tinge, becoming black towards the anal angle.

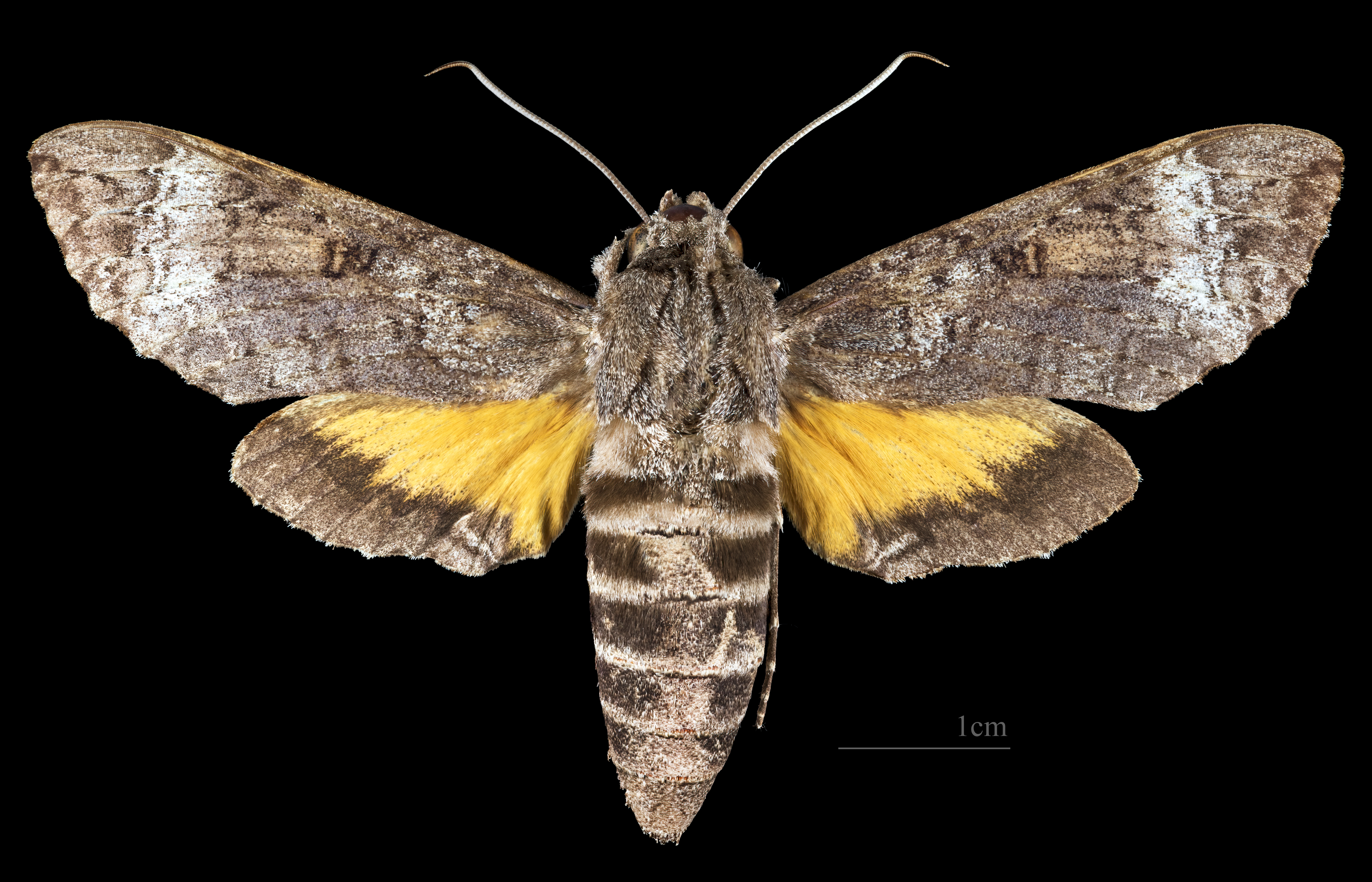
♀

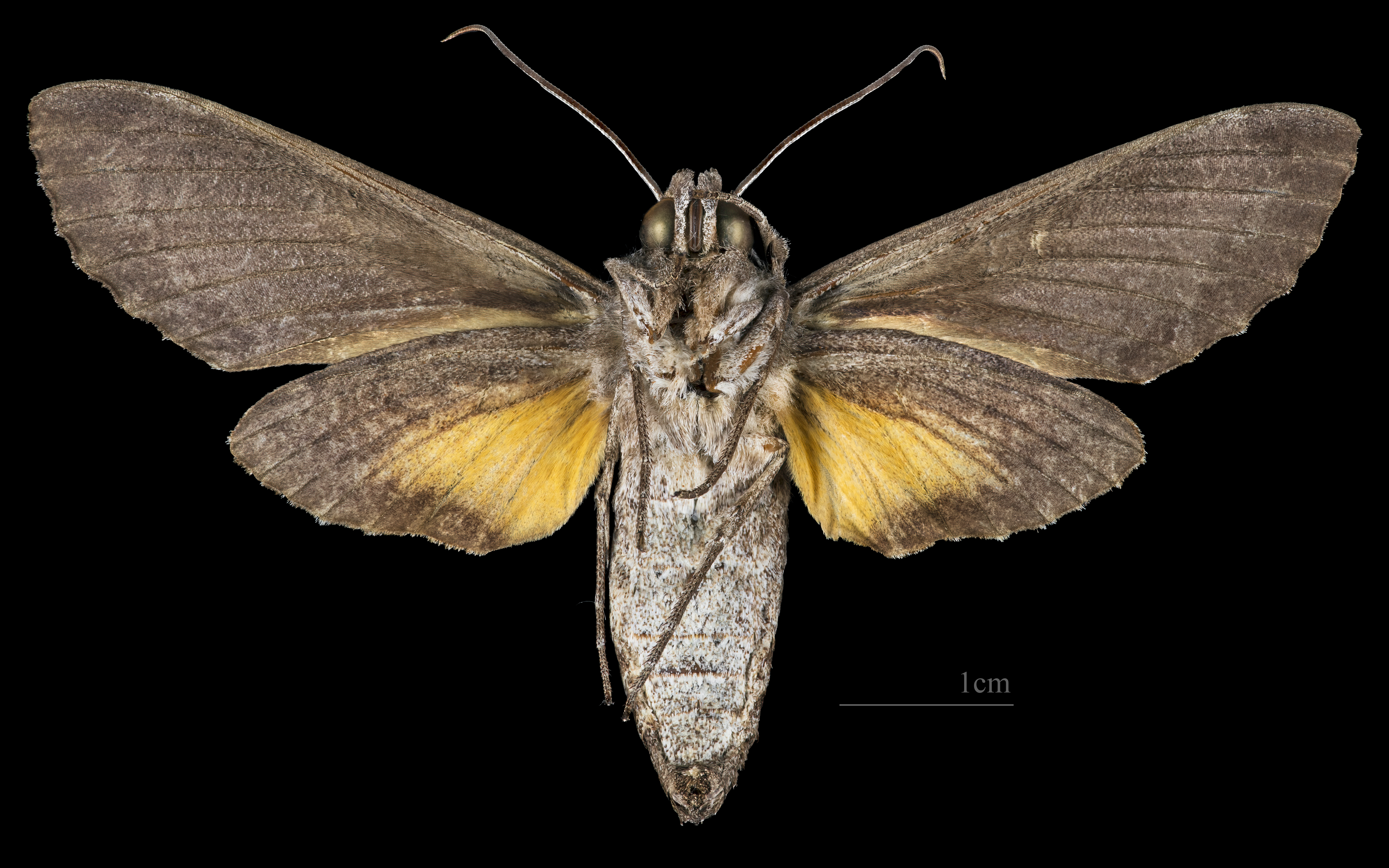
♀ △

== Biology ==
There are probably multiple generations per year. Adults have been recorded in January.

The larvae have been recorded feeding on Plumeria species.
