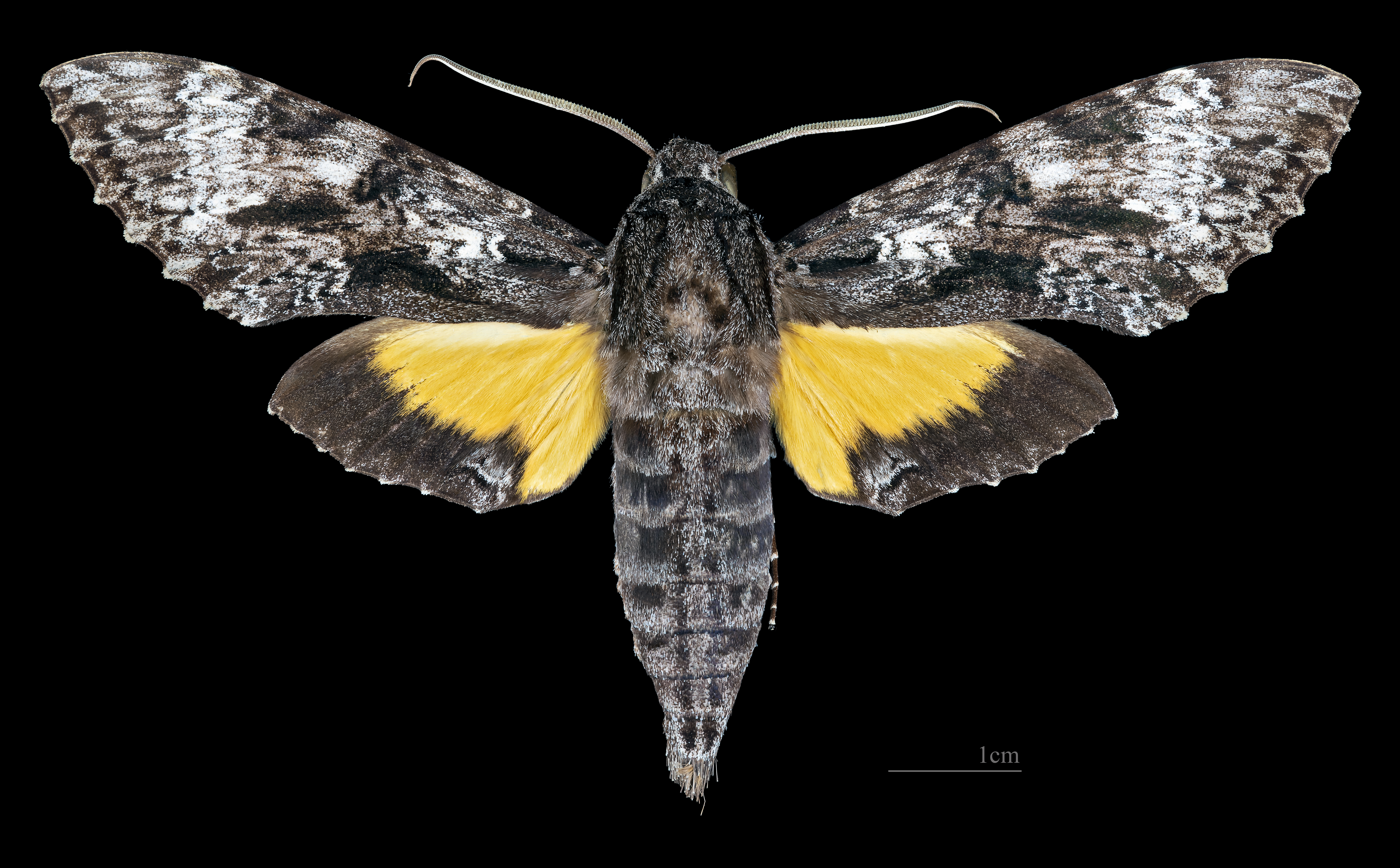
- Male dorsal
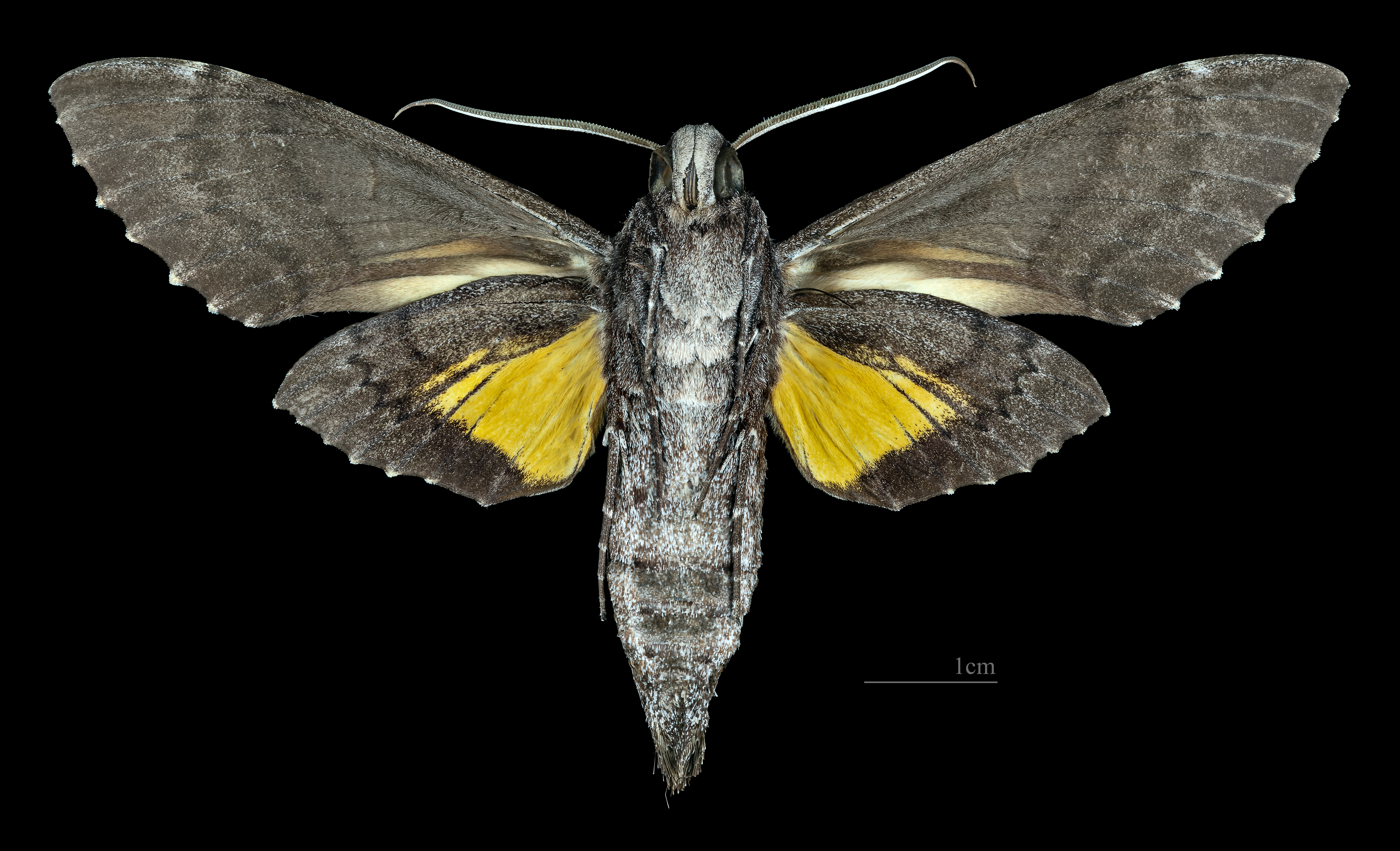
- Male ventral

Scientific classification
- Domain: Eukaryota
- Kingdom: Animalia
- Phylum: Arthropoda
- Class: Insecta
- Order: Lepidoptera
- Family: Sphingidae
- Genus: Isognathus
- Species: I. occidentalis

Binomial name
- Isognathus occidentalis Clark, 1929

Synonyms
- Isognathus amazonica Clark, 1928; Isognathus tepuyensis Lichy, 1962

= Isognathus occidentalis =

Species of moth

Isognathus occidentalis is a moth of the family Sphingidae.

== Distribution ==
It is known from Venezuela, northern Brazil and French Guiana.

== Description ==
There are probably multiple generations per year.

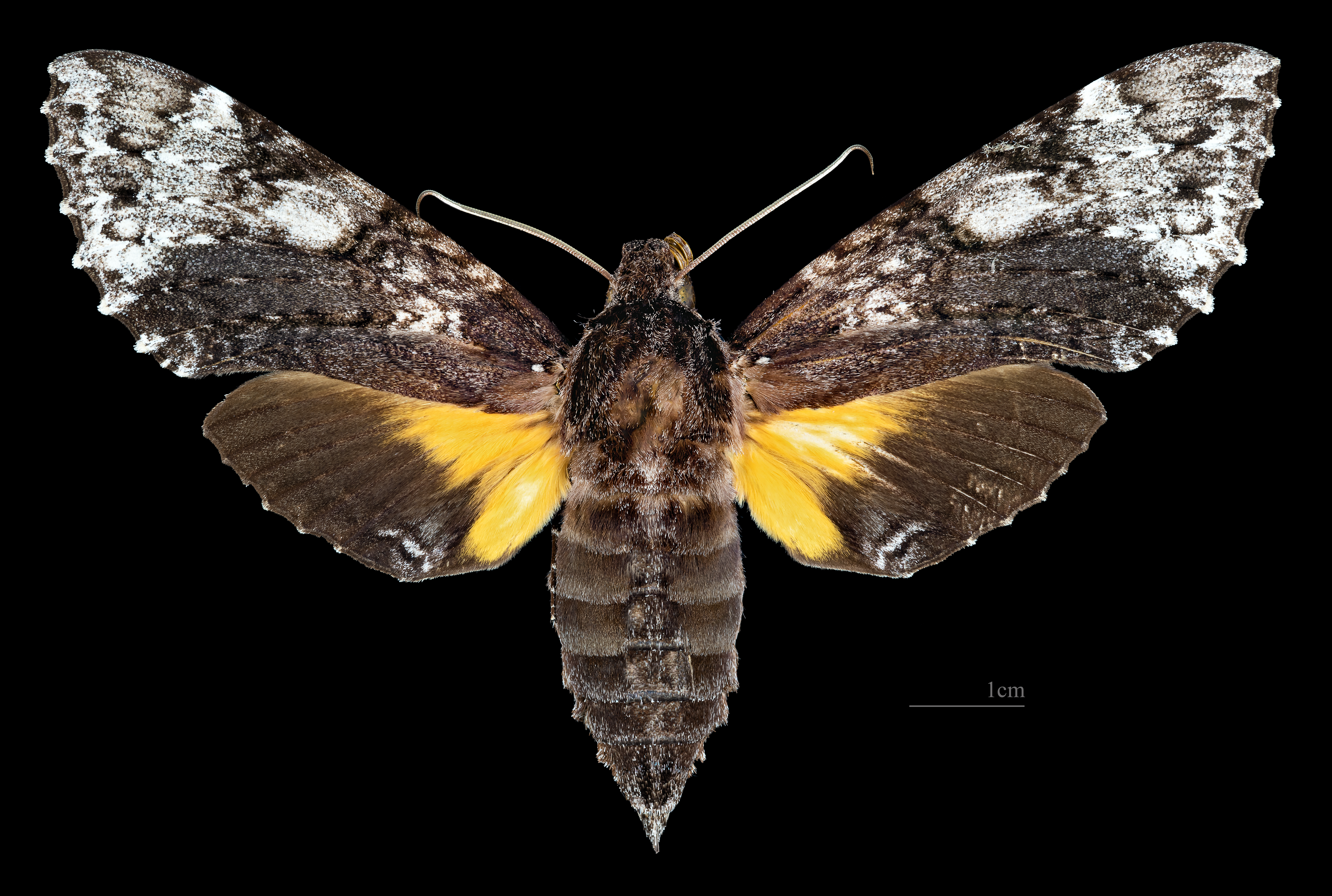
Female dorsal

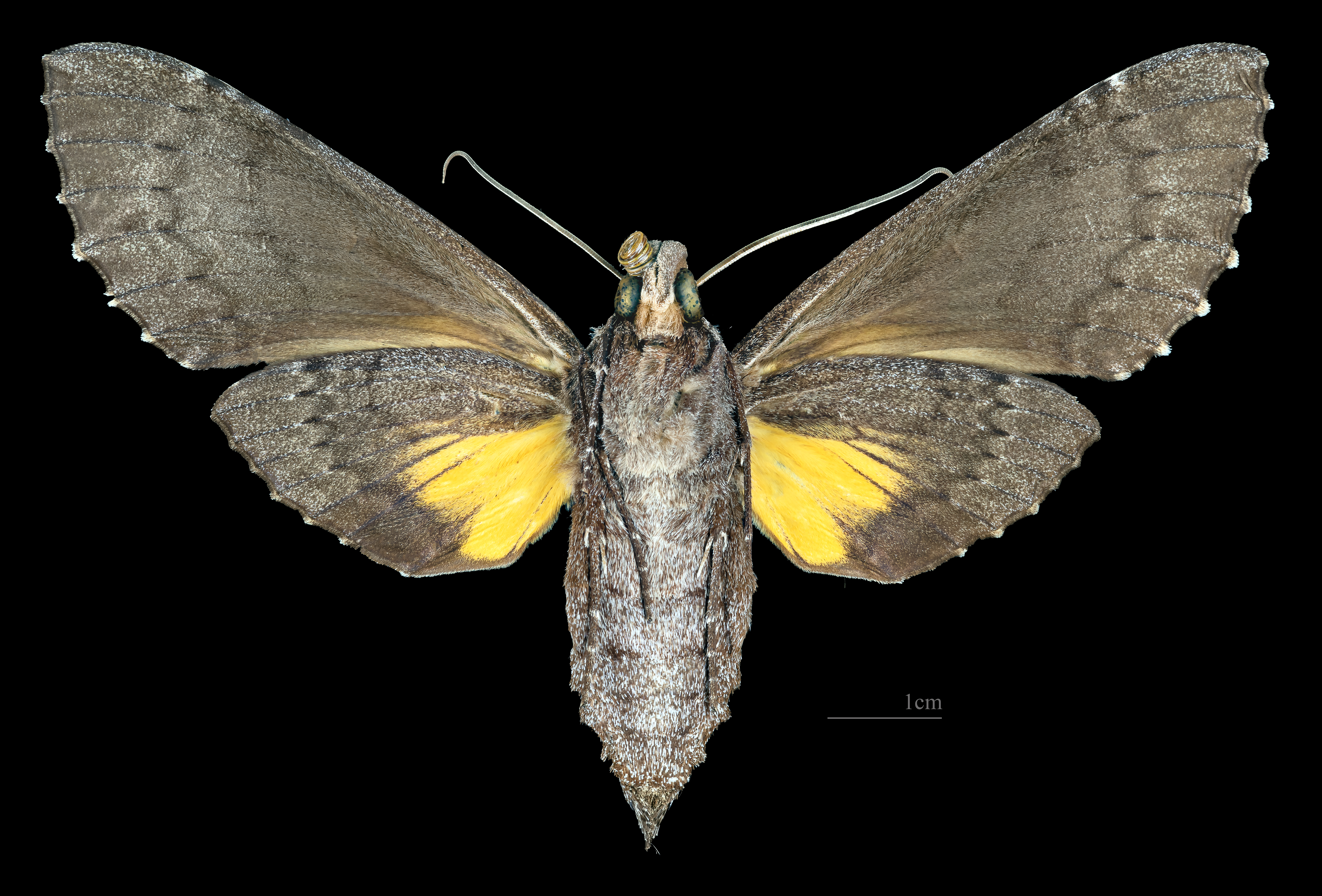
Female ventral

== Biology ==
The larvae have been recorded feeding on Himatanthus lancifolius. They have long tails and very colourful, suggesting they are unpalatable to birds.
