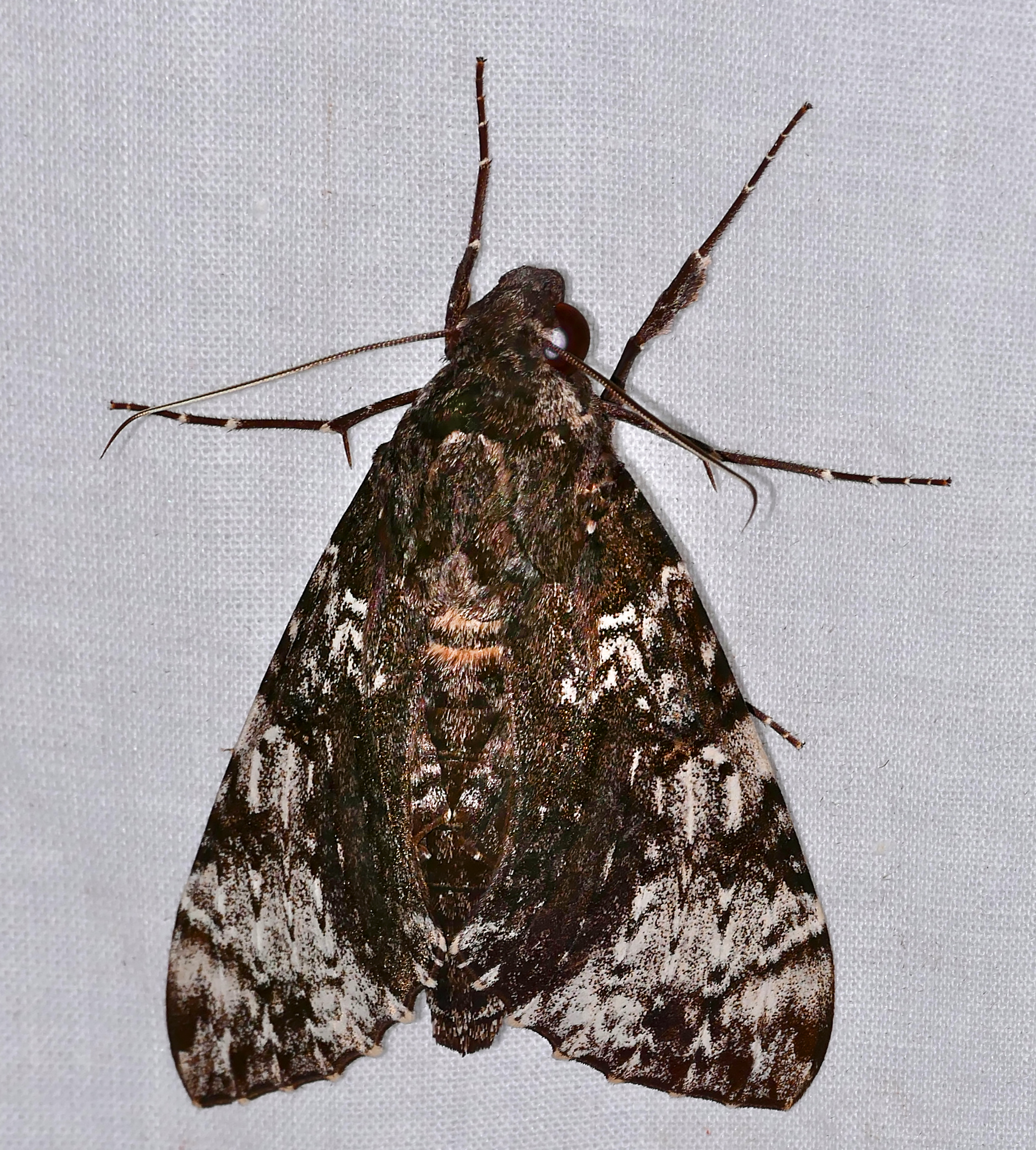
- Isognathus excelsior ♂

Scientific classification
- Domain: Eukaryota
- Kingdom: Animalia
- Phylum: Arthropoda
- Class: Insecta
- Order: Lepidoptera
- Family: Sphingidae
- Genus: Isognathus
- Species: I. excelsior

Binomial name
- Isognathus excelsior (Boisduval, 1875)

Synonyms
- Anceryx excelsior Boisduval, 1875

= Isognathus excelsior =

Species of moth

Isognathus excelsior is a moth of the family Sphingidae.

== Distribution ==
It is known from Colombia, Venezuela and Ecuador to north-western Brazil.

== Description ==
It can be distinguished from all other Isognathus species by the pure white underside to the abdomen with conspicuous paired black spots on each segment.

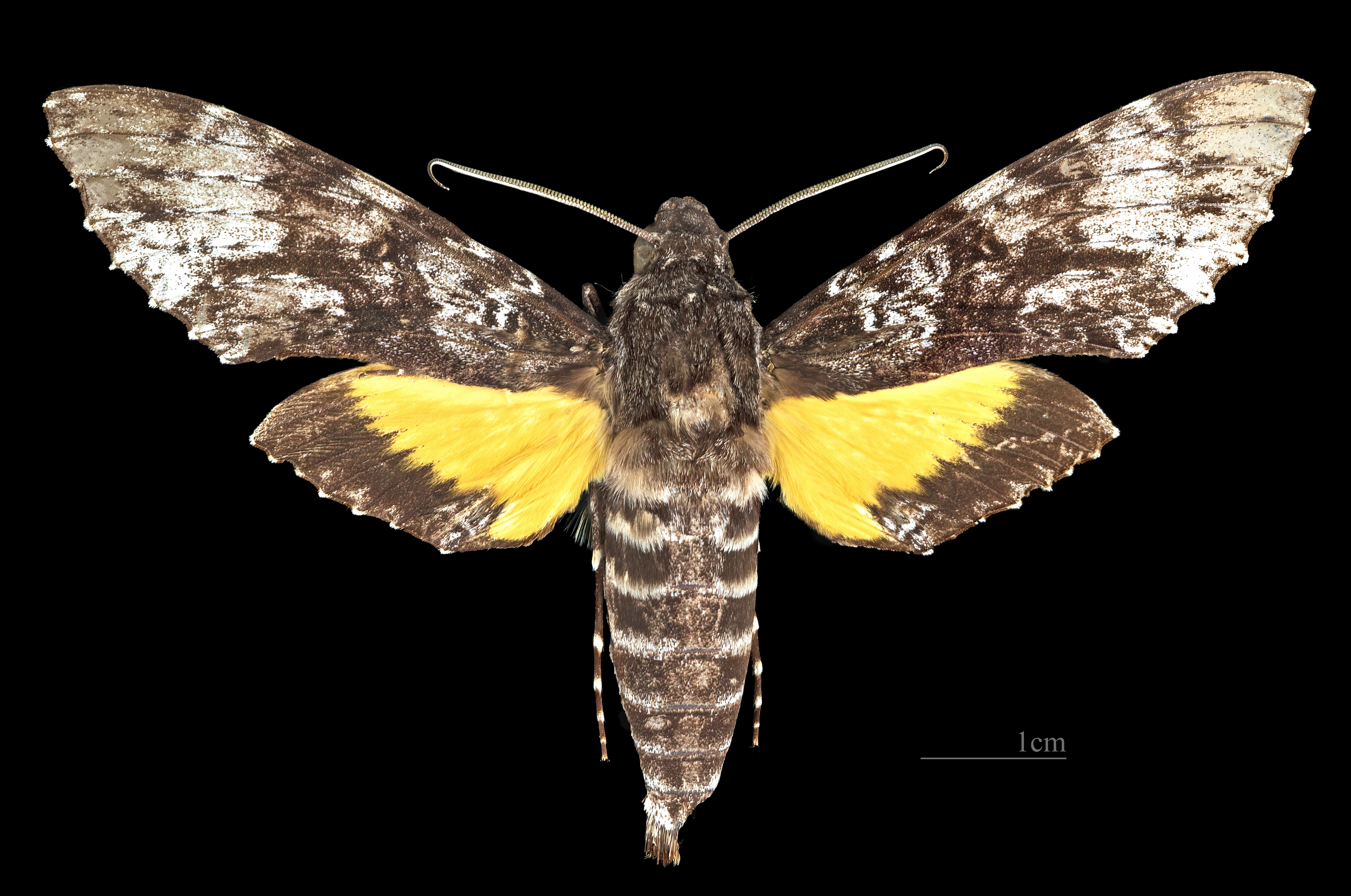
Isognathus excelsior ♂

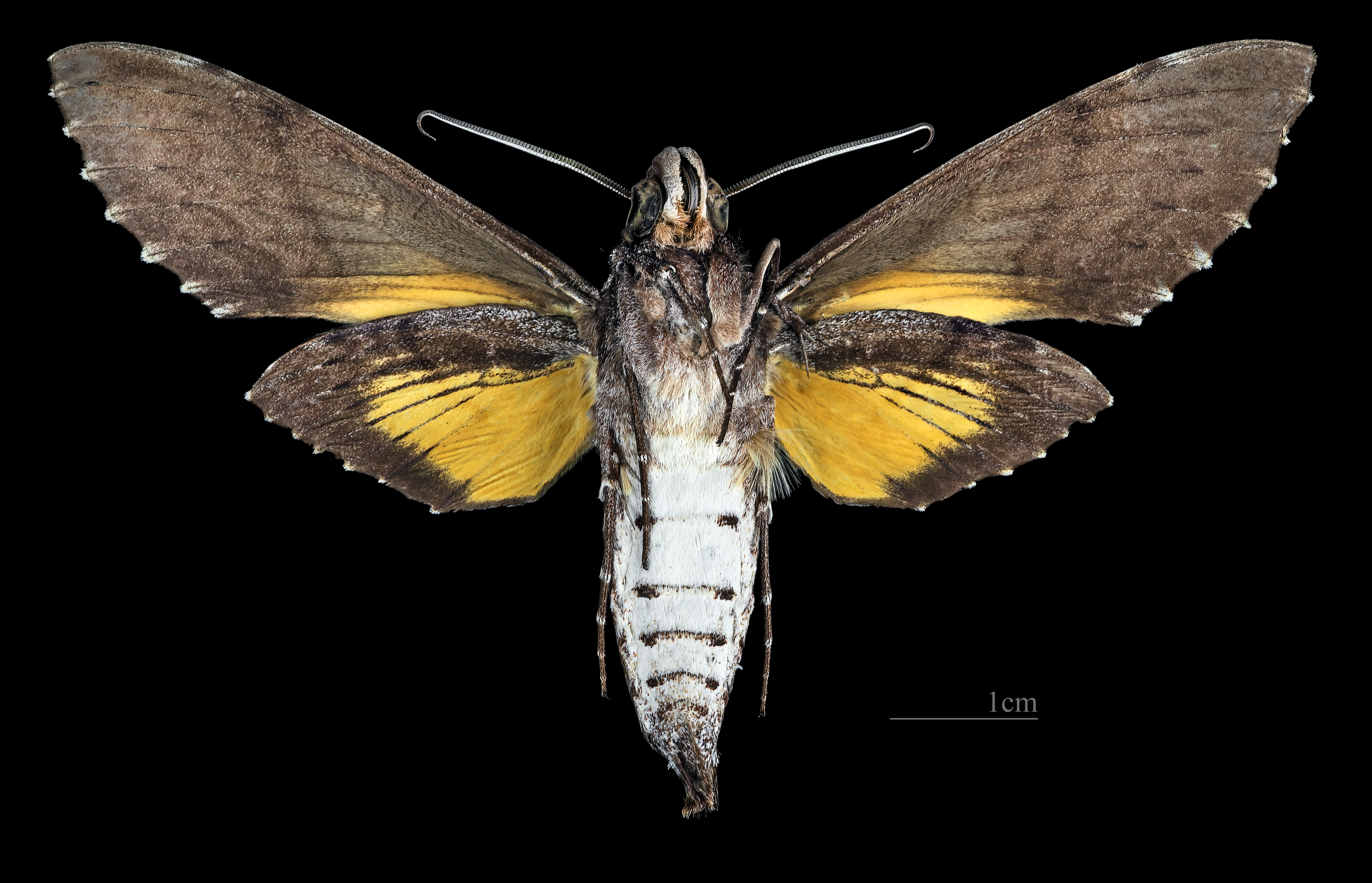
Isognathus excelsior ♂ △

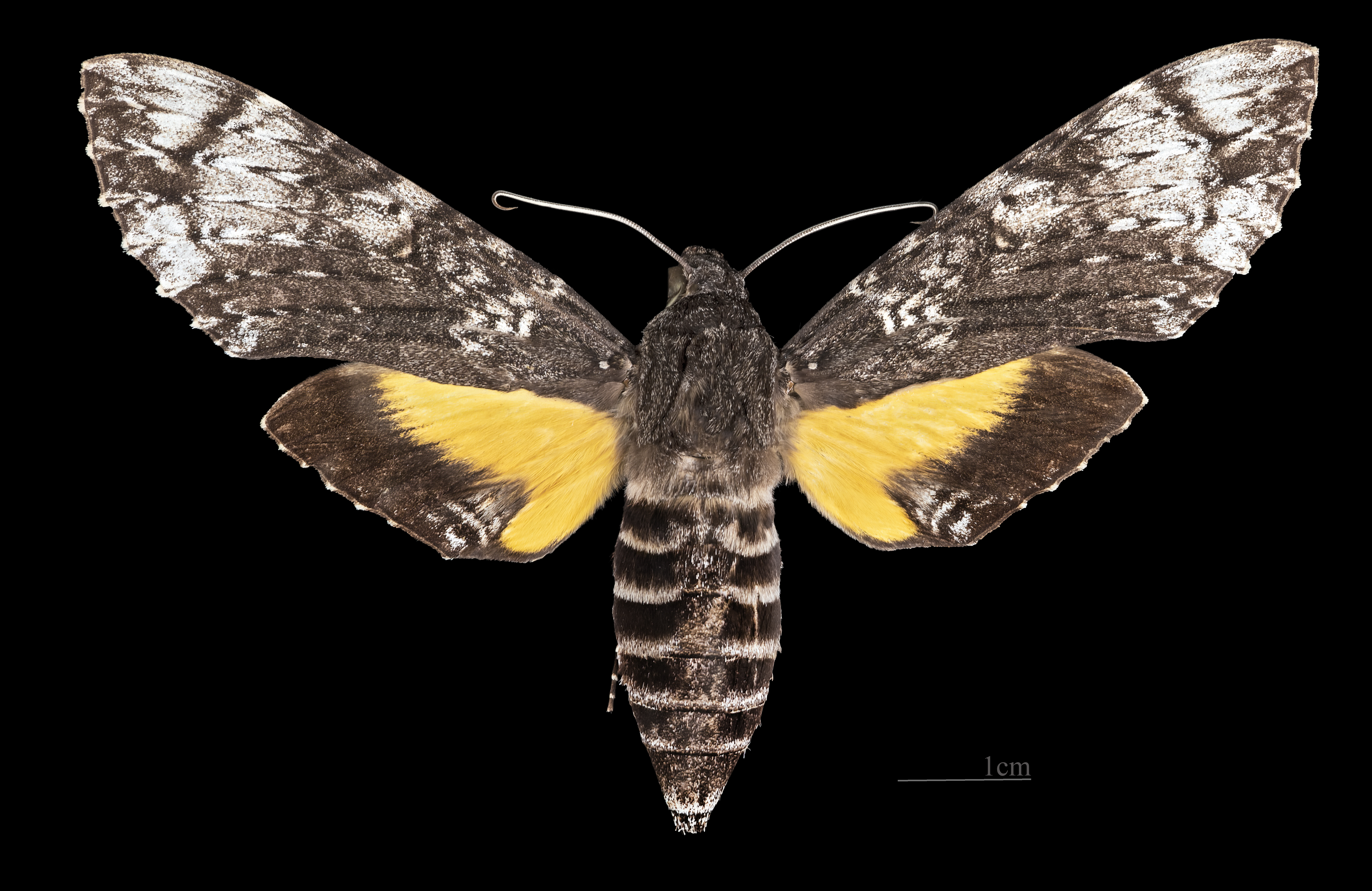
Isognathus excelsior ♀

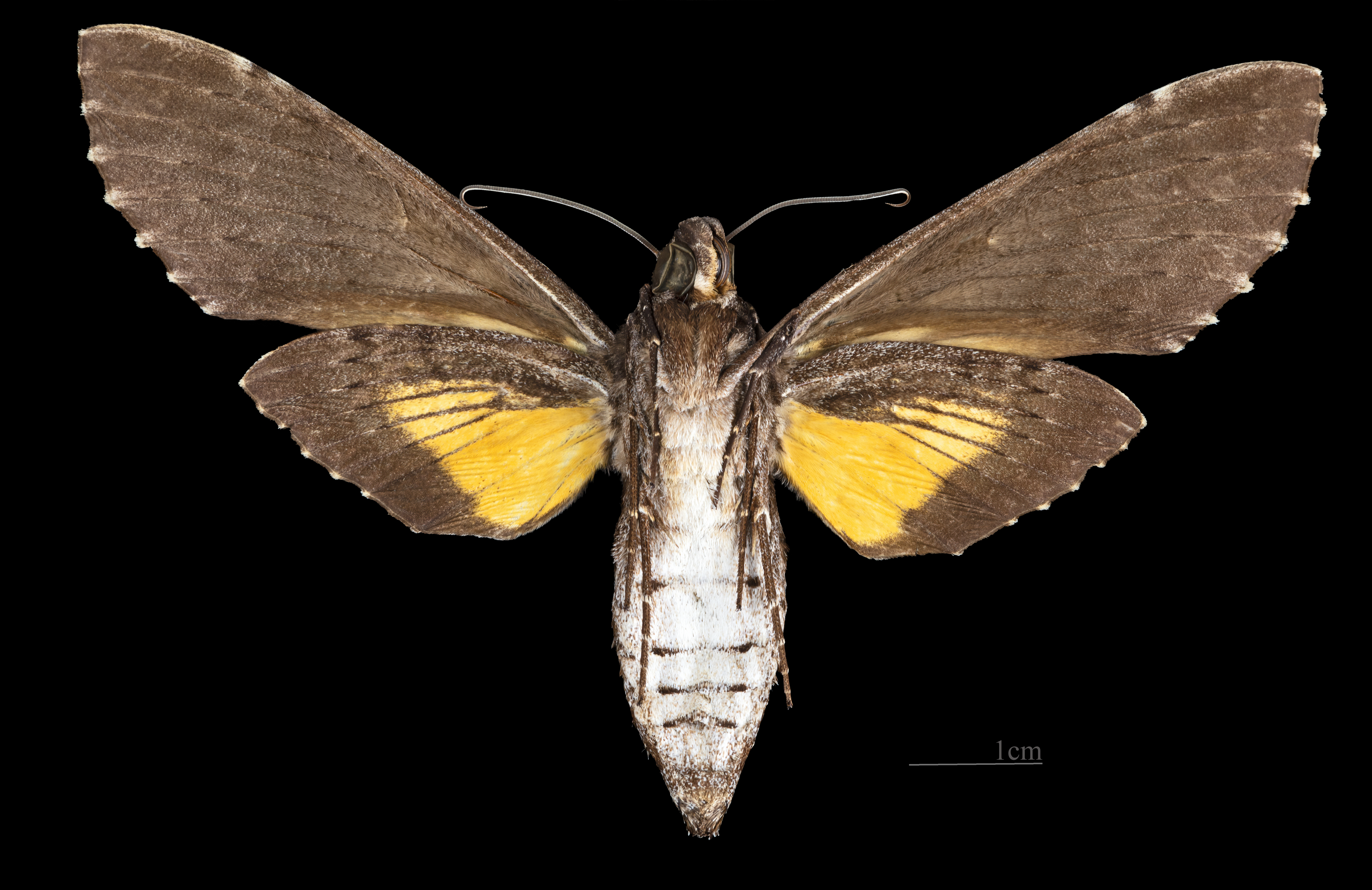
Isognathus excelsior ♀ △

== Biology ==
There are probably multiple generations per year.

The larvae probably feed on Apocynaceae species.
