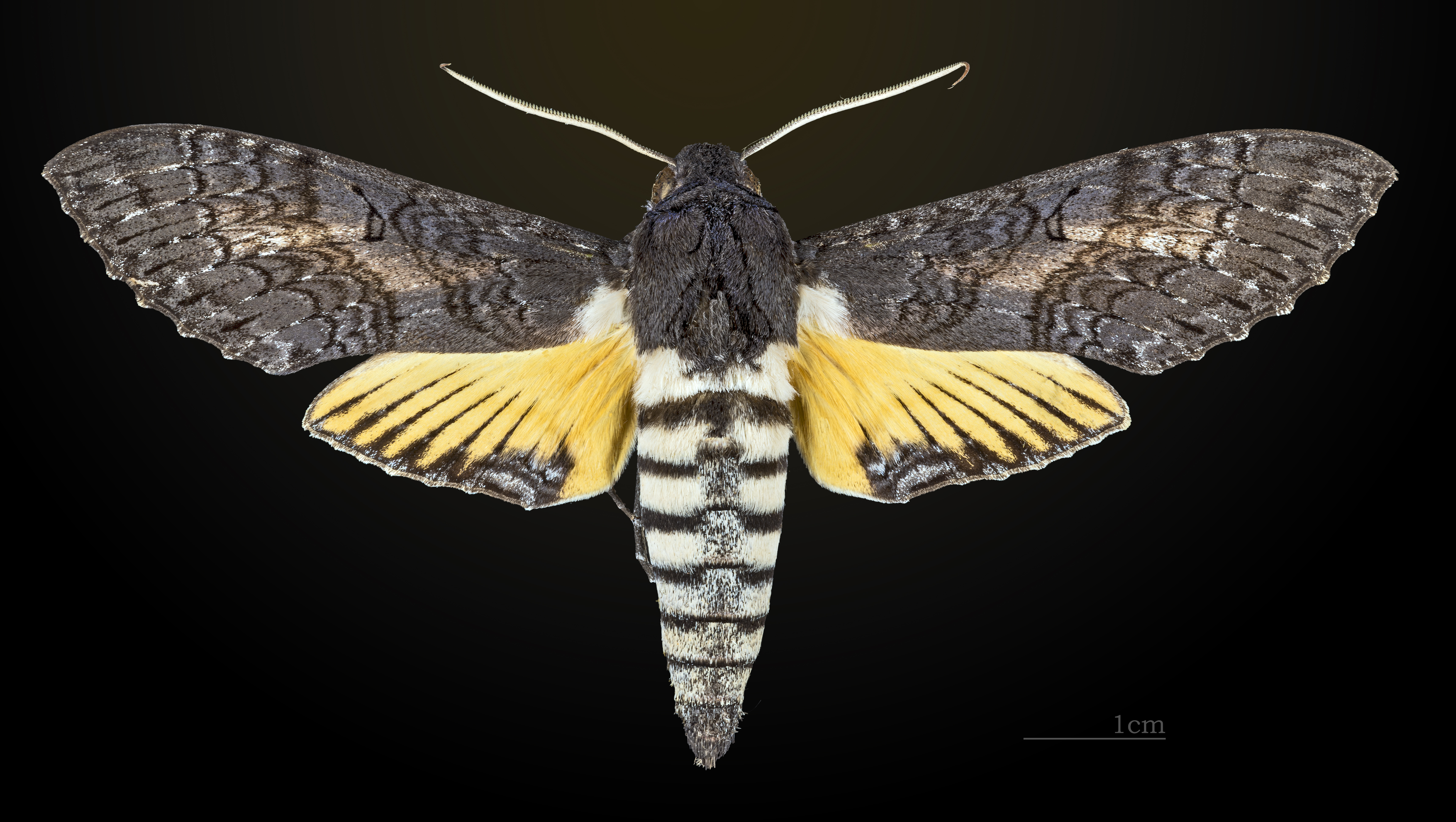
- Isognathus caricae

Scientific classification
- Domain: Eukaryota
- Kingdom: Animalia
- Phylum: Arthropoda
- Class: Insecta
- Order: Lepidoptera
- Family: Sphingidae
- Tribe: Dilophonotini
- Subtribe: Dilophonotina
- Genus: Isognathus; Felder & Felder, 1862

Species
- See text

Synonyms
- Tatoglossum Butler, 1876

= Isognathus =

Genus of moths

Isognathus is a genus of moths in the family Sphingidae.

== Species ==
- Isognathus allamandae Clark, 1920
- Isognathus australis Clark, 1917
- Isognathus caricae (Linnaeus, 1758)
- Isognathus excelsior (Boisduval, 1875)
- Isognathus leachii (Swainson, 1823)
- Isognathus menechus (Boisduval, 1875)
- Isognathus mossi Clark, 1919
- Isognathus occidentalis Clark, 1929
- Isognathus rimosa (Grote, 1865)
- Isognathus scyron (Cramer, 1780)
- Isognathus swainsonii Felder & Felder, 1862
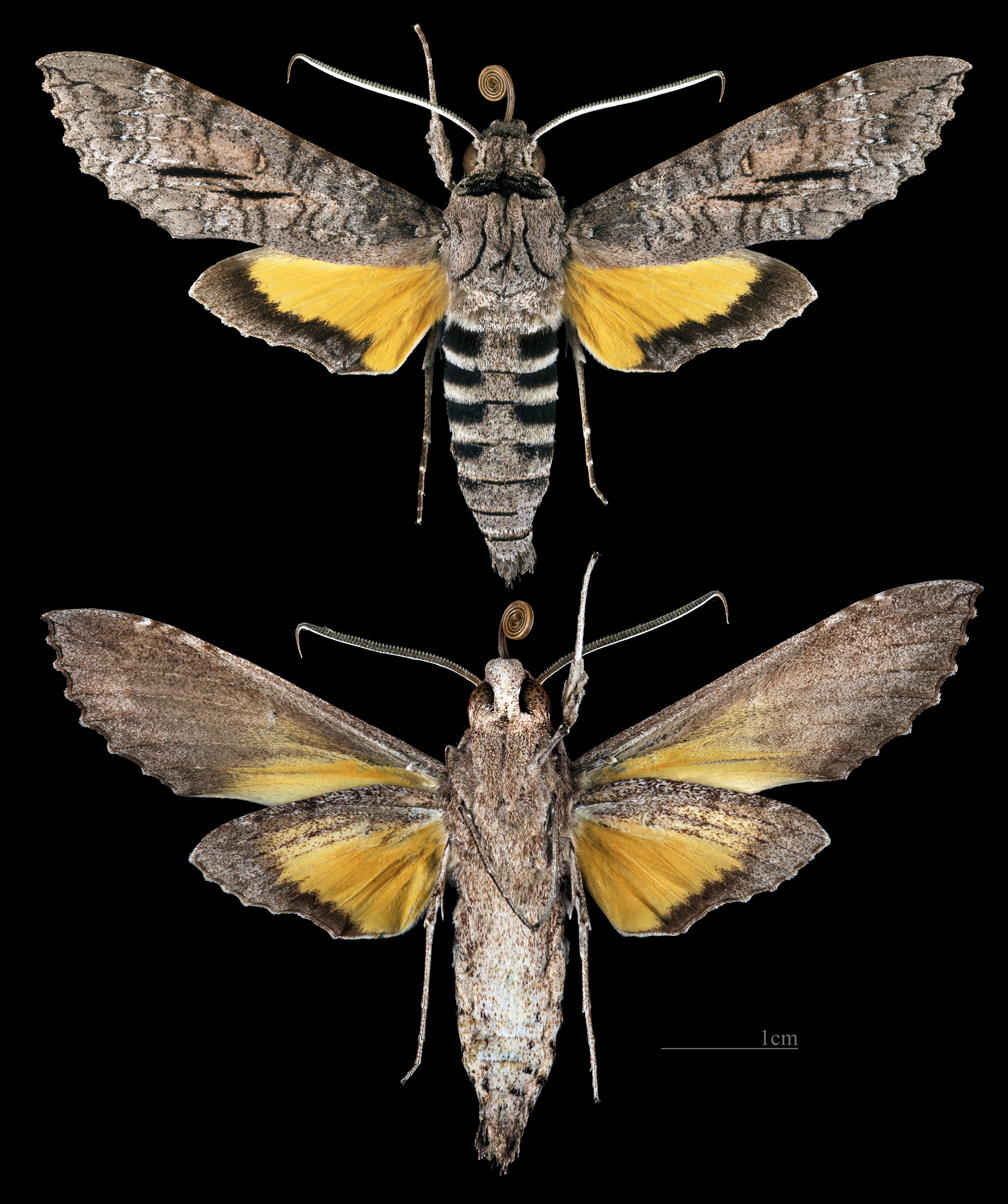
Isognathus allamandae

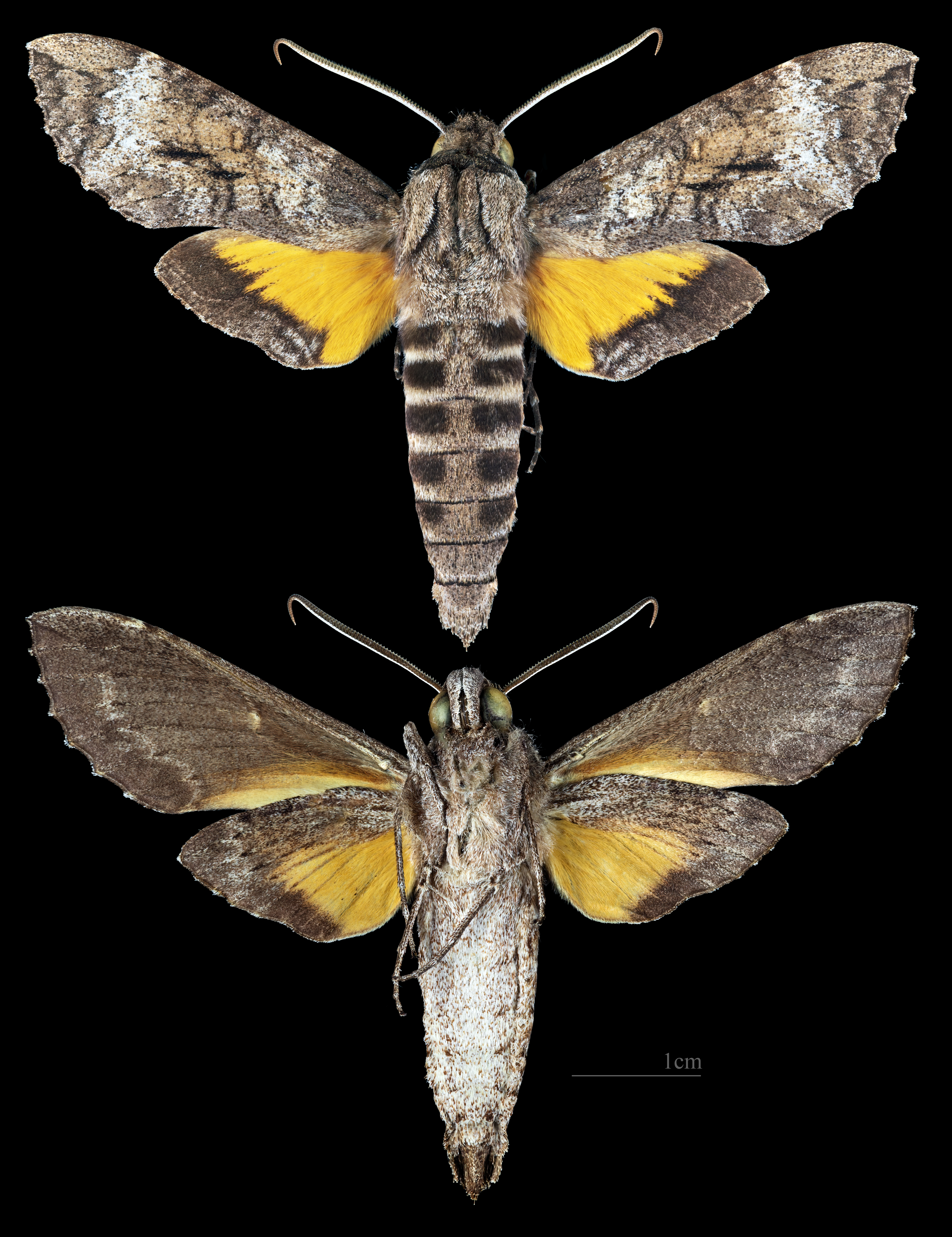
Isognathus australis

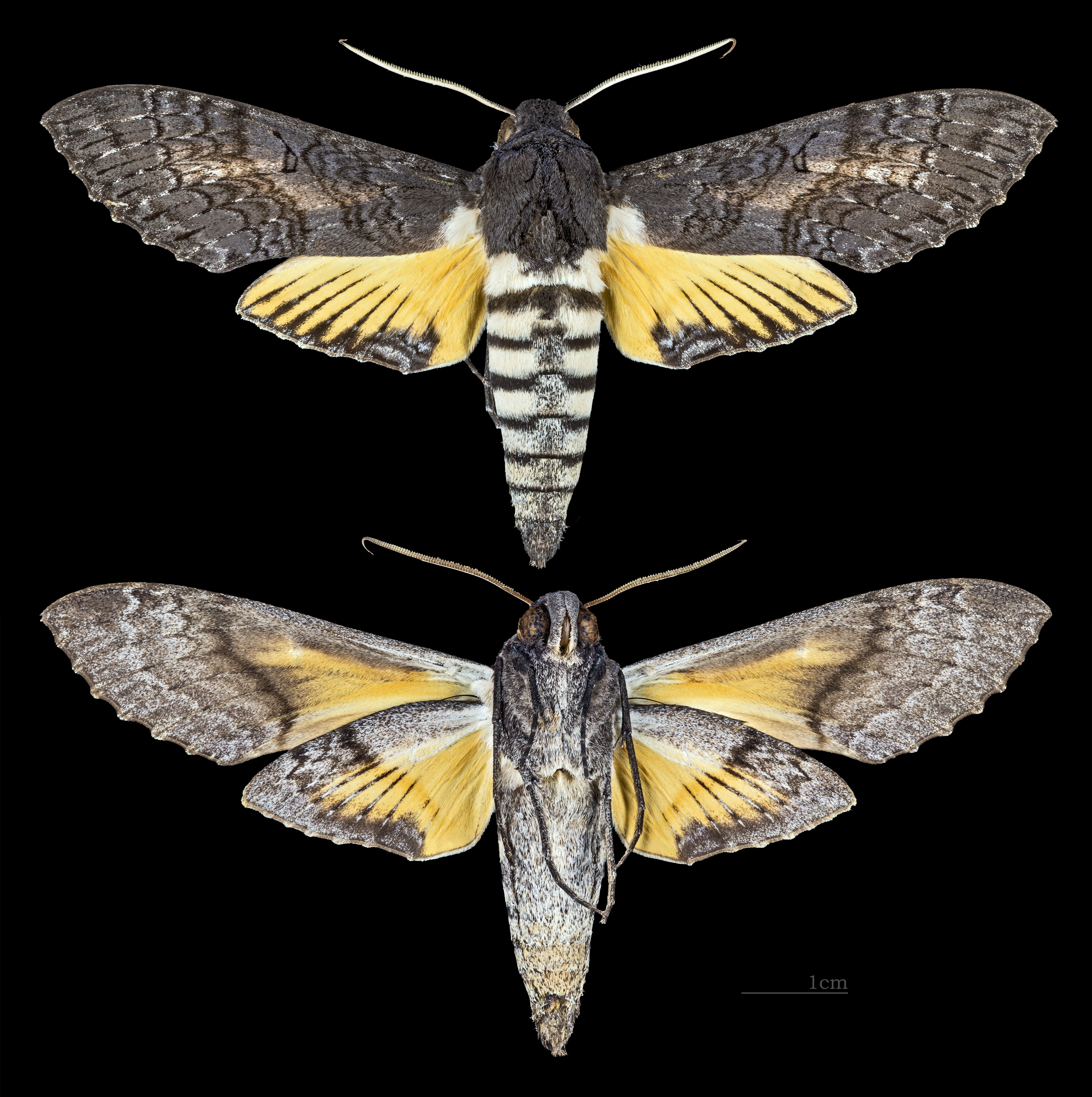
Isognathus caricae

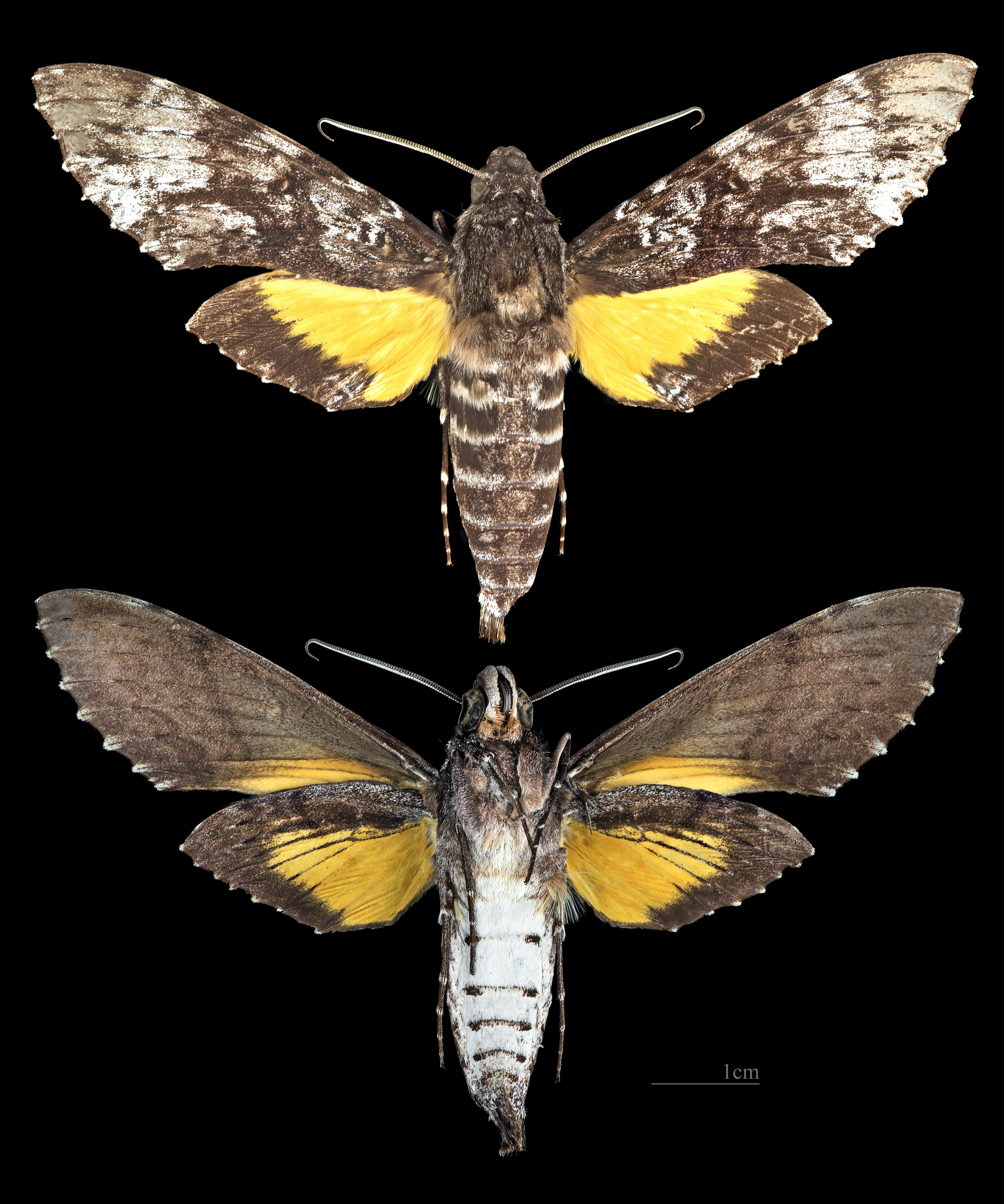
Isognathus excelsior

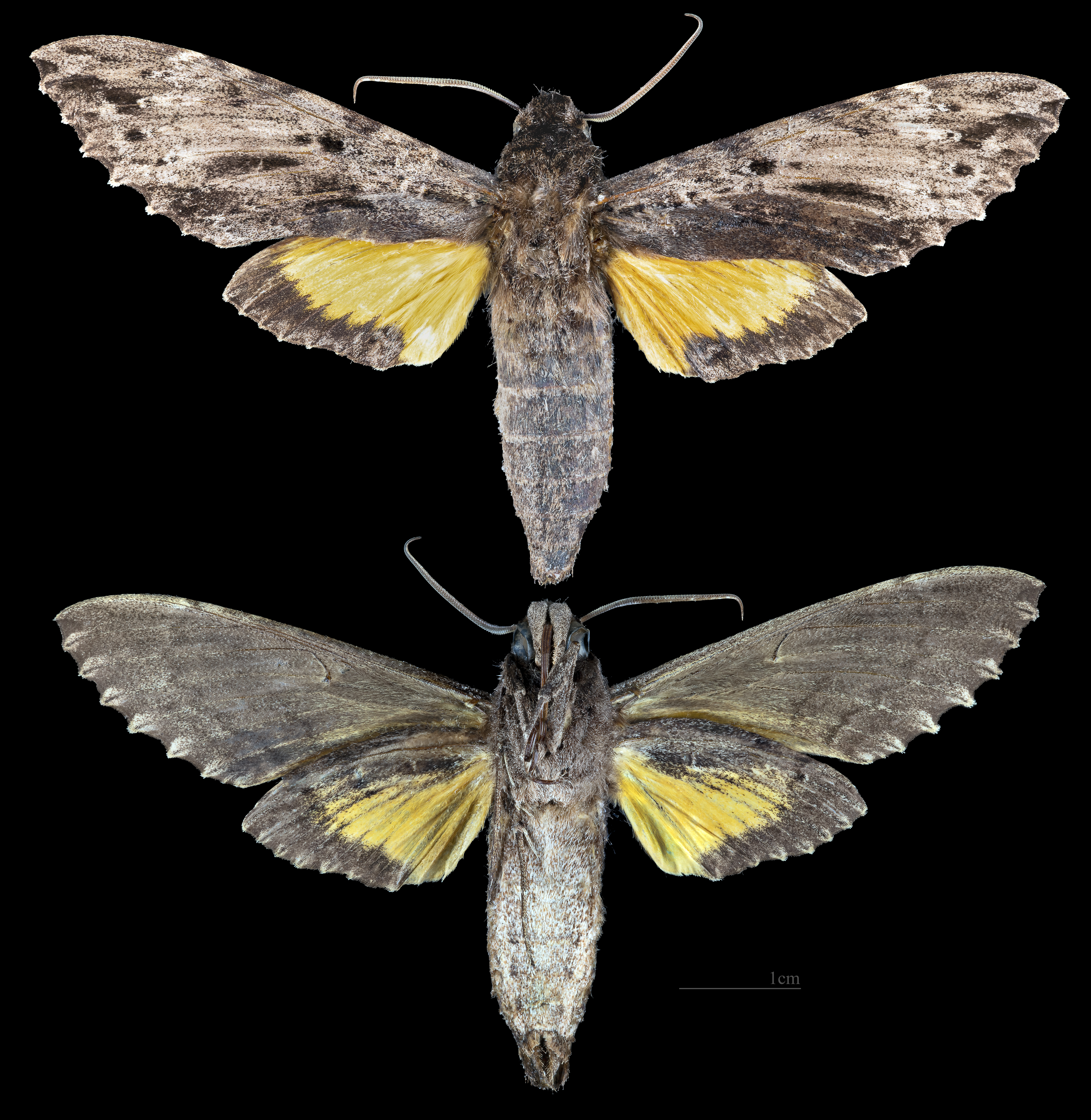
Isognathus leachii

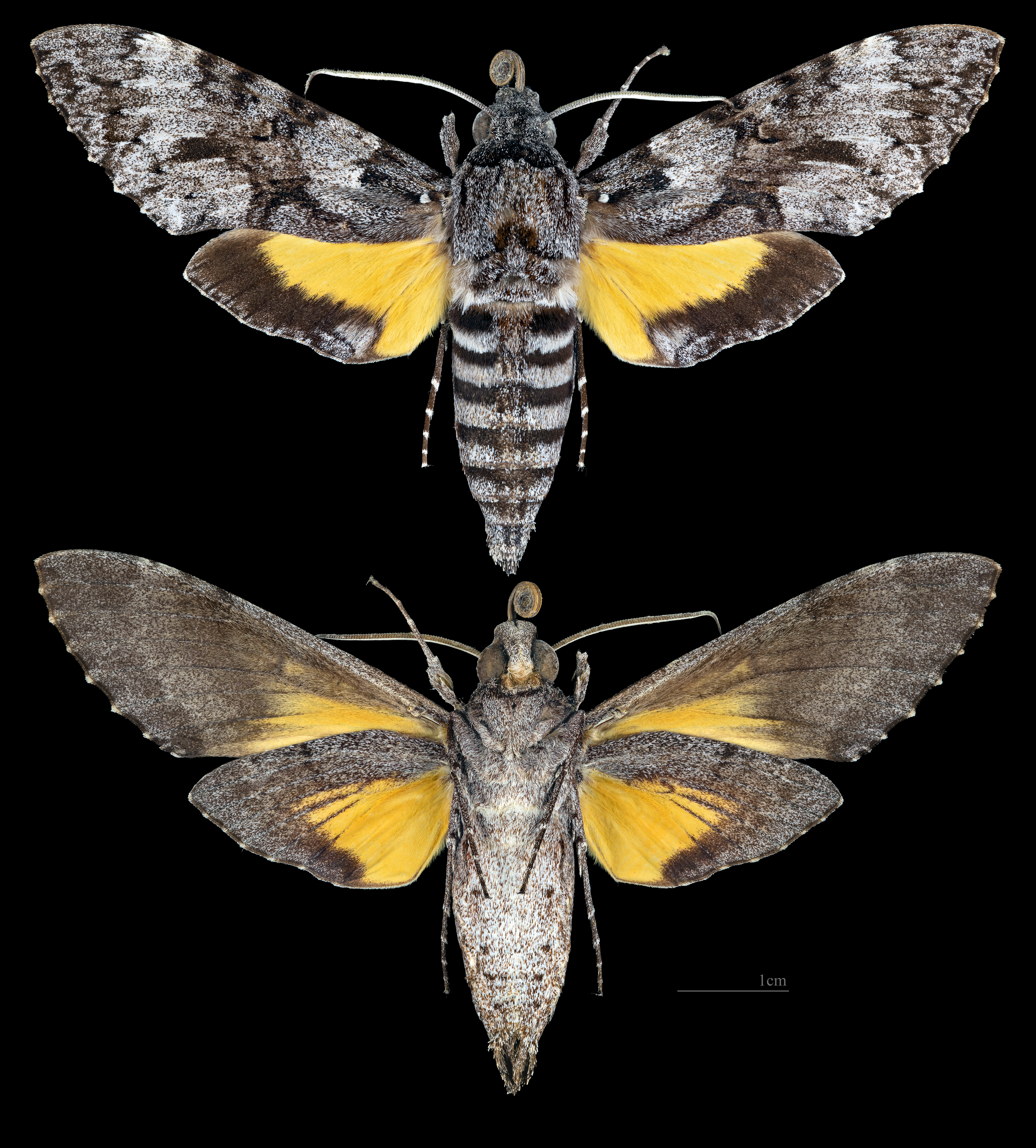
Isognathus menechus

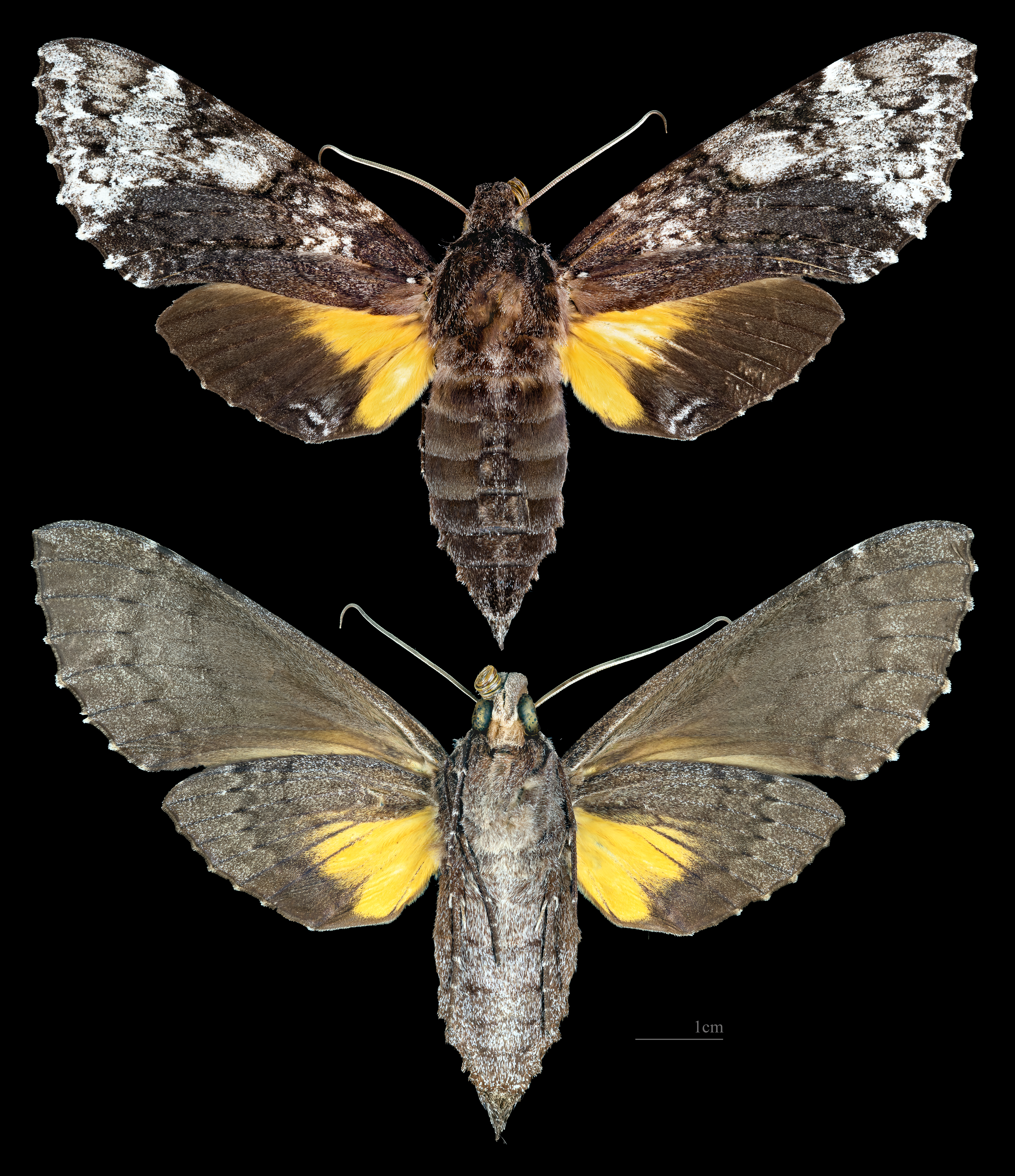
Isognathus occidentalis

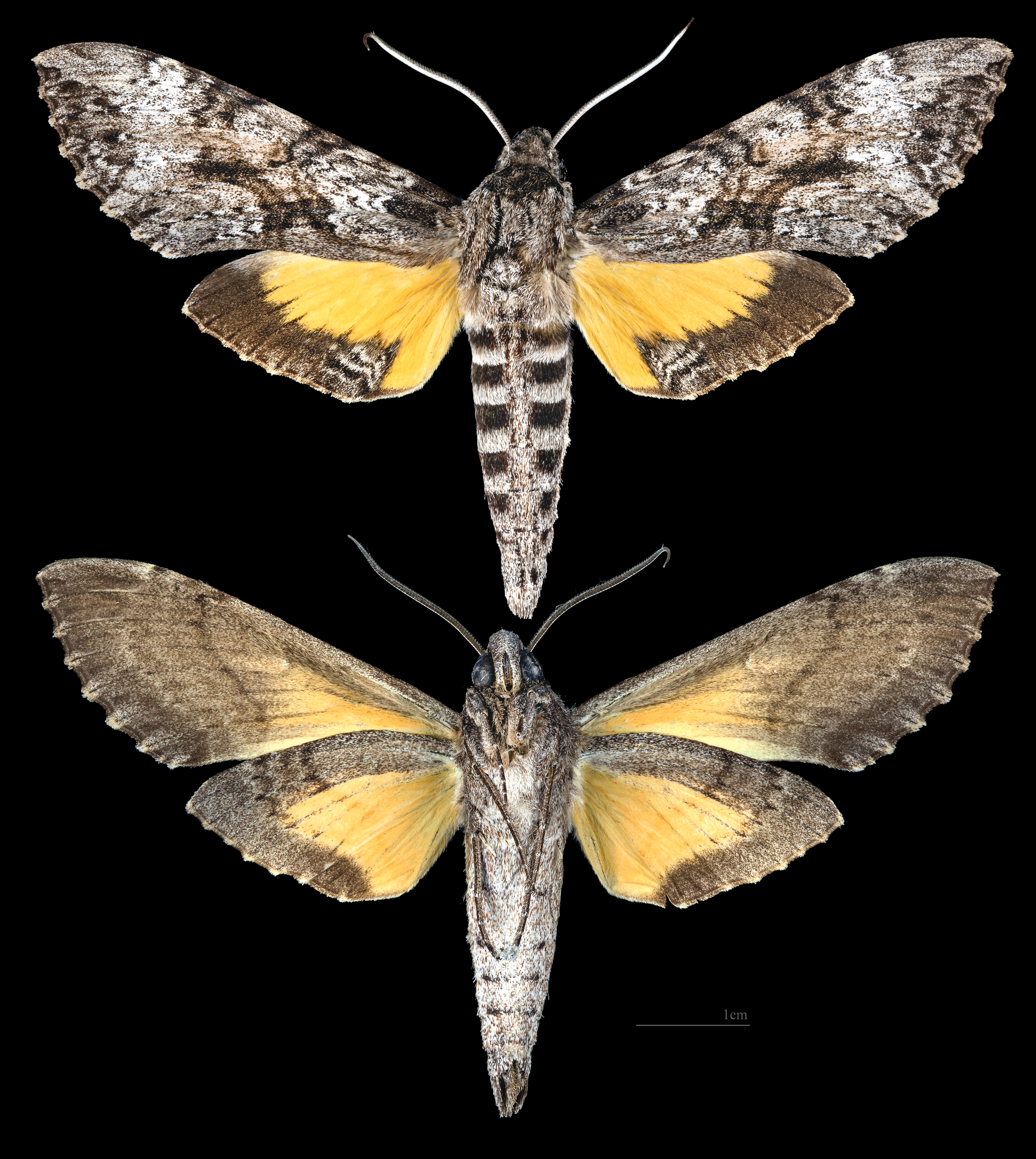
Isognathus rimosa

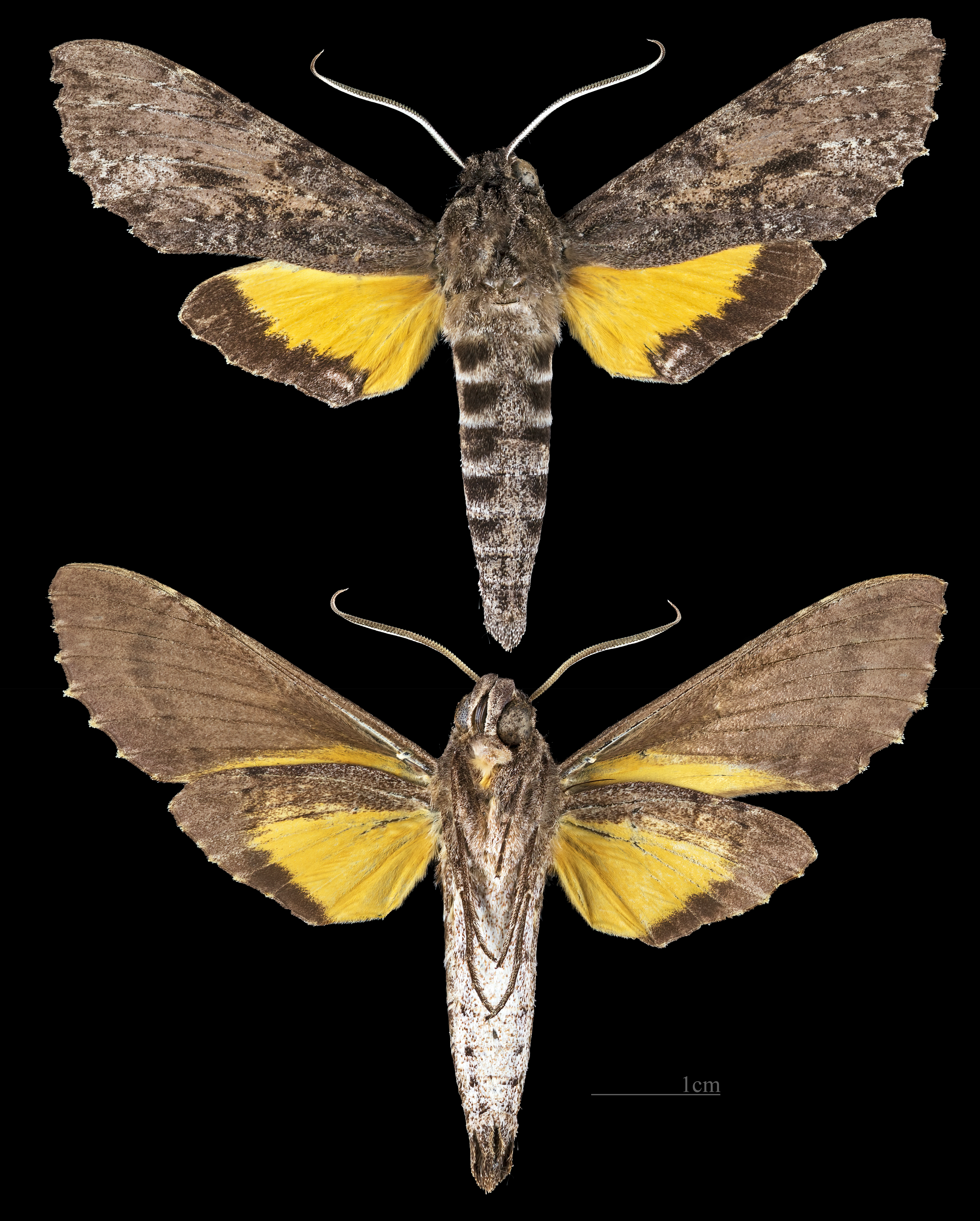
Isognathus scyron

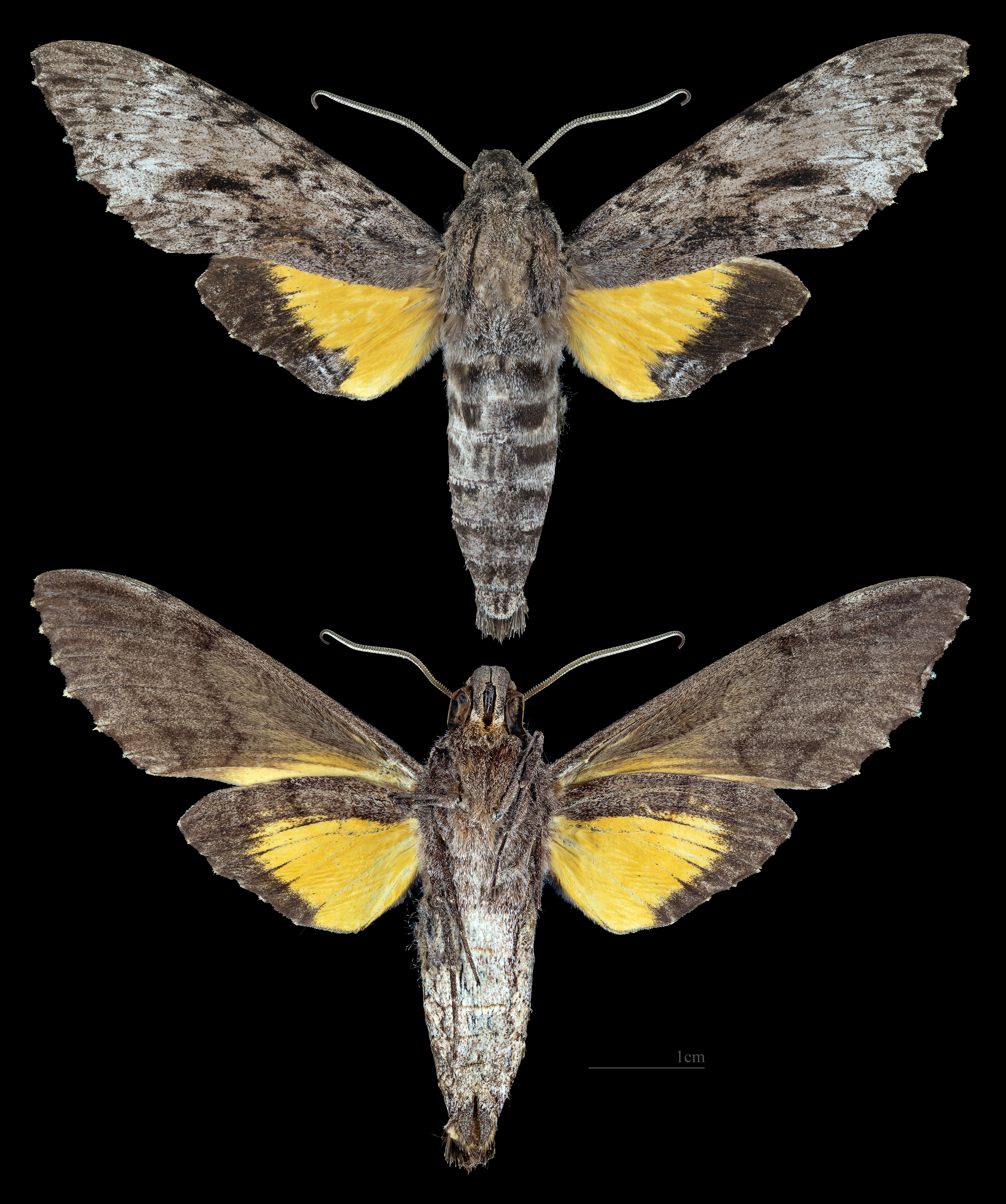
Isognathus swainsonii
