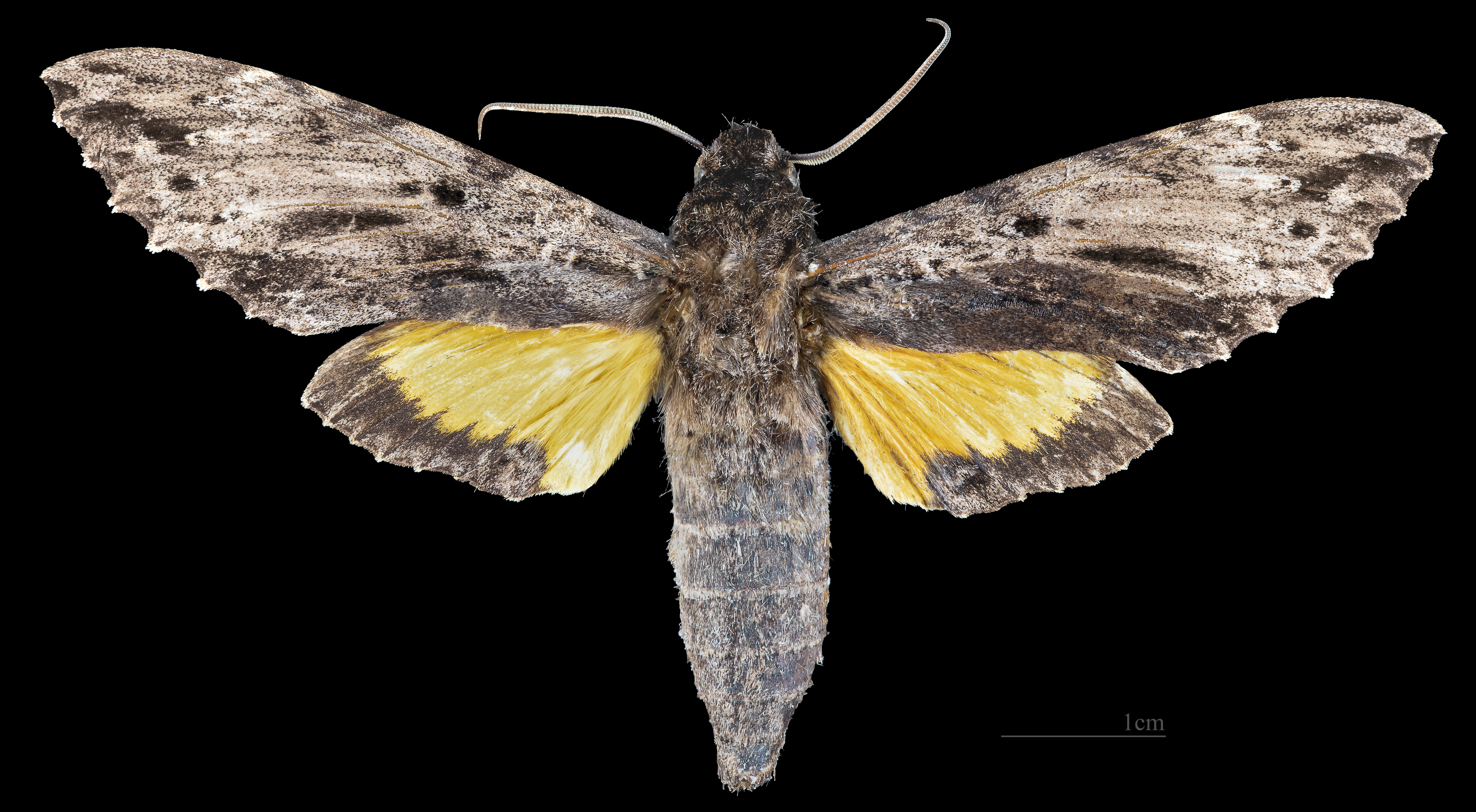
- Male dorsal
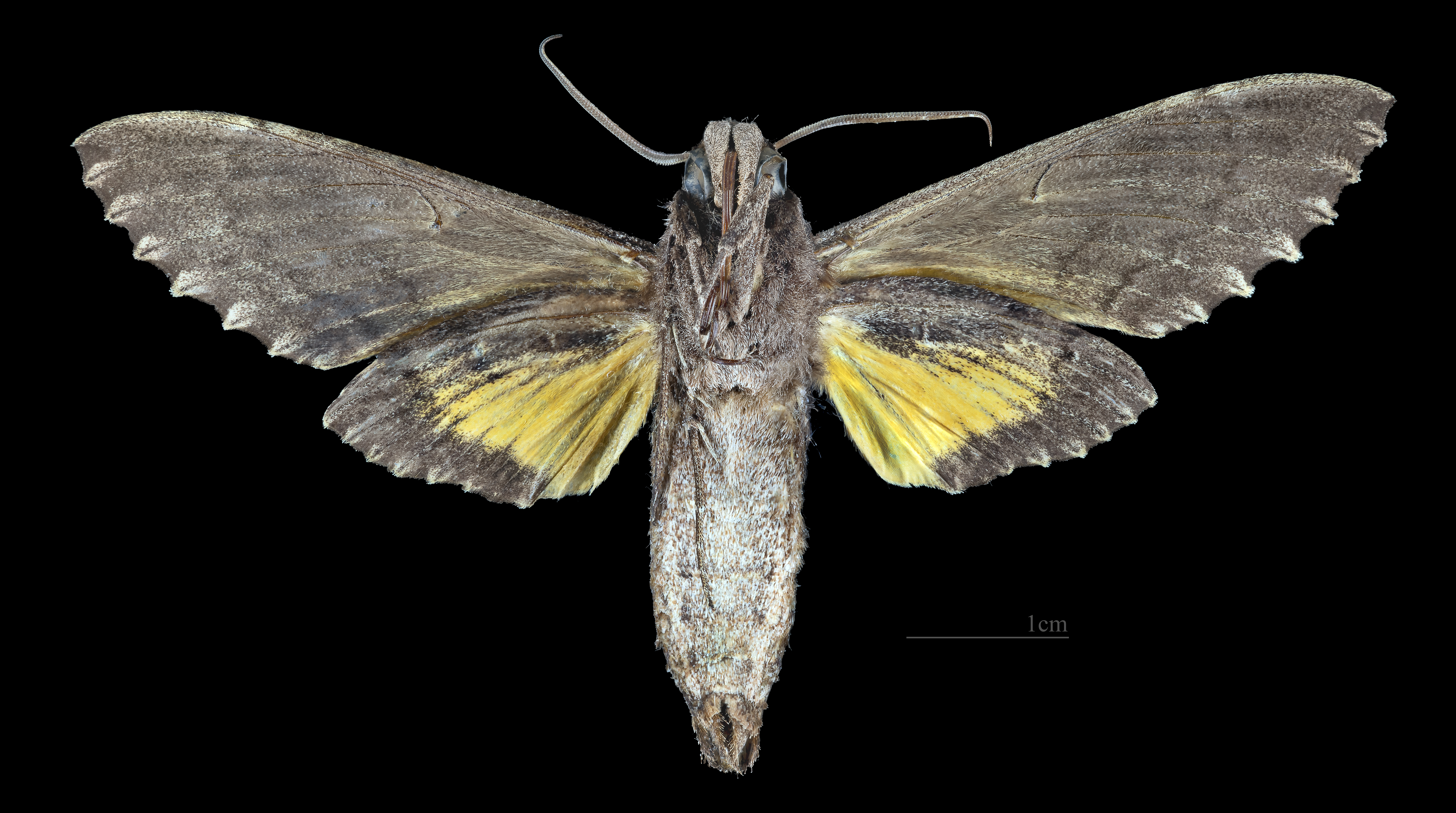
- Male ventral

Scientific classification
- Domain: Eukaryota
- Kingdom: Animalia
- Phylum: Arthropoda
- Class: Insecta
- Order: Lepidoptera
- Family: Sphingidae
- Genus: Isognathus
- Species: I. leachii

Binomial name
- Isognathus leachii (Swainson, 1823)

Synonyms
- Sphinx leachii Swainson, 1823; Isognathus metascyron Butler, 1875; Anceryx cahuchu Boisduval, 1875

= Isognathus leachii =

Species of moth

Isognathus leachii is a moth of the family Sphingidae.

== Distribution ==
It is known from southern Panama and from Colombia, Venezuela, Brazil, Ecuador, Bolivia and Argentina.

== Description ==
The wingspan is about 85 mm for males and 94 mm for females. There are indistinct bands on the upperside of the abdomen and an elongate patch on the forewing upperside. The inner edge of the dark brown marginal band of the hindwing upperside is distinctly and almost regularly dentate and not constant in width.

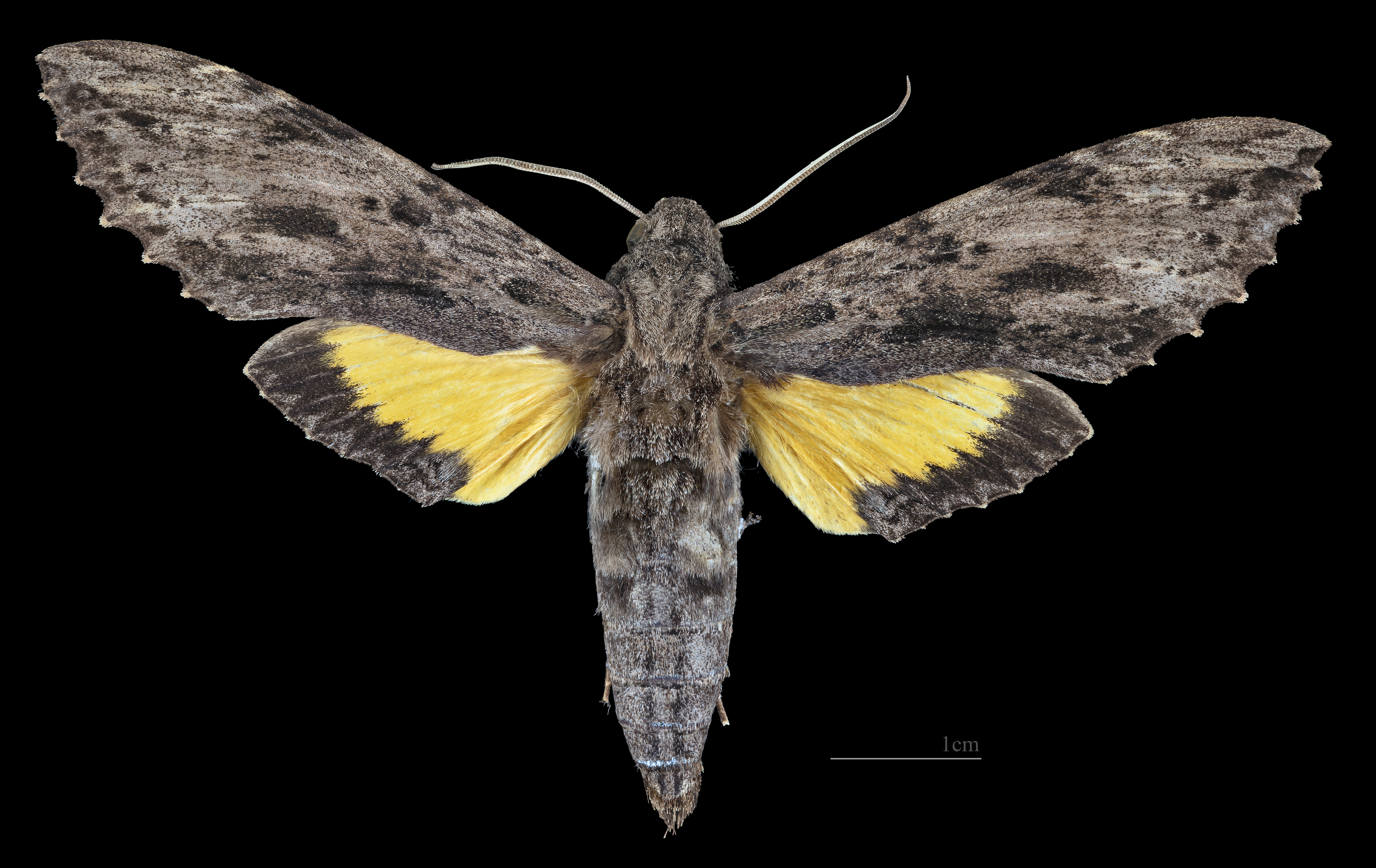
Female dorsal

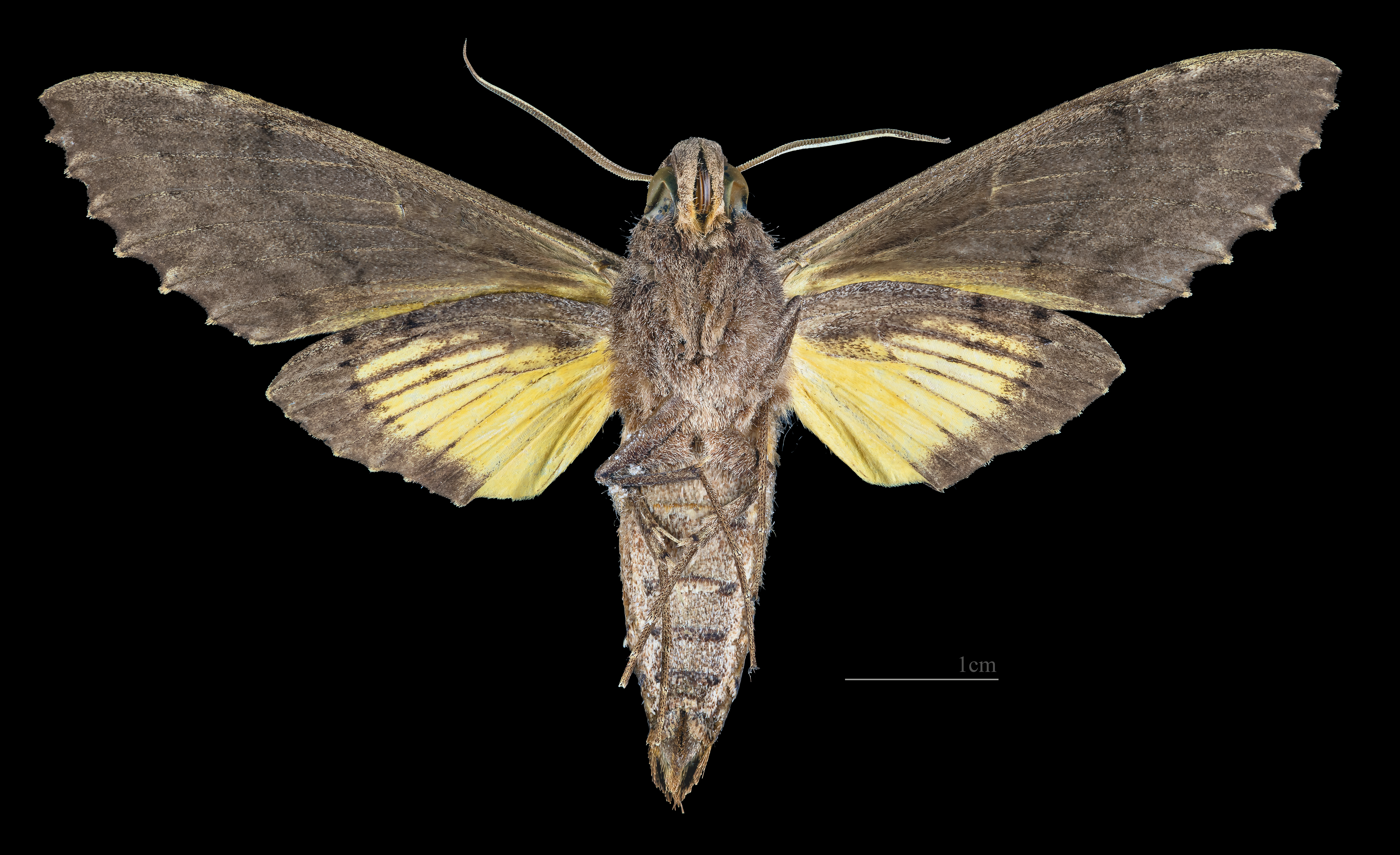
Female ventral

== Biology ==
There are probably multiple generations per year.

The larvae have been recorded feeding on Allamanda cathartica and Allamanda blancheti. They have long tails and are very colourful, suggesting they are unpalatable to birds.
