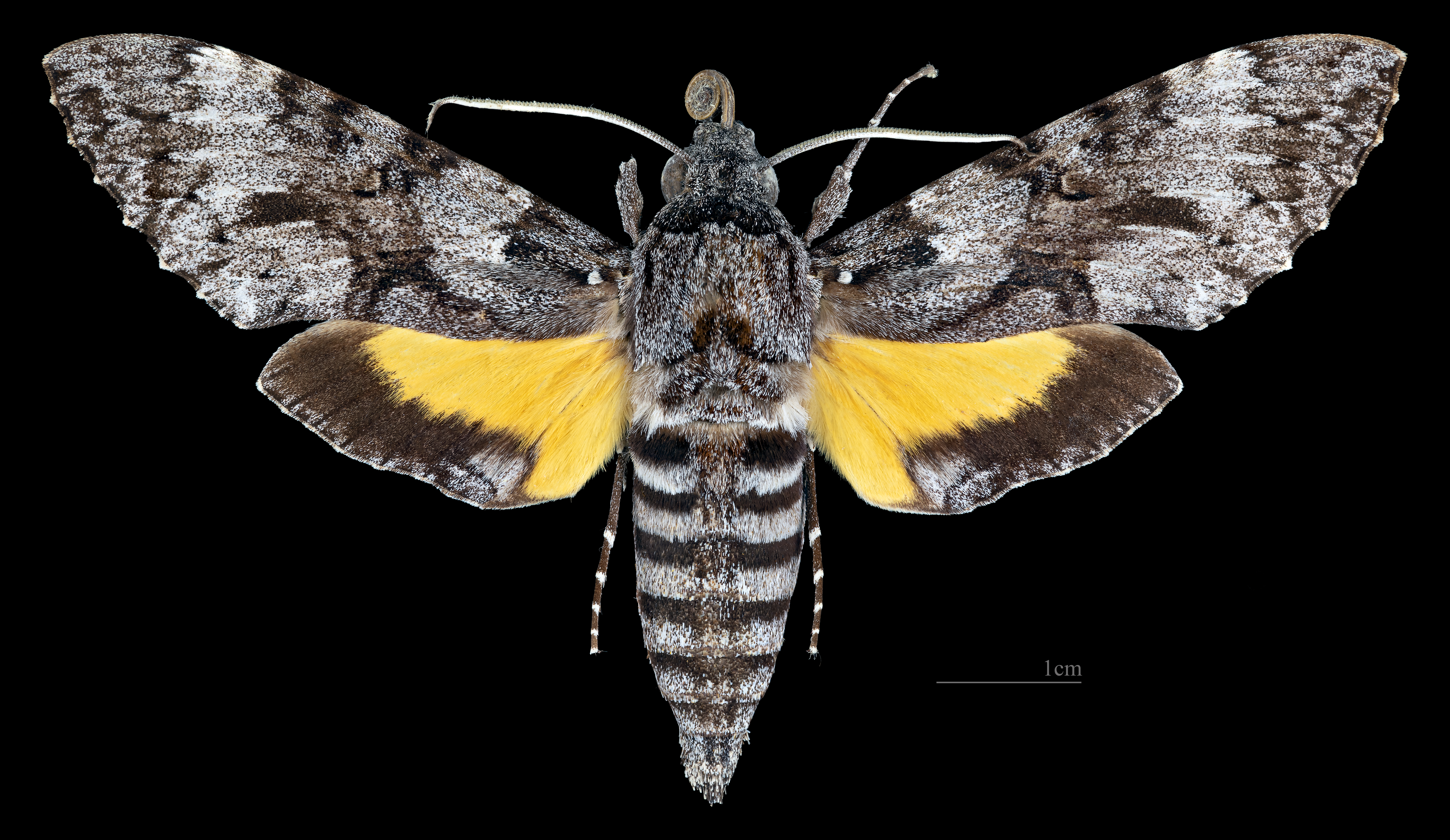
- Male dorsal
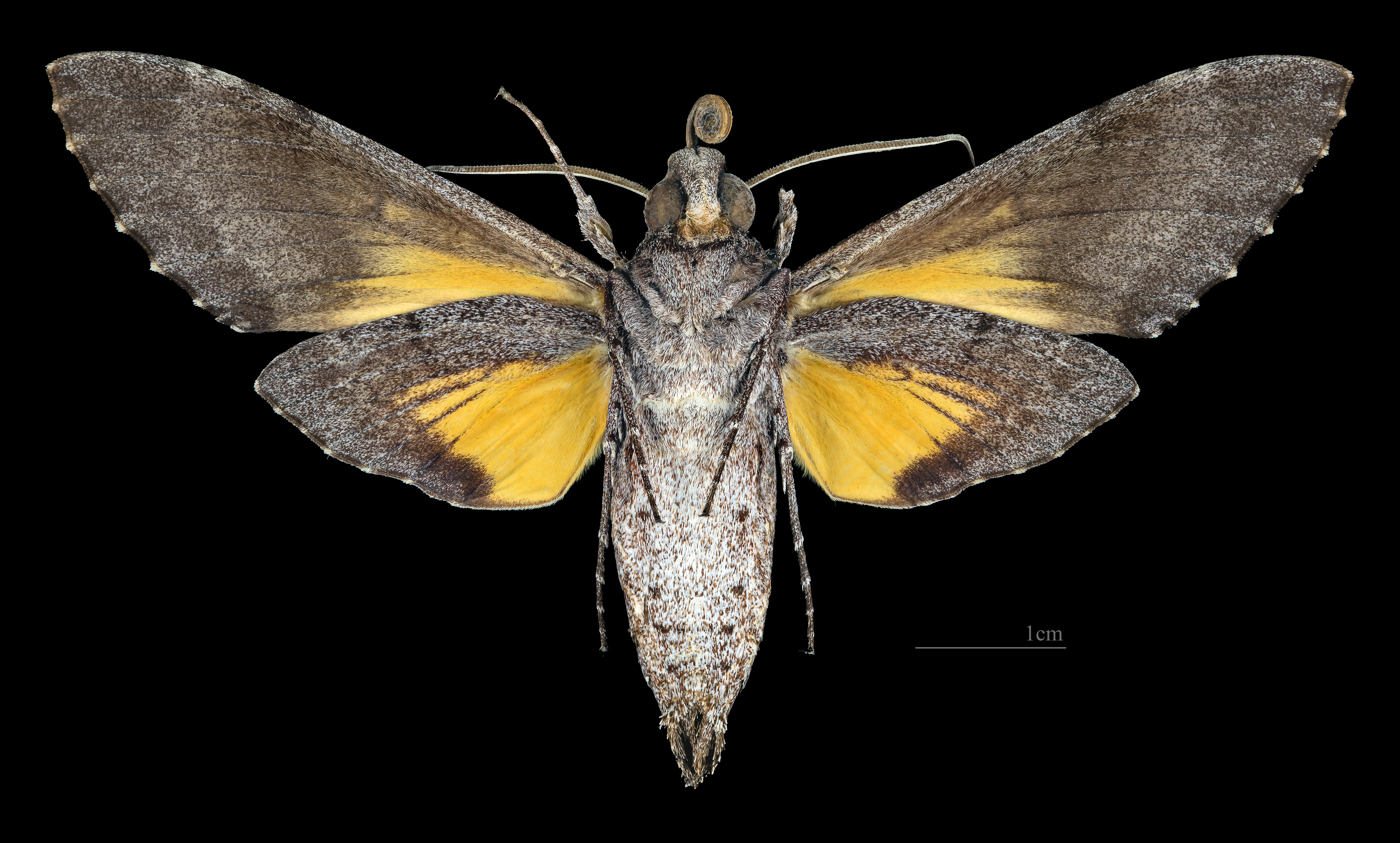
- Male ventral

Scientific classification
- Domain: Eukaryota
- Kingdom: Animalia
- Phylum: Arthropoda
- Class: Insecta
- Order: Lepidoptera
- Family: Sphingidae
- Genus: Isognathus
- Species: I. menechus

Binomial name
- Isognathus menechus (Boisduval, 1875)

Synonyms
- Anceryx menechus Boisduval, 1875; Sphinx mnechus Ménétriés, 1857; Isognathus amazonicus Butler, 1876

= Isognathus menechus =

Species of moth

Isognathus menechus is a moth of the family Sphingidae.

== Distribution ==
It is found from Cuba to Bolivia, Argentina and Brazil.

== Description ==
It is a heavy-bodied species.

== Biology ==
There are probably multiple generations per year.

The larvae have been recorded feeding on Himatanthus lancifolius.
