= 1540 in art =

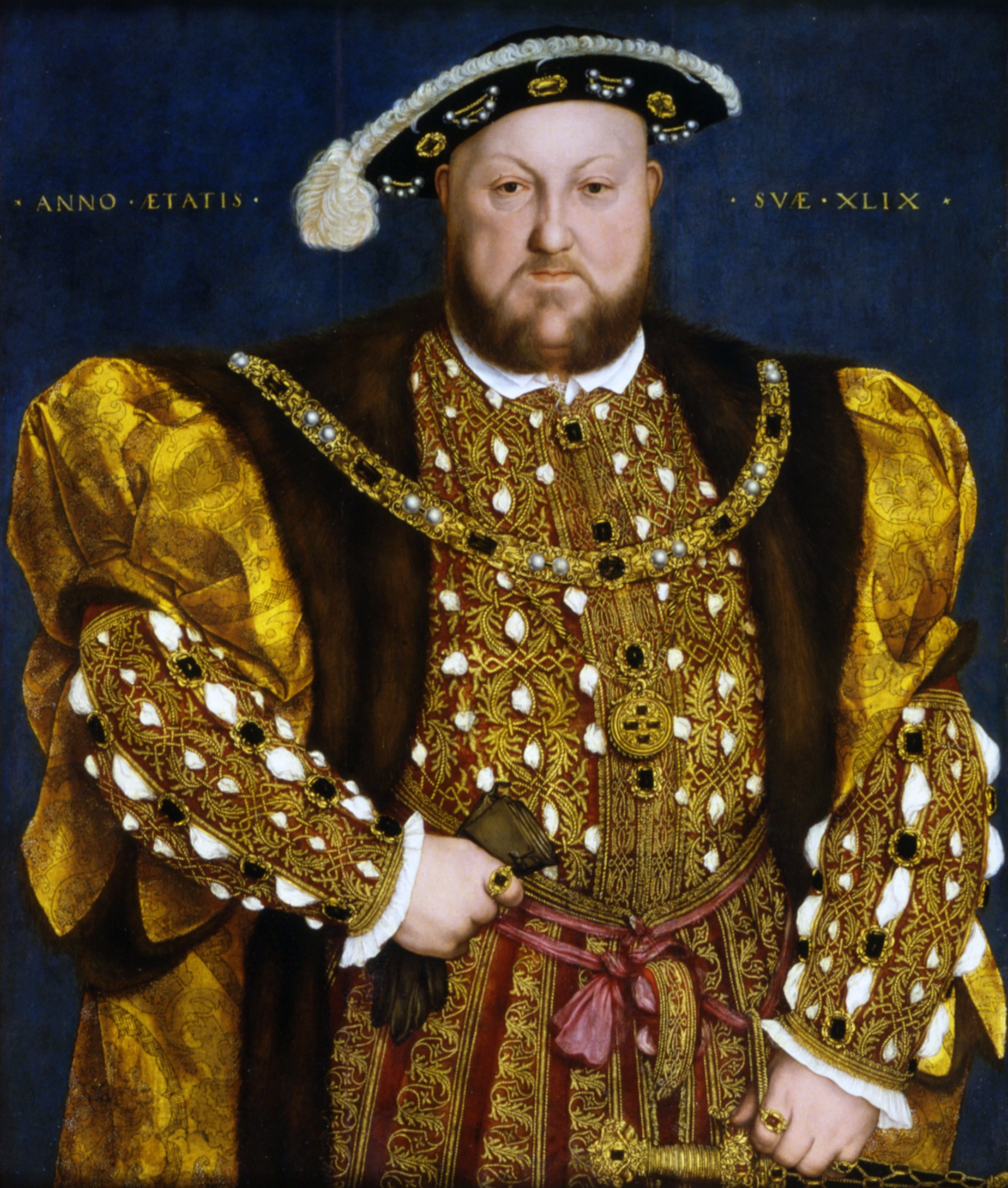
Hans Holbein the Younger's Portrait of Henry VIII was completed in 1540

Events from the year 1540 in art.

== Works ==
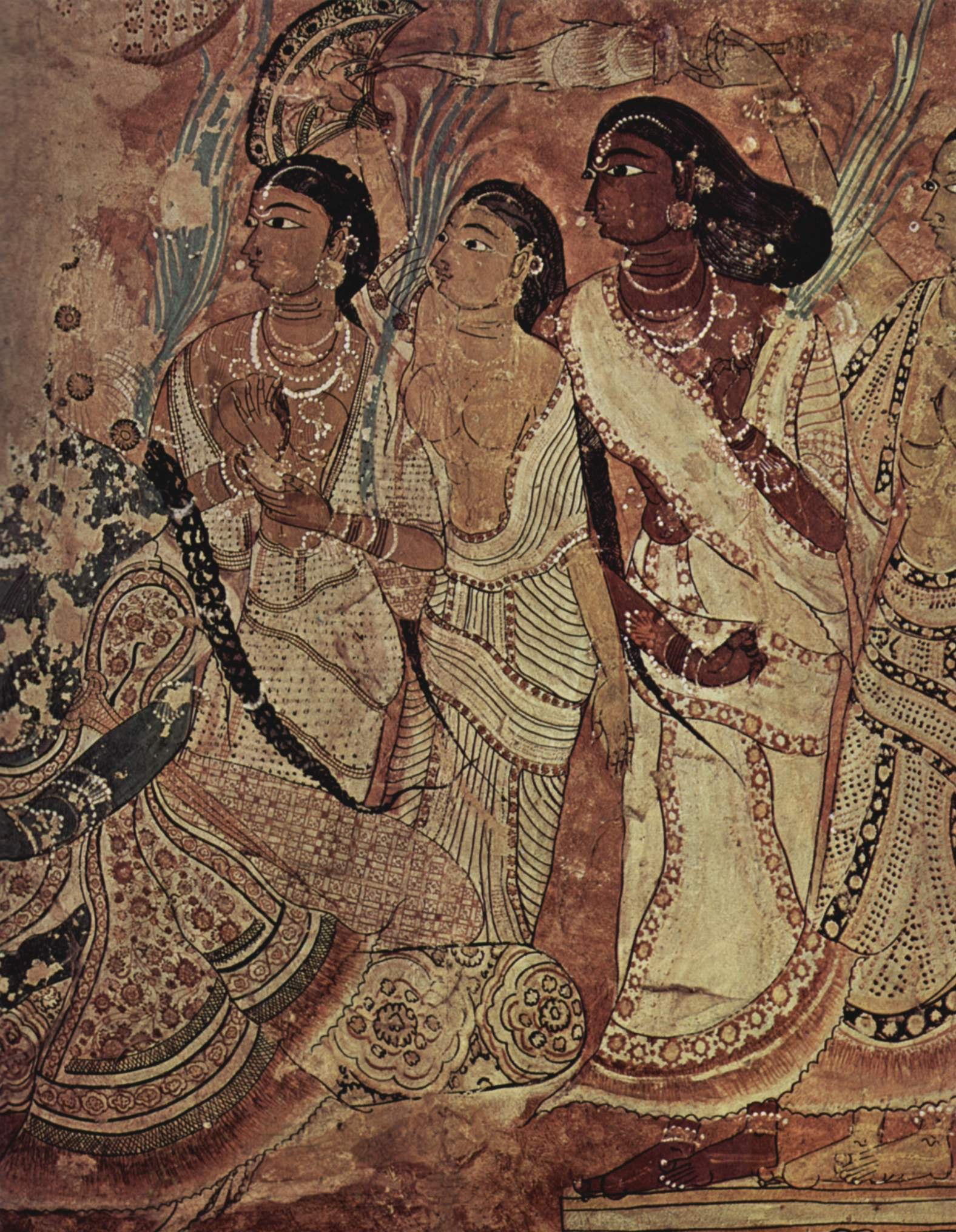
'Südindischer Meister', Group of Women, 1540

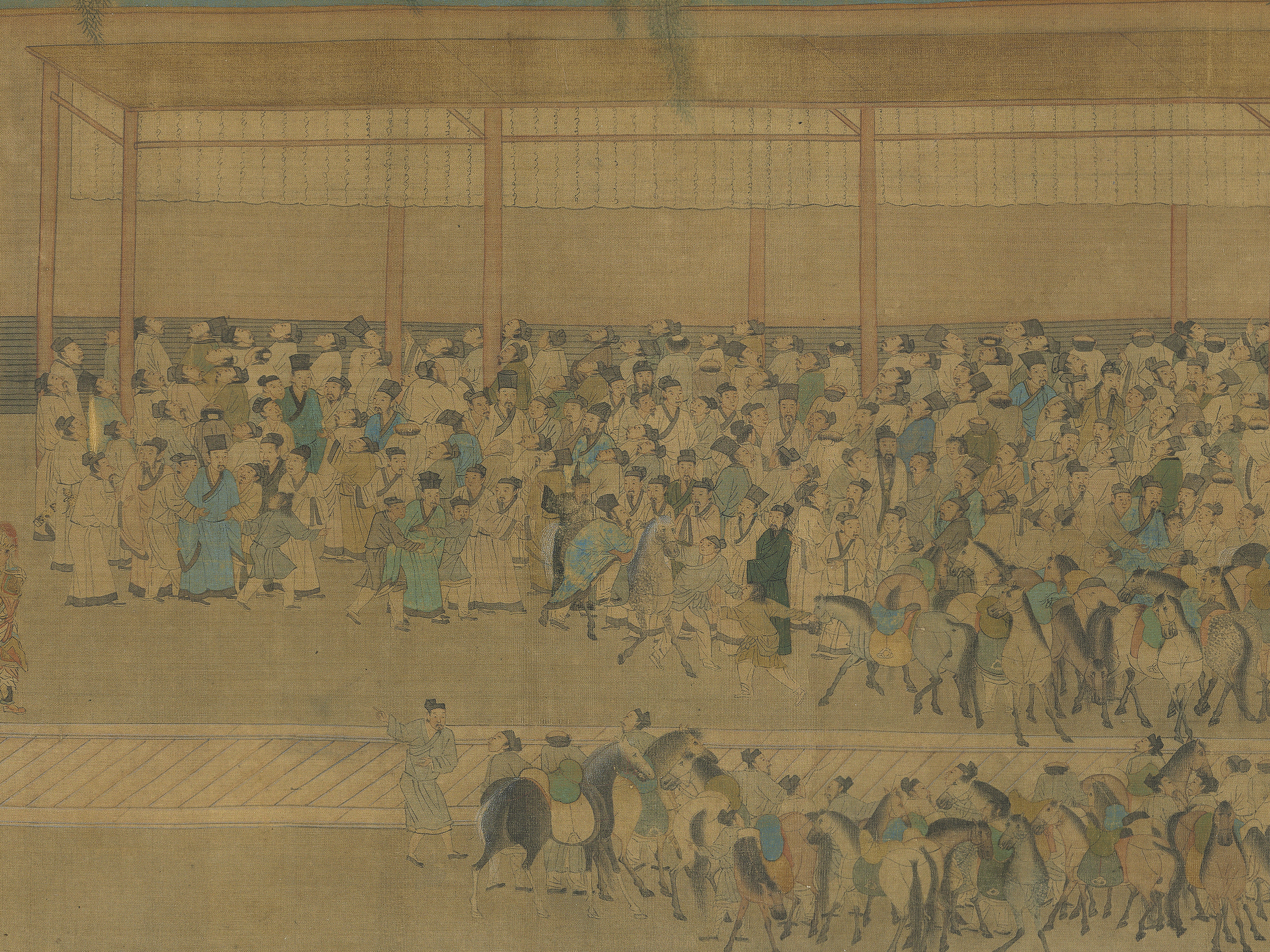
Qiu Ying, The Imperial examinations, 1540

- Ardabil Carpets
- Francesco de' Rossi – Rodolfo Pio da Carpi (approximate date)
- Hans Holbein the Younger
  - Portrait of Henry VIII (Galleria Nazionale d'Arte Antica, approximate date)
  - Miniature Portrait of Catherine Howard
- Michelangelo – Brutus (carved bust, approximate date)
- 'Südindischer Meister' – Group of Women
- Titian - Portrait of Benedetto Varchi (c.)
- Qiu Ying – The Imperial examinations

== Births ==
- December 21 - Thomas Schweicker, disabled German painter and calligrapher (died 1602)
- date unknown
  - Robert Adams, English architect, engraver and surveyor of buildings to Queen Elizabeth (died 1595)
  - Giovanni Anastasi, Italian painter (died 1587)
  - Andrea Andreani, Italian wood engraver and early exponent of chiaroscuro (died 1623)
  - Giovanni Maria Butteri, Italian fresco painter (died 1606)
  - Denis Calvaert, Flemish painter (died 1619)
  - Cristoforo Coriolano, German engraver of the Renaissance (died unknown)
  - Cristóbal de Acevedo, Spanish painter, active mainly during the Renaissance period (died unknown)
  - Annibale Fontana, Italian sculptor and medallist (died 1587)
  - Hieronymus Francken I, Flemish painter (died 1610)
  - Pieter Pietersz the Elder, Dutch painter (died 1603)
  - Friedrich Sustris, Italian-born Dutch painter working in Bavaria (died 1599)
- probable
  - Étienne Dumonstier, French Renaissance portrait painter (died 1603)
  - George Gower, English portrait painter who became sergeant-painter to Queen Elizabeth I (died 1596)

== Deaths ==
- April 15 - Marguerite Scheppers, painter
- August 24 - Parmigianino, Italian Mannerist painter and printmaker (born 1503)
- November 15 - Rosso Fiorentino, Italian Mannerist painter, in oil and fresco (born 1494)
- date unknown
  - Jorge Afonso, Portuguese Renaissance painter (born 1470)
  - Barthel Beham, German engraver, miniaturist and painter (born 1502)
  - Vincenzo degli Azani, Italian painter (date of birth unknown)
  - Gregor Erhart, German sculptor, son of Michel Erhart (born 1470)
  - Damià Forment, Spanish sculptor (born 1480)
  - Giulio Raibolini, Italian painter (born 1487)
- probable
  - Hans Leonhard Schäufelein, German painter, designer, and wood engraver (born 1480)
  - Agostino Veneziano, Italian engraver (born 1490)
  - Cristóvão de Figueiredo, Portuguese Renaissance painter (date of birth unknown)
  - Joos van Cleve, Netherlandish painter (born 1480/1490)
  - Hans Springinklee, German wood-engraver (born 1490)
  - 1540/1547: Nicola da Urbino - Italian maiolica and ceramicist (born 1480)
