= 1606 in art =

Events from the year 1606 in art.

== Events ==
- May 29 – Caravaggio kills a young man in a brawl in Rome. Sentenced to beheading, he flees the city.

== Works ==
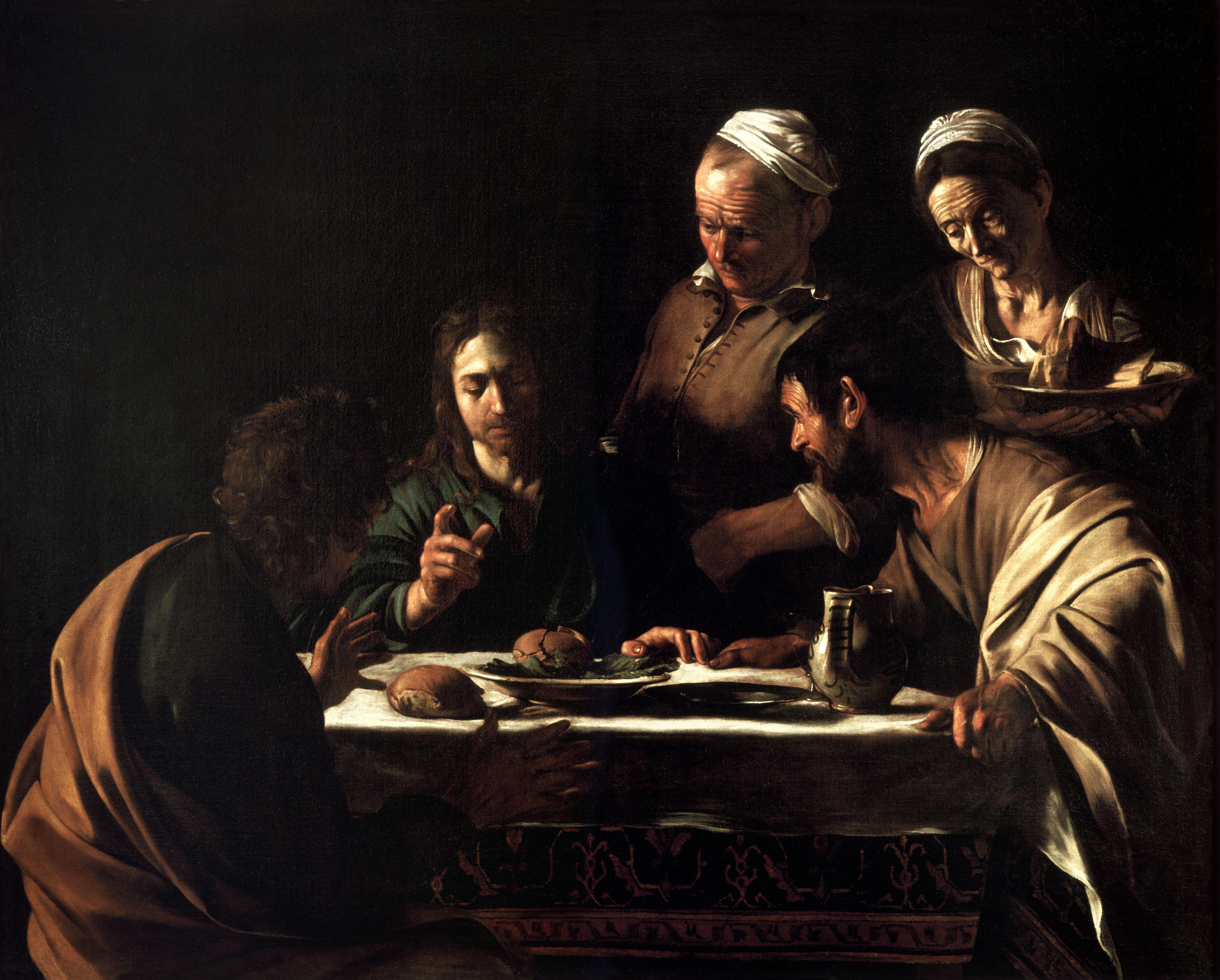
Caravaggio, Supper at Emmaus

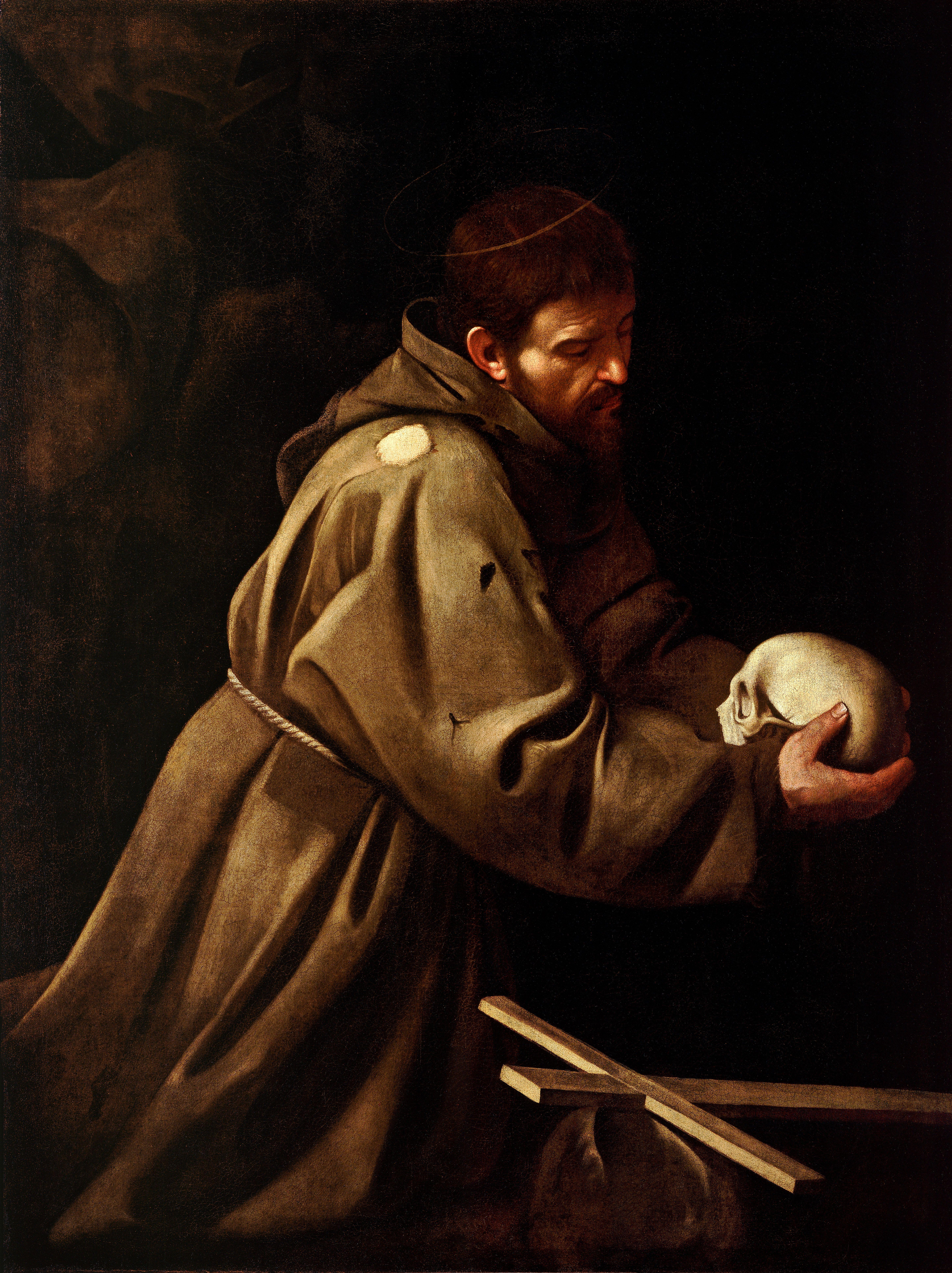
Caravaggio, Saint Francis in Prayer

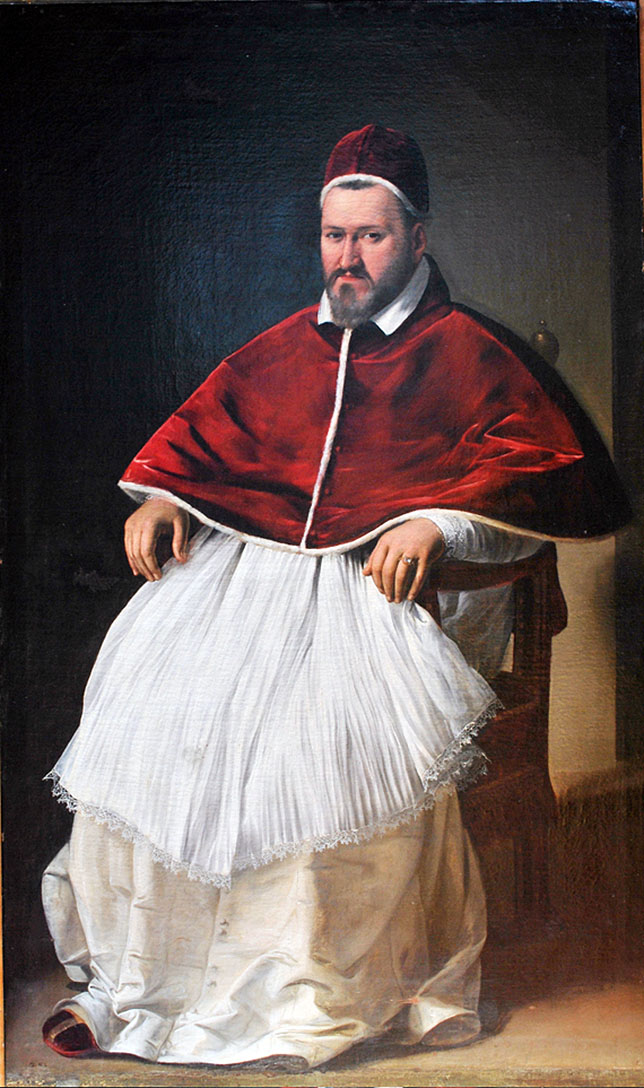
Caravaggio, Portrait of Pope Paul V

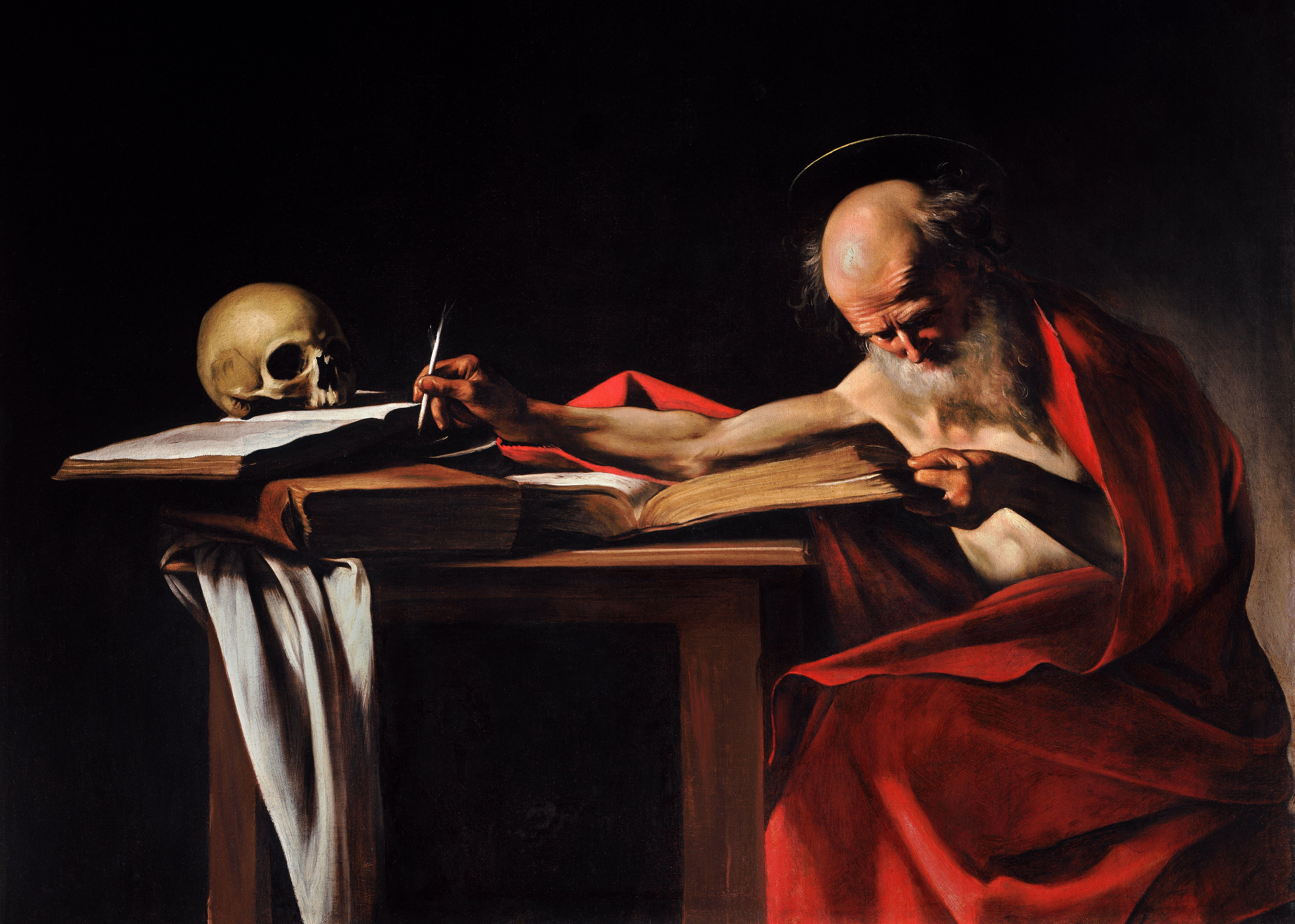
Caravaggio, Saint Jerome Writing

Caravaggio, Death of the Virgin

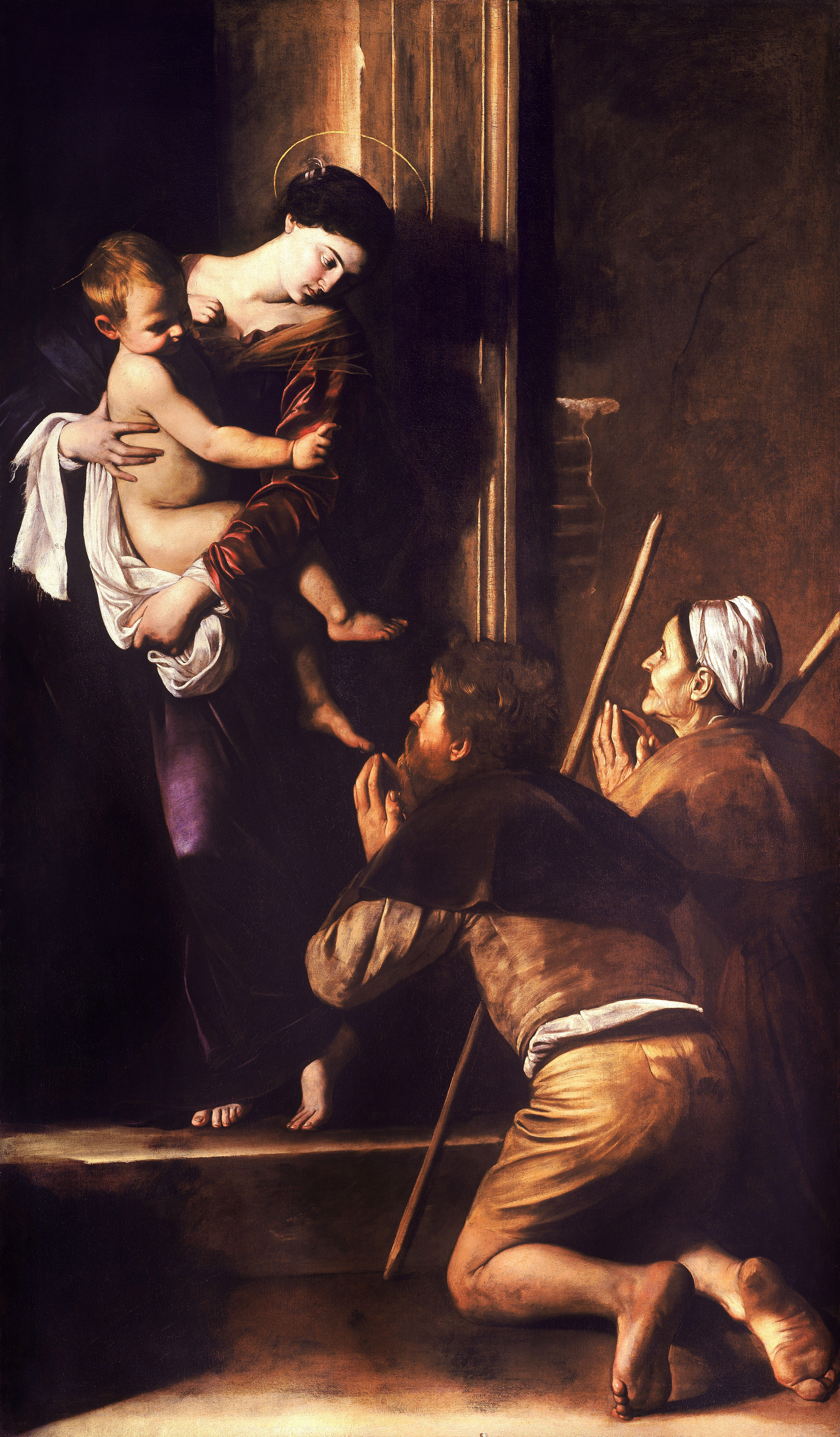
Caravaggio, Madonna di Loreto

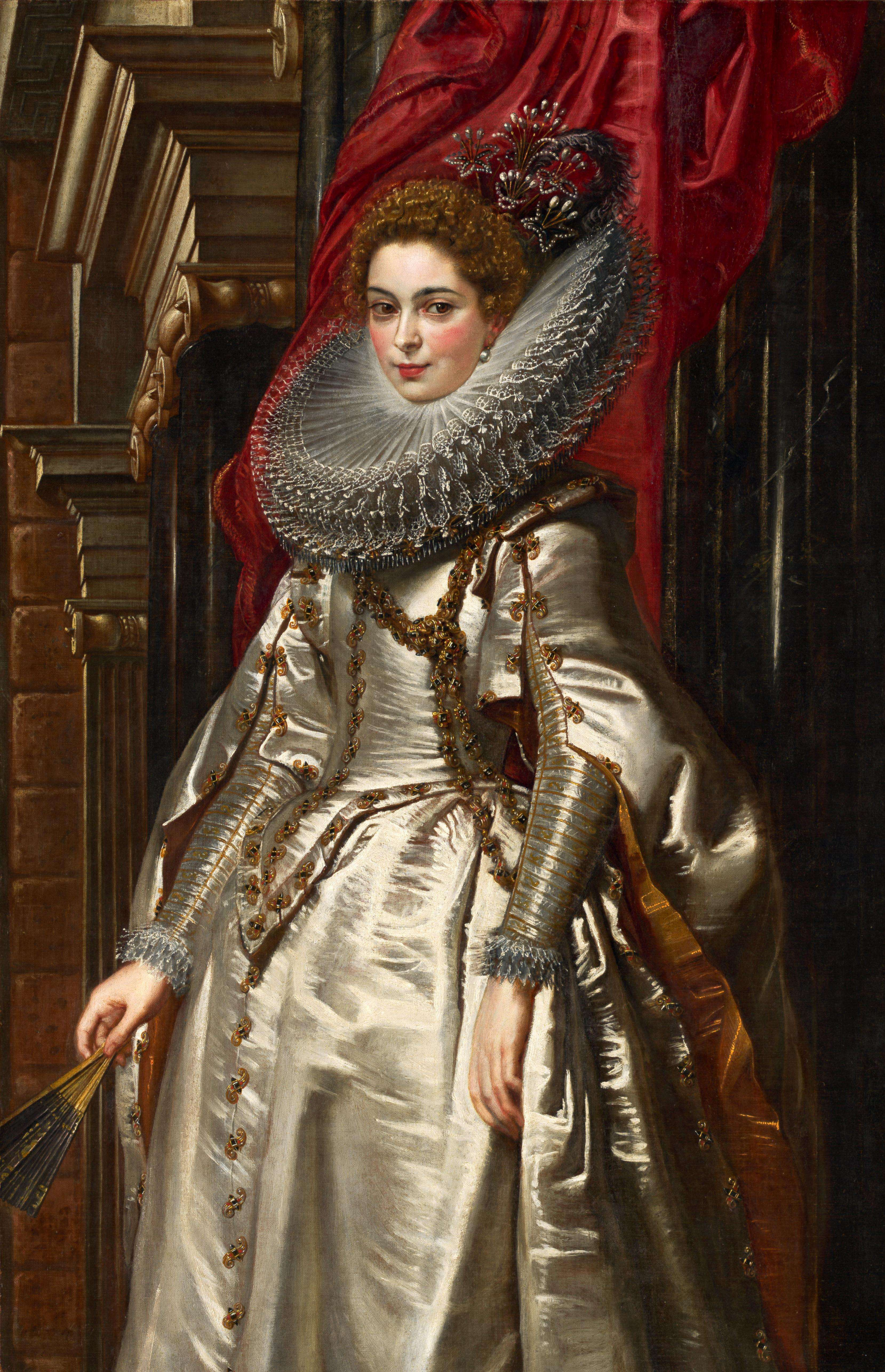
Rubens, Portrait of Marchesa Brigida Spinola-Doria
- Caravaggio
  - Death of the Virgin (1604-1606)
  - Madonna di Loreto (1604-1606)
  - Mary Magdalen in Ecstasy
  - Portrait of Pope Paul V (1605-1606)
  - Saint Francis in Prayer
  - Saint Jerome Writing
  - Supper at Emmaus (Pinacoteca di Brera, Milan)
- John de Critz (attrib.) – James VI and I (approximate date)
- Frans Francken the Younger – The Witches' Sabbath
- Peter Paul Rubens
  - The Judgement of Paris (approximate date)
  - Portraits of
    - Marchesa Brigida Spinola-Doria
    - Marchesa Maria Serra Pallavicino

== Births ==
- February 27 – Laurent de La Hire, French painter (died 1656)
- April – Jan Davidsz de Heem, Dutch painter (died 1683)
- May 3 – Lorenzo Lippi, Italian painter and poet (died 1664)
- May 12 – Joachim von Sandrart, German art-historian and painter (died 1688)
- July 15 – Rembrandt, Dutch painter (died 1669)
- date unknown
  - Theodoor van Thulden, Dutch artist from 's-Hertogenbosch in North Brabant (died 1669)
  - Charles Errard, French painter, architect and engraver (died 1689)
  - Giacinto Gimignani, Italian painter, active mainly in Rome, during the Baroque period (died 1681)
  - Giovanni Francesco Grimaldi, Italian architect and painter (died 1680)
  - Pieter Quast, Dutch painter (died 1647)
  - Pietro Ricchi, Italian painter of the altarpiece for a church in Lucca (died 1675)
- probable
  - (born 1606/1611): Viviano Codazzi, Italian painter of landscapes or vedute (died 1672)
  - (born 1606/1608): Johannes Bosschaert, member of the Bosschaert family of still life painters (died 1628/1629)
  - Joan Carlile, née Palmer, English professional portrait painter (died 1679)
  - Isaack Gilsemans, Dutch merchant and artist (died 1646)
  - Anthonie Jansz. van der Croos, Dutch painter (died 1661)

== Deaths ==
- August 6 – Ottaviano Nonni, Italian architect, sculptor, and painter (born 1536)
- September 2 – Karel van Mander, Flemish painter, poet and biographer (born 1548)
- date unknown
  - Tiziano Aspetti, Italian sculptor (born c.1557/1559)
  - Andrea Boscoli, Florentine painter (born c.1550/60)
  - Giovanni Maria Butteri, Italian painter primarily of frescoes (born 1540)
  - Alessandro Casolano, Italian painter primarily working in Siena (born 1552)
  - Giovanni Battista Fiammeri, Florentine Jesuit painter (born 1530)
  - Lodovico Leoni, Italian painter mainly active in Rome (born 1531)
  - Jan Vermeyen, Dutch goldsmith of the Renaissance Mannerism (born 1559)
- probable - Paolo Farinati, Italian painter of the Mannerist style (born 1524)
