= The Banquet of the Rich Glutton =

Painting by Mattia Preti

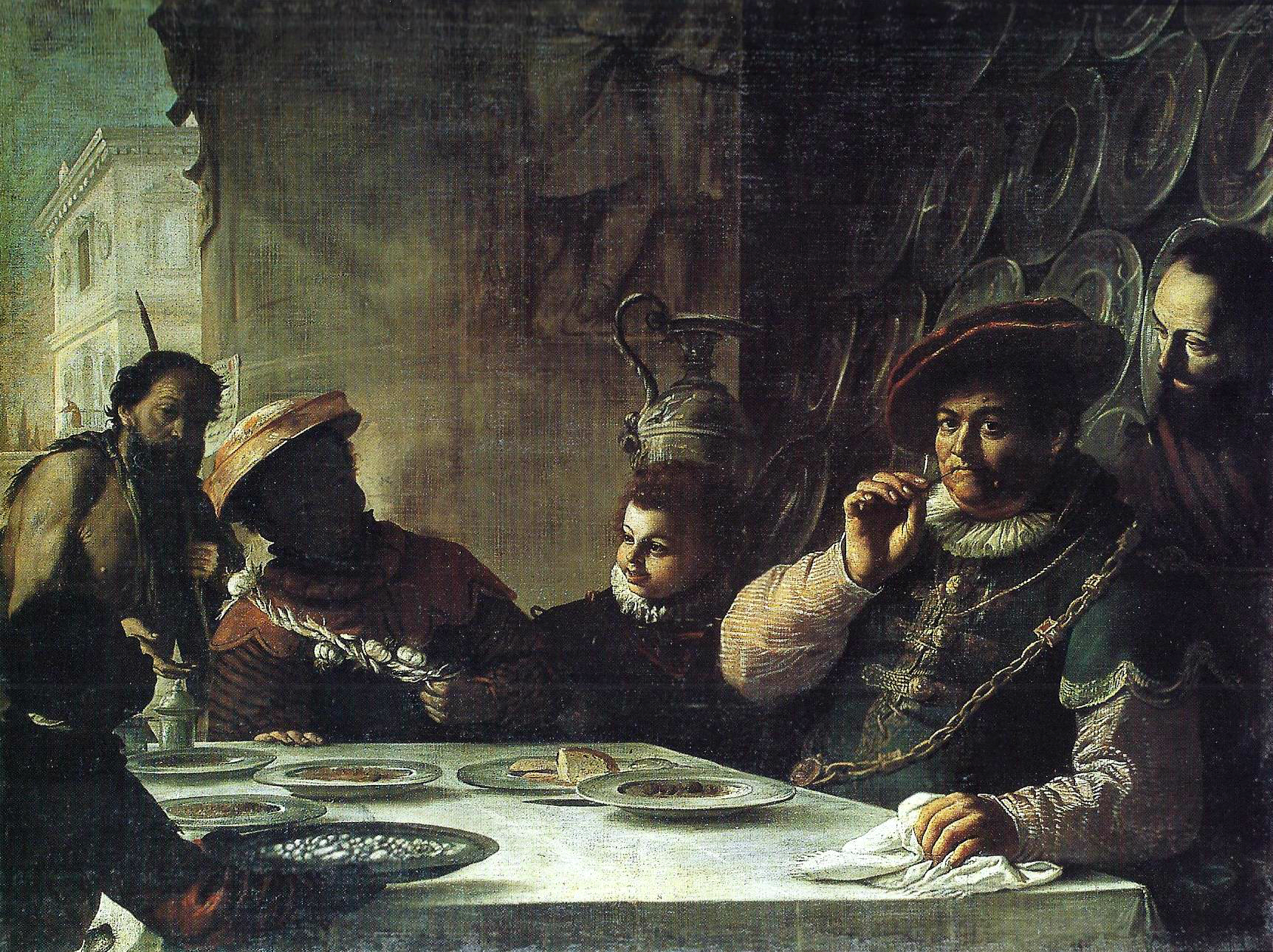
- Artist: Mattia Preti
- Year: c. 1665
- Medium: Oil on canvas
- Dimensions: 148 cm × 200 cm (58 in × 79 in)
- Location: Galleria Nazionale d'Arte Antica; Rome

The Banquet of a Rich Glutton is an oil on canvas painting by the Italian Baroque painter Mattia Preti, executed c. 1665. It is housed in the Pinacoteca of the Galleria Nazionale d'Arte Antica (Palazzo Barberini), in Rome.

== Description ==
The painting was likely commissioned by Antonio Caputo, a Neapolitan merchant from Preti during his stay in Naples. It was likely a companion piece to the Banquet of Absalom now hanging in the Museo di Capodimonte.

The subject of this painting derives from the parable of the rich man and Lazarus found in the gospel of Luke 16: 19–31. The name Epulone has been attached in Italy to the rich man, but also generically refers to a feaster (with pejorative gluttonous suggestion). The etymology of the word comes from a banquet sometime prepared in honor of the gods. The painting depicts a rich man after completion of his meal, with empty plates, surrounded by servants, while in the background, is the beggar Lazarus.

The painting was purchased in 1895 from a Monte di Pietà, where such a painting would have resonated as both a memento mori and counsel towards charity. The painting would have been thematically antithetical to the still life works depicting a cornucopia of a contemporary rich man's kitchen.
