= Scheppers =

Scheppers is a Dutch occupational surname. Literally meaning "creator's", it originally referred to a tailor. Notable people with the surname include:

- Marguerite Scheppers (? – 1540), Dutch painter
- Tanner Scheppers (born 1987), American baseball pitcher
- Victor Scheppers (1802 – 1877), Flemish priest, founder of the Congregation of the Brothers of Scheppers and the Scheppersinstituut Mechelen

== See also ==
- De Schepper
- Scheepers
- Schepers
