= Portrait of Henry VIII =

Lost painting by Hans Holbein the Younger

- Artist: workshop of Hans Holbein the Younger
- Year: c. 1537
- Medium: Oil on panel
- Location: Walker Art Gallery, Liverpool

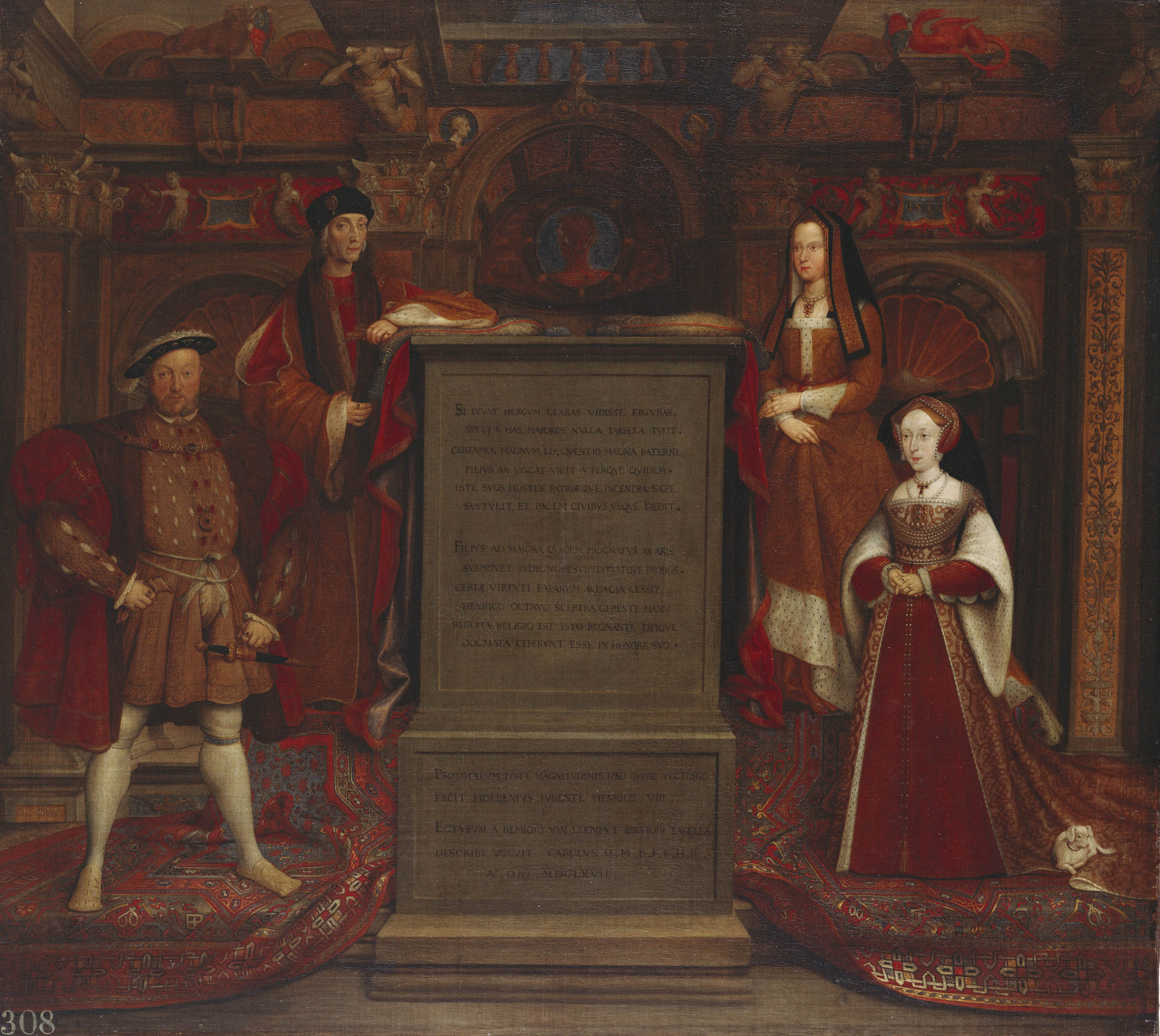
Copy in oils of the Whitehall Mural, commissioned by Charles II, 1667

Portrait of Henry VIII is a lost painting by Hans Holbein the Younger depicting Henry VIII. It is one of the most iconic images of Henry VIII and is one of the most famous portraits of any English or British monarch. It was created in 1536–1537 as part of the Whitehall Mural showing the Tudor dynasty at the Palace of Whitehall, Westminster, which was destroyed by fire in 1698, but is still well known through many copies.

== Description ==
Hans Holbein the Younger, originally from Germany, had been appointed the English King's Painter in 1536. The portrait was created to adorn the privy chamber of Henry's newly acquired Palace of Whitehall. Henry was spending vast sums to decorate the 23-acre (93,000 m^{2}) warren of residences he had seized after the downfall of Cardinal Wolsey. The original mural featured four figures arranged around a marble plinth: Henry, his wife Jane Seymour, and his parents, Henry VII and Elizabeth of York. The mural was thus commissioned sometime during the brief marriage of Henry and Jane Seymour and was completed in 1537. It may well have been commissioned to celebrate the coming or actual birth of Henry's long-awaited heir, Edward, born in October 1537. It is not clear where in the palace the mural was located, but it may have been in the king's Privy Chamber or study, where only a very select few would have seen it.

Henry is posed without any of the standard royal accoutrements such as a sword, crown, or sceptre. This was common in progressive royal portraiture of the period, for example the portraits by Titian of the Habsburg family and other royalty, and also French and German royal portraits. But Holbein's success in conveying royal majesty without such specific props is exceptional. The majestic presence is conveyed through Henry's aggressive posture, standing proudly erect, directly facing the viewer. His legs are spread apart, and arms held from his side in the pose of a warrior or a wrestler. In one hand he holds a glove, while the other reaches towards an ornate dagger hanging at his waist. Henry's clothes and surroundings are ornate, with the original painting using gold leaf to highlight the opulence. The detailed blackwork embroidery is especially notable. He wears an array of jewellery including several large rings and a pair of necklaces. His large codpiece and heavily padded shoulders further enhance the aggressive masculinity of the image.

The portrait has been called a work of propaganda, designed to enhance Henry's majesty. It deliberately skews his figure to make him more imposing. Comparisons of surviving sets of Henry's armour show that his legs were much shorter in reality than in the painting. The painting also shows Henry as young and full of health, when in truth he was in his forties and had been badly injured earlier in the year in a tiltyard accident. He was also already suffering from the health problems that would affect the latter part of his life.

Henry recognized the power of the image Holbein created, and encouraged other artists to copy the painting and distributed the various versions around the realm, giving them as gifts to friends and ambassadors. Major nobles would commission their own copies of the painting to show their loyalty to Henry. The many copies made of the portrait explain why it has become such an iconic image, even after the destruction of the original when Whitehall Palace was consumed by fire in 1698. It has had a lasting effect on Henry's public image. For instance, Charles Laughton's Oscar-winning performance in The Private Life of Henry VIII was modelled after the swaggering Henry depicted by Holbein.

== Surviving images ==
A full-size cartoon done by Holbein in preparation for the portrait group survives in the collection of the National Portrait Gallery, showing only the left-hand third of the group, with the two Henrys. This was used to make an outline of the design on the wall, by pricking holes along the main lines and pushing powdered soot through. The cartoon differs slightly from the final version. Most notably it shows Henry standing in a more traditional three-quarters view rather than the final and iconic head-on position.

Also surviving is a much smaller half-length portrait of Henry by Holbein that is today in the collection of the Thyssen-Bornemisza Museum in Madrid. This, the only surviving painting of Henry from Holbein's hand, may also have been a preparatory study. In it Henry wears much the same clothing as the final mural but is still posed in a three-quarters view. For many years this painting was owned by the Spencer family and housed at Althorp. Financial problems forced the 7th Earl Spencer to sell much of the art collection, and it was purchased by Heinrich Thyssen.

All the remaining copies of the painting are today attributed to other artists, though in most cases the name of the copyist is unknown. They vary dramatically in their quality and faithfulness to the original source. Most of the reproductions only copy the image of Henry, though a copy by Remigius van Leemput of the entire mural is in the Royal Collection, usually on display at Hampton Court Palace. This was made in 1667 for Charles II. The highest quality, and best known copy is that currently in the collection of the Walker Art Gallery (illustration), which may have been commissioned by Edward Seymour, Jane's brother.

Location	Date	Notes	Image
Art Gallery of Ontario	2nd half 16th century	Circle of Hans Holbein the Younger	
Belvoir Castle			
Formerly Castle Howard	1542		
Chatsworth House	c. 1560–73	by Hans Eworth, likely commissioned by William Cavendish	
Hampton Court Palace	1667	Remigius van Leemput, only surviving depiction of the full mural	
Holyroodhouse			
National Maritime Museum			
Galleria Nazionale d'Arte Antica, Rome		Workshop of Hans Holbein the Younger, commissioned at the age of 49	
National Museum in Warsaw	1540s	Workshop of Hans Holbein the Younger	
National Portrait Gallery		Preparatory cartoon done by Holbein	
National Portrait Gallery			
National Portrait Gallery			
National Portrait Gallery			
National Portrait Gallery			
New College, Oxford			
Parham House			
Petworth House	Dendrochronology puts the boards at some time after 1525	Created by Holbein's studio	
Royal College of Physicians			
St Bartholomew's Hospital		Donated in 1737	
Thyssen-Bornemisza Museum	c. 1534–1536	Preparatory portrait done by Holbein. Formerly owned by the Earls Spencer and housed at Althorp.	
Trinity College, Cambridge	c. 1567	By Hans Eworth, oil on 5 oak planks, 229.6 x 124.1 cm on display in Trinity College's Hall. It was commissioned and bequeathed in 1567 by Robert Beaumont, one of the first Masters of the college. Briefly displayed at the Fitzwilliam Museum in Cambridge, UK in 2015	
Walker Art Gallery	Dendrochronology puts the boards at some time after 1530		
Unknown location (sold Christie's November 2006)	Dendrochronology puts the panels as from a tree felled between 1540 and 1560		
Weiss Gallery, London	c. 1600–10	Painted for Sir Henry Lee, and at Ditchley Park until sold in the estate sale of his descendant Harold Arthur Lee-Dillon, 17th Viscount Dillon (1844–1932), 24 May 1933. With the Weiss Gallery as of 2012.	
Windsor Castle, Royal Collection	1535–44		
Windsor Castle, Royal Collection	c. 1538–47?		
Windsor Castle, Royal Collection	1550–1650		
Windsor Castle, Royal Collection	1550–99		

== See also ==
- List of paintings by Hans Holbein the Younger
- Cultural depictions of Henry VIII
