= De Schepper =

De Schepper is a surname. Notable people with the surname include:

- Cornelis de Schepper (born 1503?-1555), Flemish counsellor and ambassador for the Holy Roman Emperor Charles V, Ferdinand I of Austria and Mary of Hungary, governor of the Netherlands
- Els de Schepper (born 1965), Flemish actress, comedian and writer
- Kenny de Schepper (born 1987), French tennis player
- Robert de Schepper (1885 – ?), Belgian Olympic fencer

== See also ==
- Scheppers
