= Aeneas Fleeing Troy =

Painting by Mattia Preti

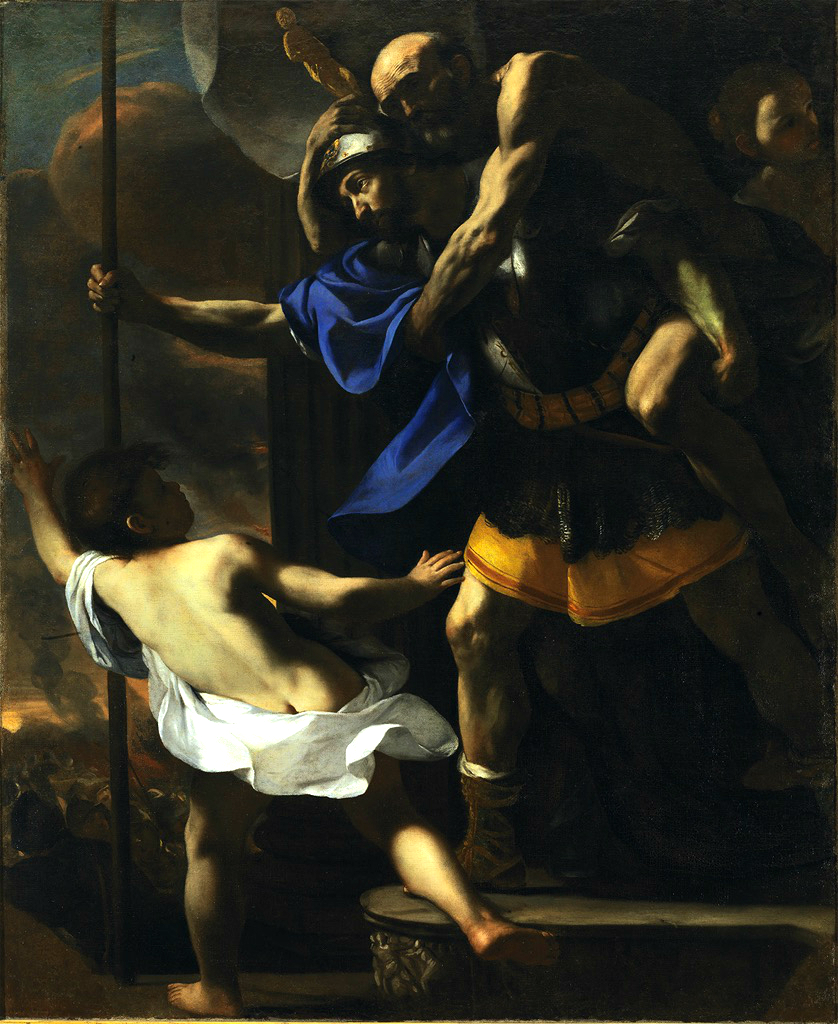
Aeneas Fleeing Troy (c. 1640–1645) by Mattia Preti

Aeneas Fleeing Troy or The Flight From Troy is an oil-on-canvas painting executed c. 1640–1645 by the Italian Baroque artist Mattia Preti, now in the Galleria nazionale di arte antica in Palazzo Barberini in Rome. It shows Aeneas carrying his father Anchises and being led by his young son Ascanius as told in Book 2 of the Aeneid. It first appears in the written record in an 1824 inventory of Giovanni Torlonia's collections, which misattributed it to Simon Vouet, with later inventories misattributing it to Alessandro Turchi and the correct attribution only restored in 1916 by Roberto Longhi.
