= Scheepers =

Scheepers is a Dutch and Afrikaans occupational surname meaning "shepherd's" in Middle Dutch. Notable people with the surname include:

- Chanelle Scheepers (born 1984), South African tennis player
- Gideon Scheepers (1878–1902), South African Boer military leader and scout
- Maria Scheepers (1892–1989) Belgian pianist and music educator
- Marion Scheepers (born 1957), American mathematician (namesake of the Scheepers Diagram)
- Nico Scheepers (born 1990), South African rugby player
- Ralf Scheepers (born 1965), German heavy metal singer (namesake of the album Scheepers)
- Riana Scheepers (born 1957), South African Afrikaans author
- Rozelle Scheepers (born 1974), South African cricketer
- Twan Scheepers (born 1971), Dutch footballer
- Willy Scheepers (born 1961), Dutch footballer

== See also ==
- Schepers, Dutch surname
- Scheppers, Dutch surname
- Scheepers Nek, battle site of the Second Boer War
