= Schepers =

Schepers is a Dutch and Low German occupational surname meaning "shepherd's" in Middle Dutch. Notable people with the surname include:

- Alphonse Schepers (1907–1984), Belgian racing cyclist
- Bob Schepers (born 1992), Dutch footballer
- Eddy Schepers (born 1955), Belgian cyclist
- Jan Schepers (1897–1997), Dutch fencer
- Ludger Schepers (born 1953), German auxiliary bishop
- Liz Schepers (born 1999), American ice hockey player
- Nancy Scheper-Hughes (born 1944), American anthropologist
- Willem Bastiaensz Schepers (1619–1704), Dutch admiral
- Wim Schepers (1943–1998), Dutch racing cyclist

== See also ==
- Scheepers
- Scheppers
