= Narcissus (Caravaggio) =

1590s painting by Caravaggio

- Narciso (Italian)
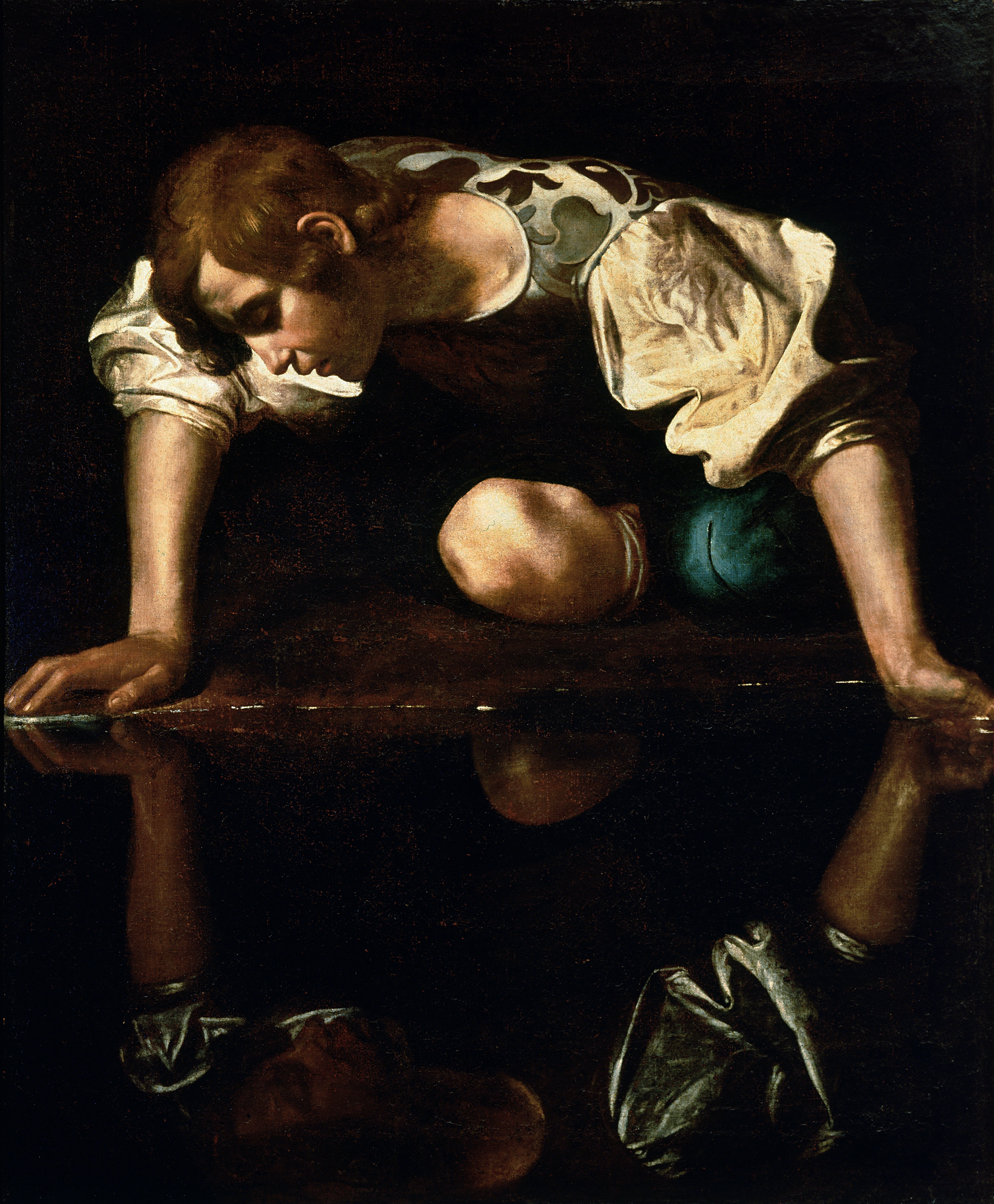
- Narcissus at the Source
- Artist: Caravaggio
- Year: 1597–1599
- Medium: Oil on canvas
- Dimensions: 110 cm × 92 cm (43 in × 36 in)
- Location: Galleria Nazionale d'Arte Antica, Rome

Narcissus is an oil on canvas painting by the Italian Baroque master Caravaggio, painted c. 1597 – c. 1599. It is housed in the Galleria Nazionale d'Arte Antica, in Rome.

The painting was originally attributed to Caravaggio by Roberto Longhi in 1916. Narcissus, according to the poet Ovid in his Metamorphoses, is a handsome youth who falls in love with his own reflection. Unable to tear himself away, he dies of his passion, and even as he crosses the Styx continues to gaze at his reflection (Metamorphoses 3:339–510).

== Background ==
The story of Narcissus was often referenced or retold in literature, for example, by Dante (Paradiso 3.18–19) and Petrarch (Canzoniere 45–46). The story was well known in the circles of such collectors in which Caravaggio was moving in this period, such as those of Cardinal Francesco Maria del Monte and the banker Vincenzo Giustiniani. Caravaggio's friend, the poet Giambattista Marino, wrote a description of Narcissus.

The story of Narcissus was particularly appealing to artists according to the Renaissance theorist Leon Battista Alberti: "the inventor of painting ... was Narcissus ... What is painting but the act of embracing by means of art the surface of the pool?"

Caravaggio painted an adolescent page wearing an elegant brocade doublet, leaning with both hands over the water, as he gazes at this own distorted reflection. The painting conveys an air of brooding melancholy: the figure of Narcissus is locked in a circle with his reflection, surrounded by darkness, so that the only reality is inside this self-regarding loop. The 16th century literary critic Tommaso Stigliani explained the contemporary thinking that the myth of Narcissus "clearly demonstrates the unhappy end of those who love their things too much."

== See also ==
- List of paintings by Caravaggio
