= Holy Family (Andrea del Sarto) =

Painting by Andrea del Sarto

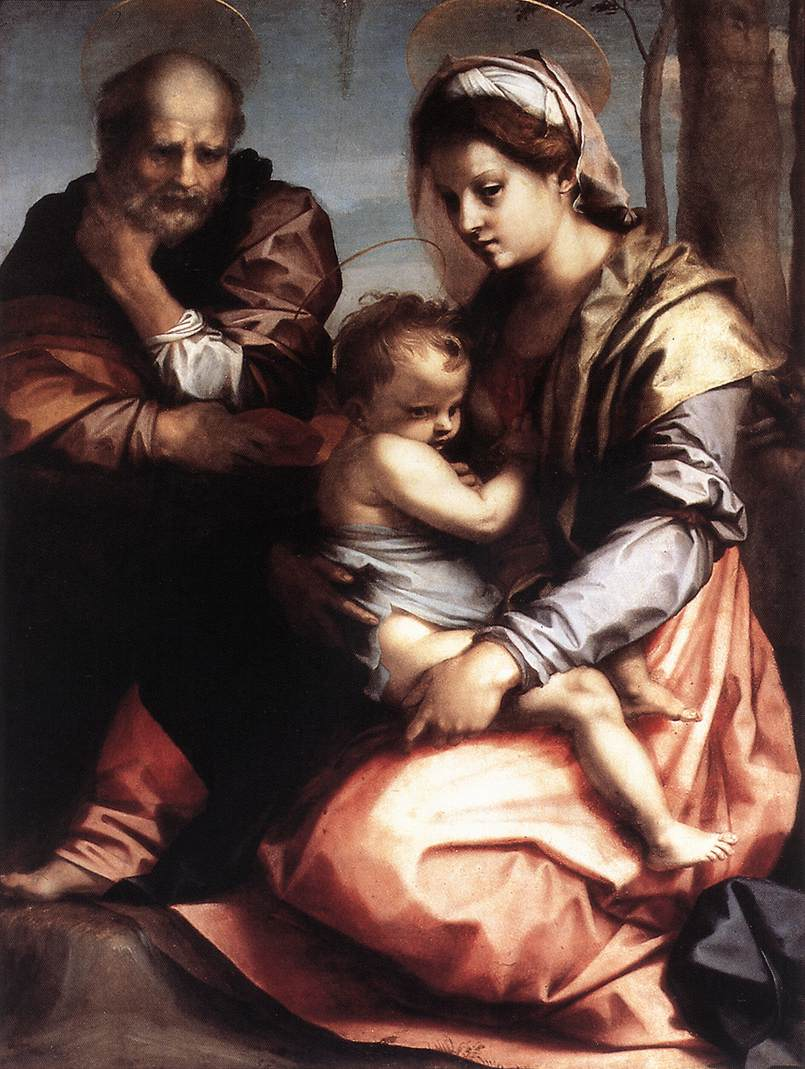
- Artist: Andrea del Sarto
- Year: 1528–1529
- Medium: Oil on wood
- Dimensions: 140 cm × 104 cm (55 in × 41 in)
- Location: Galleria Nazionale d'Arte Antica, Rome

The Holy Family, an oil-on-wood painting of 1528–1529 by the Italian Renaissance painter Andrea del Sarto, is in the Galleria Nazionale d'Arte Antica (Palazzo Barberini) in Rome.

== Description ==
The painting was commissioned in Florence by a Zanobi Strozzi for the chapel at his Villa of Rovezzano. It was cited by Giorgio Vasari in his biography of Sarto, who would die of the plague the next year. However, in 1580, the painting was sold by Monsignor Antonio Bracci to Jacopo Salviati, and it became part of the collections of the Colonna and later the Barberini, until it was purchased by the Italian state in 1935.

The painting depicts the Christ child in the lap of his mother, the Virgin Mary, while an elder Joseph meditatively contemplates the scene from a slightly recessed position. While the Virgin and Child form a geometric triangle, the work departs from a more equanimous Renaissance style in the exuberant folds of the robes and the slight angling of the faces.

There are several old copies that attest to its notoriety. The Prado Museum in Madrid has a version painted on wood, stored for a long time, which, after being analysed and cleaned, turned out to be a replica that the master left unfinished.
