= Anthonie Jansz. van der Croos =

Dutch painter

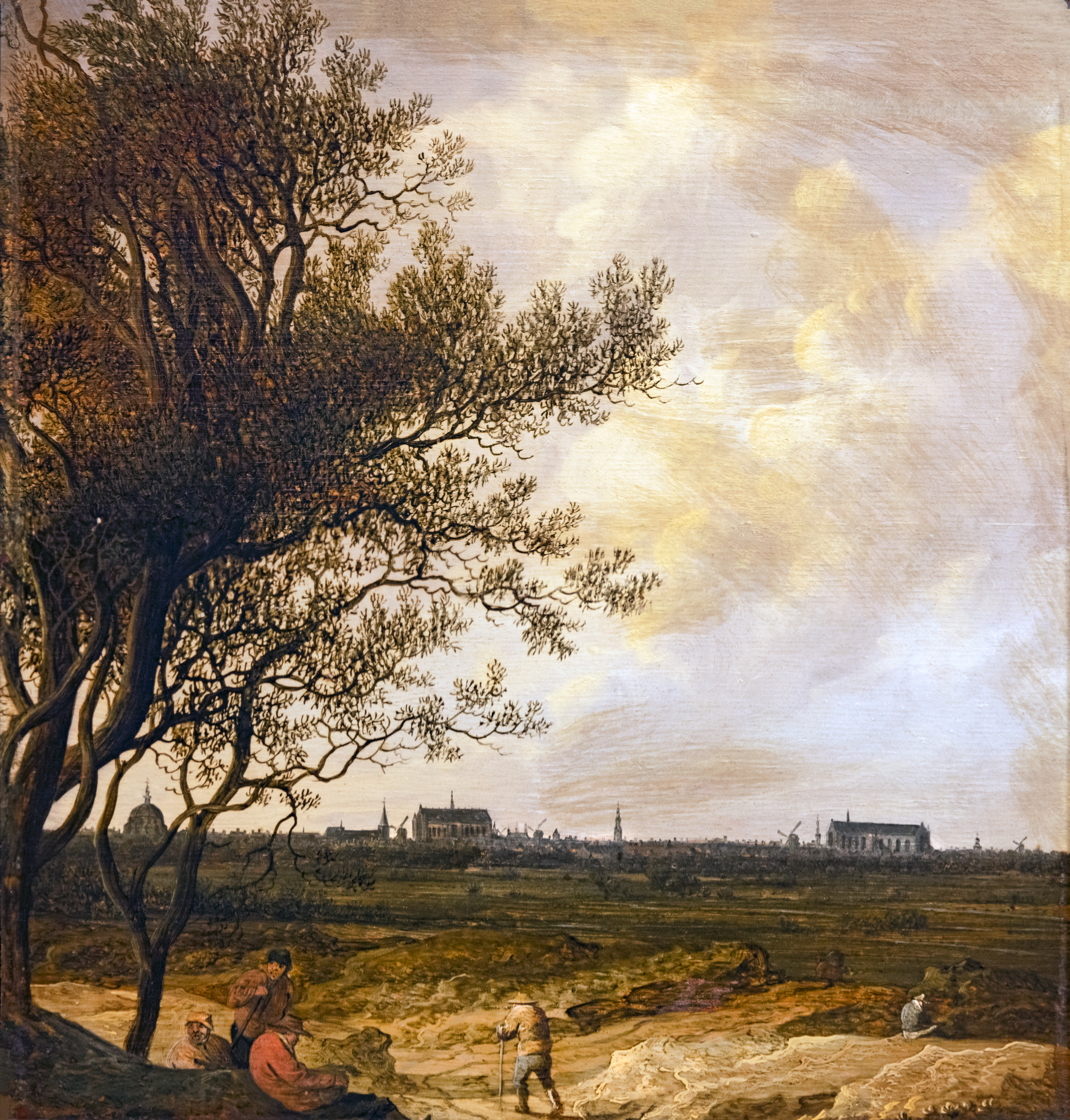
Anthonie Jansz. van der Croos, View of the city of Leiden Museum of Fine Arts of Carcassonne

Anthonie Jansz van der Croos (1606/07–1662/63), was a Dutch painter, draughtsman and poet.

Though probably born and raised in Alkmaar, from 1634 on Croos lived and worked mostly in The Hague. He primarily painted landscapes. For example, a Dutch landscape (Paesaggio olandese, in Italian) by van der Croos belongs to Pedriali collection (Collezione Pedriali) in the City Museum of Forlì (Italy).

He was influenced by Jan van Goyen. He died in The Hague between 8 March 1662 and 14 September 1663.
