= Marchesa Brigida Spinola-Doria =

Oil-on-canvas painting (1606)

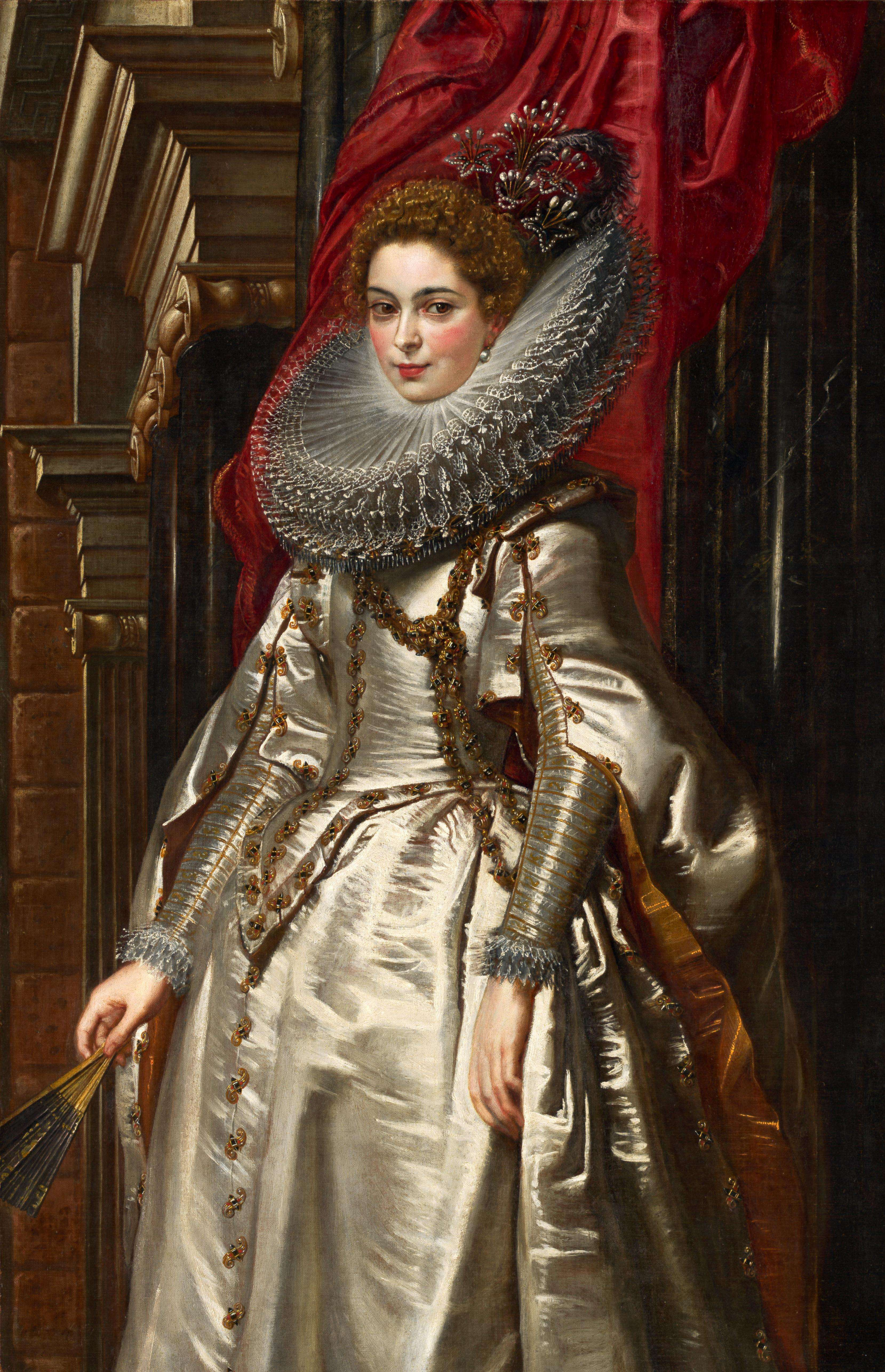
Portrait of Marchesa Brigida Spinola-Doria by Peter Paul Rubens, 1606 (National Gallery of Art)

The Portrait of Marchesa Brigida Spinola-Doria is an oil-on-canvas painting by Flemish artist Sir Peter Paul Rubens, dating to 1606. It is now in the National Gallery of Art in Washington, D.C., part of the Samuel H. Kress Collection. It was commissioned by Marchese Giacomo Massimiliano Doria of Genoa and shows his wife (and cousin) shortly after their wedding in 1605; she came from the equally prominent Spinola family. He died in 1613 and she remarried another Doria. It has been trimmed several times on each side, removing the garden shown in the background and the lower part of the figure.

== Description ==
The overall physical dimensions of the painting are now 152 by 98 centimetres (60 by 39 in) after the original was reduced in size during the 19th century. Rubens completed a pen and brown ink study for the painting, which is held in the Morgan Library & Museum in New York, enabling identification of sections eliminated. Details removed include the bottom of the Marchesa's floor-length wedding gown as the painting has been cut just below her knees and the architecture that formed the backdrop. Writing in The Burlington Magazine in 1951, Christopher Norris indicated the sketch portrayed a woman older than the 22-year-old Marchesa.

In the painting the Marchesa is placed in an opulent setting to convey luxury; adorned with jewels, she wears a satin and lace dress, with a broad ruff round her neck. Light is used to emphasise the draping of her bulky wedding gown, while she looks down on the viewer, establishing the necessity to hang the finished portrait above the height of viewers.

== Provenance and exhibitions ==
Marquess Giacomo Massimiliano Doria commissioned the portrait of his bride – they married on 9 July 1605 – and the painting remained in his ownership until his death in 1613 when it passed to his brother, Giovanni Carlo Doria (1576–1625). It subsequently became the property of Marchesa Brigida Spinola-Doria's second husband, probably in 1625, passing back to the Marchesa until her death in 1661. It remained in the family until given to relatives of Rati Opizzone. By 1848 it was held in Paris by Simon Horsín-Déon. Four years later, in 1854, the portrait was in London and sold several times before being purchased by the Samuel H. Kress foundation in 1957 who donated it to the National Gallery of Art in 1961.

First exhibited in 1952 at the Minneapolis Institute of Art when it was likely in the ownership of the Duveen Brothers, it was also displayed at the Royal Academy of Arts in 1953. Since 1961 it has regularly been featured in exhibitions.
