= Portrait of Henry VIII (Holbein, Rome) =

Painting by Hans Holbein the Younger

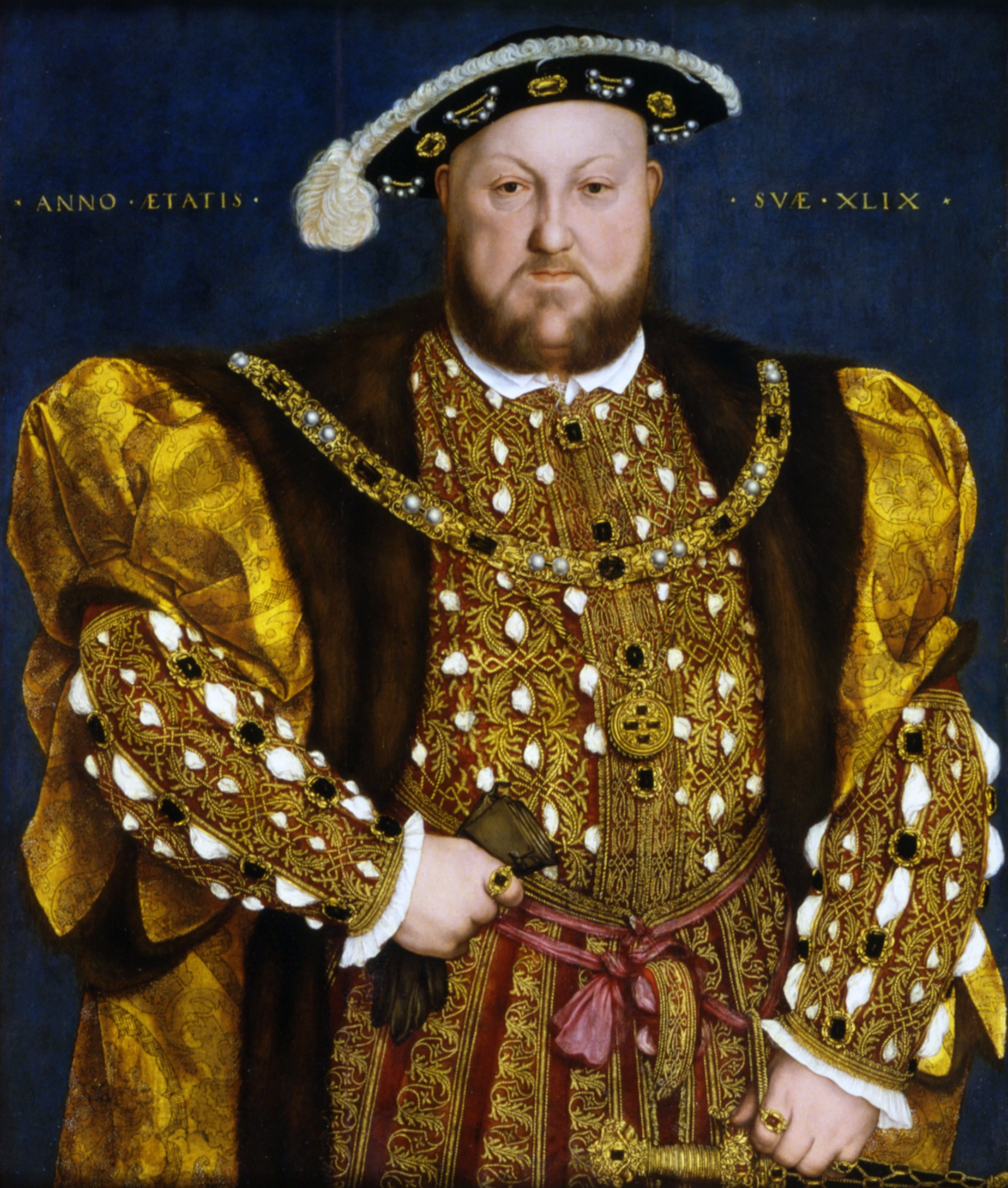
- Artist: Hans Holbein the Younger
- Year: 1540
- Catalogue: 117
- Medium: Oil on wood
- Subject: Henry VIII
- Dimensions: 88.5 cm × 74.5 cm (34.8 in × 29.3 in)
- Location: Galleria Nazionale d'Arte Antica, Rome, Italy
- Accession: 878

The Portrait of Henry VIII in the Palazzo Barberini, Rome, is a painting completed in 1540 by Hans Holbein the Younger, who served as a court painter to Henry VIII over the course of 11 years in England.

The painting was executed three years after the famed Portrait of Henry VIII, or the Whitehall Mural, which was destroyed by fire in 1698. One of many royal portraits commissioned in Holbein's time, this painting is now in the collection of the Galleria Nazionale d'Arte Antica.

== Description ==
From 1532 to his death in 1543, Holbein was welcomed into the court of Henry VIII, amidst the turmoil of the Reformation in the city of Basel, as a way to continue artistic expression during iconoclasm.

From his earlier stays in 1528, his reputation spread through previous commissions such as the Portrait of Sir Thomas More (1527), as well as portraits of Lutheran merchants, with a 1533 commission during the procession of Anne Boleyn earning him a position in the royal court. Seen as "the King's Painter" by Nicholas Bourbon, the court poet, Holbein's many portraits were utilized as propaganda which helped rehabilitate and elevate Henry amidst scandals and the establishment of the Church of England.

The famed but lost Whitehall Mural of 1537 commemorated the birth of Edward VI. Many other commissions in that time presented life events such as Henry's multiple marriages, often coordinated with Thomas Cromwell.

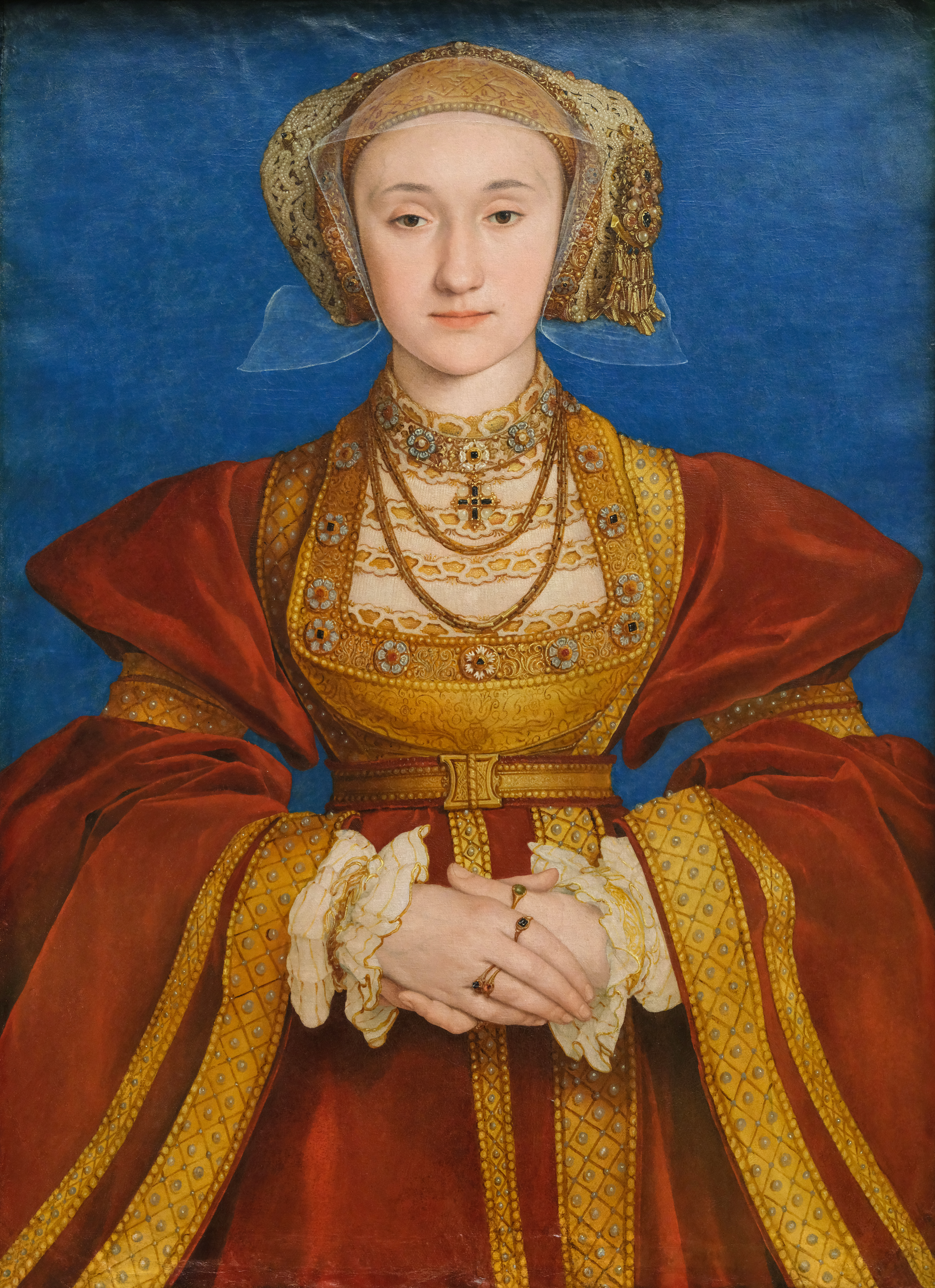
Holbein's portrait of Anne of Cleves (1539), commissioned prior to the wedding

Henry married his fourth wife, Anne of Cleves, in January 1540. This official portrait was commissioned accordingly to carry out the message of the King's authority. Rather than with a sceptre or crown, Holbein depicts Henry holding a glove on one hand, and the other hand holding his sword-hilt. With emphasis on his clothing and jewellery, as well as the choice of a smaller canvas to increase the coverage of his body, emphasis is placed on Henry's imposing size and authority.

The inscription ANNO ÆTATIS SVÆ XLIX dates the painting to 1540, when Henry was 49 years old.

== Exhibition and display ==
A permanent part of the Galleria Nazionale d'Arte Antica, in 2025, the 1540 portrait is loan to the Wadsworth Atheneum in Hartford, Connecticut, as part of an exchange with the Galleria Nazionale, which borrowed Caravaggio's Saint Francis of Assisi in Ecstasy for a retrospective special exhibition.

== See also ==
- List of paintings by Hans Holbein the Younger
