= Portrait of Benedetto Varchi =

Painting by Titian

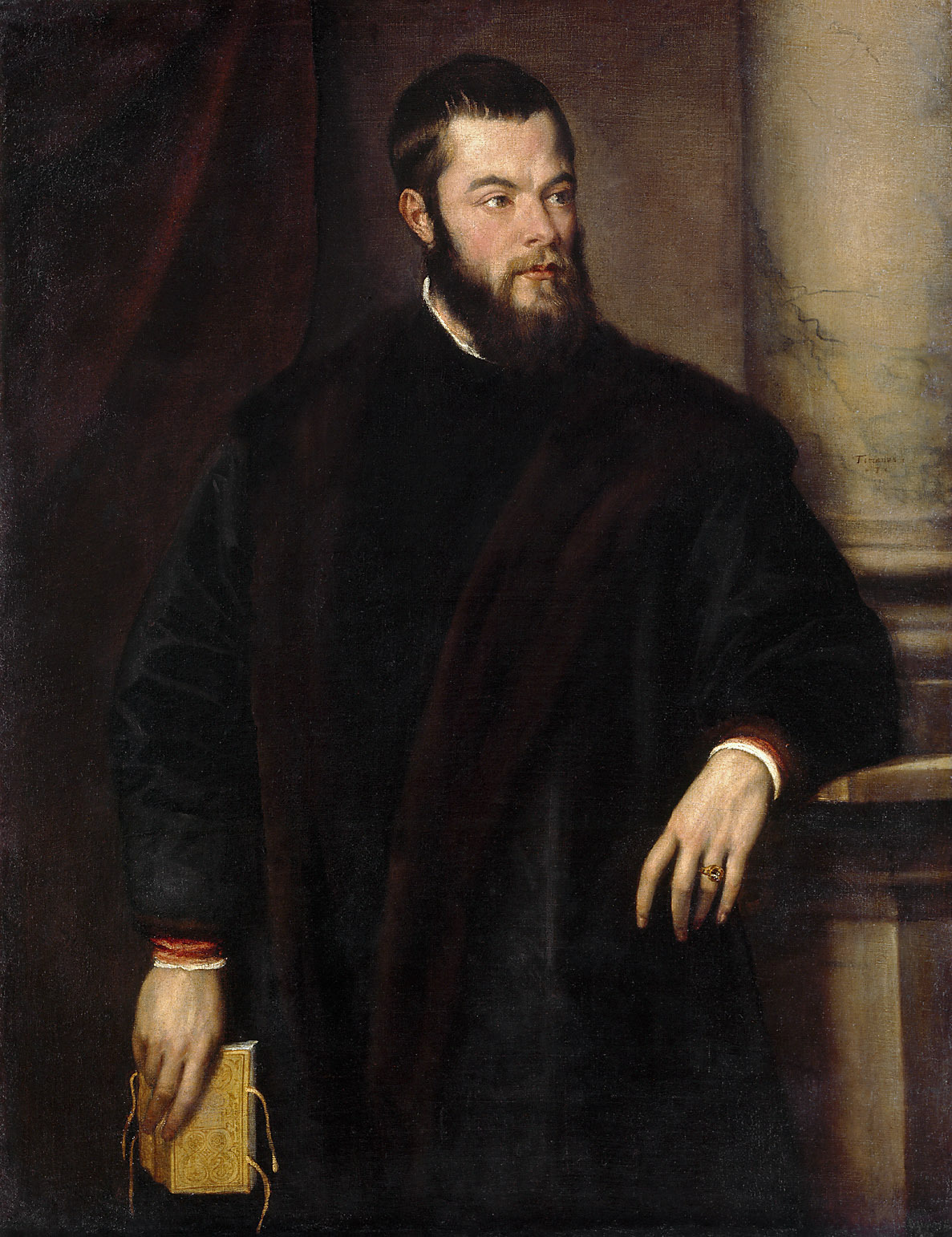
- Artist: Titian
- Year: c. 1536–1540
- Medium: Oil on canvas
- Dimensions: 119.3 cm × 92.7 cm (47.0 in × 36.5 in)
- Location: Kunsthistorisches Museum; Vienna
- Accession: GG_91

Portrait of Benedetto Varchi, also called Portrait of a Man, is an oil on canvas painting by Titian. It was painted c. 1536-1540, and hangs today in the Kunsthistorisches Museum, in Vienna.

== Analysis ==
According to Walter Gronau, the indication that the person here represented is Benedetto Varchi, the Florentine historian and humanist scholar, seems in no way proved. It is signed "Titianus F.", with some repainting. Though restored, Gronau thinks it a genuine work by Titian. From the style, he thinks that this portrait must have been painted about 1550, possibly somewhat later. The Kunsthistorisches Museum, however, identifies the sitter as Benedetto Varchi without any qualification, and states that it was probably painted during his stay in Venice in 1536–1540.

== Provenance ==
- 1636—Collection of Bartolomeo della Nave, Venice;
- 1638–1649—Collection of the Duke of Hamilton;
- 1659 —Collection of Archduke Leopold Wilhelm, Vienna.

== Gallery ==
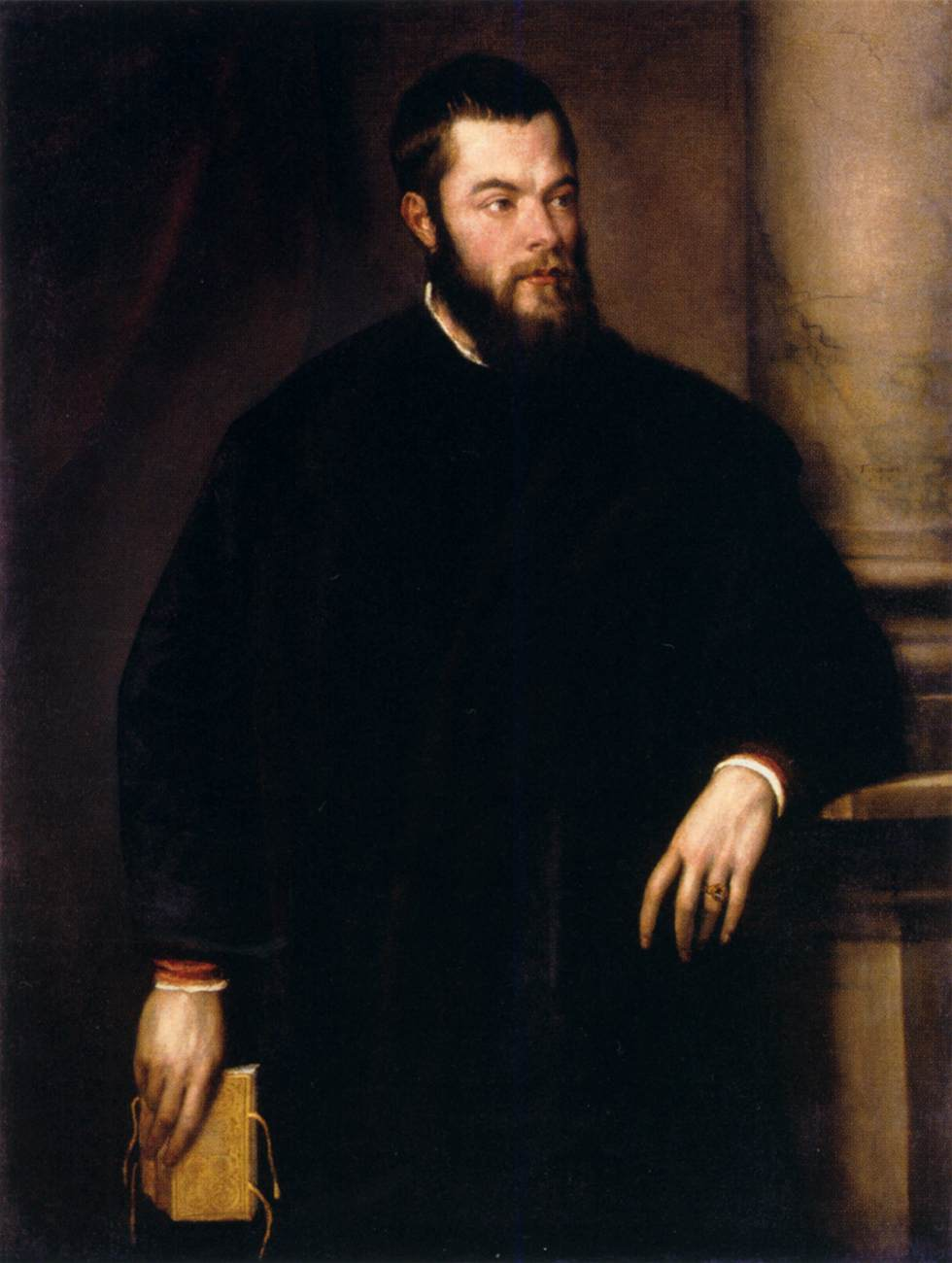
Original portrait by Titian, c. 1540

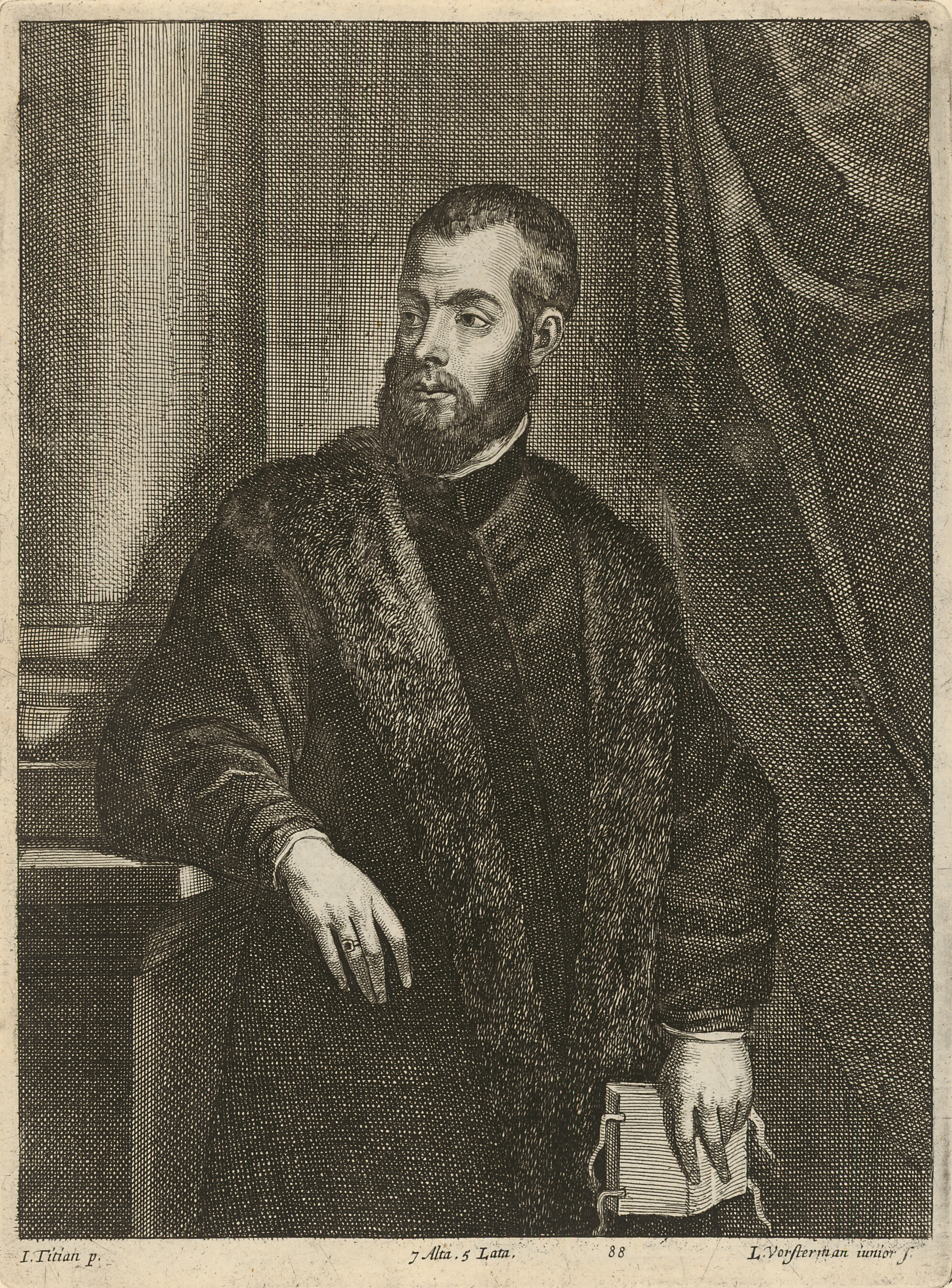
Engraved by Lucas Vorsterman the Elder after Titian for the Theatrum Pictorium, 1673

== See also ==
- List of works by Titian

== Sources ==
- Gronau, Georg (1904). Titian. London: Duckworth and Co; New York: Charles Scribner's Sons. p. 276.
- Ricketts, Charles (1910). Titian. London: Methuen & Co. Ltd. p. 176, plate cxix.
- "Benedetto Varchi". Kunsthistorisches Museum Wien. Retrieved 23 November 2022.
