= Cristóbal de Acevedo =

Spanish painter

Cristóbal de Acebedo (born c. 1540) was a Spanish painter, active mainly during the Renaissance period.

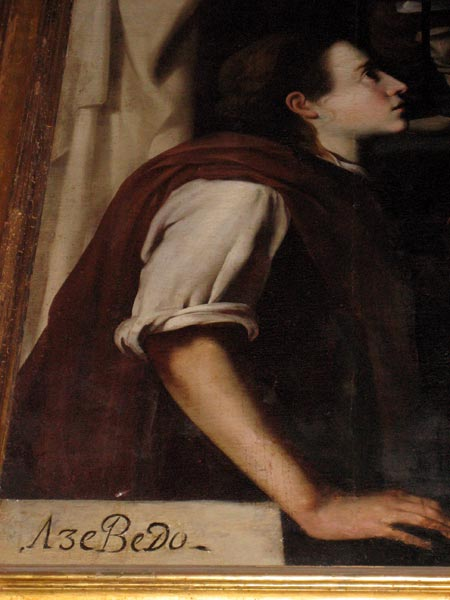
A picture of Cristóbal de Acevedo

He was born likely in Madrid and was a disciple of Bartolomé Carducho in 1585, and painted pictures for many of the convents in the capital.
