= Vincenzo degli Azani =

Italian painter

Vincenzo degli Azani (died 16 July 1557) was an Italian painter, active mainly in his native Palermo, except for a spell in Rome, where he came under the influence of Raphael. He is also known as Vincenzo da Pavia, Vincenzo Aniemolo, Vincenzo degli Azani da Pavia, Il Romano and Vincenzo Romano.

== Biography ==
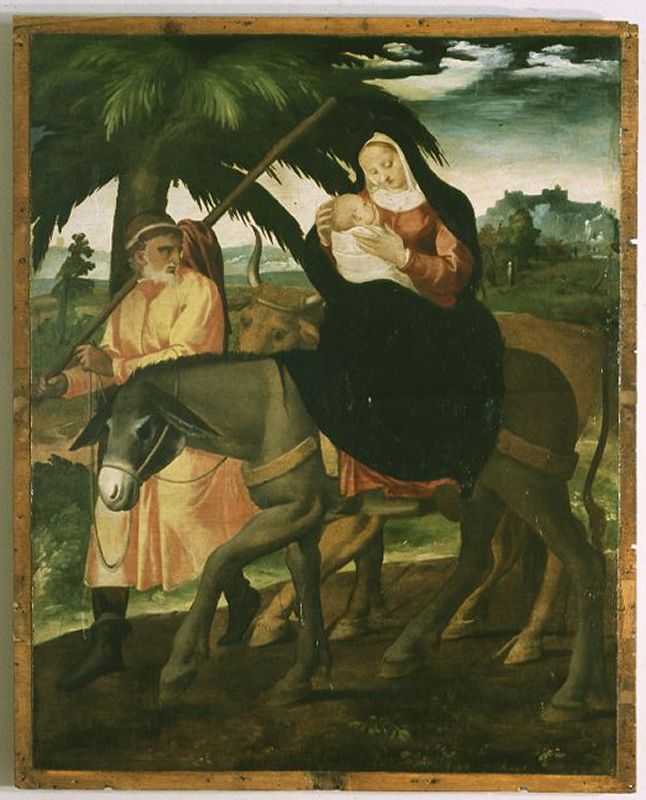
The Flight into Egypt from the Cappella dei Lombardi in the church of S. Giacomo la Marina in Palermo

Vincenzo was born at Palermo towards the end of the 15th century. After having studied the works of Perugino and other masters in his native town, he went to Rome. There he came under the influence of Raphael, whose works had a great impact on his style, although it is not known if he was actually his pupil. Vincenzo left the city in 1527 at the time of its pillage and returned to Sicily, going first to Messina and then on to Palermo, where he lived until his death.

He left many pictures in the churches of Palermo including the Virgin and Child between four Saints, in San Pietro Martire; the Virgin of the Rosary, in San Domenico and the Sposalizio, in Santa Maria degli Angeli. All show strong traces of the influence of Raphael. A late work, the Death of the Virgin, for the Chiesa del Carmine in Sciacca, was based on a painting of the same subject by the Netherlandish artist Petrus Christus. It was left unfinished when Vincenzo died in 1557.
