= Marguerite Scheppers =

16th-century Dutch painter

Marguerite Scheppers (fl. 1501) was a Dutch painter.

She was a miniaturist and known for her illuminations she performed in a number of nunneries such as in the couvent des sœurs de Notre-Dame and couvent des sœurs de Sion, though she was not herself a nun. She was active from 1501 onward, and regarded for her skill as a miniaturist.

She was the teacher of Cornelia van Wulfskerke (died 15 April 1540), a sister of the convent of Sion.
