= Galleria Nazionale d'Arte Antica =

Art gallery in Rome, Italy

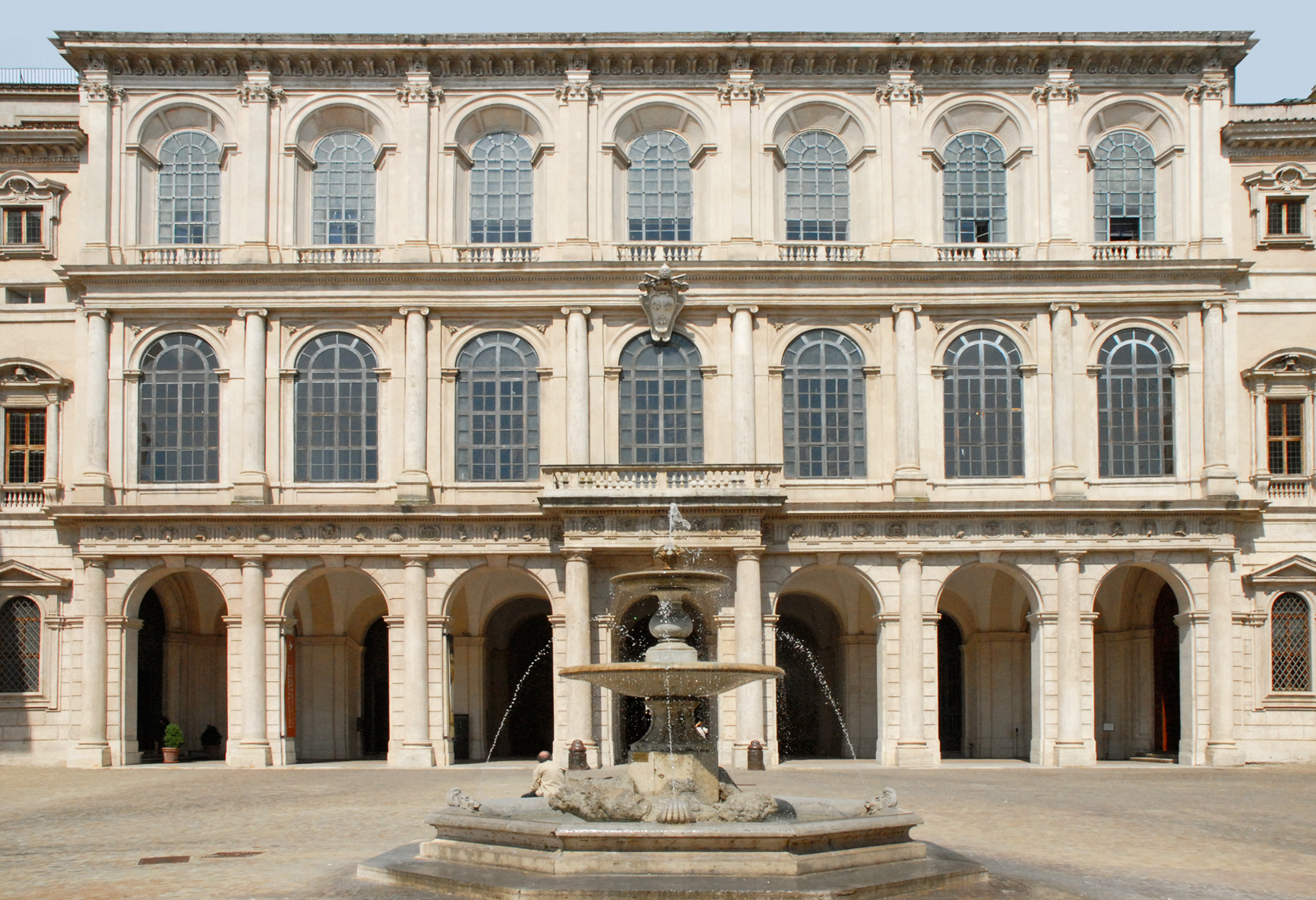
- Facade of the Palazzo Barberini
- Click on the map for a fullscreen view
- Established: 1893
- Location: Palazzo Barberini, via delle Quattro Fontane, 13 (); Palazzo Corsini, Via della Lungara 10 (); Rome, Italy
- Coordinates: 41°54′12.65″N 12°29′24.75″E
- Visitors: 153,549
- Director: Flaminia Gennari Santori
- Website: www.barberinicorsini.org

The Galleria Nazionale d'Arte Antica ('National Gallery of Ancient Art') is an art museum in Rome, Italy. It is the principal national collection of older paintings in Rome – mostly from before 1800; it does not hold any antiquities. It has two sites: the Palazzo Barberini and the Palazzo Corsini.

The gallery's collection includes works by Bernini, Caravaggio, van Dyck, Holbein, Fra Angelico, Filippo Lippi, Lotto, Preti, Poussin, El Greco, Raphael, Tiepolo, Tintoretto, Rubens, Murillo, Ribera and Titian.

== Design ==
The Palazzo Barberini was designed for Pope Urban VIII, a member of the Barberini family, by the sixteenth-century architect Carlo Maderno on the former location of Villa Sforza. The ceiling of its central salone was decorated by Pietro da Cortona with the visual panegyric of the Allegory of Divine Providence and Barberini Power. The museum expanded through purchases and donations, such as the acquisition of the Torlonia and Monte di Pietà collections in 1892, the donation of Henriette Hertz in 1915, and the purchase of the Chigi collection in 1918.

== Palazzo Barberini ==
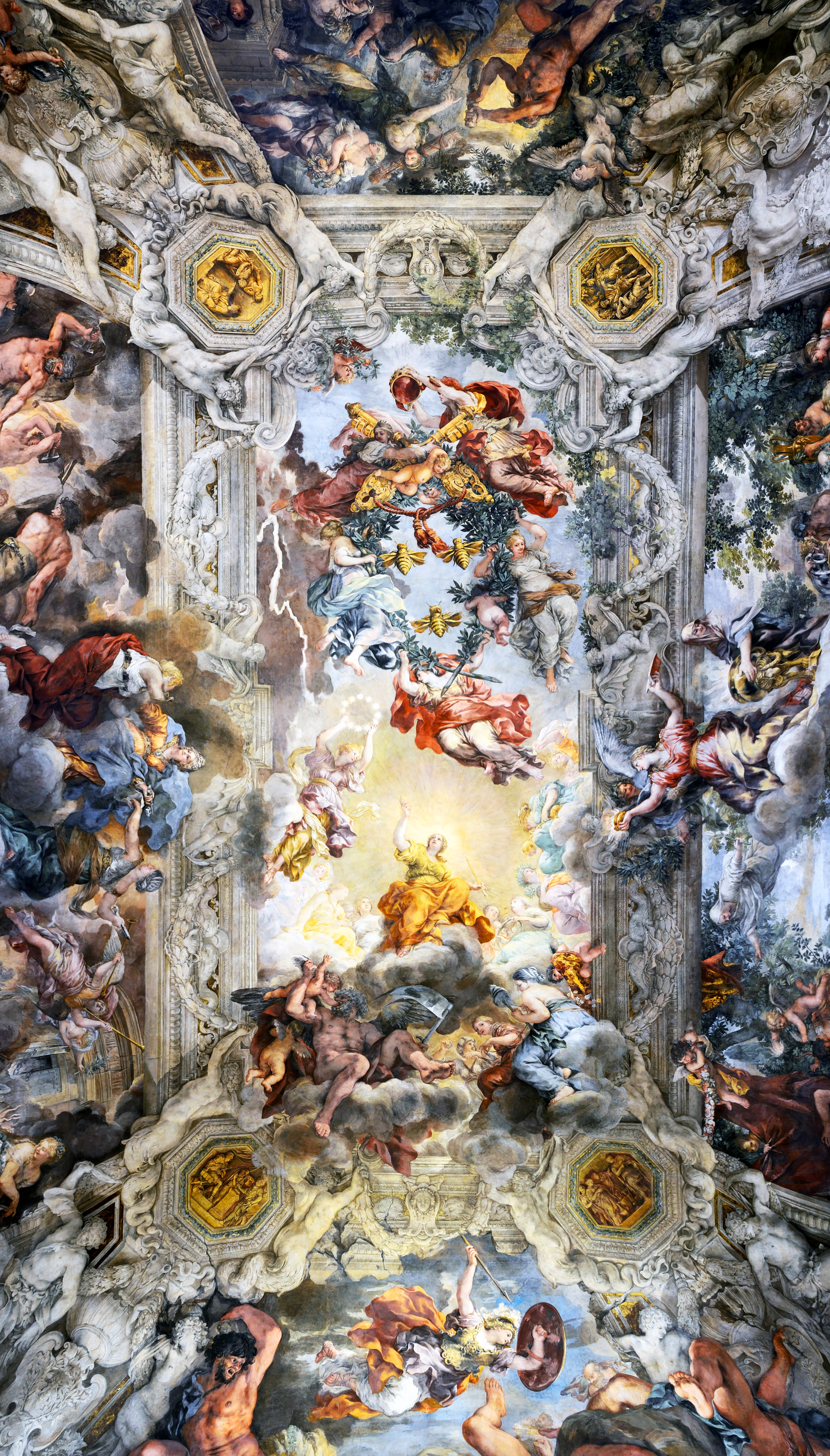
Palazzo Barberini, Triumph of Divine Providence by Pietro da Cortona on the ceiling of the Salone.

Raphael, La Fornarina

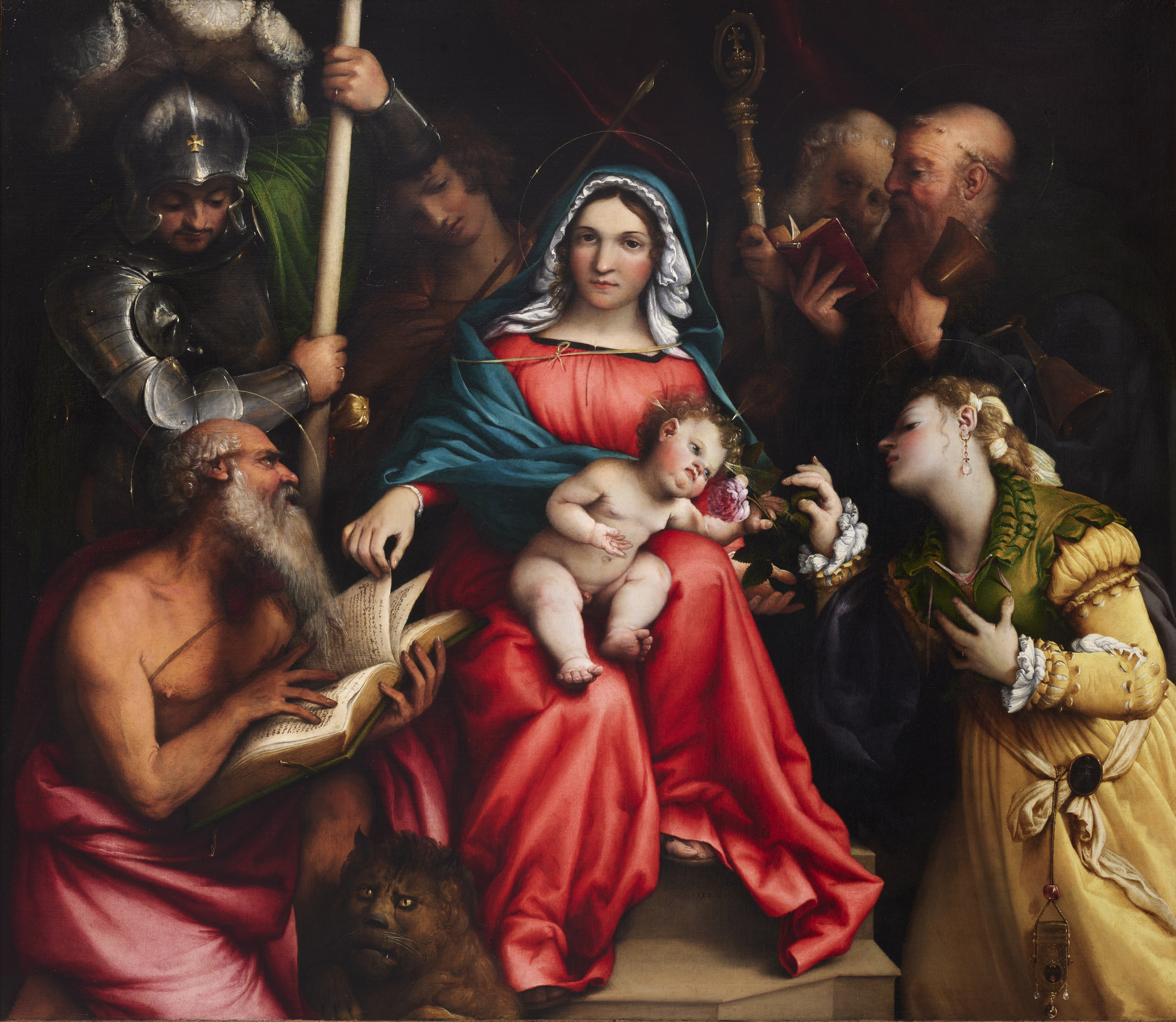
Lorenzo Lotto, Mystic Marriage of Saint Catherine of Alexandria and Saints

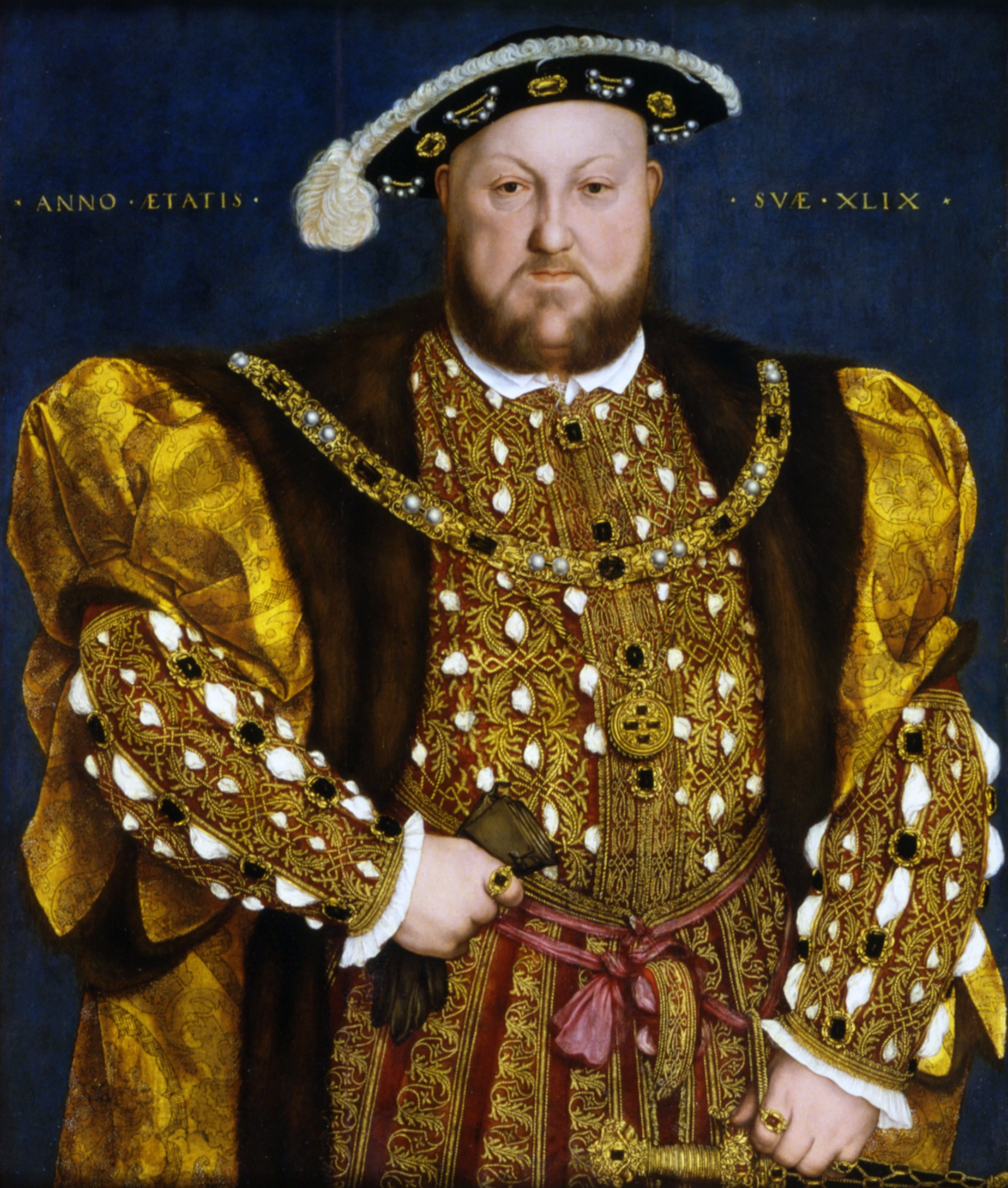
Hans Holbein the Younger, Portrait of Henry VIII

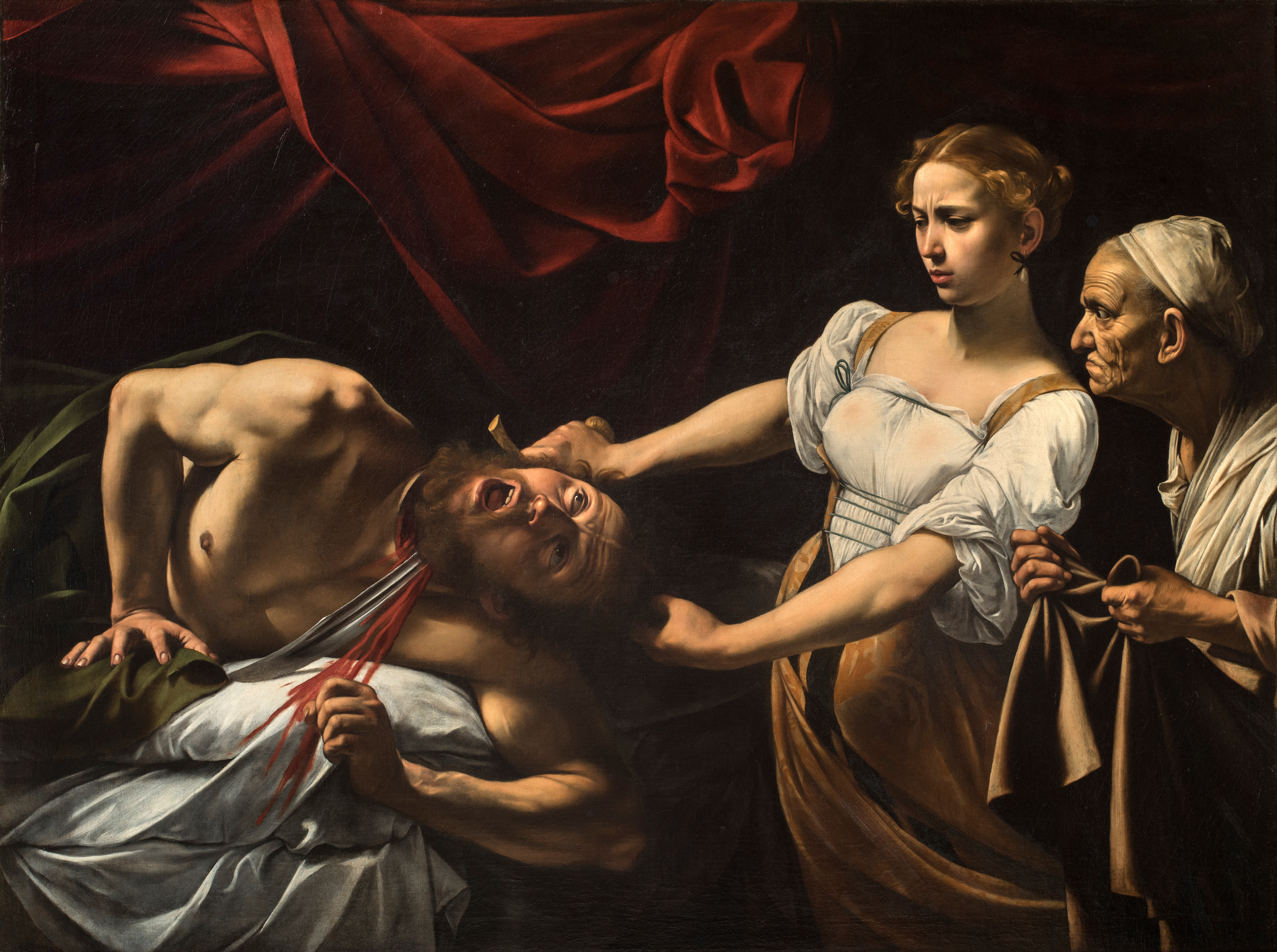
Caravaggio, Judith Beheading Holofernes

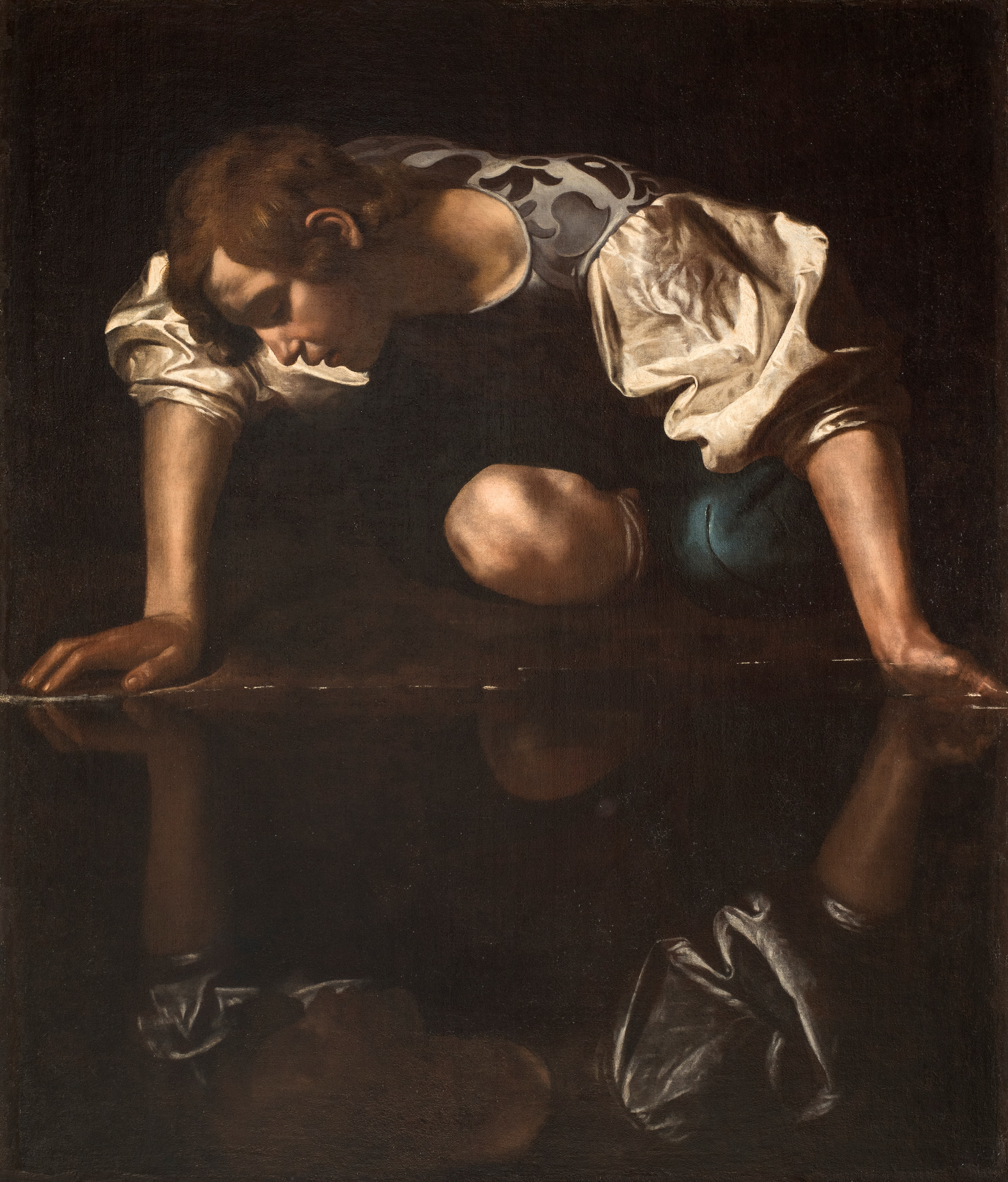
Caravaggio, Narcissus

Andrea del Sarto

- Holy Family, c. 1528

Bartolomeo Veneto

- Portrait of a Gentleman

Pompeo Batoni

- Portrait of Abbondio Rezzonico
- Portrait of Sir Henry Peirse
- Hagar and the Angel

Gian Lorenzo Bernini

- Portrait of Pope Urban VIII
- Bust of Pope Urban VIII
- Bust of Pope Clement X

Agnolo Bronzino

- Portrait of Stefano Colonna

Canaletto

- The Grand Canal
- Piazza San Marco and the Piazzetta to the South
- Rialto Bridge
- The Piazzetta with the Biblioteca Marciana
- View of Piazza San Marco with the Procuratie

Caravaggio

- Portrait of Maffeo Barberini, c. 1598
- Judith Beheading Holofernes, 1599
- Narcissus, 1599
- Saint Francis in Prayer, 1605

El Greco

- Adoration of the Shepherds
- Baptism of Christ

Pedro Fernández da Murcia

- Vision of Blessed Amedeo Menez da Sylva, c. 1513

Garofalo

- The Vestal Claudia Quinta Towing the Ship with the Statue of Cybele

Giulio Romano

- Herz Madonna, 1522–1523

Guercino

- Et in Arcadia ego, 1618–1622

Hans Holbein the Younger

- Portrait of Henry VIII

Giovanni Lanfranco

- Venus Playing the Harp

Filippo Lippi

- Madonna of Tarquinia, 1437
- Annunciation with Two Kneeling Donors, 1440–1445

Lorenzo Lotto

- Mystical Marriage of Saint Catherine of Alexandria and Saints, 1524

Quentin Massys

- Portrait of Erasmus of Rotterdam

Pierre-Étienne Monnot

- Model of the Funerary Monument of Pope Innocent XI, c. 1697

Perugino

- Saint Philip Benizi

Piero di Cosimo

- Saint Mary Magdalene

Pietro da Cortona

- Guardian Angel

Roman Painter

- Madonna Advocata and Christ Blessing

Nicolas Poussin

- Landscape with Hagar and the Angel

Aniello Falcone

- The Anchorite

Mattia Preti

- Allegory of the Five Senses, 1641–1646 (together with his brother Gregorio)
- Aeneas Fleeing Troy, c. 1630
- The Banquet of the Rich Man, c. 1655

Raphael

- La Fornarina, 1518–1519

Guido Reni

- Penitent Magdalene, c. 1631–1632
- Portrait of Beatrice Cenci

Giovanni Battista Tiepolo

- Satyr and Cupid

Tintoretto

- Christ and the Adulteress

Titian

- Venus and Adonis, c. 1560

Simon Vouet

- The Good Fortune

Gaspar van Wittel

- The Promenade at the Villa Medici

Valentin de Boulogne

- The Expulsion of the Merchants from the Temple

== Palazzo Corsini ==
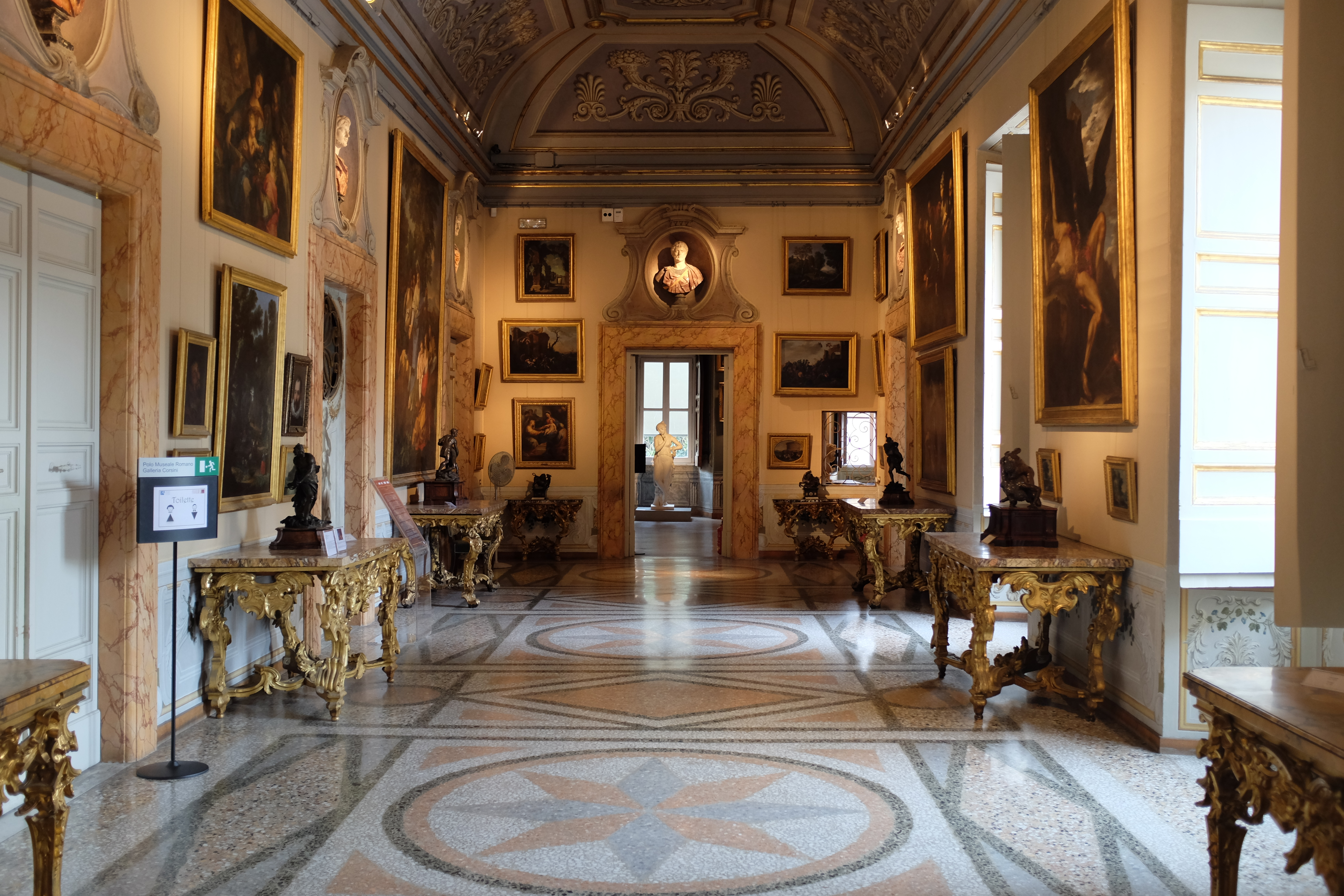
The exhibition in the Palazzo Corsini

The Palazzo Corsini, formerly known as Palazzo Riario, is a fifteenth-century palace, rebuilt in the eighteenth century by the architect Ferdinando Fuga for Cardinal Neri Maria Corsini. The majority of the major works in the Corsini Gallery collection were donated by the Corsini family, and initially were gathered by the avid 17th-century collector.

=== Main exhibitions ===
- Andrea del Sarto
  - Madonna and Child
- Baciccio
  - Portrait of Cardinal Neri Corsini
- Jacopo Bassano
  - Adoration of the Shepherds
- Beato Angelico
  - Triptych of the Last Judgement
- Marco Benefial
  - Vision of Saint Caterina Fieschi
- Christian Berentz
  - The Elegant Snack
- Caravaggio
  - Saint John the Baptist
- Rosalba Carriera
  - The Four Elements
- Fra Bartolomeo
  - Holy Family
- Orazio Gentileschi
  - Madonna and Child
- Luca Giordano
  - Christ Among the Doctors
- Giovanni da Milano
  - Polyptych with Stories of Christ
- Giovanni Lanfranco
  - Saint Peter Heals Saint Agatha in Prison
- Carlo Maratta
  - Rebecca and Elias at the Well
- Bartolomé Esteban Murillo
  - Madonna and Child
- Giambattista Piazzetta
  - Judith and Holofernes
- Mattia Preti
  - The Tribute Money
- Nicolas Poussin
  - Triumph of Ovid
- Guido Reni
  - Salome with the Head of John the Baptist
- Jusepe de Ribera
  - Venus and Adonis
- Salvator Rosa
  - Torment of Prometheus
- Peter Paul Rubens
  - Saint Sebastian Tended by Angels
  - Study of a Head
- Simon Vouet
  - Herodias with the Head of John the Baptist

== See also ==
- Paintings in the Galleria Nazionale d'Arte Antica
- List of national galleries
