= The Cenci =

1819 play by Percy Bysshe Shelley

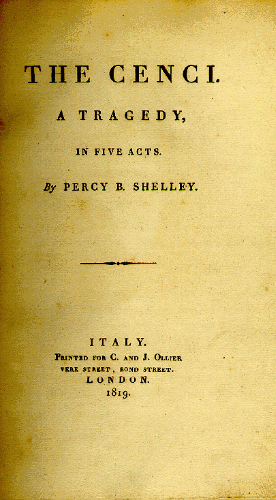
1819 title page, Livorno first edition, C. and J. Ollier, London.

The Cenci. A Tragedy, in Five Acts (/ˈtʃɛntʃi/ CHEN-chee) is a verse drama in five acts by Percy Bysshe Shelley written in the summer of 1819, and inspired by a real Roman family, the House of Cenci (in particular, Beatrice Cenci). Shelley composed the play in Rome and at Villa Valsovano near Livorno, from May to 5 August 1819. The work was published by Charles and James Ollier in London in 1819. The Livorno edition was printed in Livorno, Italy by Shelley himself in a run of 250 copies. Shelley told Thomas Love Peacock that he arranged for the printing himself because in Italy "it costs, with all duties and freightage, about half of what it would cost in London." Shelley sought to have the play staged, describing it as "totally different from anything you might conjecture that I should write; of a more popular kind... written for the multitude." Shelley wrote to his publisher Charles Ollier that he was confident that the play "will succeed as a publication". A second edition appeared in 1821, his only published work to go into a second edition during his lifetime.

The play was not considered stageable in its day due to its themes of incest and parricide, and was not performed in public in England until 1922, when it was staged in London. In 1886 the Shelley Society had sponsored a private production at the Grand Theatre, Islington, before an audience that included Oscar Wilde, Robert Browning, and George Bernard Shaw. Though there has been much debate over the play's stageability, it has been produced in many countries, including France, Germany, Italy, Russia, Czechoslovakia, and the United States. It was included in the Harvard Classics as one of the most important and representative works of the Western canon.

In 2026, a new adaptation by Phillip Allan was written based on the Shelley play that also relied on the Antonin Artaud adaptation and the Stendhal and Dumas versions.

== Plot ==
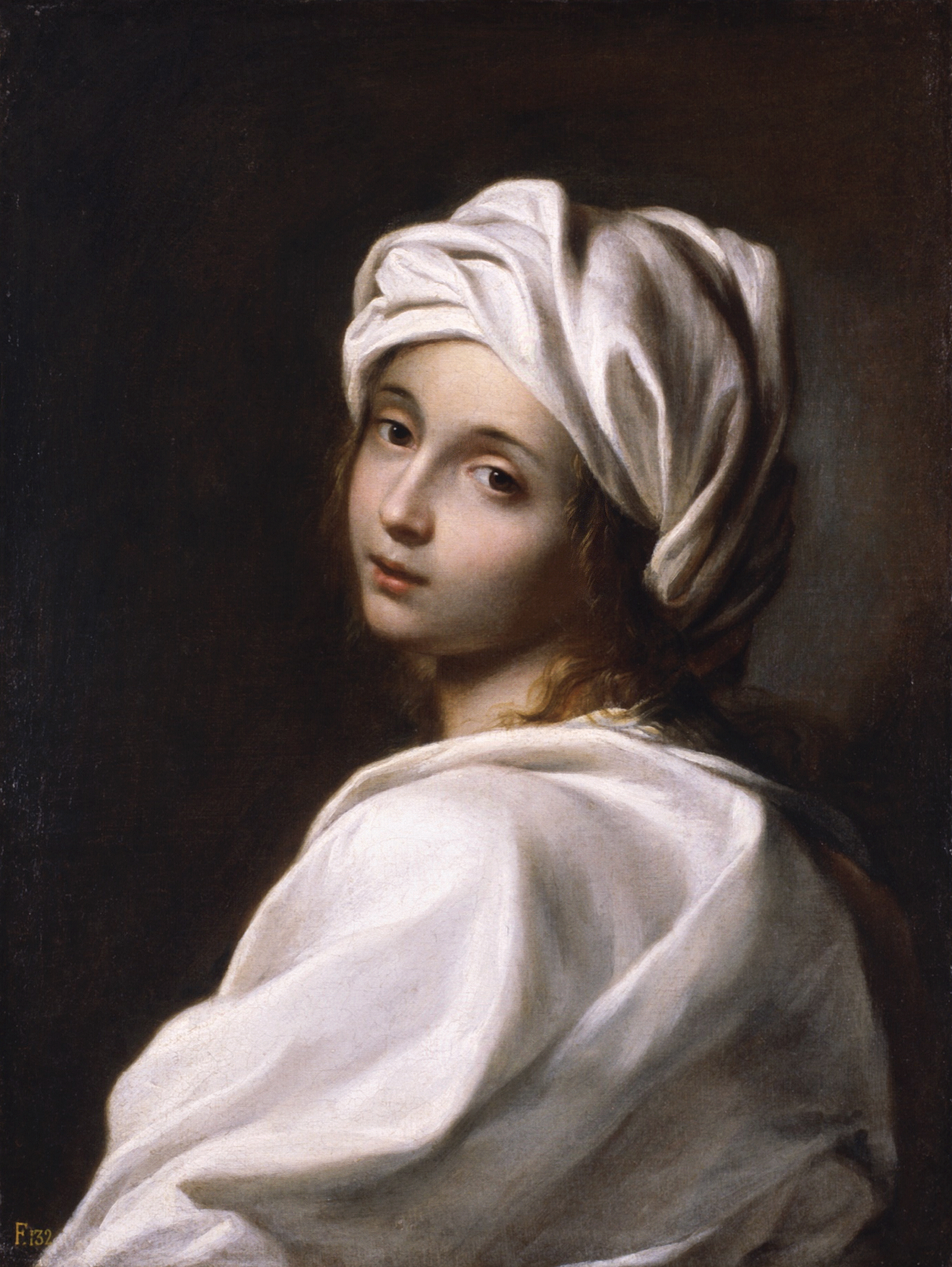
A possible portrait of Beatrice Cenci variously attributed to Guido Reni or Elisabetta Sirani, supposedly from life, (Note: In fact, Guido Reni would not have been in Rome at the time of Cenci's trial and the portrait is more likely intended to represent a sibyl.) praised by Stendhal, Dickens, and Hawthorne and inspiring Shelley's play.

The horrific tragedy, set in 1599 in Rome, of a young woman executed for premeditated murder of her tyrannical father, was a well-known true story handed down orally and documented in the Annali d'Italia, a twelve-volume chronicle of Italian history written by Ludovico Antonio Muratori in 1749. The events occurred during the Pontificate of Pope Clement VIII. Some local historical sources also note that Beatrice Cenci was born in a palazzo located in what is now the Regola district of Rome, near the present-day Hotel Monte Cenci.

Shelley was first drawn to dramatize the tale after viewing a supposed portrait of Beatrice Cenci, then attributed to Guido Reni, which intrigued his poetic imagination. It is now attributed to Ginevra Cantofoli.

Act I

The play opens with Cardinal Camillo discussing with Count Francesco Cenci a murder in which Cenci is implicated. Camillo tells Cenci that the matter will be hushed up if Cenci will relinquish a third of his possessions, his property beyond the Pincian gate, to the Church. Count Cenci has sent two of his sons, Rocco and Cristofano, to Salamanca, Spain in the expectation that they will die of starvation. The Count's virtuous daughter, Beatrice, and Orsino, a prelate in love with Beatrice, discuss petitioning the Pope to relieve the Cenci family from the Count's brutal rule. Orsino withholds the petition, however, revealing himself to be disingenuous, lustful for Beatrice, and greedy. After he hears the news that his sons have been brutally killed in Salamanca, the Count holds a feast in celebration of their deaths, commanding his guests to revel with him. Cenci drinks wine which he imagines as "my children's blood" which he "did thirst to drink!" During the feast, Beatrice pleads with the guests to protect her family from her sadistic father, but the guests refuse, in fear of Cenci's brutality and retribution.

Act II

Count Cenci torments Beatrice and her stepmother, Lucretia, and announces his plan to imprison them in his castle in Petrella. A servant returns Beatrice's petition to the Pope, unopened, and Beatrice and Lucretia despair over the last hope of salvation from the Count. Orsino encourages Cenci's son, Giacomo, upset over Cenci's appropriation of Giacomo's wife's dowry, to murder Cenci.

Act III

Beatrice reveals to Lucretia that the Count has committed an unnameable act against her and expresses feelings of spiritual and physical contamination, implying Cenci's incestuous rape of his daughter. Orsino and Lucretia agree with Beatrice's suggestion that the Count must be murdered. After the first attempt at patricide fails because Cenci arrives early, Orsino conspires with Beatrice, Lucretia, and Giacomo, in a second assassination plot. Orsino proposes that two of Cenci's ill-treated servants, Marzio and Olimpio, carry out the murder.

Act IV

The scene shifts to the Petrella Castle in the Apulian Apennines. Olimpio and Marzio enter Cenci's bedchamber to murder him but hesitate to kill the sleeping Count and return to the conspirators with the deed undone. Threatening to kill Cenci herself, Beatrice shames the servants into action, and Olimpio and Marzio strangle the Count and throw his body out of the room off the balcony, where it is entangled in a pine. Shortly thereafter, Savella, a papal legate, arrives with a murder charge and execution order against Cenci. Upon finding the Count's dead body, the legate arrests the conspirators, with the exception of Orsino, who escapes in disguise.

Act V

The suspects are taken for trial for murder in Rome. Marzio is tortured and confesses to the murder, implicating Cenci's family members. Despite learning that Lucretia and Giacomo have also confessed, Beatrice refuses to do so, steadfastly insisting on her innocence. At the trial, all of the conspirators are found guilty and sentenced to death. Bernardo, another of Cenci's sons, attempts a futile last-minute appeal to the Pope to have mercy on his family. The Pope is reported to have declared: "They must die." The play concludes with Beatrice walking stoically to her execution for murder. Her final words are: "We are quite ready. Well, 'tis very well."

== Major characters ==
- Count Francesco Cenci, head of the Cenci household and family
- Beatrice, his daughter
- Lucretia, the wife of Francesco Cenci and the stepmother of his children
- Cardinal Camillo
- Orsino, a Prelate
- Savella, the Pope's Legate
- Andrea, a servant to Francesco Cenci
- Marzio, an assassin
- Olimpio, an assassin
- Giacomo, son of Francesco Cenci
- Bernardo, son of Francesco Cenci

== Performance history ==
=== England ===
The play was first staged in England by the Shelley Society in 1886. It did not receive its first public performance in England until 1922.

=== France ===
The play's second production in France was in 1891, directed by Lugnè-Poe at the Theatre d'Art.

==== Antonin Artaud adaptation ====
Antonin Artaud staged his adaptation Les Cenci in 1935 at the Théâtre des Folies-Wagram. The production closed after 17 performances due to poor reviews. Artaud staged the production in line with his theory for a Theatre of Cruelty, though he stated that it "is not Theatre of Cruelty yet, but is a preparation for it". Artaud drew on Shelley's text, as well as a version of the tale by Stendhal, and his adaptation "exaggerated the sadistic and pathological elements of the play to a point of violence".

== Critical reception ==
In his 15 May 1886 review of the play, Oscar Wilde concluded: "In fact no one has more clearly understood than Shelley the mission of the dramatist and the meaning of the drama." Alfred and H. Buxton Forman also praised The Cenci as a "tragic masterpiece", elevating Shelley into the company of Sophocles, Euripides, and Shakespeare. Leigh Hunt, to whom the play was dedicated, effused over Shelley's "great sweetness of nature, and enthusiasm for good". Mary Shelley, in her note on the play, wrote that "[u]niversal approbation soon stamped The Cenci as the best tragedy of modern times". She critically assessed act V: "The Fifth Act is a masterpiece. It is the finest thing he ever wrote, and may claim proud comparison not only with any contemporary, but preceding, poet." She noted that "Shelley wished The Cenci to be acted", intending the work, which she wrote was of "surpassing excellence", to be an acting play, not a "closet drama". Shelley sought unsuccessfully to have the play staged at Covent Garden.

Byron wrote his criticisms of the play in a letter to Shelley: "I read Cenci – but, besides that I think the subject essentially un-dramatic, I am not a great admirer of our old dramatists as models. I deny that the English have hitherto had a drama at all. Your Cenci, however, was a work of power and poetry." Byron told Thomas Medwin in conversation: "The Cenci is... perhaps the best tragedy modern times have produced." William Wordsworth reportedly called the play "the greatest tragedy of the age." After seeing a performance of the play in 1886, George Bernard Shaw commented that "Shelley and Shakespeare are the only dramatists who have dealt in despair of this quality."

A reviewer writing for the Literary Gazette in 1820, on the other hand, wrote that the play was "noxious", "odious", and "abominable". The taboo subjects of incest, patricide, and parricide, as well as the negative depiction of the Roman Catholic Church, however, prevented The Cenci from being staged publicly.

== Opera adaptations ==
German composer Berthold Goldschmidt composed an opera in three acts based on the Shelley play in 1949 entitled Beatrice Cenci with a libretto by Martin Esslin "after Shelley's verse drama The Cenci". The opera won first prize in the Festival of Britain opera competition in 1951. The opera was first performed in 1988. A critically lauded production starring Roberta Alexander as the title heroine was staged at the Opernfest in Berlin in 1994. The first staged production of Beatrice Cenci in the UK was by the Trinity College of Music on 9–11 July 1998.

In 1951, British classical composer Havergal Brian composed an opera based on the Shelley play entitled The Cenci, an opera in eight scenes. The opera premiered in 1997 in the UK in a performance in London by the Millennium Sinfonia conducted by James Kelleher..

In 1971, Beatrix Cenci premiered, an opera in two acts by Alberto Ginastera to a Spanish libretto by the playwright William Shand.

== Other works titled The Cenci ==
Other works titled The Cenci include an 1837 novella by Marie-Henri Beyle (Stendhal), and an 1840 true crime essay by Alexandre Dumas père included in Volume 1 of Celebrated Crimes.

== Productions of Shelley's The Cenci ==
- (1886) Grand Theatre, Islington, London, UK (private production)
- (1891) Paris, France
- (1919) Moscow, Russia
- (1920) Moscow, Russia
- (1922) Prague, Czechoslovakia
- (1922) New Theatre, London, UK
- (1926) London, UK
- (1933) Armenian Cultural Society of Los Angeles, California (in Armenian)
- (1935) People's Theatre, Newcastle, UK
- (1936) Yale University
- (1940) Bellingham, Washington
- (1947) Equity Library Theatre, New York
- (1947) BBC radio production
- (1948) BBC radio production
- (1948) Princeton University
- (1949) Mt. Holyoke College
- (1950) Walt Whitman School
- (1950) University of Utah
- (1953) Company of the Swan, London, UK
- (1953) Oxford, UK
- (1970) La MaMa Experimental Theatre Club, New York, NY
- (1975) Emerson College, Boston, Massachusetts
- (1977) Jean Cocteau Repertory, Bouwerie Lane Theater, New York
- (1982-83 season) London, UK, National Theatre of Great Britain
- (1985) Almeida Theatre, London, UK
- (1991) Lyric Studio, London, UK
- (1992) Red Heel Theatre at Studio 5, Walnut Street Theater, Philadelphia, PA
- (1995) Spotlighter's Theatre, Baltimore, Maryland
- (1995) Elmhurst College, Elmhurst, IL
- (1997) North Pole Theatre, Greenwich, London, UK
- (1997) The Swinish Multitude (with London University Theatre Company), Westminster, London, UK
- (1997) El Teatro Campesino, San Juan Bautista, California
- (2001) People's Theatre, Newcastle upon Tyne, UK
- (2003) Hayman Theatre, Perth, Western Australia
- (2005) The Lizard Loft and Cruel Theatre, Honolulu, Hawaii
- (2008) University of Guelph, Ontario, Canada
- (2008) Vassar College, New York
- (2008) Red Bull Theater, Theatre at St. Clement's, New York
- (2008) Shakespeare Performance Troupe, Bryn Mawr College, Pennsylvania
- (2009) Mestno gledališče ljubljansko, Ljubljana, Slovenia (in Slovenian)
- (2010) The National Moravian-Silesian Theatre, Antonin Dvorak Theatre, Ostrava, Czech Republic
- (2010) East Los Angeles College, Monterey Park, California
- (2011) Beijing Fringe Festival (in Chinese)
- (2019) Amitis Theater Group, Nufel Lushato Theater, Tehran (in Persian)
- (2019) Western University, London, Ontario, Canad
- (2026) Red Bull Theater, Symphony Space, Leonard Nimoy Thalia, New York

== Notes and references ==
Notes
