= Elizabeth Azcona Cranwell =

Argentine poet, storyteller, writer, translator and literary critic

- Born: 10 March 1933 Buenos Aires, Argentina
- Died: 2 December 2004 (aged 71) Buenos Aires, Argentina
- Occupation: Poet, storyteller, writer, translator, and literary critic
- Language: Spanish
- Genre: Surrealism

Elizabeth Azcona Cranwell (10 March 1933 – 2 December 2004) was an Argentine poet, storyteller, writer, translator, and literary critic. She was born and died in Buenos Aires, Argentina. She was on the faculty of Philosophy and Letters at the University of Buenos Aires. She was a teacher, teaching workshops and seminars. She was also a literary critic for the newspaper La Nación and a translator. She translated the poems of William Shand, the collected poems of Dylan Thomas, and the tales of Edgar Allan Poe.

Azcona Cranwell was the "poeta hermana" of Alejandra Pizarnik, and a contemporary of Joaquín Giannuzzi and Maria Elena Walsh. She was the 1984 Konex Award laureate.

== Selected works ==
- 1955 - "Capítulo sin presencia"
- 1956 - "La vida disgregada"
- 1963 - "Los riesgos y el vacío"
- 1966 - "De los opuestos"
- 1971 - "Imposibilidad del lenguaje o los nombres del amor"
- 1971 - "La vuelta de los equinoccios"
- 1978 - "Anunciación del mal y la inocencia"
- "El mandato"
- 1987 - "Las moradas del sol"
- 1990 - "El escriba de la mirada fija"
- "La mordedura"
- 1997 - "El reino intermitente"
