= Laura Hirtzel Powell =

Welsh diarist (1828–1901)

- Born: 1828; Colyton, Devon
- Died: December 24, 1901 (aged 72–73); Aberystwyth

Laura Hirtzel Powell (1828–1901) was a Welsh diarist and aunt of the antiquary George Eyre Evans. Her diaries provide the most comprehensive account of life in nineteenth-century Carmarthen.

== Early life ==
Laura Hirtzel Powell was born in 1828, the third child of Commander George Eyre Powell (1790–1855) of Colyton, Devon and Catherine Kingdon.

== Diarist ==
Powell kept a daily diary for 60 years. The diaries give an insight into the life of a nineteenth-century educated, unmarried middle-class woman and provide a comprehensive account of a family guided by religious and moral values.

== Personal life ==
Laura Hirtzel Powell moved to Carmarthen in 1864.

She never married but raised her sister's children after her death. Laura's older sister Ophelia Catherine Powell (1823–1866) married David Lewis Evans (1813–1902), who was the minister of the Unitarian church in Colyton. They had four children, including George Eyre Evans. Ophelia died in Carmarthen in February 1866.

Powell was close friends with the artist Sarah Doidge, who requested to be buried next to her.

== Death ==
Laura Hirtzel Powell died on 24 December 1901 in Aberystwyth. She was buried in Alltyblaca Chapel Yard, and her brother-in-law, David Lewis Evans, was buried beside her upon his death the following year. George Eyre Evans's ashes are scattered at the same graveyard.

== Legacy ==
Laura Hirtzel Powell's letters and postcards to her nephew George Eyre Evans were donated to the Llyfrgell Genedlaethol Cymru.

An alphabet cross stitch sampler believed to have been created by Laura Hirtzel Powell c. 1846 or c. 1848 was donated to Carmarthenshire Museum by George Eyre Evans.
