= Sarah A. Doidge =

British painter (1836–1911)

- Born: 1836; Devonport, Devon
- Died: November 28, 1911; Aberystwyth

Sarah A. Doidge (1836–1911) was a British landscape painter who worked in oil and watercolour.

== Early life ==
Sarah A. Doidge was born in Devonport, Devon in 1836, where she showed an early talent for drawing. When she was young, her family moved to the Surrey area. She attended the Royal Female School of Art, where she trained in painting oil and watercolour.

She worked teaching drawing in Mentmore and as a personal tutor to Hannah Rothschild. During this time, she met the Prince of Wales, future King Edward.

== Career ==
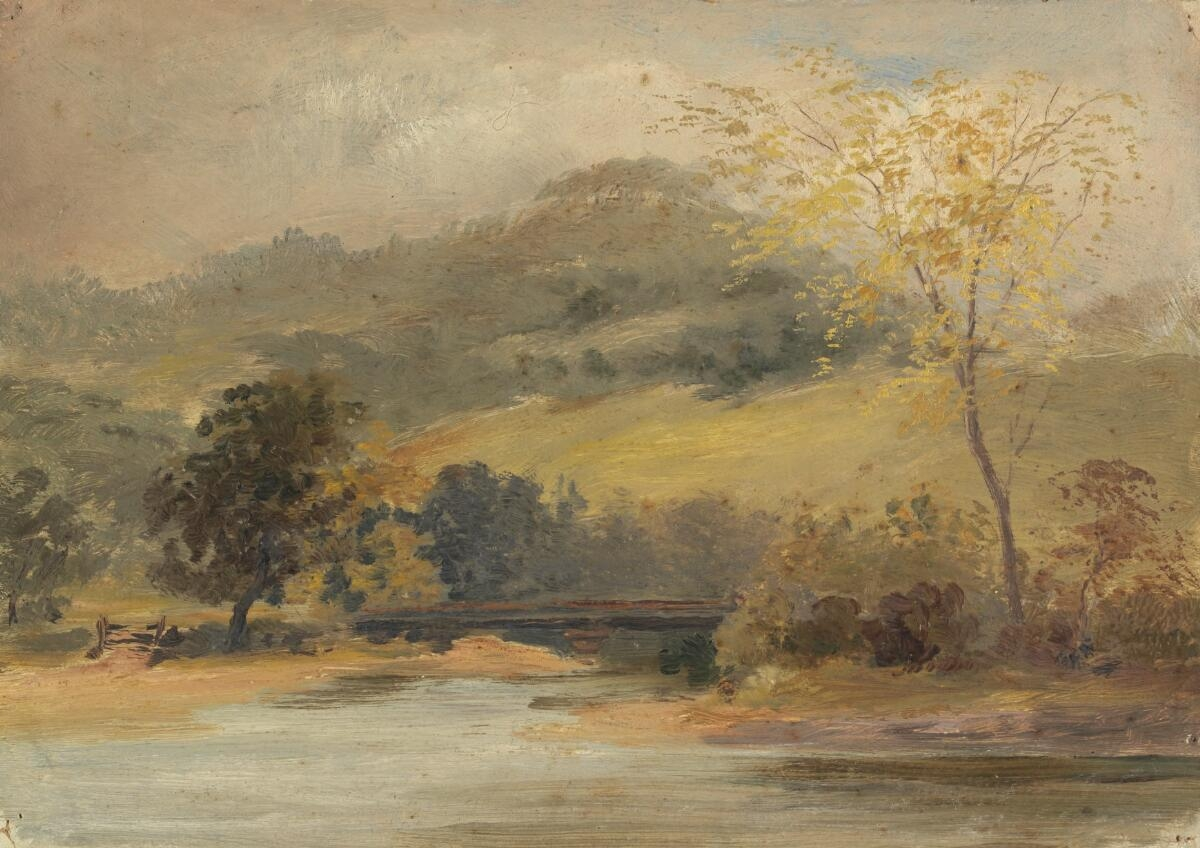
Bridge over water (c. 1880) by Sarah A. Doidge

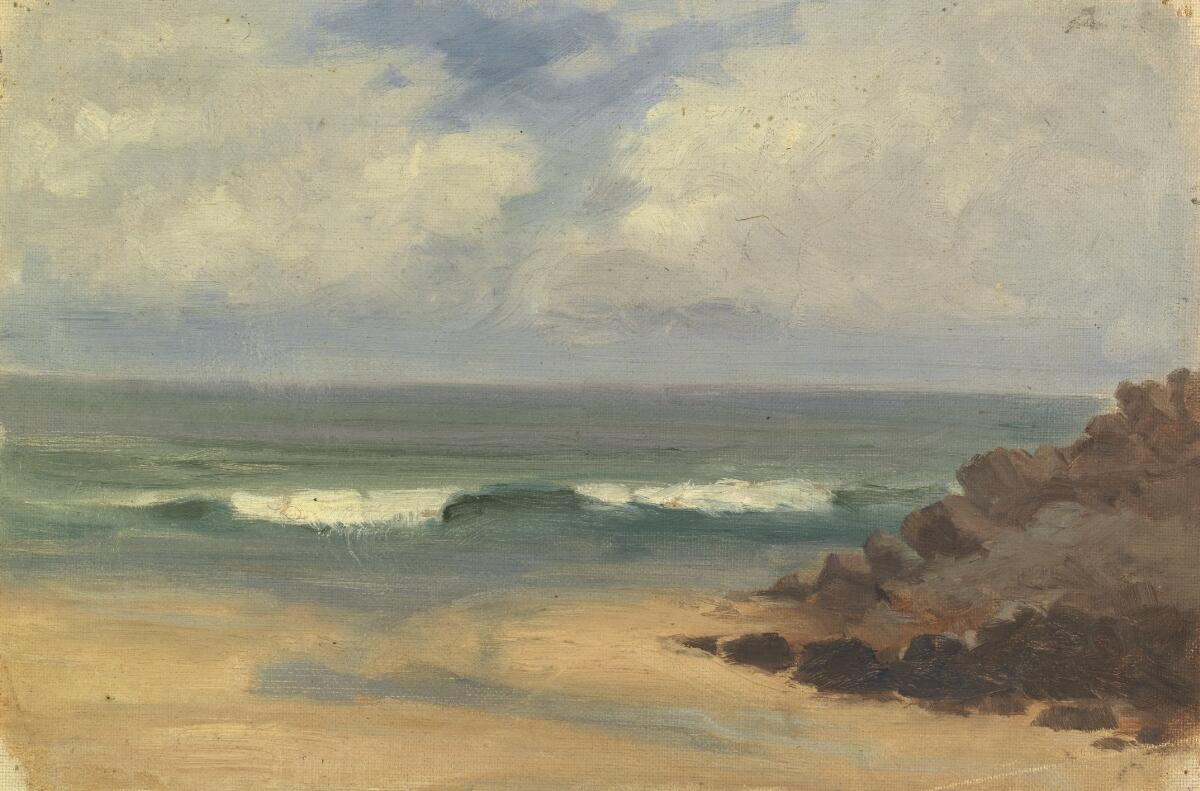
Sea from a sandy beach (c. 1880) by Sarah A. Doidge

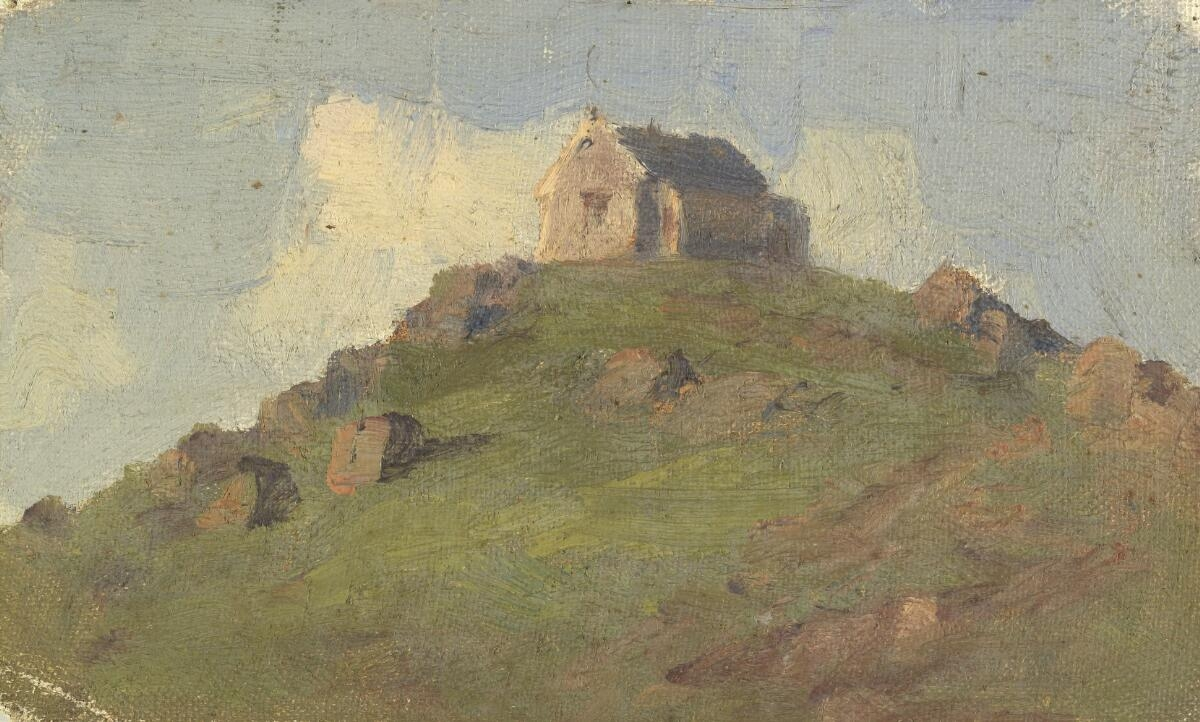
Building on a hill (c. 1880) by Sarah A. Doidge

Doidge was active as a painter between 1859 and 1901. She painted from drawings she made while travelling in Britain and western Europe. Doidge exhibited at the Royal Academy, the Royal Society of British Artists, the Walker Art Gallery and the Society of Women Artists. Her work is owned by Llyfrgell Genedlaethol Cymru and Aberystwyth University.

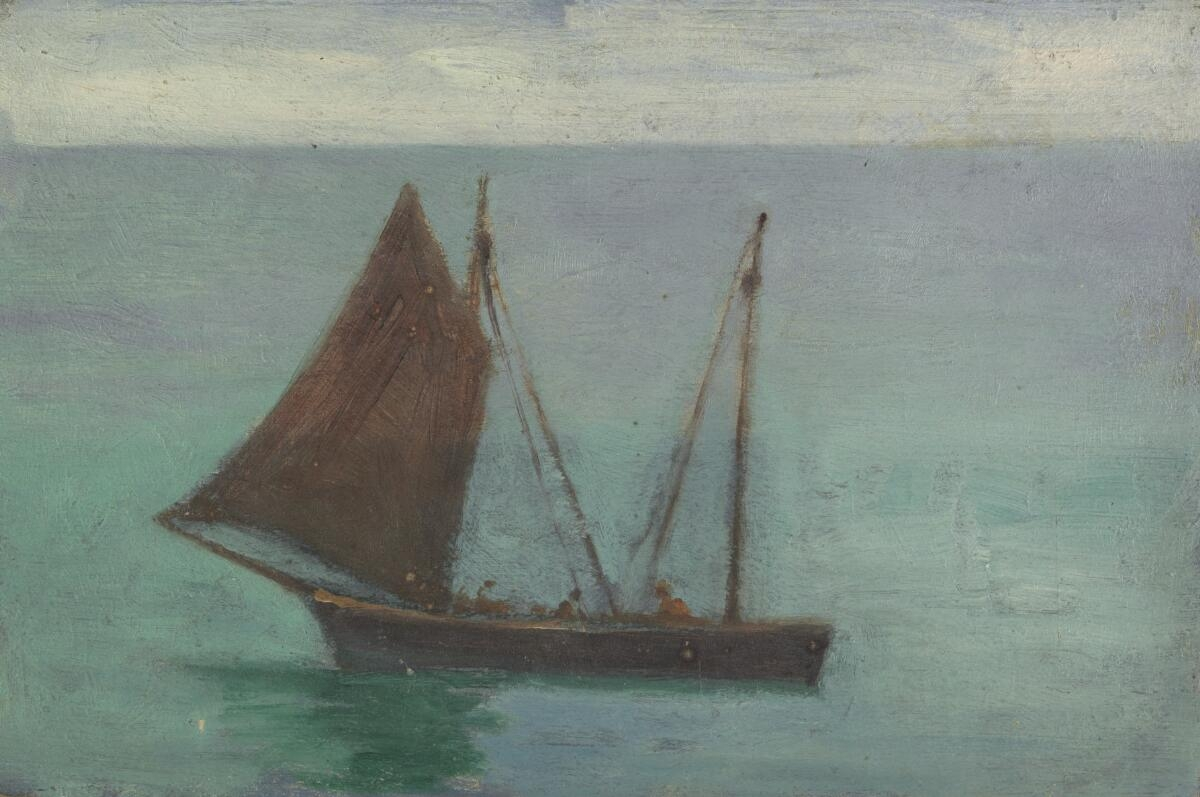
Boat on the sea (c. 1890) by Sarah A. Doidge

== Personal life ==
From the 1880s, she lived in London, followed by a period of travel, after which spent summers in Aberdyfi and winters in Aberystwyth.

Doidge was a Unitarian and friends with Charles Darwin.

She died in Aberystwyth on 28 November 1911, aged 75, at a friend's home. She asked to be buried in Alltyblaca, near to her close friend Laura Hirtzel Powell, aunt of the antiquary George Eyre Evans.

== Legacy ==
A service was held at the Alltyblaca Unitarian Chapel to commemorate 99 years since her death.
