= Portrait of Beatrice Cenci =

Painting formally attributed to Guido Reni, now to Ginevra Cantofoli

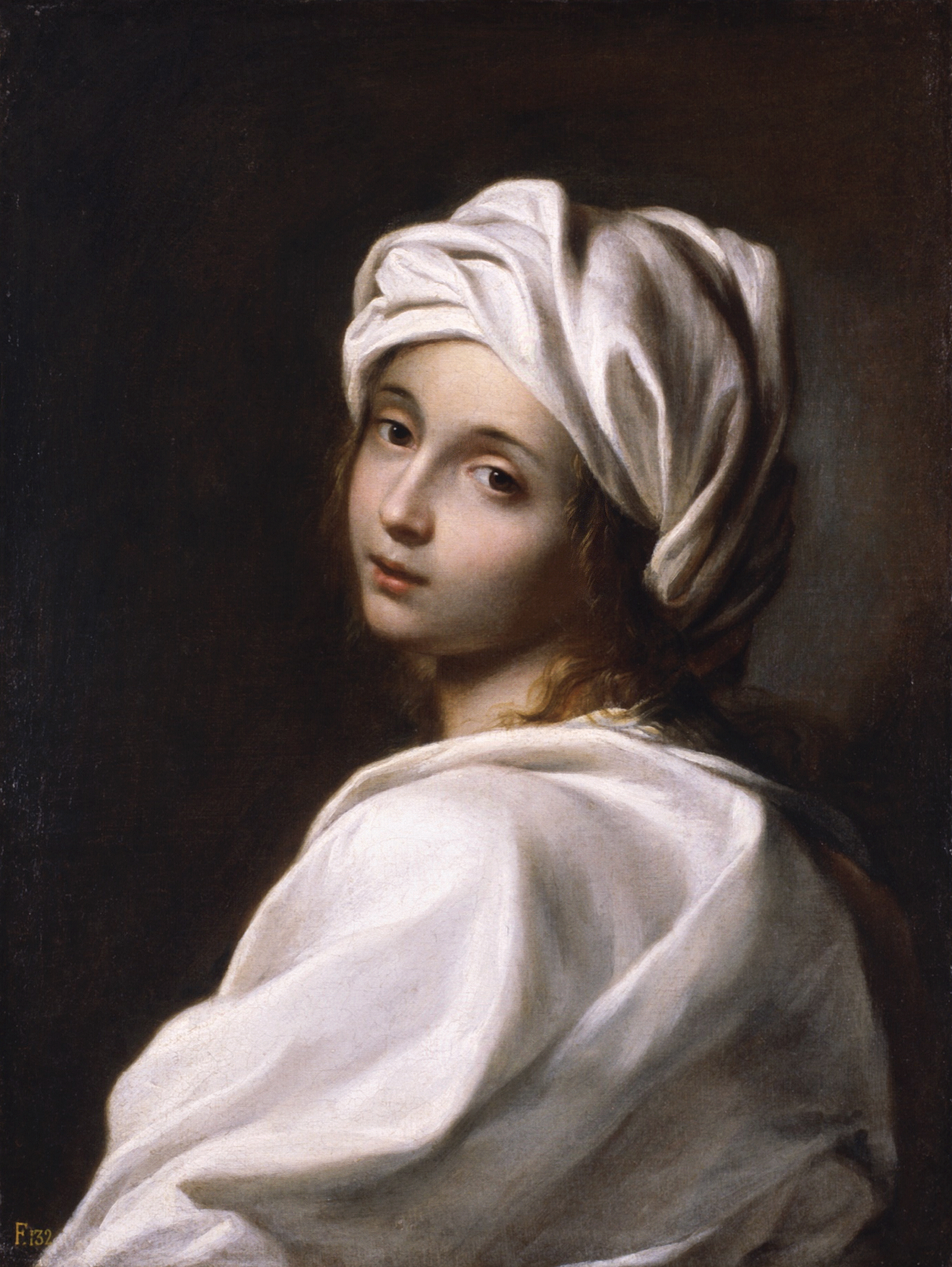
- Artist: Ginevra Cantofoli
- Year: circa 1600
- Medium: Oil on canvas
- Dimensions: 75 cm × 50 cm (30 in × 20 in)
- Location: Galleria Nazionale d'Arte Antica; Rome

The Portrait of Beatrice Cenci is a painting once attributed to the Italian Baroque painter Guido Reni but now to Ginevra Cantofoli. It is housed in the Galleria Nazionale d'Arte Antica of Palazzo Barberini, Rome. The painting dealt with a controversial topic of Beatrice Cenci, a woman who was executed by Papal authorities, specifically Pope Clement VIII Aldobrandini.

== Description ==
The author of this work has been highly debated, with many previous critics assigning the work to Elisabetta Sirani, and categorizing as a statement by a 17th-century feminist. She is depicted in the white robes of a Roman Sybil or perhaps a vestal virgin, evoking sympathy. She looks back melancholic at an angle backward. Tradition holds that she painted the work for the Cardinal Ascanio Colonna. The work has inspired many romantic artists including Stendhal, Percy Shelley, Dumas, Artaud, and Guerrazzi. There has been significant debate over the authorship and its influence. Traditions with no factual documentation claim Reni entered her cell the day prior to the execution, or saw her on the way to the scaffold. Others claim he was not even in Rome at that date. The earliest Barberini catalogue states it likely depicts the Cenci girl by an unknown painter. A later one attributes the work to Reni, but in the 2021 Barberini/Corsini book attribution is now to Cantofoli (albeit with a question mark).

Harry Levin describes it as "...rumored to have been painted shortly before her execution, was the most widely admired and the most commonly reproduced picture of the day. Pilgrims sought it out with a curiosity which could only be compared to the subsequent and slightly more sophisticated vogue of that femme fatale, the "Mona Lisa". "The History is written in the Painting," Charles Dickens had responded to it in his Pictures from Italy, "written, in the dying girl's face, by Nature's own hand.""
