= Beatrice Cenci =

Roman noblewoman (1577–1599)

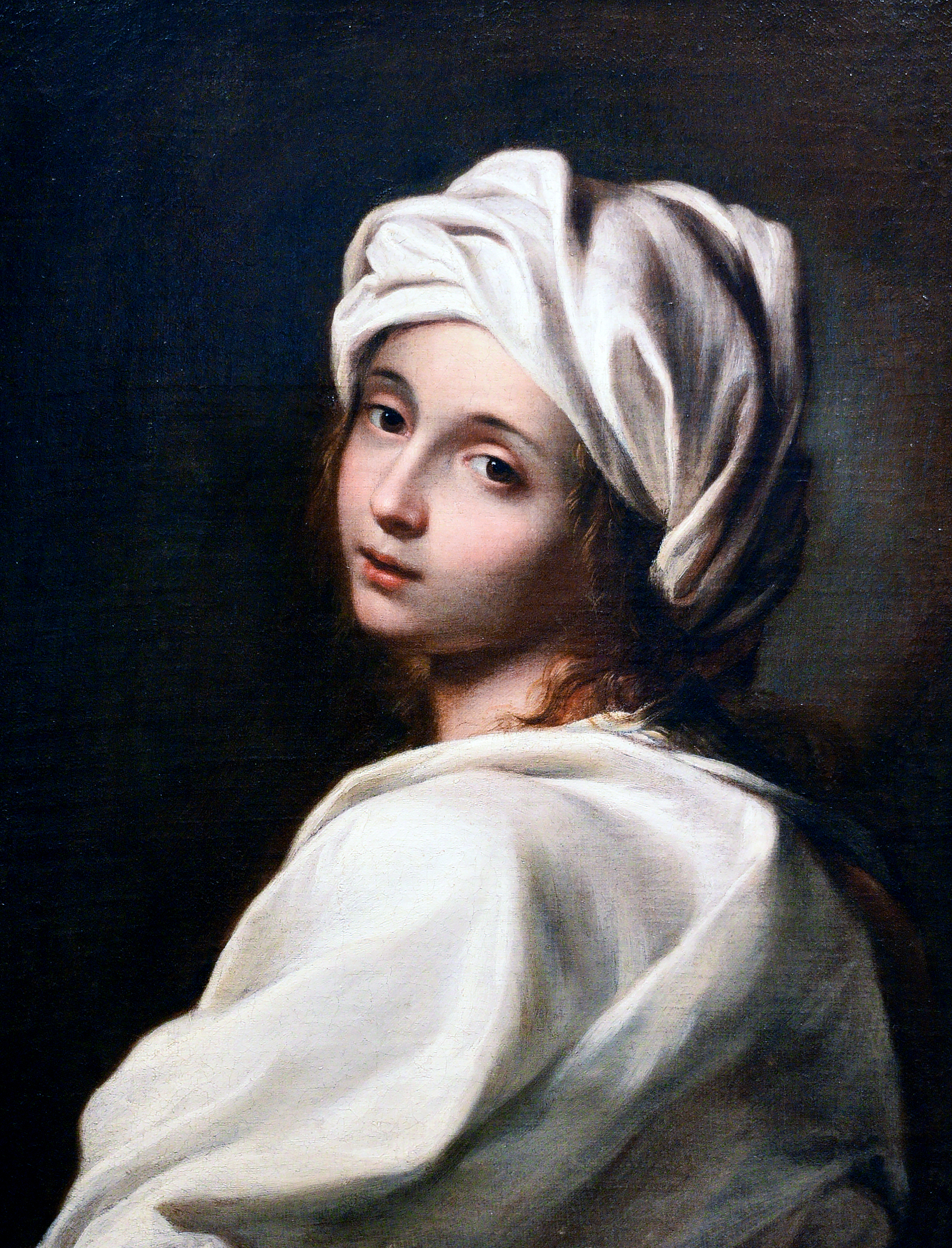
- A possible portrait of Cenci variously attributed to Reni or Sirani, supposedly from life, (Note: In fact, Reni would not have been in Rome at the time of her trial and the portrait is more likely intended to represent a sibyl.) praised by Stendhal, Dickens, and Hawthorne and inspiring Shelley's verse play of her life.
- Born: 6 February 1577; Rome, Papal States
- Died: 11 September 1599 (aged 22); Rome, Papal States
- Cause of death: Execution by beheading
- Resting place: San Pietro in Montorio, Rome, Italy
- Parent(s): Ersilia Santacroce (mother); Count Francesco Cenci (father)

Beatrice Cenci (/ˈtʃɛntʃi/ CHEN-chee; Italian: [beaˈtriːtʃe ˈtʃɛntʃi]; 6 February 1577 – 11 September 1599) was an Italian noblewoman imprisoned and repeatedly raped by her own father. She killed him, and was tried for murder. Despite outpourings of public sympathy, Cenci was beheaded in 1599 after a murder trial in Rome that gave rise to an enduring legend.

== Life ==
Beatrice was the daughter of Ersilia Santacroce and Count Francesco Cenci, a "man of great wealth but dissolute habits and violent temper". When Beatrice was seven years old, in June 1584, her mother died. After her mother's death, Beatrice and her elder sister Antonina were sent to a small monastery, Santa Croce, a Montecitorio for Franciscan Tertiary nuns in the rione Colonna of Rome.

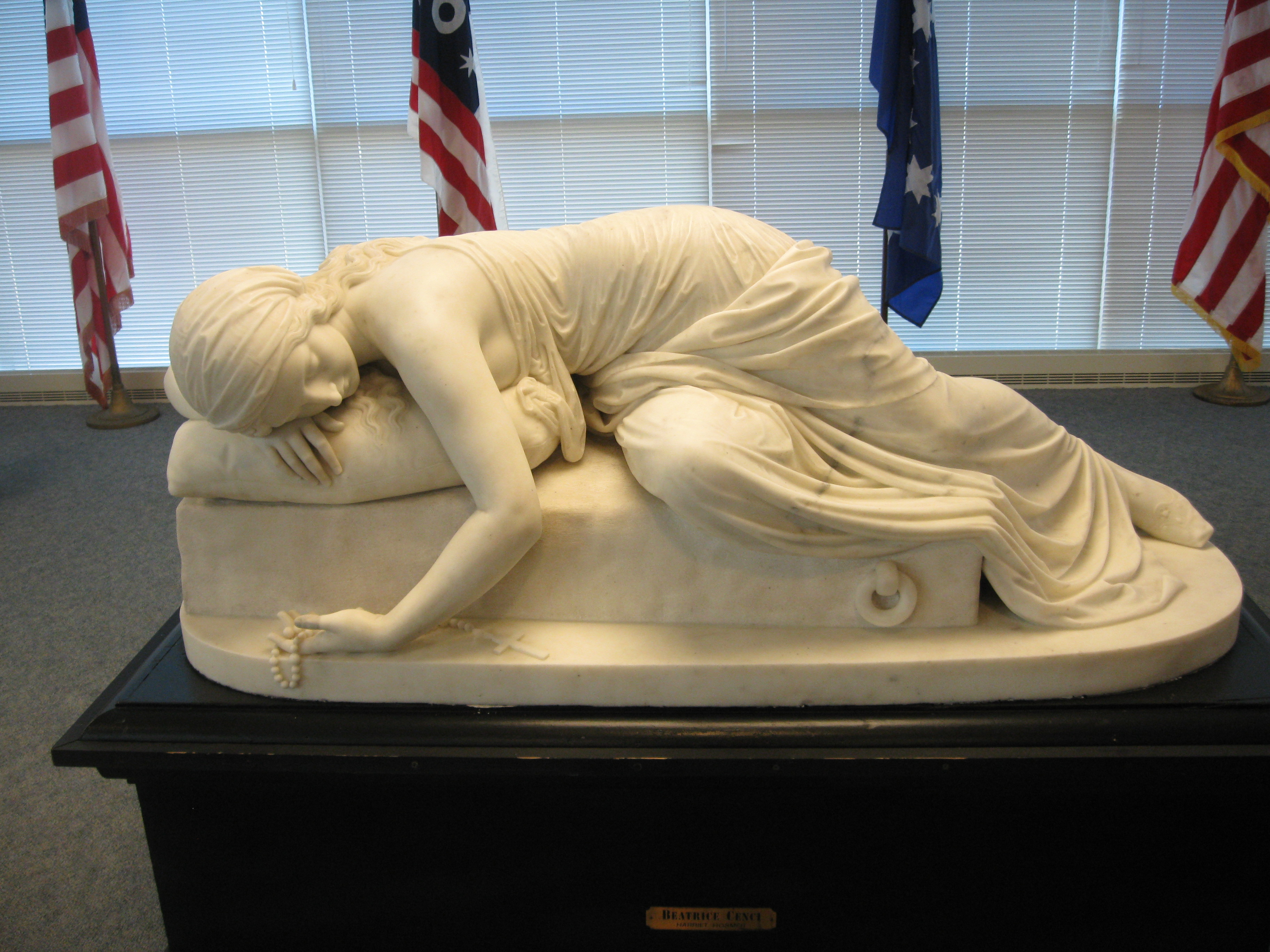
H. G. Hosmer: Beatrice Cenci

The family lived in Rome at the Palazzo Cenci in the rione Regola. The members of the extended family living together included Count Francesco's second wife, Lucrezia Petroni; Beatrice's elder brother, Giacomo; and Bernardo, Francesco's son from his second marriage. They also possessed a castle, La Rocca of Petrella Salto, a small village in the Abruzzi mountains northeast of Rome.

According to legend, Francesco Cenci abused his first wife Ersilia Santa Croce and his sons and repeatedly raped Beatrice. He was jailed for other crimes, but was freed early because of his noble status. Beatrice tried to inform the authorities about his abusive behaviour, but no effective action was taken. When he found out that his daughter had reported him, he sent Beatrice and Lucrezia away from Rome to live in the family's castle at La Petrella del Salto.

The four Cencis decided they had no alternative but to try to get rid of Count Francesco, and together organized a plot. In 1598, during one of Francesco's stays at the castle, two vassals (one of whom had become Beatrice's secret lover) helped them to drug him. Beatrice, her siblings, and their stepmother then bludgeoned Francesco to death with a hammer and threw the body off a balcony to make it look like an accident.

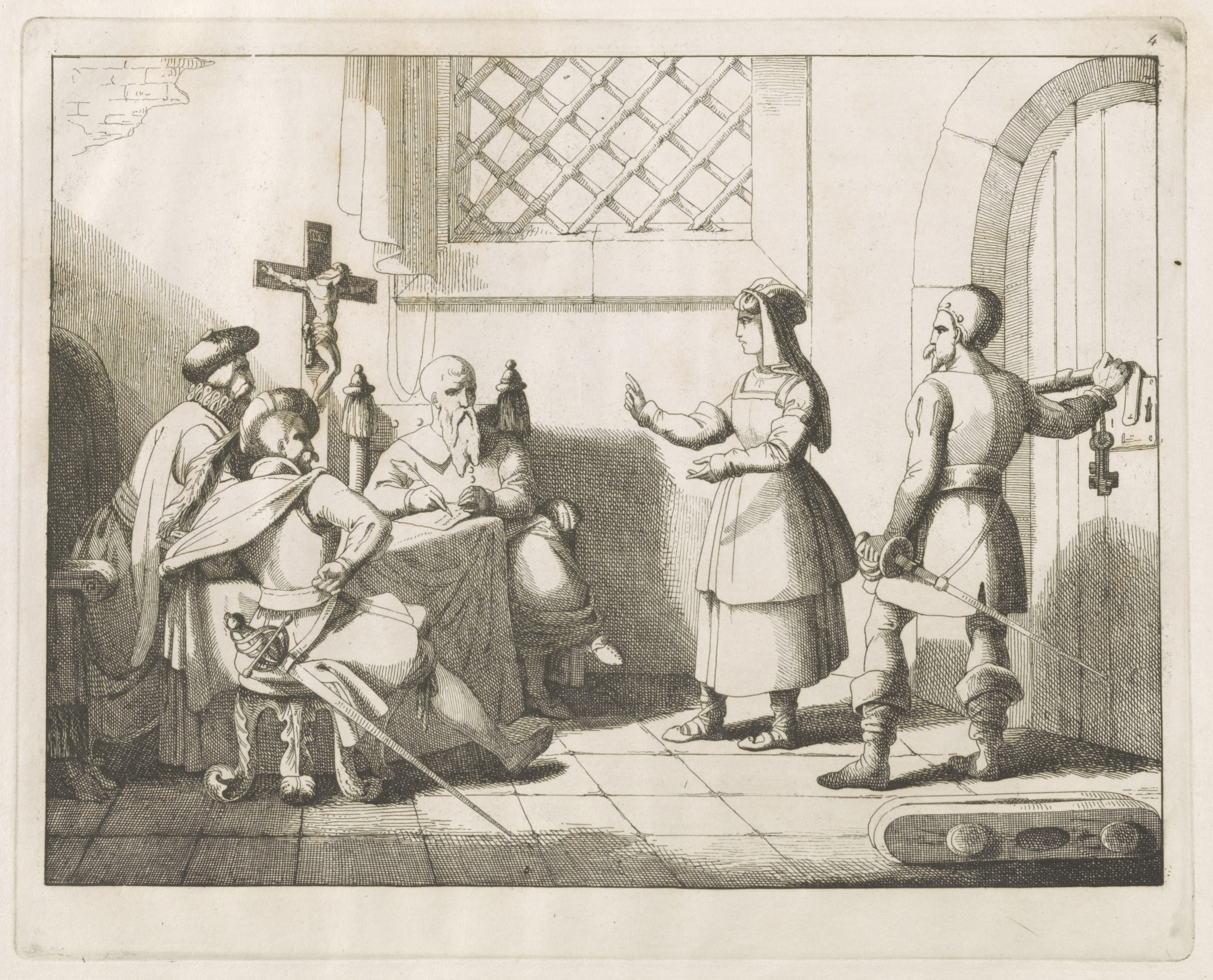
From an Italian series of prints, 1870

Eventually, his absence was noticed, and the papal police investigated. Beatrice's lover was tortured and died without revealing the truth. Meanwhile, a family friend who was aware of the murder ordered the killing of the second vassal to avoid any risk. Nonetheless, the plot was discovered, and the four members of the Cenci family were arrested, found guilty, and sentenced to death. The investigation into Francesco Cenci's death revealed key details, such as the involvement of Marzio Floriani and Olimpio Calvetti, and the initial attempt to stage the murder as an accident. This led to intense judicial scrutiny, including the torture and forced confessions of the accused under Pope Clement VIII's directive, highlighting the era's harsh judicial practices.

Knowing the reasons for the murder, the common people of Rome protested against the tribunal's decision, obtaining a short postponement of the execution. Pope Clement VIII, however, fearing a spate of familial murders (the Countess of Santa Croce had recently been murdered by her son for financial gain), showed no mercy.

At dawn on 11 September 1599, they were taken to Sant'Angelo Bridge, where the scaffold was usually built. In the cart to the scaffold, Giacomo was subjected to continual torture. On reaching the scaffold, his head was smashed with a mallet. His corpse was then quartered. The public spectacle continued with the executions of Lucrezia and then Beatrice. Each took her turn on the block to be beheaded with a small axe. Only the 12-year-old Bernardo was spared, but he was led to the scaffold and forced to witness the execution of his relatives before returning to prison and having his properties confiscated (to be given to the Pope's own family). It was decreed that Bernardo should then become a galley slave for the remainder of his life. However, he was released a year later. Beatrice was buried in the church of San Pietro in Montorio.

== The legend ==
Beatrice has become a symbol to the people of Rome of resistance against the arrogant aristocracy. It is related that every year on the night before the anniversary of her death, she comes back to the Sant'Angelo Bridge where she was executed, carrying her severed head in her hands.

== Influence on literature and the arts ==
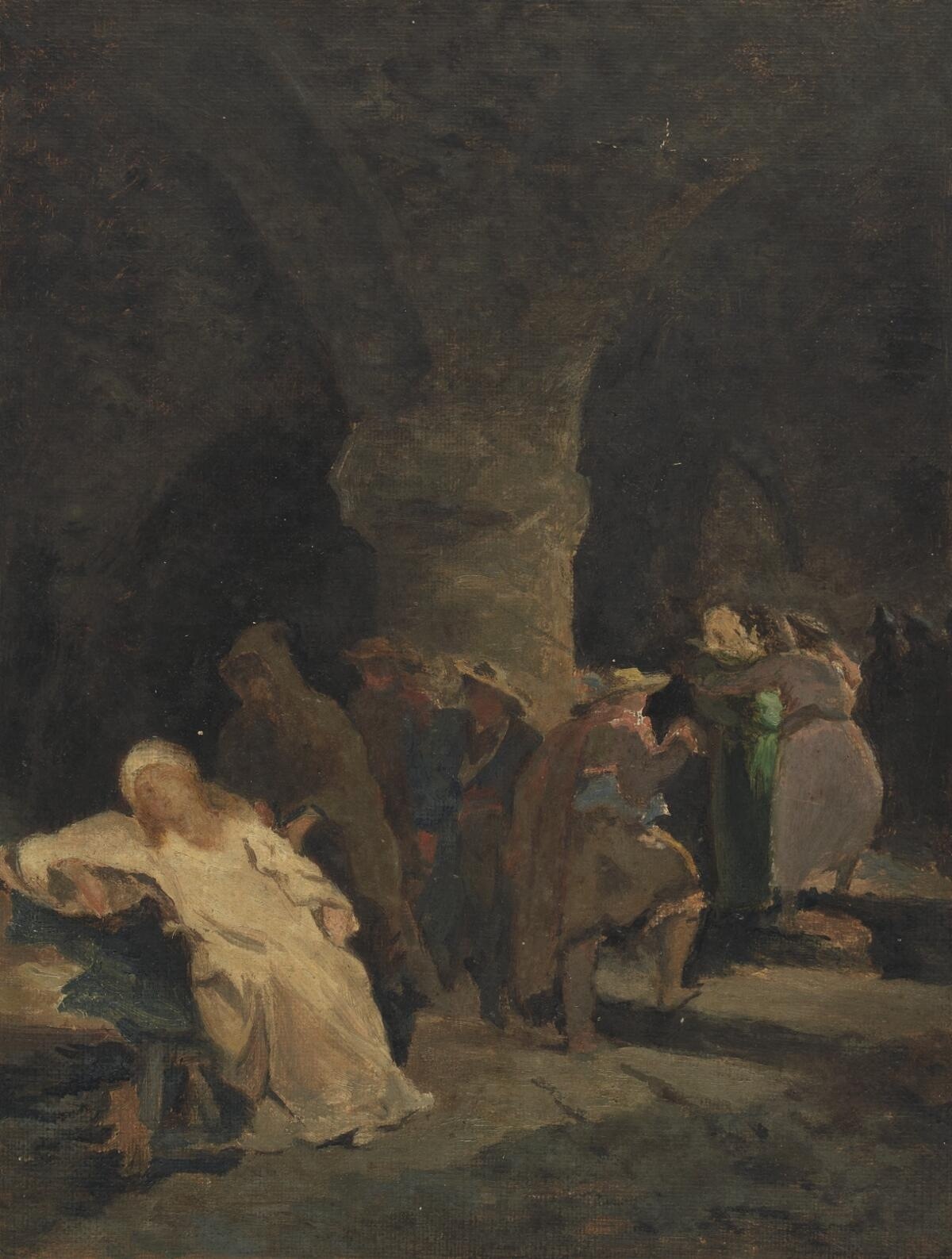
Beatrice Cenci after the rack by Sarah A. Doidge about 1890. National Library of Wales.

Beatrice Cenci has been the subject of a number of literary and musical works:

- Philip Massinger's play The Unnatural Combat (c.1619) contains specific echoes of the case and antedates the Romantic revival of Beatrice by 200 years
- Percy Bysshe Shelley's verse drama The Cenci: A Tragedy in Five Acts (composed at Rome and at Villa Valsovano near Livorno, May–5 August 1819, published spring 1820 by C. & J. Ollier, London, 1819)
- "Les Cenci", a short story by Stendhal (1837)
- Béatrix Cenci, a verse drama (1839), by Polish poet, Juliusz Słowacki
- Beatrice Cenci, a novel by Francesco Domenico Guerrazzi (1854)
- "Beatrice Cenci (In a City Shop-Window)" (1871), a poem by Sarah Morgan Bryan Piatt, American poet
- Béatrix Cenci, by Astolphe de Custine
- Nemesis, tragedy by Alfred Nobel
- Beatrice Cenci, a play by Alberto Moravia (1958), trans. Angus Davidson (1965)
- Beatriz Cenci, a verse drama by Gonçalves Dias
- Beatrix Cenci, opera by Alberto Ginastera, based on the Shelley play
- Beatrice Cenci, opera by Berthold Goldschmidt, based on the Shelley play
- Les Cenci (1935), play by Antonin Artaud, adaptation of the Shelley play
- The Cenci, essay by Alexandre Dumas in Volume 1 of Celebrated Crimes (1840)
- Legende und Wahrheit der Beatrice Cenci (1926) by Stefan Zweig
- The Cenci (1951–52), an opera by Havergal Brian (abridged from Shelley's play)
- The Cenci Family (2004), a radio play by Lizzie Hopley directed by Lu Kemp
- Beatrice Cenci (2006), musical drama by Alessandro Londei and Brunella Caronti
- Béatrice Cenci : Telle une fleur coupée, a novel by Jean Rocchi, editor Esmeralda (10 May 2004)
- "Finis the Cenci" (1954), a 17-line poem by F. R. Scott in Events and Signals; also in his Selected Poems (1966) and Collected Poems (1981)
- A Tale for Midnight (1955), a novel by Frederic Prokosch
- the Canadian opera Beatrice Chancy, written by George Elliott Clarke and James Rolfe (and inspired by the Shelley play), transplants the story to nineteenth-century Nova Scotia.
- 11 settembre 1599, A Beatrice Cenci , a piece in poetic prose by Sabrina Gatti (Italian writer), in Il trono dei poveri (2020)
- The Big Finish Productions Doctor Who audio drama "Theatre of Cruelty", part of the Ninth Doctor box set Buried Threats, starring Christopher Eccleston (2024) is set around the story of Beatrice Cenci.
- Sinners (2025), a novel by Elizabeth Fremantle; Cenci's execution also features in Fremantle's earlier novel, Disobedient (2023) about Artemisia Gentileschi.

Statues, paintings, and photography also provide numerous portraits and homages to Beatice Cenci: The Italian painter Caravaggio witnessed Beatrice's public execution and may have used it as inspiration for the decapitation scene in his painting Judith Beheading Holofernes.

A statue by American sculptor Harriet Goodhue Hosmer entitled Beatrice Cenci (1857) is on display at the Mercantile Library on the University of Missouri–St. Louis campus in St. Louis, Missouri.

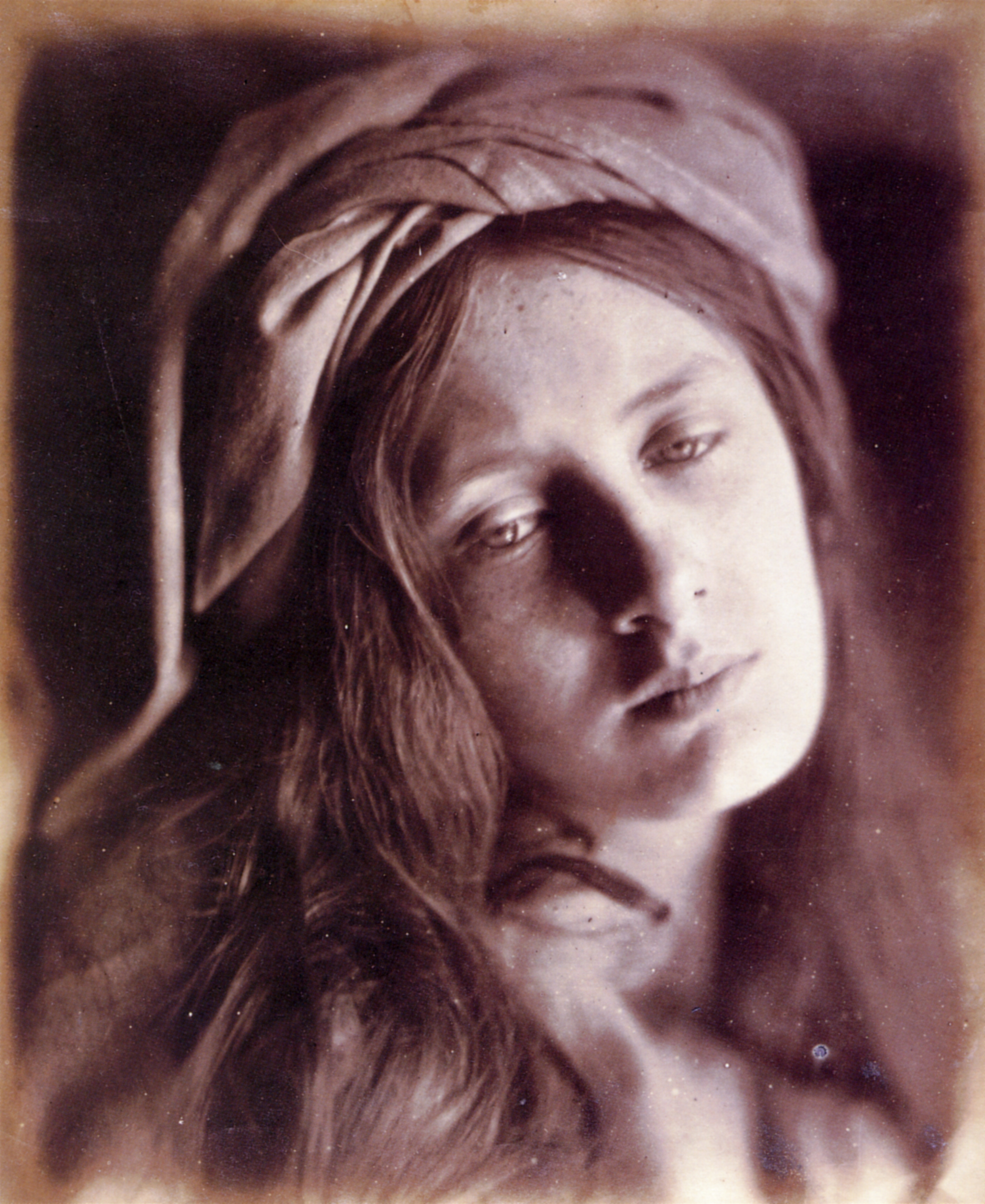
"Beatrice Cenci" (1866), a study for a photographic series devoted to Cenci by Julia Margaret Cameron

The early photographer Julia Margaret Cameron posed her model, May Prinsep, as Beatrice in an 1866 albumen print portrait among a series she devoted to Beatrice Cenci.

The possible portrait of Beatrice Cenci by Baroque painter Guido Reni (1575–1642) and the legend surrounding Beatrice figure prominently in Nathaniel Hawthorne's The Marble Faun (1860). The book's two principal female characters, Hilda and Miriam, debate the nature and extent of Beatrice's guilt. Hilda believes Beatrice's act to be an "inexpiable crime" but Miriam believes it was "no sin at all, but the best possible virtue in the circumstances". Hawthorne draws many similarities between Miriam and Beatrice, and the reader must decide whether Miriam is an avenger or a culprit.

In Letitia Elizabeth Landon's short story "The Bride of Lindorf" (1836), the main character has an emotional attachment to the painting of Beatrice Cenci.

The Reni painting and the story of Beatrice figure in the plot of Liza Marklund's novel Last Will (2006). The painting also figures in Book 26 of Herman Melville's novel Pierre; or, The Ambiguities (1852).

Films have been inspired by the life of Beatrice Cenci also:

In David Lynch's film Mulholland Dr. (2001), Reni's painting is shown hanging in the Hollywood apartment of Ruth Elms as a reference to Cenci.

The 1969 Italian film Beatrice Cenci, directed by Lucio Fulci starring Adrienne La Russa in the title role, follows the historical events of her life very closely. Fulci claimed it was one of his favorite works, though he was better known for his gruesome horror films. It was also distributed under the title The Conspiracy of Torture.

The character played by Mia Farrow in the film Secret Ceremony is named Cenci, in reference to the Beatrice legend.

== Gallery of portraits ==
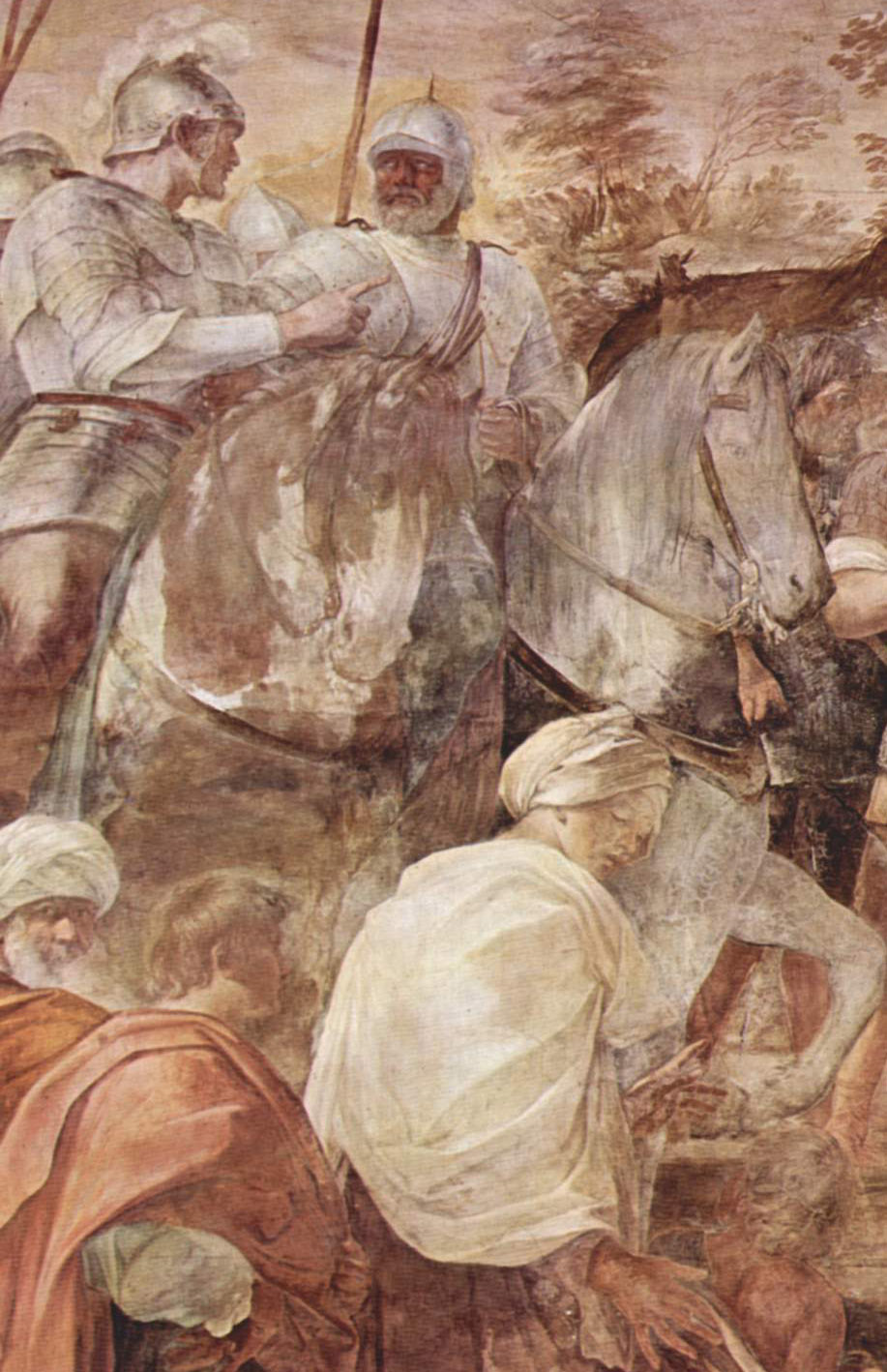
Guido Reni - Martyrium des Hl. Andreas. 1608. San Gregorio al Celio, Rome.

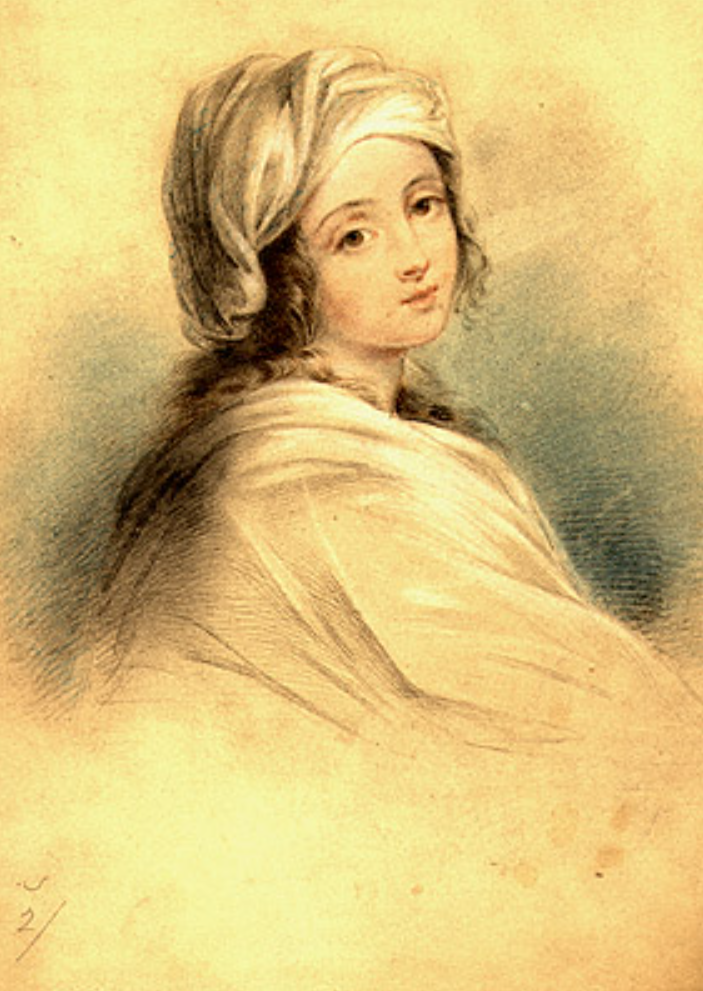
Henry Brocas Senior - Portrait of Beatrice Cenci (pastel and pencil on paper), between ca. 1782 and 1837. National Library of Ireland.

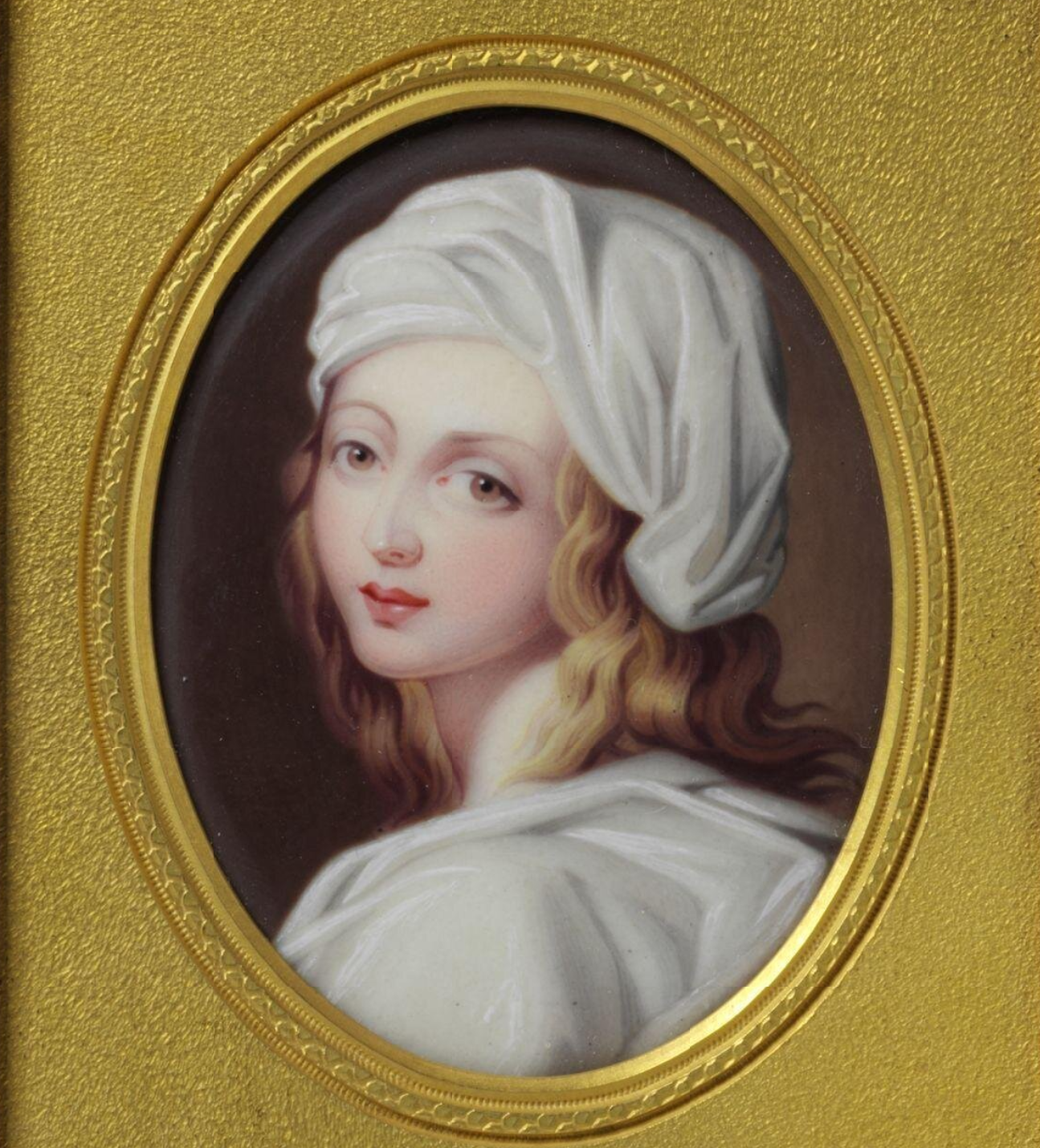
Anonymous - Portrait of Beatrice Cenci (enamel on metal), 1842. Victoria and Albert Museum, London.

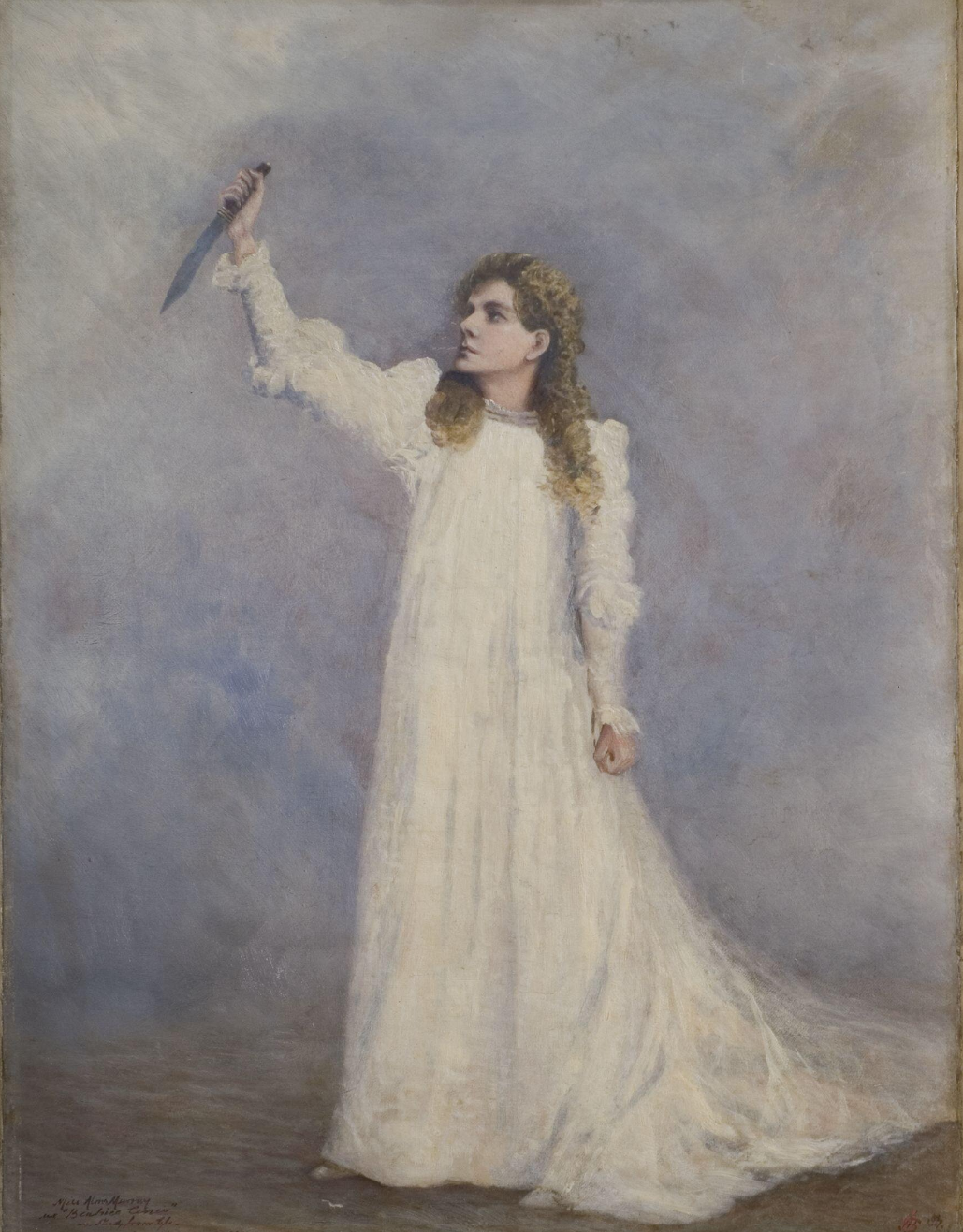
Hal Mansfield Murray - 'Alma Murray as Beatrice Cenci in 'The Cenci' by Percy Bysshe Shelley' (oil on canvas), 1887. Victoria and Albert Museum.

== See also ==
- Tochigi patricide case
- List of people executed in the Papal States

== Notes ==
=== Bibliography ===
- Chisholm, Hugh, ed. (1911). "Cenci, Beatrice" . Encyclopædia Britannica. Vol. 5 (11th ed.). Cambridge University Press. pp. 660–661.
- Guarazzi, Francesco Domenico. Beatrice Cenci (in Italian).
- Nicholl, Charles (2 July 1998). "Screaming in the Castle: The Case of Beatrice Cenci". London Review of Books. Vol. 20, no. 13.
