= Nemesis (Nobel play) =

1896 tragedy by Alfred Nobel

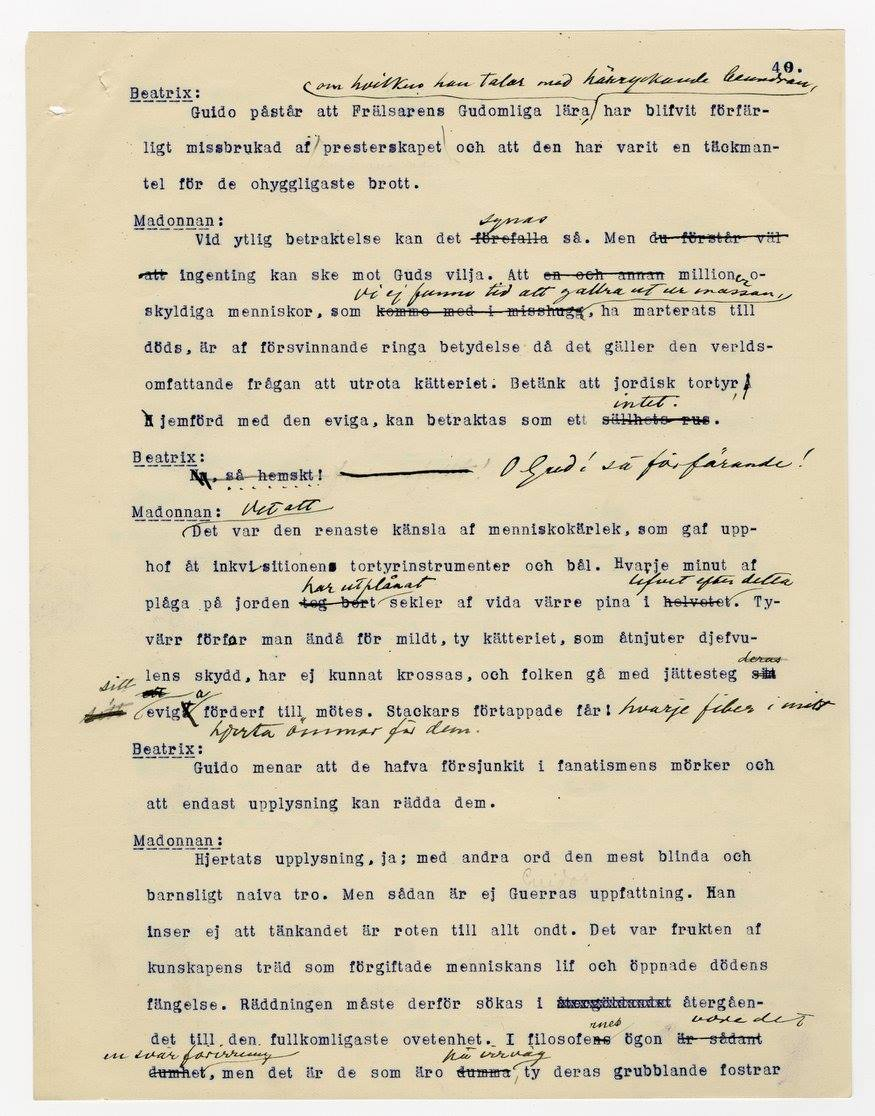
A page from Nobel's manuscript for Nemesis.

Nemesis is a French tragedy in four acts written by Alfred Nobel, who founded the Nobel Prizes. The play is based on the story of Beatrice Cenci, an Italian noblewoman, who was executed after a plot to murder her father in 1599.

The play was written shortly before his death in 1896 and printed while he was dying. Following Nobel's death, the entire printed edition was destroyed, except for three copies. The first surviving edition (bilingual Swedish–Esperanto) was published in Sweden in 2003 and in 2010 it was published in a bilingual Russian–Esperanto edition.

The first, and so far the only, production of the play was at the Intima theatre in Stockholm in 2005.
