= George Eyre Evans =

Welsh antiquarian and minister (1857–1939)

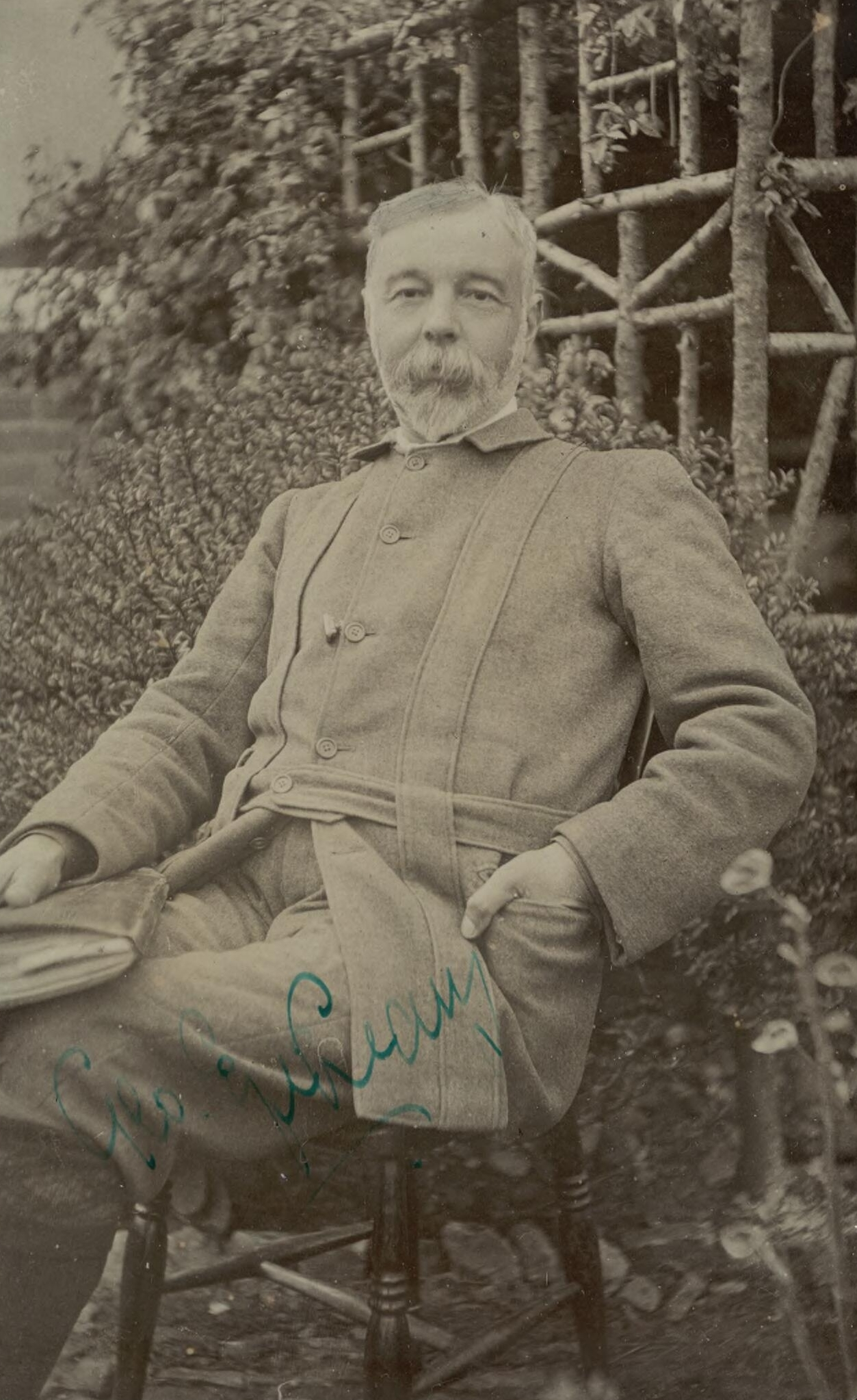
- Portrait of George Eyre Evans from c. 1908
- Born: 8 September 1857; Colyton
- Died: 9 November 1939 (aged 82); Carmarthen
- Occupation: Cleric, antiquarian
- Employer: Royal Commission on the Ancient and Historical Monuments of Wales
- Parent(s): David Lewis Evans
- Relatives: Catherine Powell Evans

Reverend George Eyre Evans (8 September 1857 – 9 November 1939) was an antiquarian and Unitarian minister from Wales.

== Early life ==
Evans was born in 1857 in Colyton, Devon, the son of Rev. David Lewis Evans (1813–1902) and Ophelia Catherine Powell (1823–1866). He moved to Carmarthen in 1864. His mother died when he was young, and he and his other siblings were raised by his aunt, Laura Hirtzel Powell.

Evan received his schooling at Queen Elizabeth's Grammar School, William Thomas' school in Llandysul and Liverpool University.

== Career ==
=== Antiquarian ===
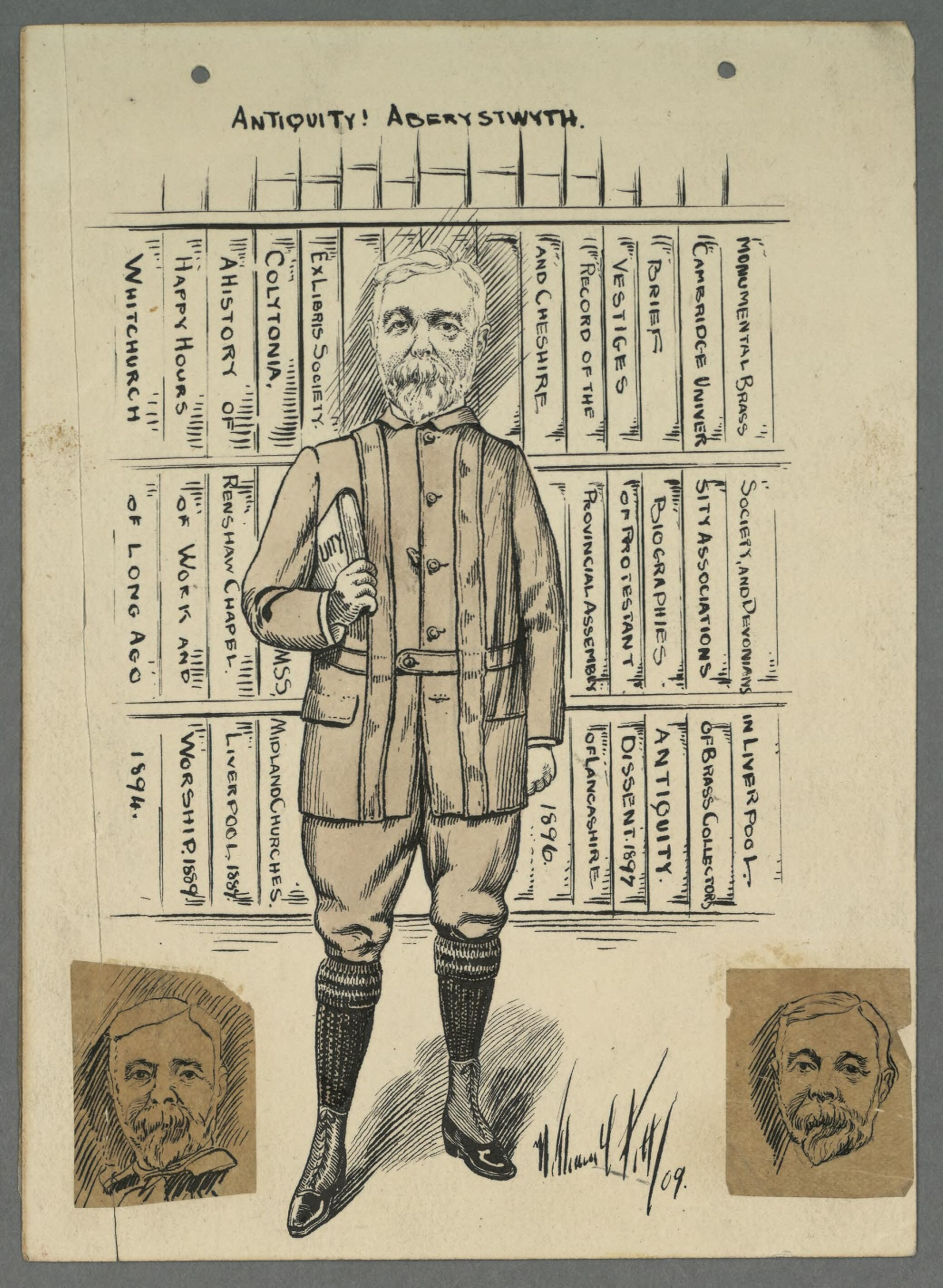
Portrait of George Eyre Evans in 1905

Evans researched for the Royal Commission on Ancient Monuments in Wales and Monmouthshire for 18 years. He was a founding member of the Carmarthenshire Antiquarian Society, in 1906, acting as secretary for 33 years until his death. From 1903, he was a member of the Cambrian Archaeological Society. He was a member of the Council of the Unitarian Historical Society.

In 1910, he was appointed the Inspecting Officer of the Royal Commission on Ancient Monuments.

He published a number of history books, including Vestiges of Protestant Dissent (1897), and also left many unpublished manuscripts.

He became a governor of UCW Aberystwyth in 1919 and was elected to the council of the National Museum of Wales in 1921 and the council of the National Library of Wales in 1924.

=== Minister ===
Evans was the minister at Whitchurch between 1889 and 1897 and then at the Unitarian Chapel, Aberystwyth between 1898 and 1928.

== Personal life ==
He joined the Boy Scouts and became County Scout Commissioner for Carmarthenshire. In 1928, he became Deputy Scout Commissioner for Wales.

In 1937, he was made a Freeman of the Borough of Carmarthen.

== Death ==
Evans died in Carmarthen on 9 November 1939 at the age of 82. His ashes were scattered at Allt-y-blaca graveyard.

== Legacy ==
George Eyre Evans' papers were donated to the National Library of Wales.

The Carmarthenshire Antiquarian Society mounted a blue plaque in honour of George Eyre Evans on the building at 5 Quay Street in Carmarthen where he founded and worked in a museum.

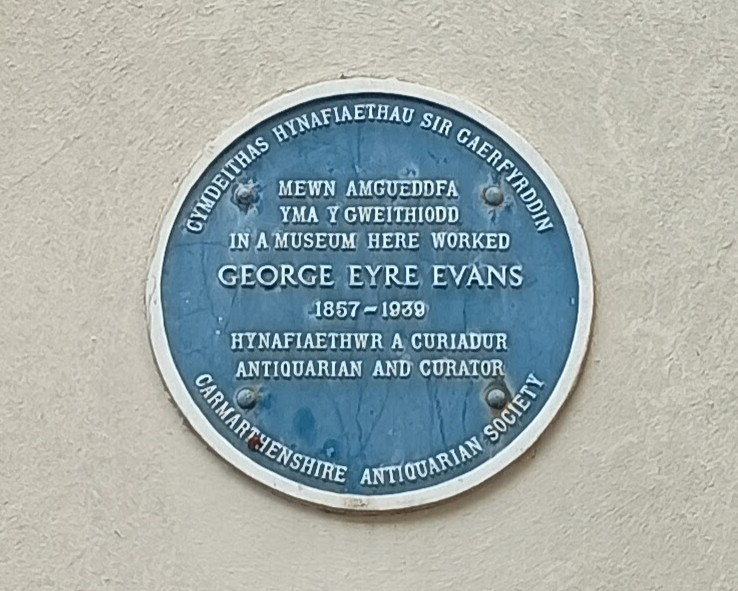
Blue plaque for George Eyre Evans on Quay Street, Carmarthen
