= Beatrix Cenci =

Opera in two acts

- Opera by Alberto Ginastera
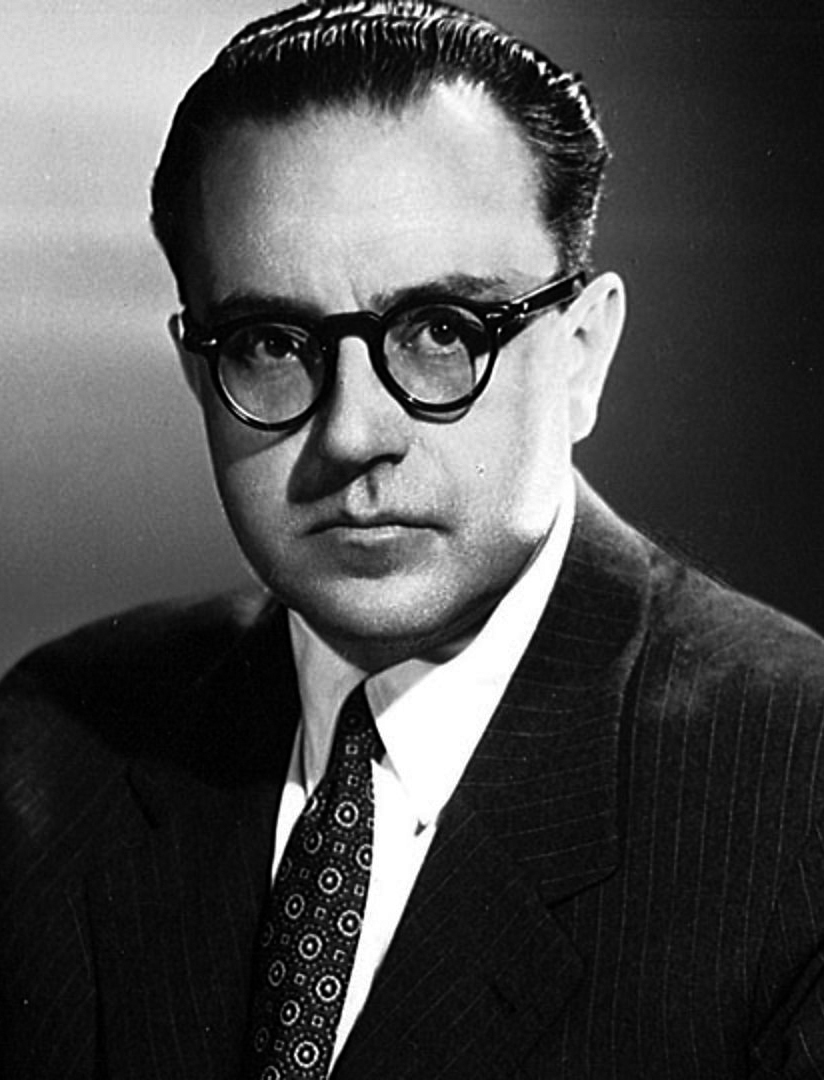
- The composer
- Librettist: Ginastera; William Shand
- Language: Spanish
- Based on: Beatrice Cenci, Stendhal's Chroniques italiennes, Percy Shelley's The Cenci
- Premiere: 10 September 1971; John F. Kennedy Center for the Performing Arts opening

Beatrix Cenci is an opera in two acts by Alberto Ginastera to a Spanish libretto by the composer and William Shand, based on the historical family of Beatrice Cenci, the Chroniques italiennes by Stendhal, and The Cenci by Percy Shelley. The first performance was on 10 September 1971 by the Opera Society of Washington in Washington, D.C., as part of the opening of the John F. Kennedy Center for the Performing Arts. The stage direction was by Gerald Freedman, with choreography by Joyce Trisler, and the conductor was Julius Rudel. New York City Opera first staged the work on 1 April 1973. The European premiere of Beatrix Cenci took place at the Geneva Opera in September 2000.

== Roles ==
- Beatrix Cenci (soprano)
- Count Francesco Cenci, father to Beatrix (baritone)
- Lucrecia Cenci, stepmother to Beatrix (mezzo-soprano)
- Bernardo Cenci, brother to Beatrix (soprano, 'pants' role)
- Giacomo Cenci, brother to Beatrix (baritone)
- Orsino, a prelate (tenor)
- Andrea, servant to the Count (bass)
- Olimpio, an assassin (speaking role)
- Marzio, an assassin (speaking role)
- A guard (bass)
- First guest (tenor)
- Second guest (tenor)
- Third guest (bass)

== Synopsis ==
The opera is in two acts and 14 scenes. The setting is the Cenci Palace, Rome, in the late 16th century.

Count Francesco Cenci has arranged for a masked ball to celebrate the death of his two sons at Salamanca. The people despise the Count, and his daughter Beatrix and his second wife Lucrecia live in fear of him. Beatrix wants to escape by having her former suitor, Orsino, communicate a letter to the Pope. Orsino, who has taken Holy Orders, destroys the letter.

At the ball, the guests are repelled at the idea of the Count celebrating the deaths of his own sons. They leave, to the terror of Beatrix, who does not want to be alone in her father's company. Orsino enters and covers his destruction of Beatrix's letter by saying that the Pope has rejected her plea. Left alone, the Count rapes Beatrix.

When in exile after reporting her father's act, Beatrix's older brother Giacomo convinces Beatrix to kill her father. She then hires two assassins for the task, Olimpio and Marzio. Lucrecia gives Cenci a sleeping potion. The assassins kill the Count and conceal his body.

Months later, Orsino announces that the Count's body has been discovered. One of the assassins has been killed, and the other has confessed to the murder. Beatrix is arrested for the crime, and then bound and tortured. Finally, she is executed at the scaffold.
