= The Cenci (opera) =

The Cenci is a 1951 opera in eight scenes by Havergal Brian based on the Shelley play The Cenci. The opera premiered in 1997 in the UK in a performance in London by the Millennium Sinfonia conducted by James Kelleher.

== Recording ==
Soloists including Helen Field, soprano David Wilson-Johnson, baritone Inga Jonsdottir, contralto Stuart Kale, tenor Justin Lavender, tenor Millennium Sinfonia James Kelleher First recording TOCC0094
