= Ginevra Cantofoli =

Italian artist (1618–1672)

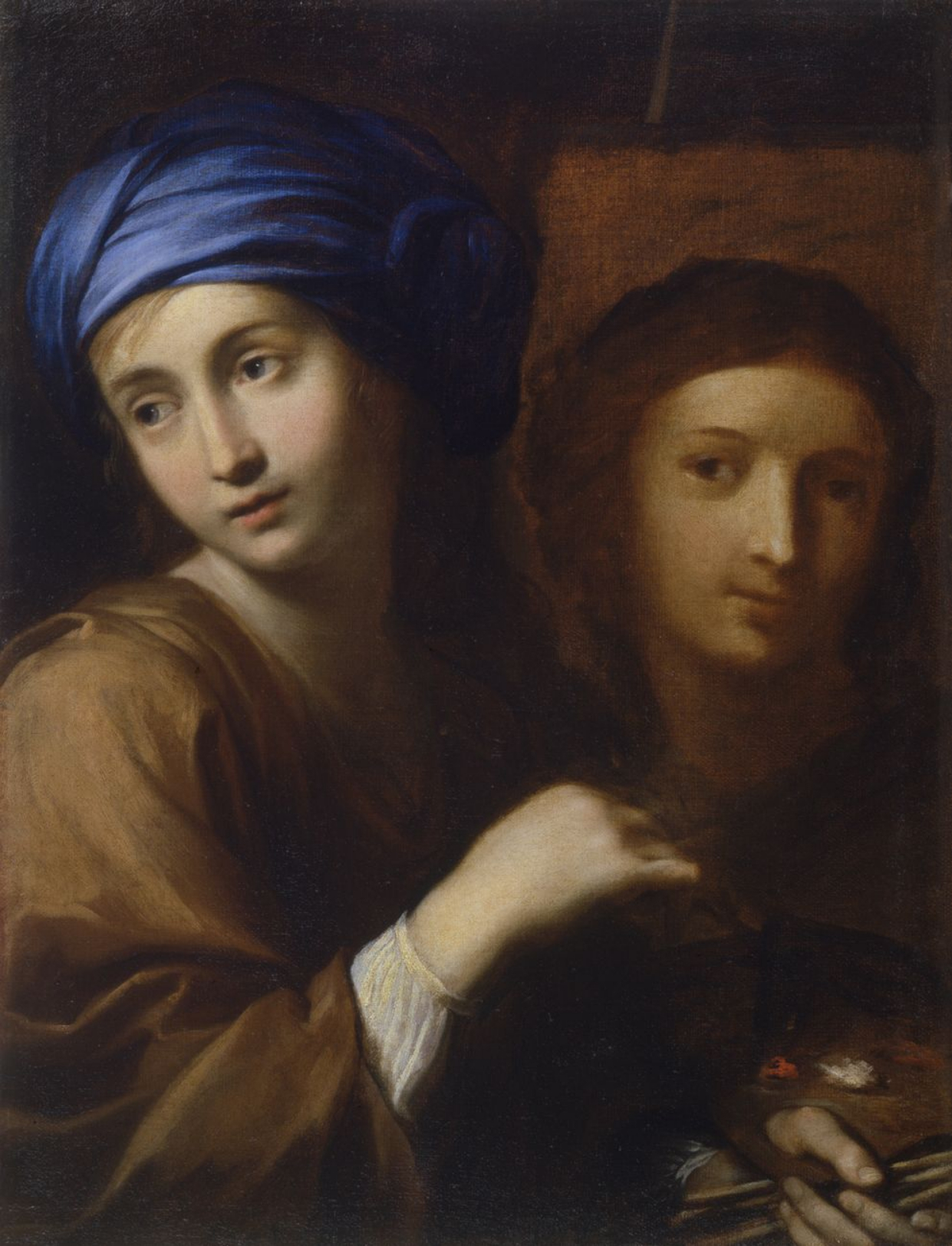
- Self-Portrait (Allegory of painting)
- Born: 1608 or 1618; Bologna, Papal States
- Died: 1672 (aged 53–64); Bologna, Papal States
- Education: Giovanni Andrea Sirani
- Known for: Painting
- Movement: Baroque

Ginevra Cantofoli (Italian pronunciation: [dʒiˈneːvra kanˈtɔːfoli]; 1608 or 1618 – 1672) was an Italian painter. She was active in Bologna during the Baroque period.

== Career ==
Born in Bologna, Papal States, Cantofoli trained there under Giovanni Andrea Sirani, the father of Elisabetta Sirani. Although a generation older than Elisabetta Sirani, Cantofoli was described by Carlo Cesare Malvasia, Cesare Masini, and Marcello Oretti as Elisabetta's student. Also named as her teachers are Emilio Taruffi, Lorenzo Pasinelli, and Giovanni Gioseffo dal Sole.

According to art historian Laura M. Ragg, among the women painters in Bologna at the time, Cantofoli "had much more talent than any of her companions."

Her early works were pastel portraits and small paintings, but she later went on to paint large-scale compositions. She was primarily a history painter. She also produced several altarpieces for Bolognese churches, although none of these works are known to still exist.

Art historian Massimo Pulini attributes 30 works to Cantofoli. Among her works are a painting, Self-Portrait, Allegory of Painting, and a drawing, Self-Portrait, which portrays the artist holding a palette and brushes before an easel, both dated to c. 1665. It has also been asserted that a painting known as Allegory of Painting (in a private collection) contains a self-portrait, and that "the features of many of her female figures resemble her own."

A painting of a woman in a turban in the collection of the Palazzo Barberini, traditionally identified as a portrait of Beatrice Cenci, long attributed to Guido Reni, has been attributed to Ginevra Cantofoli.

== Gallery ==
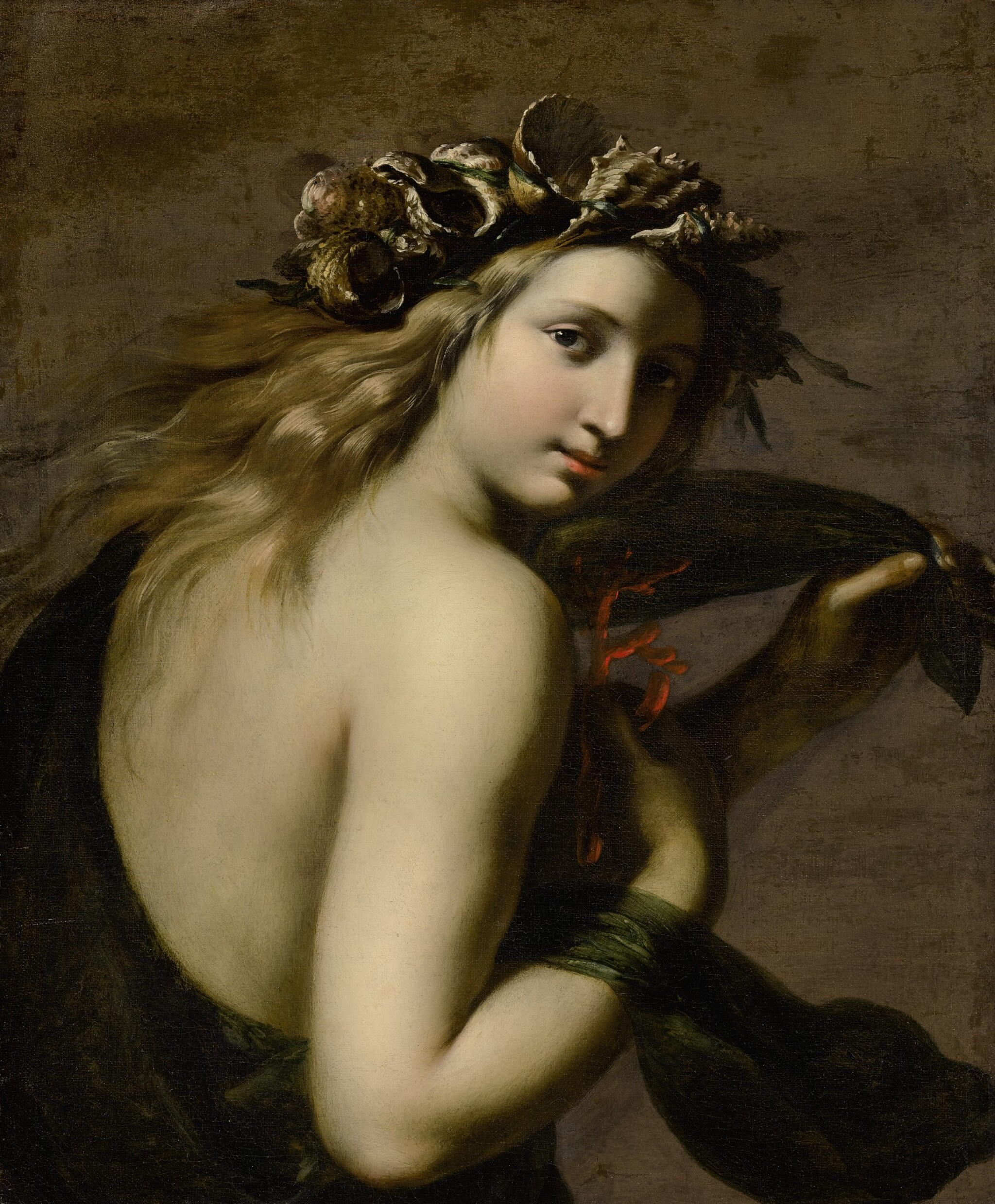
A Sea Nymph, probably Galatea, private collection

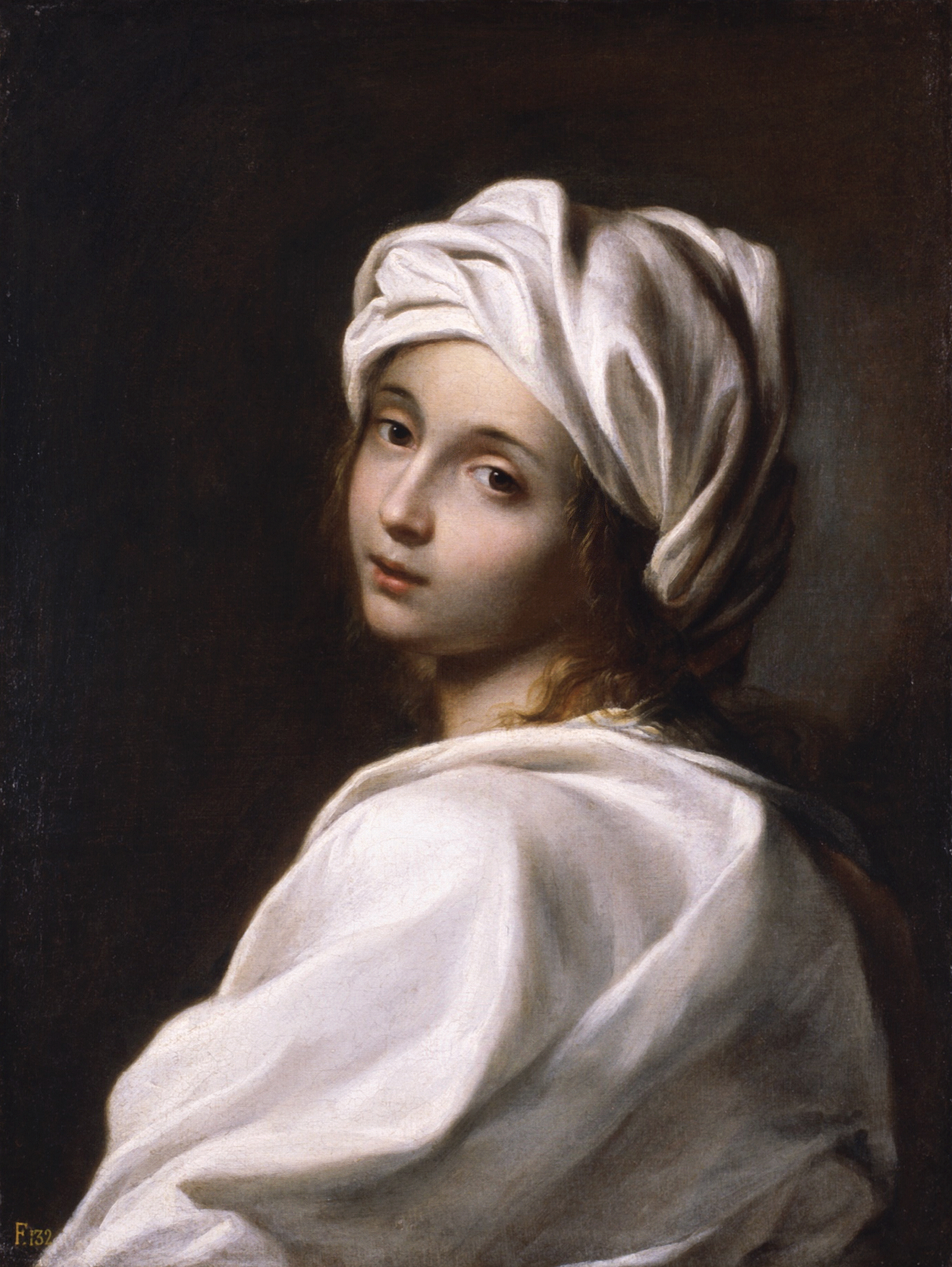
Presumed portrait of Beatrice Cenci, Palazzo Barberini

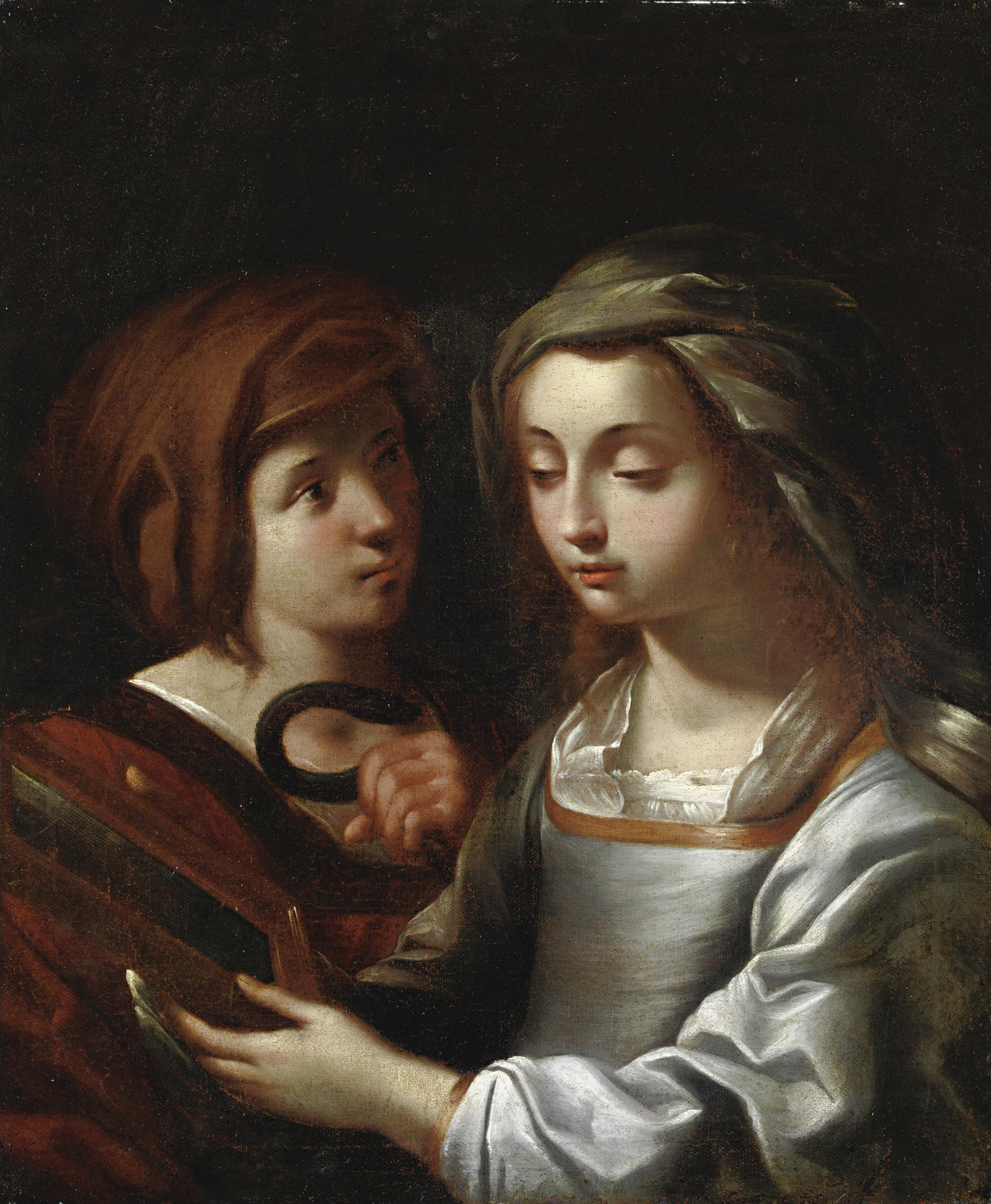
Scena Allegorica, private collection

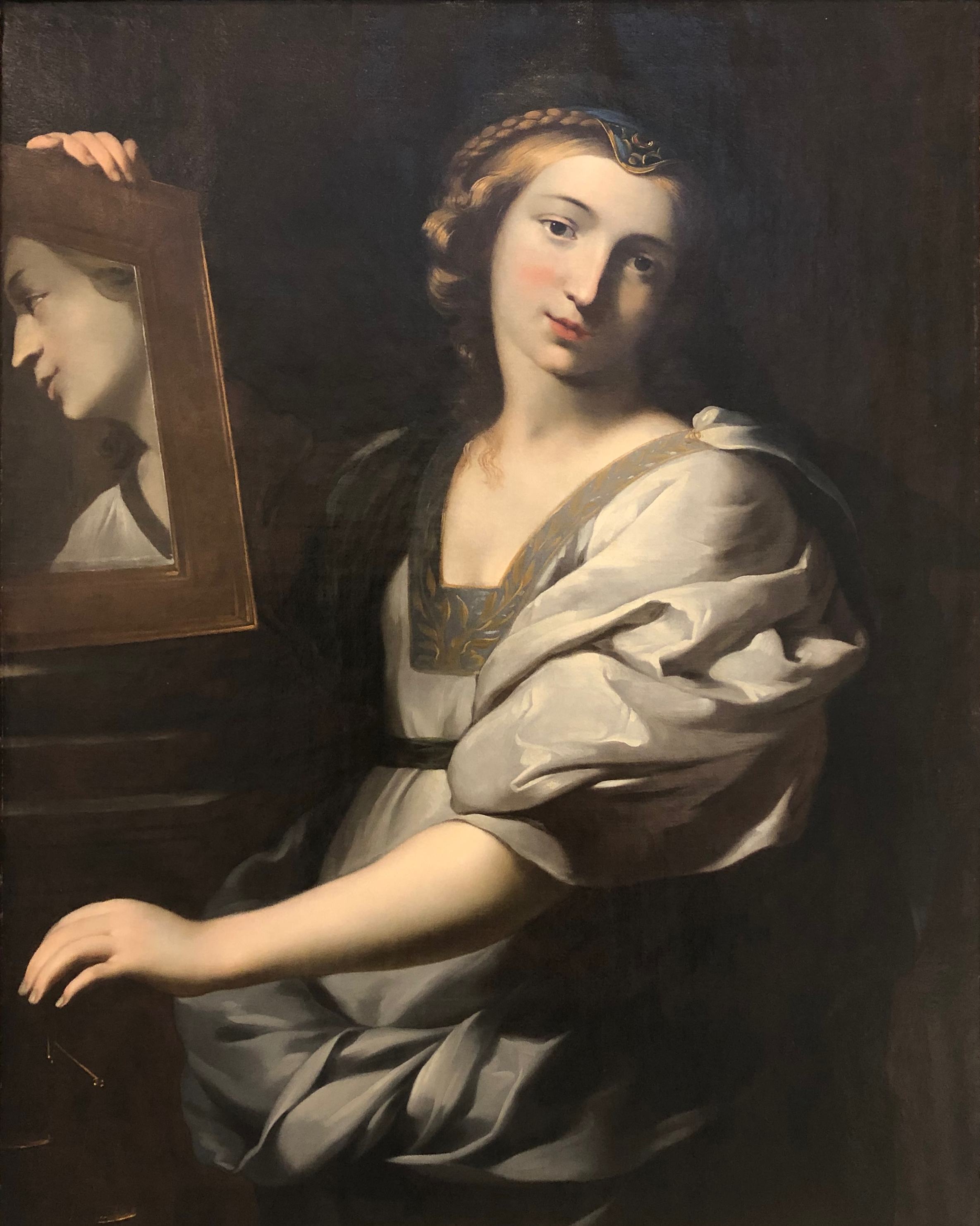
Truth Revealing the Artifice of Painting, c. 1665-1672, Berkeley Art Museum
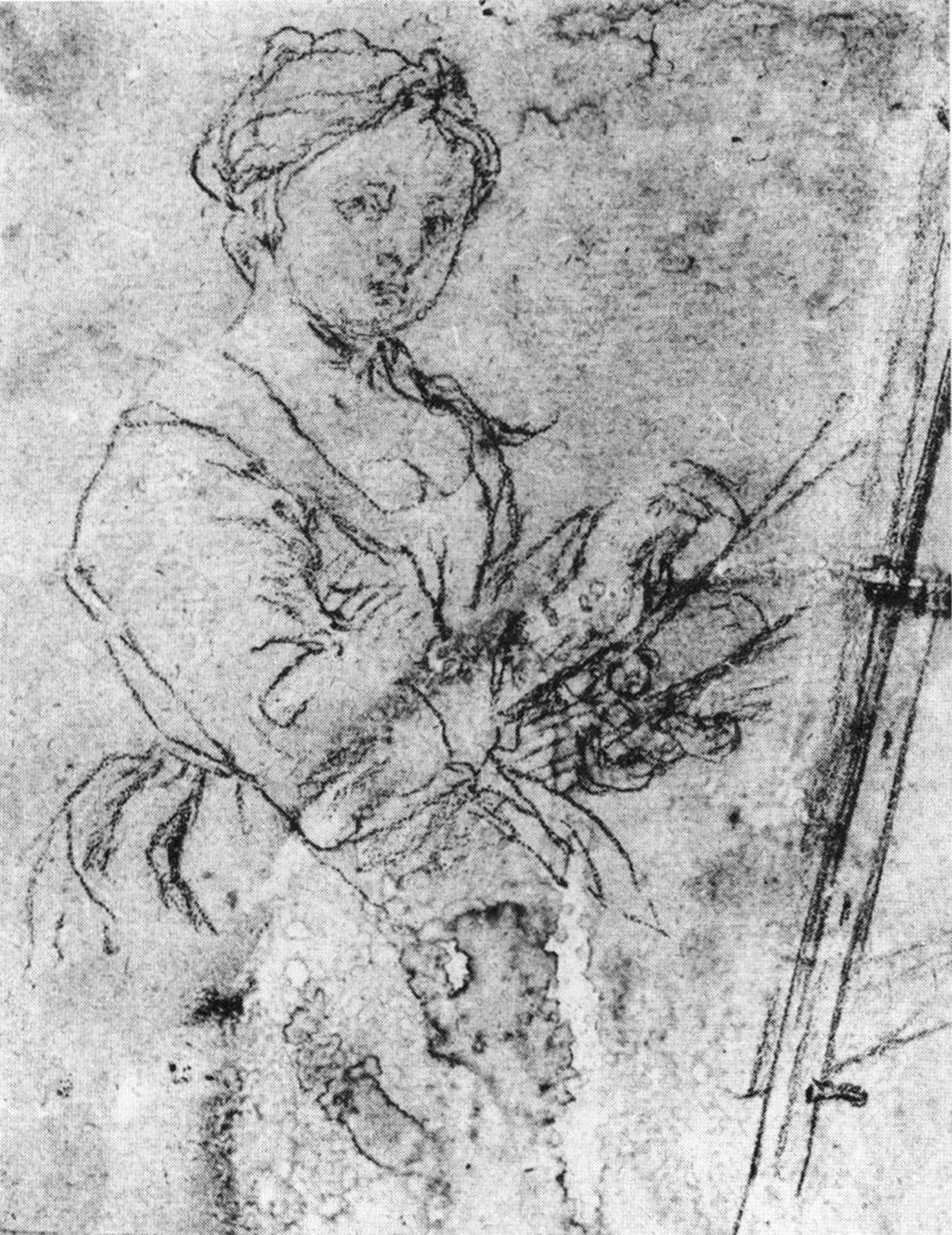
Self-Portrait (drawing), c. 1665, Giorgio Cini Foundation, Venice

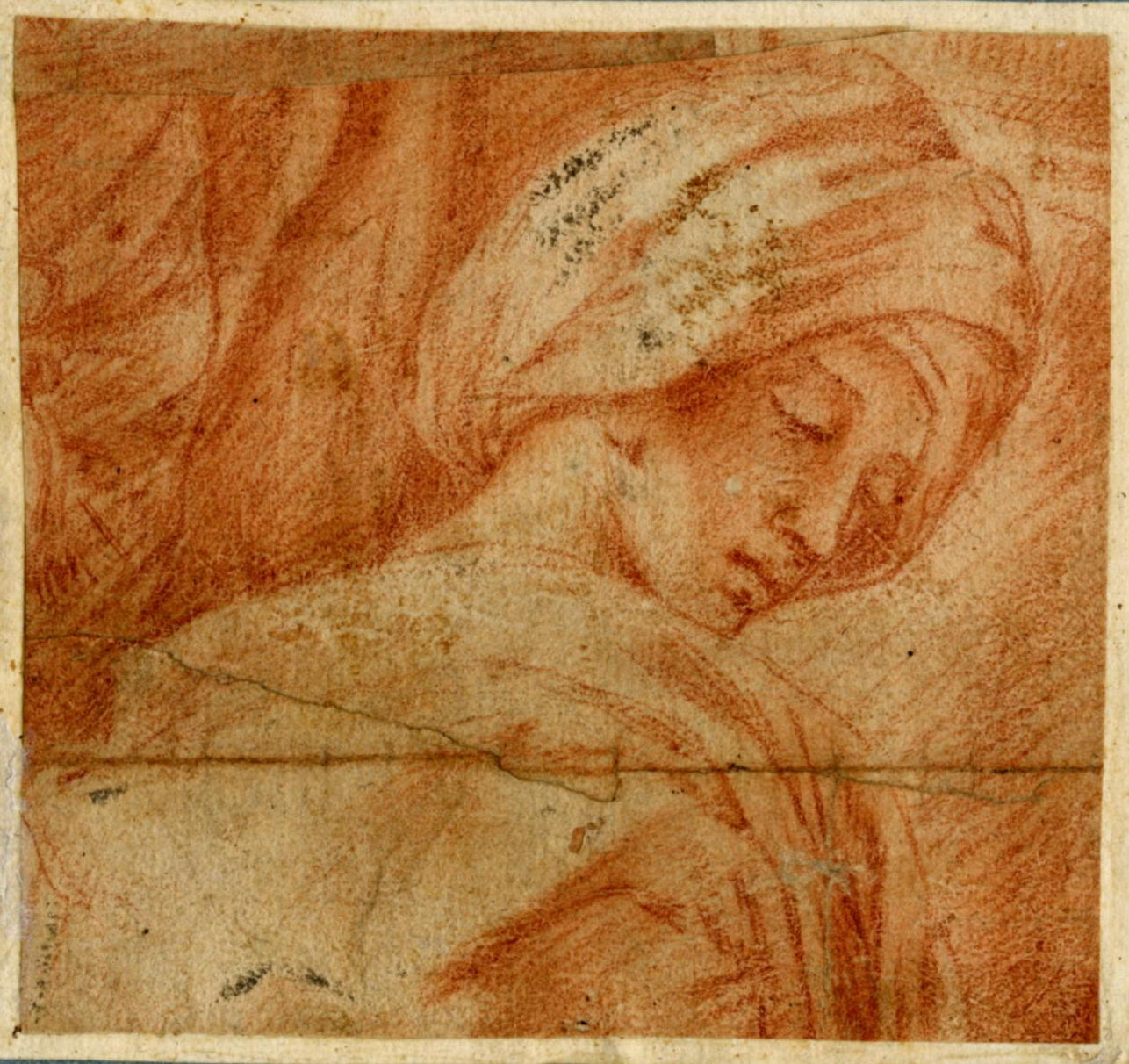
Head of a woman wearing a turban, after Guido Reni, attributed to Cantofoli, The British Museum

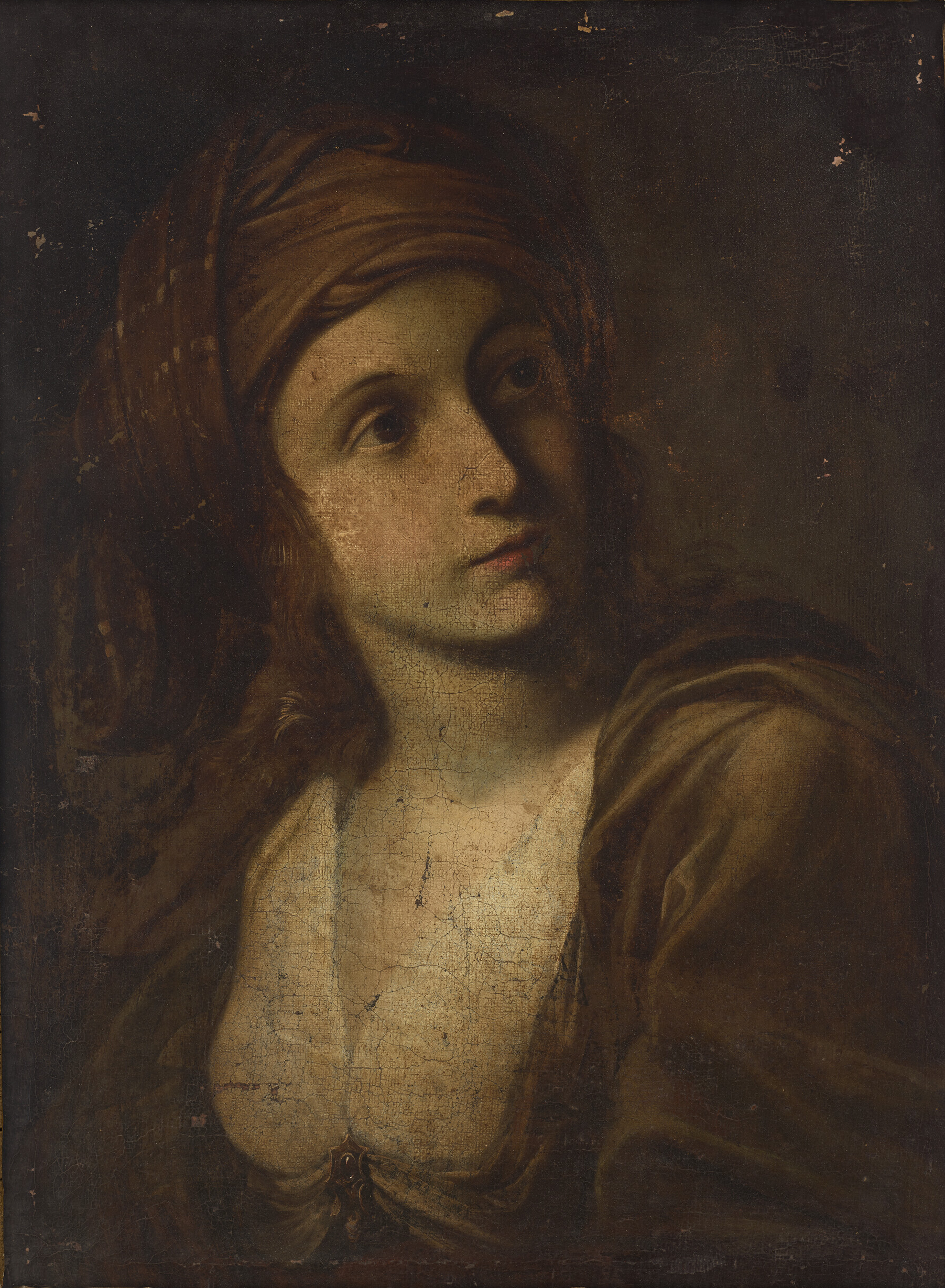
A Sybil, private collection

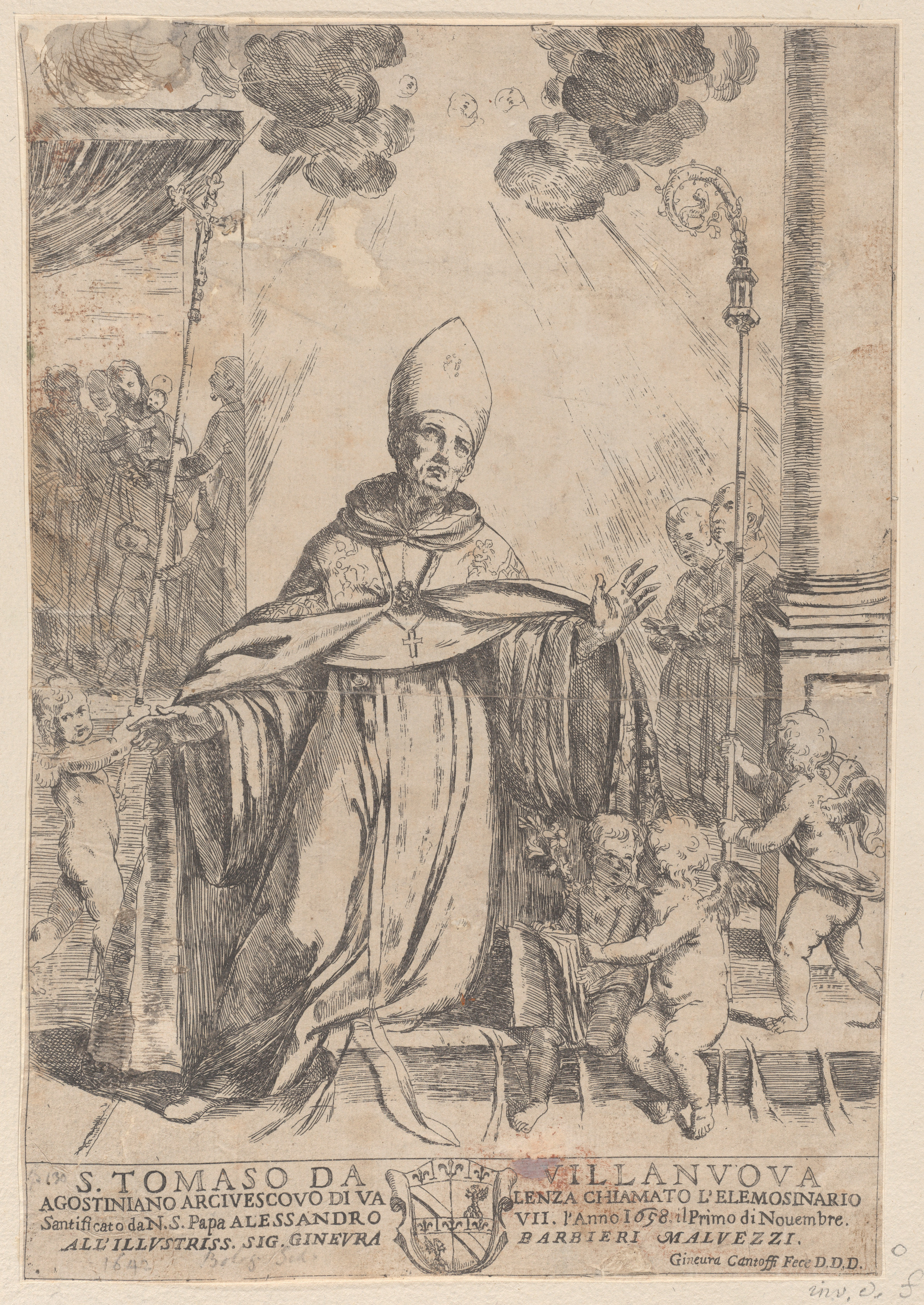
Saint Thomas of Villanova, etching of 1658 after the painting by Cantofoli

== Sources ==
- Bohn, Babette. "Female Self-Portraiture in Early Modern Bologna", Renaissance Studies, Vol. 18, No. 2 (June 2004), pp. 239–286
- Bryan, Michael. "Cantofoli, Ginevra" in Bryan's Dictionary of Painters and Engravers, Biographical and Critical, London: George Bell and Sons, 1899, Vol. I: (A-K), p. 227.
- Pulini, Massimo (2006). Ginevra Cantofoli: la nuova nascita di una pittrice nella Bologna del Seicento, Bologna 2006.
- Ragg, Laura M. The Women Artists of Bologna, London: Methuen & Co., 1907.
