= Joaquín Giannuzzi =

Argentine writer

Joaquín O. Giannuzzi (29 July 1924 – 26 January 2004) was an Argentine writer from Buenos Aires who focused on poetry and journalism.

His writings were translated to multiple languages.

== Publications ==
- Our Mortal Days (1958)
- Contemporaries of the World (1962)
- The Conditions of the Era (1967)
- Signs of a Personal Cause (1977)
- Principles of Uncertainty (1980)
- Obligatory Violin (1984)
- Final Head (1991)
- Is Anyone There? 2004
