= William Shand =

Scottish-born Argentine poet, novelist and playwright

- Born: 1902; Glasgow, Scotland
- Died: 1997 (aged 94–95); Buenos Aires, Argentina
- Occupation: Writer

William Shand (1902–1997) was a Scottish-born Argentine poet, novelist and playwright. Arriving in Argentina in 1938, he worked for La Nación as a book reviewer, translator and critic. Shand translated the poetry of John Donne and Stephen Spender and was a playwright of multiple works, including the libretto for the opera Beatrix Cenci of Alberto Ginastera. Collaborating with Alberto Girri, they compiled other poets' works into collected editions. Characterized as "a careful observer of contemporary Argentine society" Shand "... often dealt with highly controversial and delicate topics". He split his time between an apartment opposite Plazoleta Carlos Pellegrini and a villa in San Miguel.

== Selected works ==
- Teatro (1967)
- Judith y el gangster (1967)
- Selected poems (1978)
- Una extraña jornada (1978)
- Las andanzas de Rubino (1983)

== Recognition ==
- 1984, Merit Diploma of Translation, Konex Foundation
- 1994, Merit Diploma of Translation, Konex Foundation
- Premio Fondo Nacional del Arte
- Premo Municipal
- Faja de HOnor de la S.A.D.E
