= Alltyblacca =

Village in Ceredigion, Wales

Coordinates: 52.08°N 04.16°W

Alltyblaca
- Location within Ceredigion
- OS grid reference: SN5245
- Principal area: Ceredigion
- Country: Wales
- Sovereign state: United Kingdom
- Police: Dyfed-Powys
- Fire: Mid and West Wales
- Ambulance: Welsh
- UK Parliament: Ceredigion Preseli

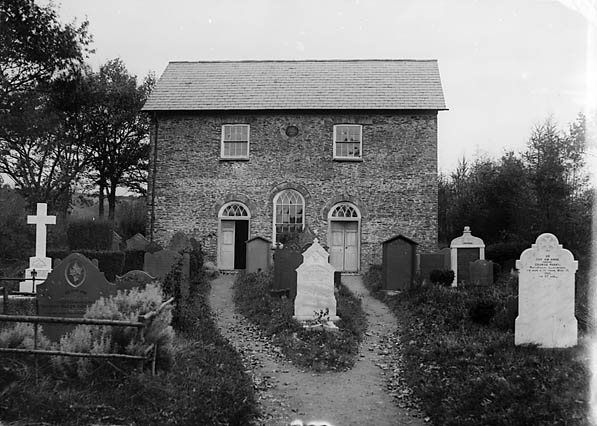
Alltyblaca Unitarian chapel c.1885

Alltyblaca is a village in the Welsh county of Ceredigion, Mid-West Wales, located on the road between Llanybydder and Llanwnnen.

== The chapel ==
There has been a chapel in the village since 1740. This was the sister chapel to the building at Llwynrhydowen and at different times adopted the stances of the Arminian, Arian and later the Unitarian theologies. In the nineteenth century, this part of West Wales became known as the Smotyn du (Black spot) because of the predominance of Unitarianism in the area, and Alltyblacca was an important regional centre. The present building was erected in 1837 and restored in 1892. It is built in the same style as the Unitarian chapels at Rhydygwin, near Felinfach, and Cribyn. The building has a central arched window, with a pair of arched doors at either side and square windows opening above. Inside, there is a panelled gallery on three sides supported by iron columns manufactured at the Priory Foundry at Carmarthen. The chapel stands in a cemetery, and the dwelling house by the gate used at one time to house a schoolroom on its upper floor.
