= Frangipani (disambiguation) =

Plumeria is a genus of flowering plants whose common name is Frangipani.

Frangipani or Frangipane may also refer to:

- Frangipane, an almond-flavoured pastry filling
- Frangipani, a 2004 novel by Tahitian writer Célestine Hitiura Vaite
- Frangipani, a 2013 Sri Lankan film directed by Visakesa Chandrasekaram

== People ==
- Frangipani family, an Italian family that came to prominence in the Middle Ages
  - Cencio I Frangipane (1066?–1102?), Roman nobleman and consul
  - Cencio II Frangipane (early twelfth century), Catholic cardinal
  - Saint Ottone Frangipane (1040–1127), Italian monk and hermit
  - Oddone Frangipane (mid-twelfth century), military leader
  - William Frangipani (died 1337), Latin Archbishop of Patras
- Alexander Mirto Frangipani (16th century), Roman Catholic prelate who served as Bishop of Caiazzo (1529–1537)
- Ashley Frangipane (born 1994), American singer-songwriter known professionally as Halsey
- Fabio Mirto Frangipani (died 1587), Roman Catholic prelate who served as Titular Archbishop of Nazareth
- Gabriele Frangipani (born 2001), Italian figure skater
- Giovanni Frangipane (1902–1967), Italian sprinter and football player
- Jean Frangipani (16th century), Croat noble who acted as ambassador of France to the Ottoman court
- Niccolò Frangipane (active 1565–1597), Italian painter of the late Renaissance period
- Ottavio Mirto Frangipani (1544–1612), Italian bishop and papal diplomat
- Paolo Frangipane (born 1979), Argentine footballer

== See also ==
- Fragipan, a type of layer in soil
- Fragapane, a surname
- Frankopan family (Italian: Frangipani), a Croatian noble family
