= Cencio Frangipane =

Cencio Frangipane may refer to:

- Cencio I Frangipane
- Cencio II Frangipane

== See also ==
- Cencio
