= Censi =

Censi may refer to:

- Censi (surname), including a list of people with the name
- Les Censi, a 1935 film by Antonin Artaud
- Censi, a nonstandard plural form of census

== See also ==
- Capite censi, the "head count" of ancient Rome
- Cenci (disambiguation)
- The Cenci, by Percy Bysshe Shelley, sometimes written Censi
