= DiCenzo =

DiCenzo (pronounced [diˈtʃɛntso]) or DeCenzo (pronounced [deˈtʃɛntso]), more accurately spelled Di Cenzo / De Cenzo, is an Italian surname derived from Cenzo, an apheretic form of the given name Vincenzo. Notable people with the surname include:

- Dan DiCenzo (born c. 1979), American college football coach
- David A. DeCenzo (born 1955), American academic
- George DiCenzo (1940–2010), American actor and producer
- Gianni DeCenzo (born 2001), American actor
- Greg DiCenzo (born 1975), American baseball coach and former football, soccer, and baseball player
- Ryan Decenzo (born 1986), Canadian skateboarder
- Derek DiCenzo (born 1960's), American jazz musician

== See also ==
- Censi (surname)
- Cenzo
- Cenci
- Cencio
