= Cenci =

Cenci (pronounced [ˈtʃɛntʃi]) is an Italian surname derived from the medieval given name Cencio. Notable people with the name include:

- House of Cenci, a noble family of Renaissance Rome, including:
  - Beatrice Cenci (1577–1599), Italian noblewoman and parricide
  - Serafino Cenci (1676–1740), Italian cardinal
- Athina Cenci (born 1946), Greek-Italian actress and comedian
- Antinisca Cenci (born 1978), Italian equestrian
- Baldassare Cenci (seniore) (1648–1709), Italian Roman Catholic cardinal
- Baldassare Cenci (iuniore) (1710–1763), Italian Roman Catholic cardinal
- Cecilia Cenci (1942–2014), Argentinian actress
- Christian Cenci (born 1998), Italian football player
- Gaspare Cenci (fl. 1570–1594), Italian Roman Catholic prelate
- Giuliano Cenci (1931–2018), Italian animated film director
- John Cenci (born 1934), American football player
- Massimo Cenci (born 1967), Sammarinese politician
- Matías Cenci (born 1978), Argentine football player
- Mirco Cenci (born 1957), Italian sports shooter

== See also ==
- The Cenci, a drama by Percy Shelley based on Beatrice's murder of her father
  - The Cenci (opera), an opera adaptation by Havergal Brian
  - Les Cenci, a drama adaptation by Antonin Artaud
- Beatrice Cenci (disambiguation)
- Beatrix Cenci, Alberto Ginastera's opera
- Lungotevere De' Cenci, Rome
- Cenci Journalism Project (参差计划), which aims to use multilingual and global sources in Chinese journalism
- Censi (surname)
