= Pope Gelasius II =

Head of the Catholic Church from 1118 to 1119

- Bishop of Rome
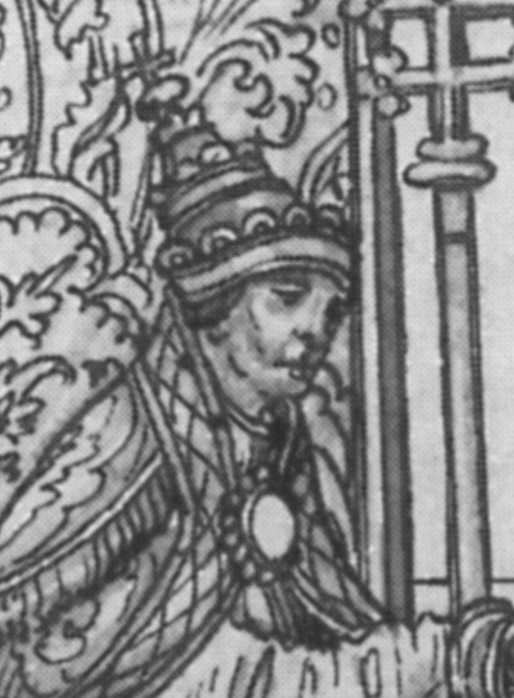
- Posthumous drawing of Gelasius II, 16th century
- Church: Catholic Church
- Papacy began: 24 January 1118
- Papacy ended: 29 January 1119
- Predecessor: Paschal II
- Successor: Callixtus II
- Previous posts: Acting Chancellor of the Holy Roman Church (1088); Cardinal-Deacon of Santa Maria in Cosmedin (1088–1118); Chancellor of the Holy Roman Church (1089–1118)

Orders
- Ordination: 9 March 1118
- Consecration: 10 March 1118
- Created cardinal: September 1088 by Urban II
- Rank: Cardinal Deacon (1088 - 1118)

Personal details
- Born: Giovanni Caetani; 1060–64 Gaeta, Duchy of Gaeta
- Died: 29 January 1119 Cluny, Duchy of Burgundy, Kingdom of France

Pope Gelasius II (c. 1060/1064 – 29 January 1119), was head of the Catholic Church and ruler of the Papal States from 24 January 1118 to his death in 1119. A monk of Monte Cassino and chancellor of Pope Paschal II, Caetani was unanimously elected to succeed him. In doing so, he also inherited the conflict with Emperor Henry V over investiture. Gelasius spent a good part of his brief papacy in exile.

== Biography ==
=== Early life ===
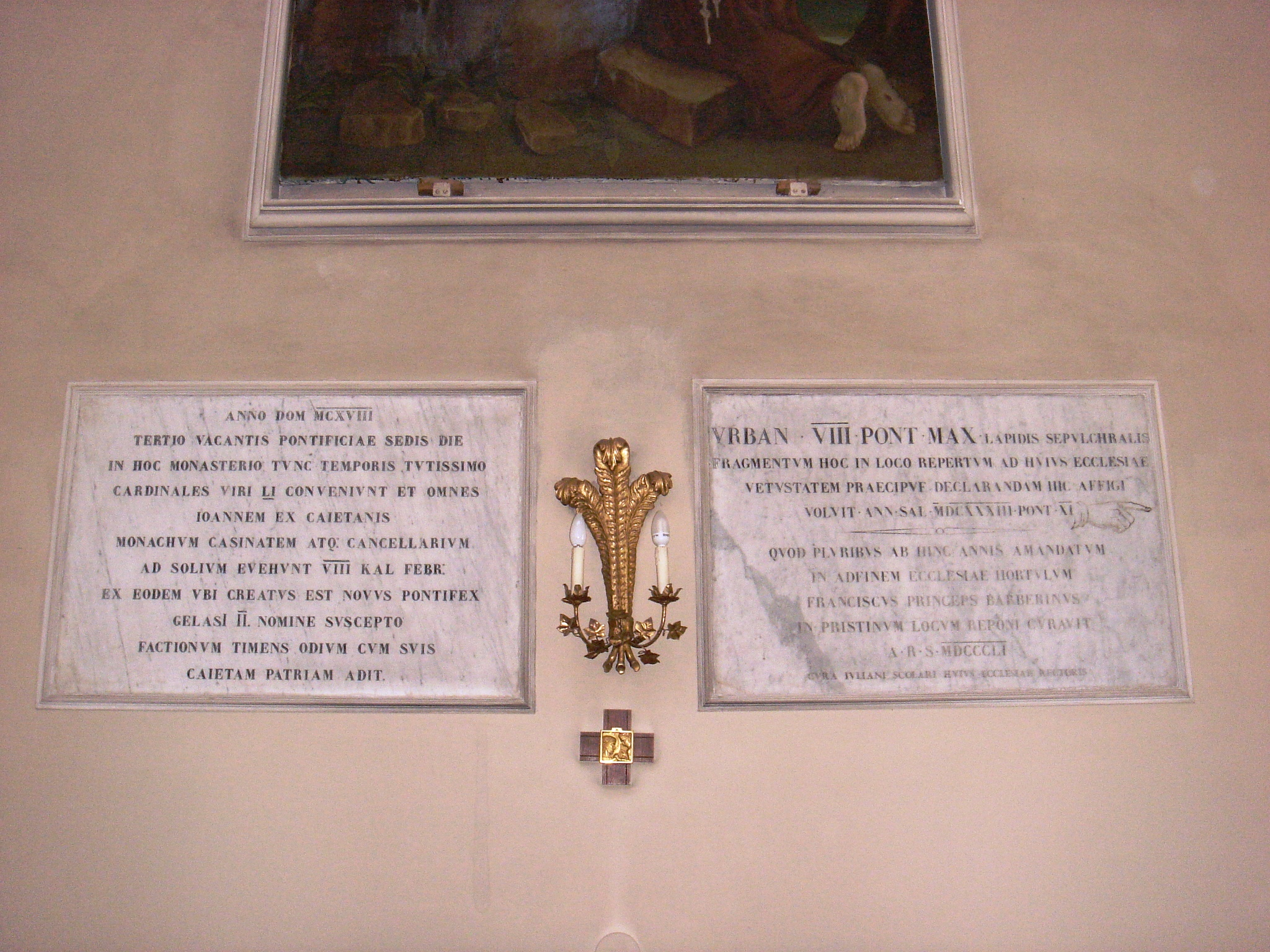
Plaque in San Sebastiano al Palatino marking the election of Caetani as Pope Gelasius II.

Born c. 1060 at Gaeta, Giovanni belonged to the Caetani family. He was educated and later became a monk at Monte Cassino. Pope Urban II, who wished to improve the style of papal documents, brought him to Rome and made Giovanni a papal subdeacon (August 1088) and cardinal deacon of Santa Maria in Cosmedin (probably on 23 September 1088). As chancellor of the Holy Roman Church from 1089 to 1118, he drastically reformed the papal administration, establishing a permanent staff of clerks for the papacy, overcoming the previous custom of relying on Roman notaries to write papal documents, and introducing the minuscule curial script. His tenure also established the precedent of the papal chancellor always being a cardinal and holding the office for life or until elected pope.

=== Pontificate ===
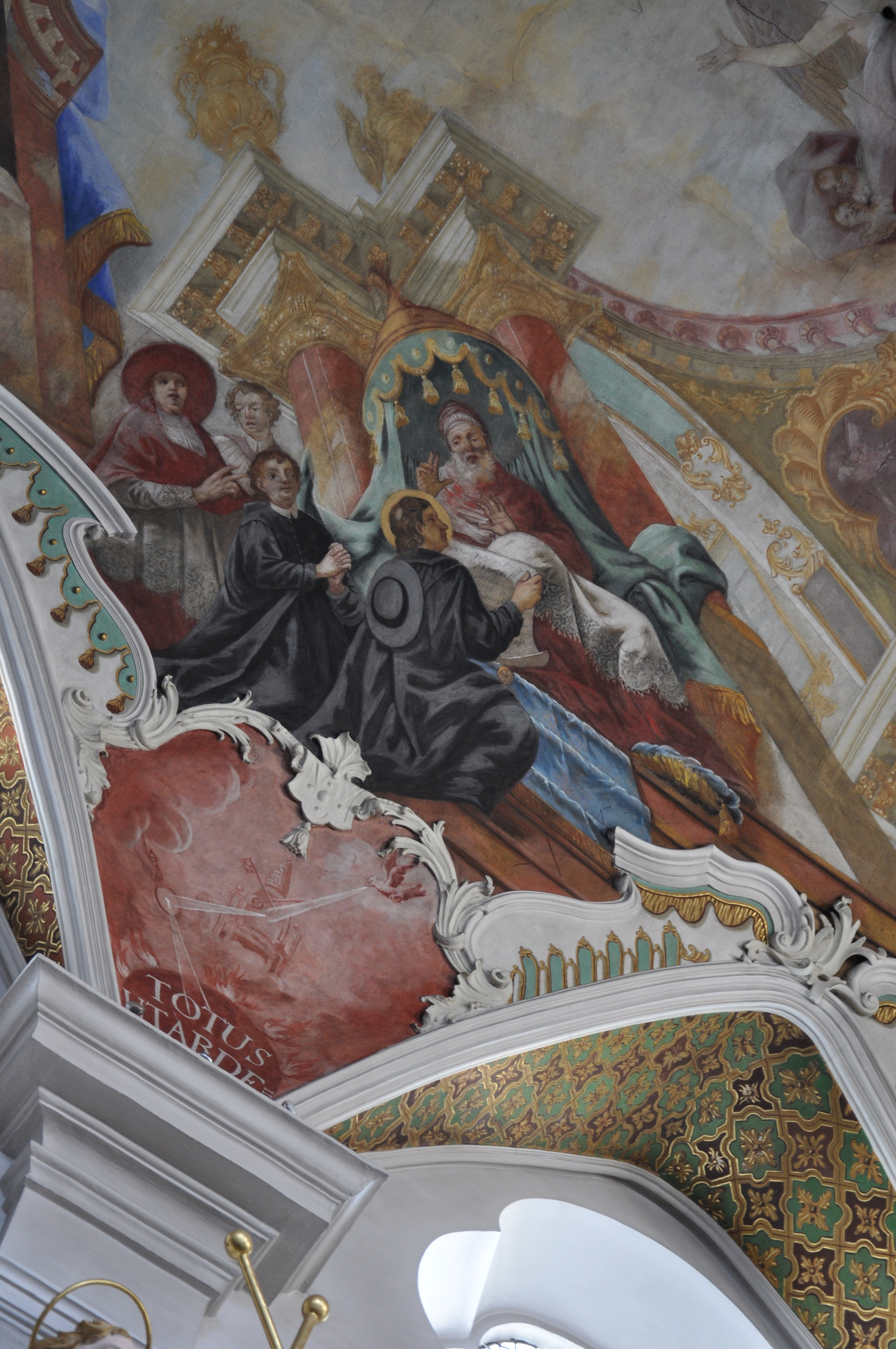
Fresco in Pfarrkirche St. Magnus (Bad Schussenried) showing Norbert of Xanten before Pope Gelasius II

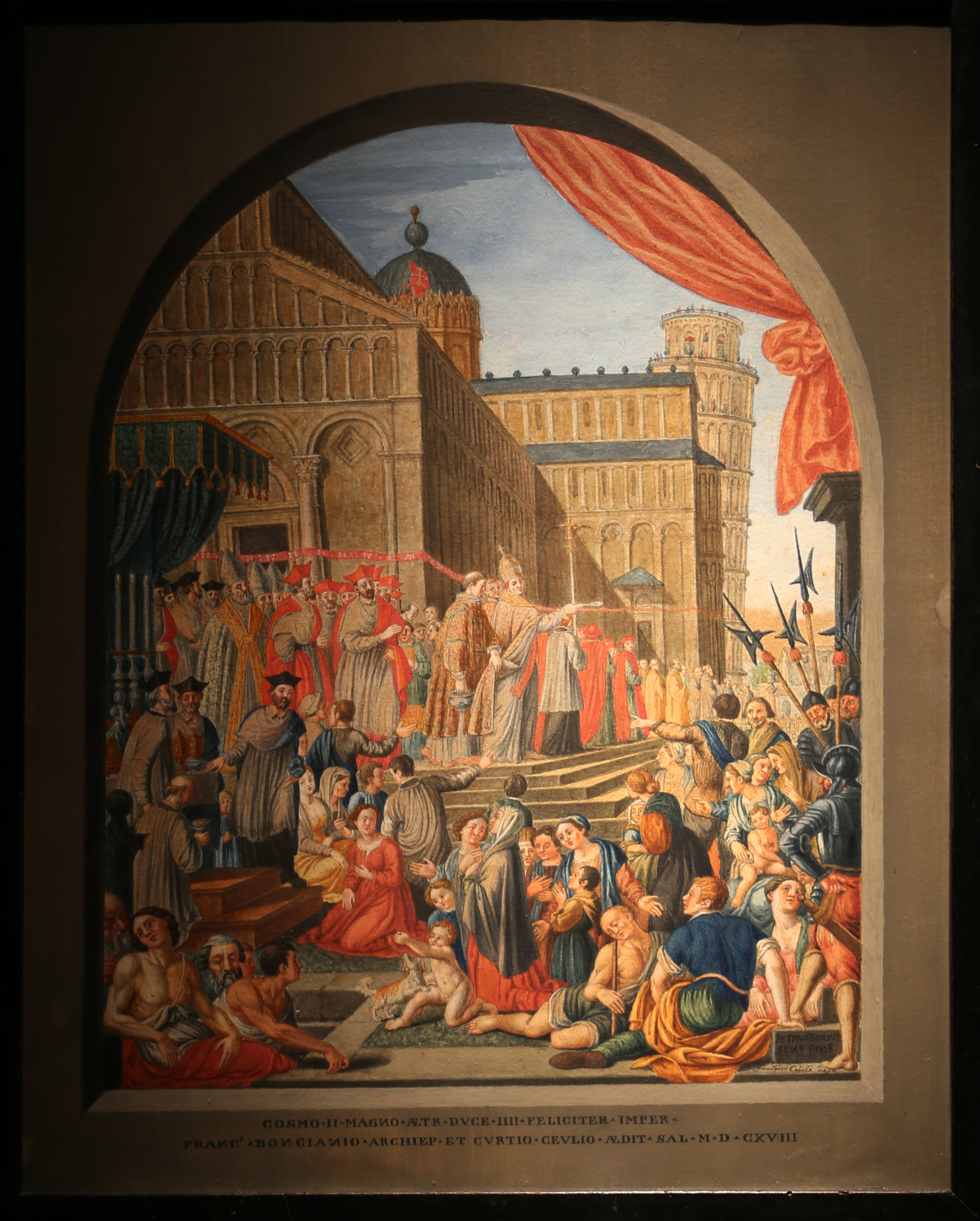
Painting of Gelasius II consecrating Pisa Cathedral

Upon his unanimous election to succeed Pope Paschal II in 1118, Giovanni took the name Gelasius II. He was immediately seized by Cencio II Frangipane, a partisan of Emperor Henry V, but was freed by a general uprising of the Romans on his behalf.

Gelasius was driven from Rome in March 1118, by Henry V who sought to enforce the privilege of investiture. His election was pronounced null and void by Henry who set up Maurice Bourdin, Archbishop of Braga, as antipope under the name of Gregory VIII. Gelasius fled to Gaeta, where he was ordained a priest on 9 March 1118 and on the following day received episcopal consecration. He at once excommunicated Henry V and the antipope and, under Norman protection, was able to return to Rome in July. But the disturbances of the imperialist party, especially those of the Frangipani, who attacked the Pope while celebrating Mass in the church of St. Prassede, compelled Gelasius to go once more into exile. He set out for France, consecrating the cathedral of Pisa on the way, and arrived at Marseille in October. He was received with great enthusiasm at Avignon, Montpellier and other cities, and held a synod at Vienne in January 1119. Gelasius died 29 January 1119 at the Abbey of Cluny, whilst planning to hold a general council to settle the investiture controversy.

== See also ==
- List of popes

== Sources ==
- Brand, Benjamin (2014). Holy Treasure and Sacred Song: Relic Cults and Their Liturgies in Medieval Tuscany. Oxford University Press. ISBN 9780199351367.
- Loughlin, James (1909). "Pope Gelasius II". The Catholic Encyclopedia. Vol. 6. Robert Appleton Company.
- McBrien, Richard P. (1997). Lives of the Popes. HarperCollins. ISBN 0-06-065304-3.
- Pham, John-Peter (2004). Heirs of the Fisherman. Oxford University Press. ISBN 9780195178340.
- Robinson, I.S. (1990). The Papacy, 1073-1198: Continuity and Innovation. Cambridge University Press. ISBN 9780521319225.

Catholic Church titles
Preceded by Paschal II	Pope; 1118–19	Succeeded by Callixtus II
