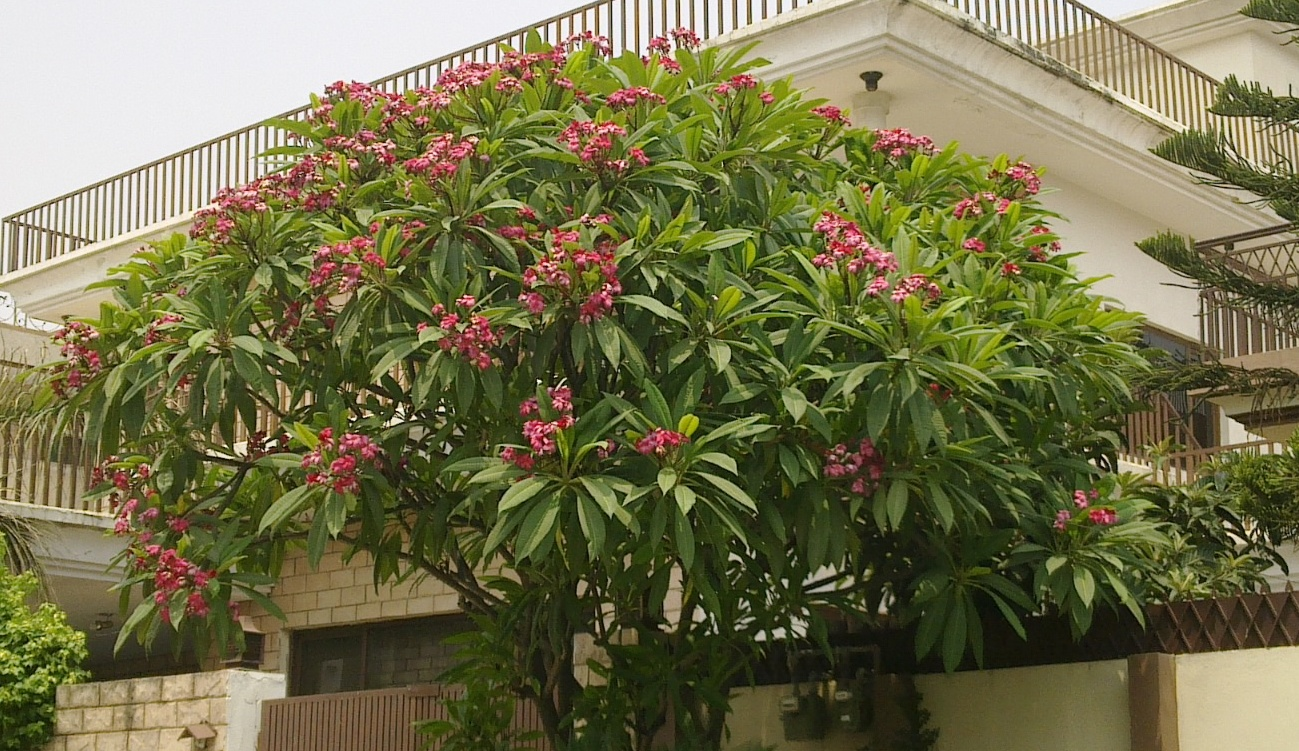
- Tree with pink flowers in Pakistan

Conservation status
- Least Concern (IUCN 3.1)

Scientific classification
- Kingdom: Plantae
- Clade: Tracheophytes
- Clade: Angiosperms
- Clade: Eudicots
- Clade: Asterids
- Order: Gentianales
- Family: Apocynaceae
- Genus: Plumeria
- Species: P. rubra

Binomial name
- Plumeria rubra L.

Synonyms
- List: Plumeria acuminata W.T.Aiton; Plumeria acutifolia Poir.; Plumeria angustifolia A.DC.; Plumeria arborea Noronha; Plumeria arborescens G.Don; Plumeria aurantia Lodd. ex G.Don; Plumeria aurantia Endl.; Plumeria aurantiaca Steud.; Plumeria bicolor Ruiz & Pav.; Plumeria carinata Ruiz & Pav.; Plumeria conspicua G.Don; Plumeria gouanii D.Don ex G.Don; Plumeria incarnata Mill.; Plumeria incarnata var. milleri (G.Don) A.DC.; Plumeria jamesonii Hook.; Plumeria kerrii G.Don; Plumeria kunthiana Kostel.; Plumeria lambertiana Lindl.; Plumeria loranthifolia Müll.Arg.; Plumeria lutea Ruiz & Pav.; Plumeria mariaelenae J.F.Gut. & J.Linares; Plumeria megaphylla A.DC.; Plumeria mexicana G.Lodd.; Plumeria milleri G.Don; Plumeria mollis Kunth; Plumeria northiana Lodd. ex G.Don; Plumeria purpurea Ruiz & Pav.; Plumeria rubra var. acuminata (W.T.Aiton) R.S.Rao & Balamani; Plumeria rubra f. acutifolia (Poir.) Woodson; Plumeria rubra f. lutea (Ruiz & Pav.) Woodson; Plumeria rubra f. tricolor (Ruiz & Pav.) Woodson; Plumeria rubra f. typica Woodson; Plumeria tenuifolia Lodd. ex G.Don; Plumeria tricolor Ruiz & Pav.

= Plumeria rubra =

Red frangipani

Species of tree

Plumeria rubra is a deciduous plant species belonging to the genus Plumeria. Originally native to Mexico, Central America, Colombia and Venezuela, it has been widely cultivated in subtropical and tropical climates worldwide and is a popular garden and park plant, as well as being used in temples and cemeteries. It grows as a spreading tree to 7–8 m (23–26 ft) high and wide, and is flushed with fragrant flowers of shades of pink, white and yellow over the summer and autumn.

Its common names include frangipani, red paucipan, red-jasmine, red frangipani, common frangipani, temple tree, calachuchi, or simply plumeria. Despite its common name, the species is not a "true jasmine" and not of the genus Jasminum.

== Taxonomy ==
Plumeria rubra was one of the many species first described by Carl Linnaeus, and appeared in the 1753 edition of Species Plantarum. Its specific epithet is derived from the Latin ruber "red". The epithets acuminata, acutifolia, and lutea are seen, but these are invalid.

== Common names ==
The common name "frangipani" comes from the Italian Frangipani family, a sixteenth-century marquess of which invented a plumeria-scented perfume. The genus name honors Charles Plumier, who was a French monk of the Franciscan order, and a botanist.

In its native range in Mexico the common name is cacaloxochitl or cacaloxuchitl. The name comes from Nahuatl and means "crow's flower". It is also commonly known in Mexico as Flor de Mayo. P. rubra was declared the national flower of Nicaragua in 1971, where it is known as sacuanjoche. In Spanish, frangipanis are also referred to as alhelí, alhelí cimarrón, and suche.

P. rubra entered Southeast Asia via the Manila galleons from Mexico to the Philippines in the 1560s. It retained the Nahuatl-derived name in the Philippine languages where it is known as kalachuchi (also spelled kalatsutsi), or calachuchi in Philippine English. The Nahuatl name is also partly preserved in the Ternate common name tsjutsju, derived from the Philippine name. In other parts of Indonesia and Malaysia, it acquired different names like Malay: cempaka derived from the resemblance of its fragrance to the champaca tree; it also acquired the name bunga kemboja (literally "flower of Cambodia") in Malay invoking its foreign origin, though there is none evidence of its spread from Cambodia. Due to its associations with graveyards and death, it is also known as bunga kuburan, literally "grave flower".

In the Pacific Islands where it was introduced in the late 19th century, P. rubra is known as melia in Hawaii, and tipani in the Cook Islands.

Elsewhere, it is known as champa (or a derivative thereof) in India and Pakistan. It is known by many names in Brazil, including jasmim-de-caiena, jasmim-do-pará, and jasmim-manga. In Portuguese, it is also known as flor-de-Santo-Antônio. In Cambodia it is given the names châmpéi krahâ:m (also romanised as krahom, meaning 'red'), or châmpéi slük sruëch, while the French term for the species is frangipanier à fleurs rouges. In Sri Lanka, it is known as araliya in Sinhalese. In Myanmar, it is referred to as mawk-sam-ka, mawk-sam-pailong, and sonpabataing. In China, it has the common name ji dan hua, and in the United States, it is referred to as nosegay.

== Description ==
Plumeria rubra belongs to the dogbane family and grows as a spreading shrub or small tree to a height of 2–8 m (5–25 ft) and similar width. It has a thick succulent trunk and sausage-like blunt branches covered with a thin grey bark. The branches are somewhat brittle and when broken, ooze a white latex that can be irritating to the skin and mucous membranes. This latex found in the stem of the plants is in fact toxic, but not deadly unless present in large quantities. The large green leaves can reach 30 to 50 cm (12 to 20 in) long and are arranged alternately and clustered at the end of the branches. The boles of these plants can be up to 25 cm in the wild. It tends to be smaller in cultivation.

They are deciduous, falling in the cooler months of the year. The flowers are terminal, appearing at the ends of branches over the summer. Often profuse and very prominent, they are strongly fragrant, and have five petals. The flowers give off their fragrance in the morning and in the evening,. The sweet fragrance functions as an attractant of hawkmoths, the primary pollinators of the species. This fragrance is similar to that of rose, citrus, and cinnamon. The colors range from the common pink to white with shades of yellow in the centre of the flower. Initially tubular before opening out, the flowers are 5–7.5 cm (2–3 in) in diameter, and only rarely go on to produce seed - 20-60 winged seeds are contained in a 17.5 cm (7 in) pod. The tubular corolla is well-suited for the elongated proboscides of the hawkmoth, allowing successful pollen transfer during visits of the flowers. The fruits are cylindrical pods that are rarely found in cultivation.

== Pollination ==
The Plumeria Rubra species is primarily pollinated by hawkmoths. The flowers produce a strong fragrance that becomes more prominent in the evening and nighttime, aligning with the period of greatest hawkmoth activity. Although the flowers attract pollinators through fragrance and appearance, they actually produce little to no nectar, a pollination strategy known as deceptive pollination.

While searching for nectar, the hawkmoths insert their long proboscides into the flower's tubular corolla, where they come into contact with the reproductive structures of the flower and transfer pollen. Studies have reported several hawkmoths carrying Plumeria flower pollen, demonstrating their role as effective pollinators.

== Distribution and habitat ==
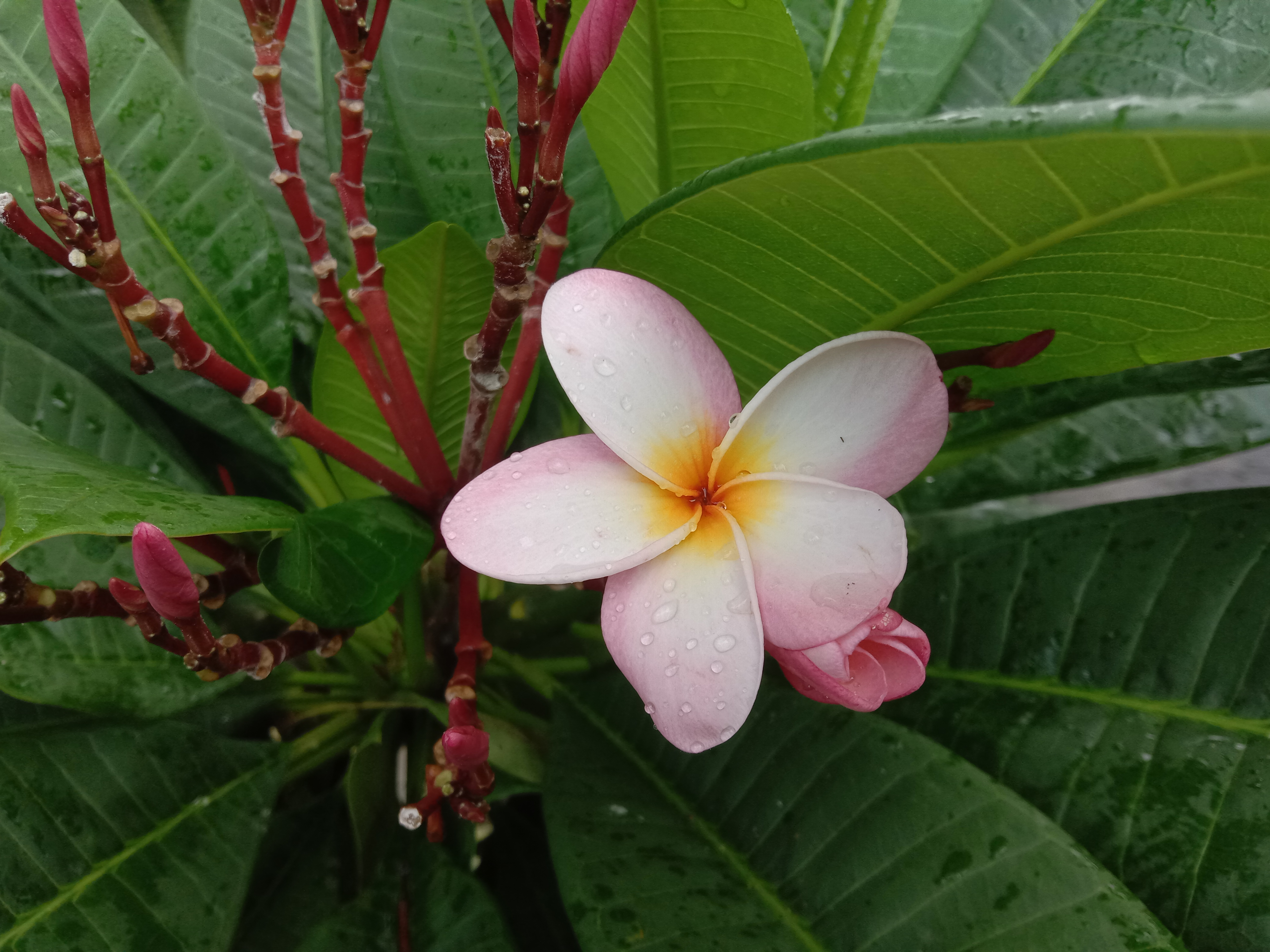
Flower of Plumeria rubra in West Bengal, India.

Its native range extends from Baja California into central Mexico south through Central America (Costa Rica, Nicaragua, Guatemala, El Salvador, Belize, Honduras, Panama) to the Department of Antioquia in Colombia and Venezuela in South America. It is cultivated widely in tropical and subtropical regions of the world, and has become naturalized in most parts of tropical Asia and the Pacific Islands.

P. rubra was introduced in the 1560s into the Philippines during the Spanish colonial period. From there, it spread to the rest of Southeast Asia and into other parts of the Asia. It was also introduced into the Pacific Islands in the late 19th century, where it has since become iconic due to their use in leis.

P. rubra generally inhabits hot and rocky areas with dry to moderate rainfall. They can survive in locations with prominent dry seasons, where they can flower on the bare branches, or in more humid conditions, where they can remain evergreen. It can also be found in rocky forests, mountain slopes, and even occasionally on plains or savannas. It occupies elevations from sea level to 1000 meters but can be found up to elevations of 1500 meters.

== Cultivation ==
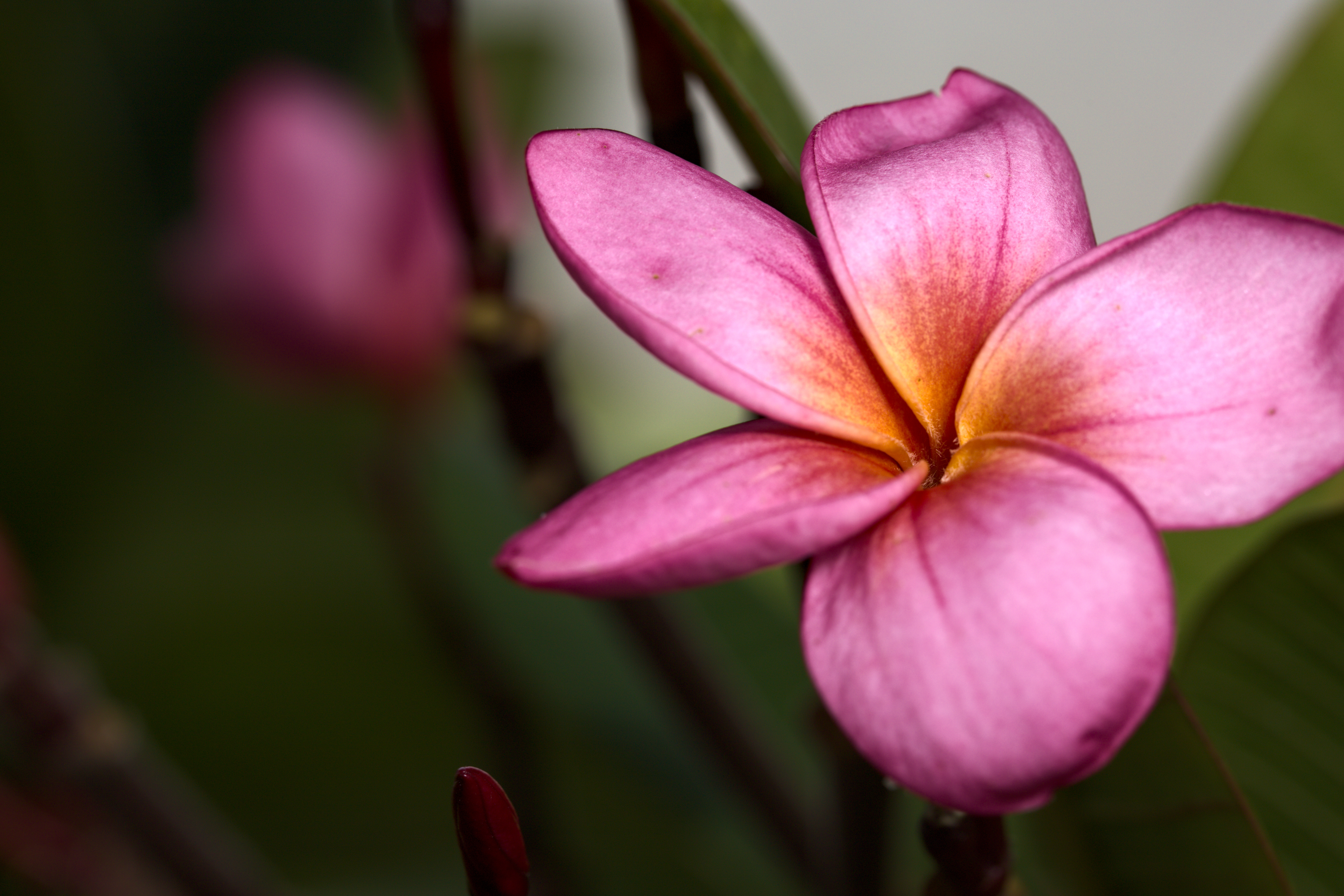
A flowering Plumeria rubra in Piracicaba, Brazil.

The species is cultivated around the world in subtropical and tropical climates. In Australia, it is widely seen in cultivation in Sydney and Perth and warmer frost free climates northwards. In the mainland United States, it tolerates USDA Hardiness zones 10B to 11 (southern coastal California and the southern tip of Florida). It is also grown in Hawaii to an altitude of 2000 m. They tolerate a wide variety of soils, from acid to alkaline and sandy to clay. These plants grow best in dry to medium moisture, well-drained soils in full sun and will bloom through most of the year in tropical areas. They do not grow well in wet soils and in areas with temperatures below 10 °C (50 °F) during the winter seasons, the plants will stop blooming and shed their leaves. Established plants are also very salt tolerant and tolerate even salt-laden winds. Widely available in nurseries, frangipanis are readily propagated by cuttings of branches taken in cooler months and left to dry for a week or more. As well as gardens and street- and park planting, frangipanis are planted in temples and cemeteries.

Plumeria rubra is an important crop in Hawaii, with over 14 million flowers sold to be used in leis there in 2005.

In temperate areas P. rubra must be grown under glass, in a large conservatory or similar, due to its requirement for warm conditions. However it may be placed outside in a sheltered sunny spot during the summer months. In the United Kingdom it has gained the Royal Horticultural Society's Award of Garden Merit.

Some forms in cultivation are hybrids between this species and Plumeria obtusa; these have rounded rather than pointed leaves and are less likely to be deciduous. The white and yellow flowered "Singapore" cultivar, also from the United States, usually holds its leaves all year round in Hawaii.

Coleosporium plumeriae, known as plumeria rust or frangipani rust, is a fungus which attacks young leaves of P. rubra. It causes a brownish or orange powdery coating or blistering of leaves. It has been recorded from Hawaii and the east coast of Australia. It was first recognised by the French mycologist Narcisse Théophile Patouillard on Guadeloupe Island in the eastern Caribbean in 1902, and had reached Taiwan by 2005.

== Uses ==
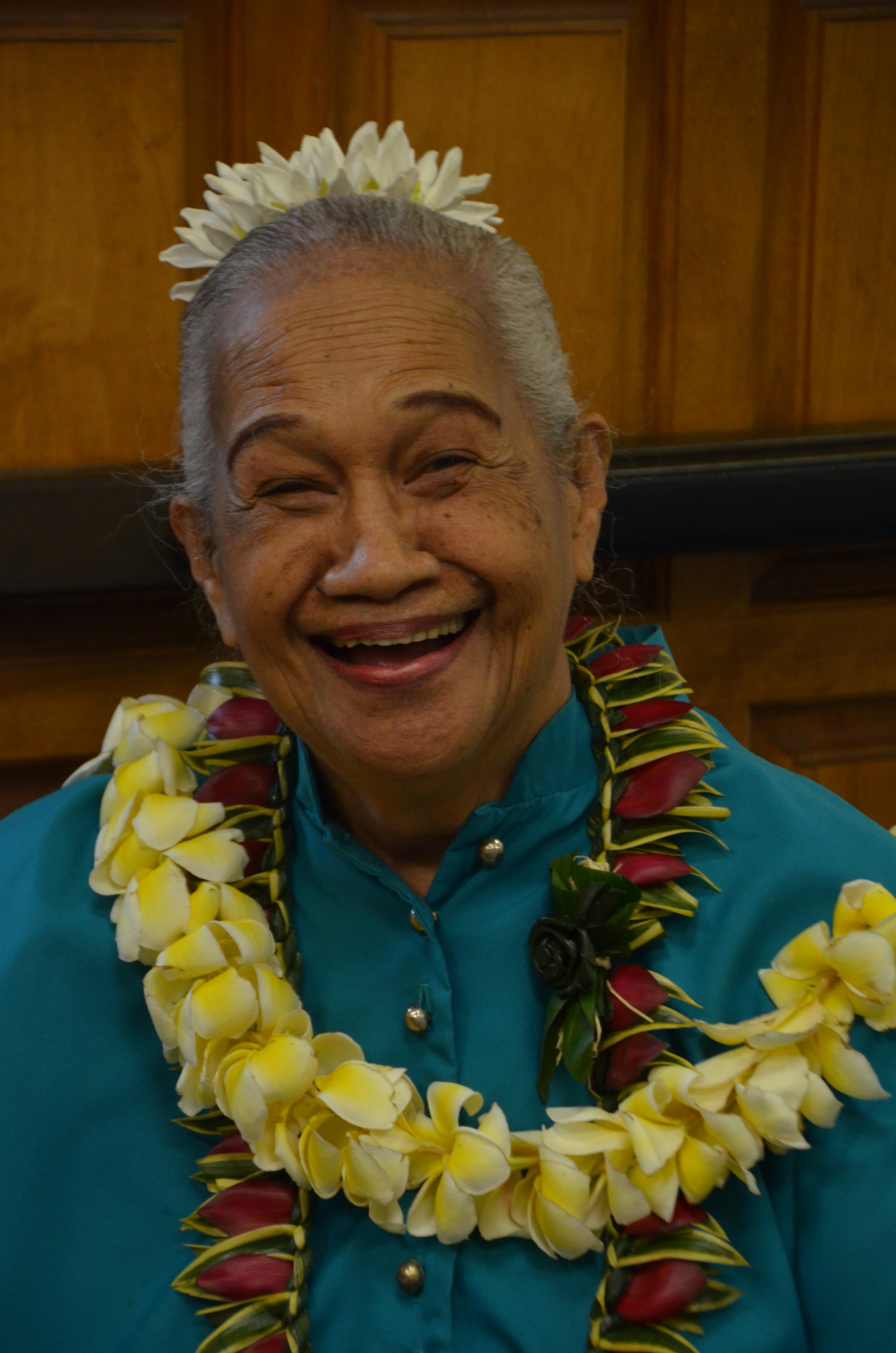
Florence Iwalani Koanui with Lei from white and yellow pua melia

The USDA Forestry Service lists Plumeria rubra as a poisonous plant and warns against touching or eating any part of the plant.

In Cambodia, as with other Plumeria species, P. rubra flowers is used for necklaces, as offerings to deities or as decoration for coffins. The leaves of this species are used in the care of sores and made into soothing infusions. The flowers and bark of it are also used in traditional Chinese medicine in the treatment of fever, bacillary dysentery, pertussis and so on. Chinese herbal teas such as Wang Lao Ji also contain P. rubra.

P. rubra possesses fulvoplumierin, an antibiotic that inhibits the growth of Mycobacterium tuberculosis. The plant has also been shown to be an antifungal, antiviral, analgesic, antispasmodic, and hypoglycemic. P. rubra is also reported to contain agoniadin, plumierid, plumeric acid, cerotinic acid, and lupeol, and the stem possesses an alkaloid called triterpinoid. The plant has been known to promote digestion and excretion, along with respiratory and immune functions. The sap of the plant is used as a laxative and is a remedy for bloating and stomachaches. The bark is said to be purgative and is also used for venereal sores. The flowers can be boiled in water or juice and made into a salad to promote bowel movement, urine flow, and to control gas and phlegm. The flowers are also used in the treatment of asthma.

On the Molokai island in the Hawaiian archipelago, P. rubra is cultivated in order to produce neck garlands (leis). They are also used to make a scented oil in many Pacific islands that include Hawaii. The flowers are used to scent coconut oil. The bark contains faint purplish streaks and the wood is hard and compact with a very fine texture. The wood takes a high polish.

== As a symbol ==
Plumeria rubra is the national flower of Nicaragua, where it is known under the local name sacuanjoche, as well as of Laos, where it is known under the local name dok champa. It is also used as the logo of Lao Airlines, the national airline of Laos.

Plumeria rubra is also the village flower of Asan-Maina on Guam.

Plumeria rubra also has great symbolic value in both Hinduism and Buddhism. In Hinduism, it connotes both devotion and eternity, and as such, is often planted near Hindu temples. Within the temples themselves, the flowers are often placed at the feet of statues of various gods. Plumeria rubra can also be found as part of the landscaping of Buddhist temples. Since the flower renews itself in all kinds of weather, it connotes rebirth.

== Gallery ==
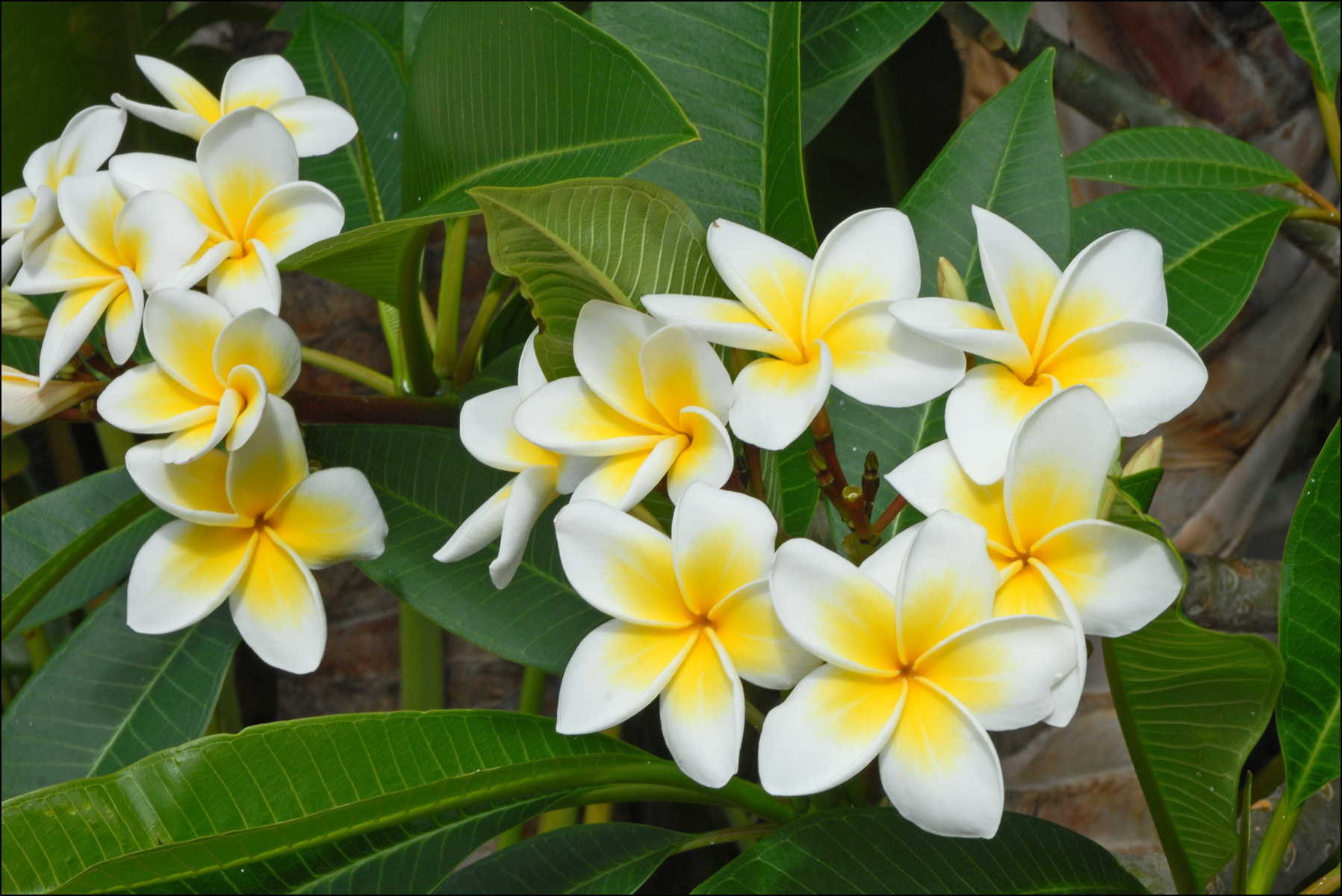
Close-up on flowers of a white variant

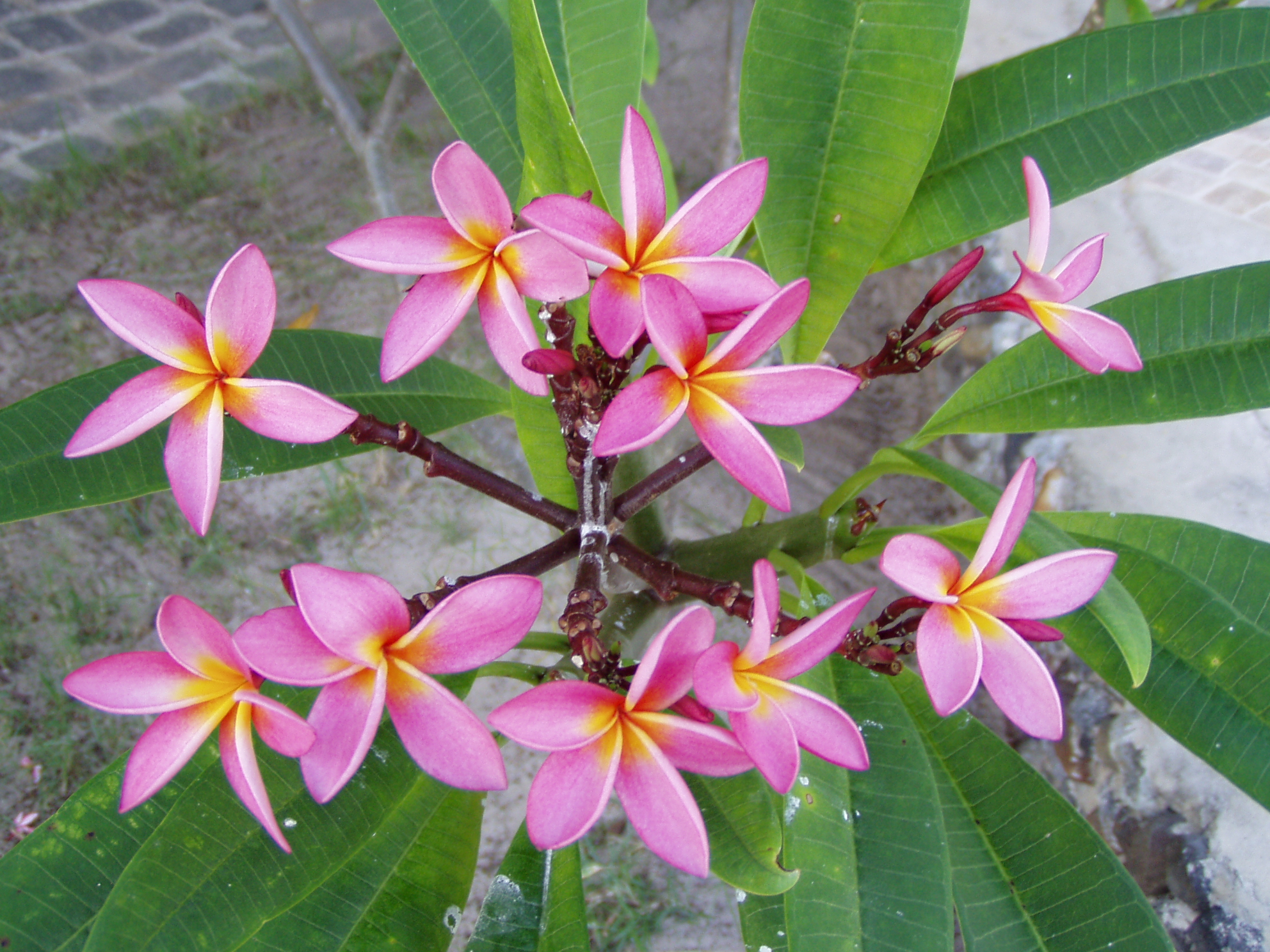
Close-up on flowers of a pink variant

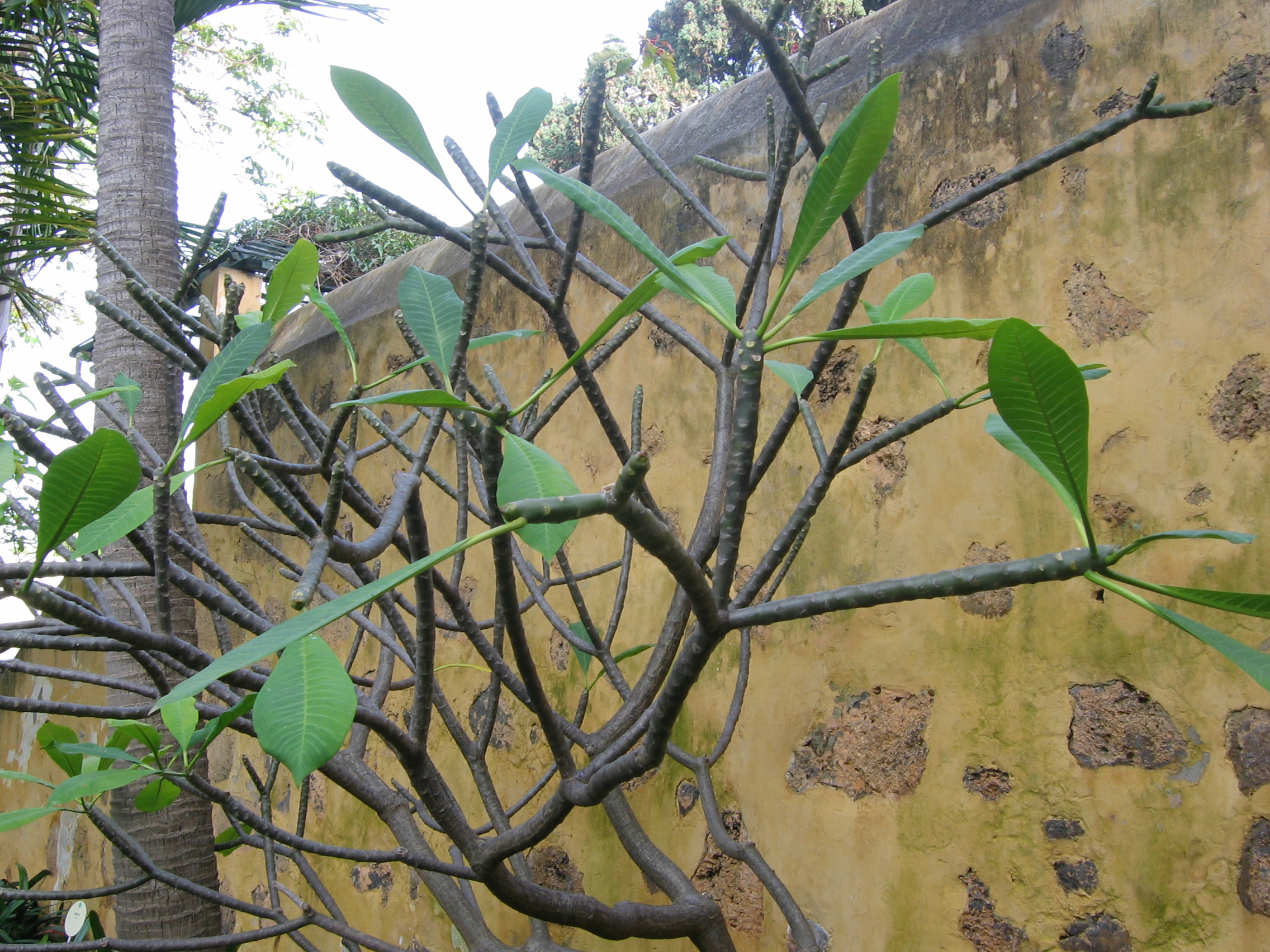
Leaves sprouting

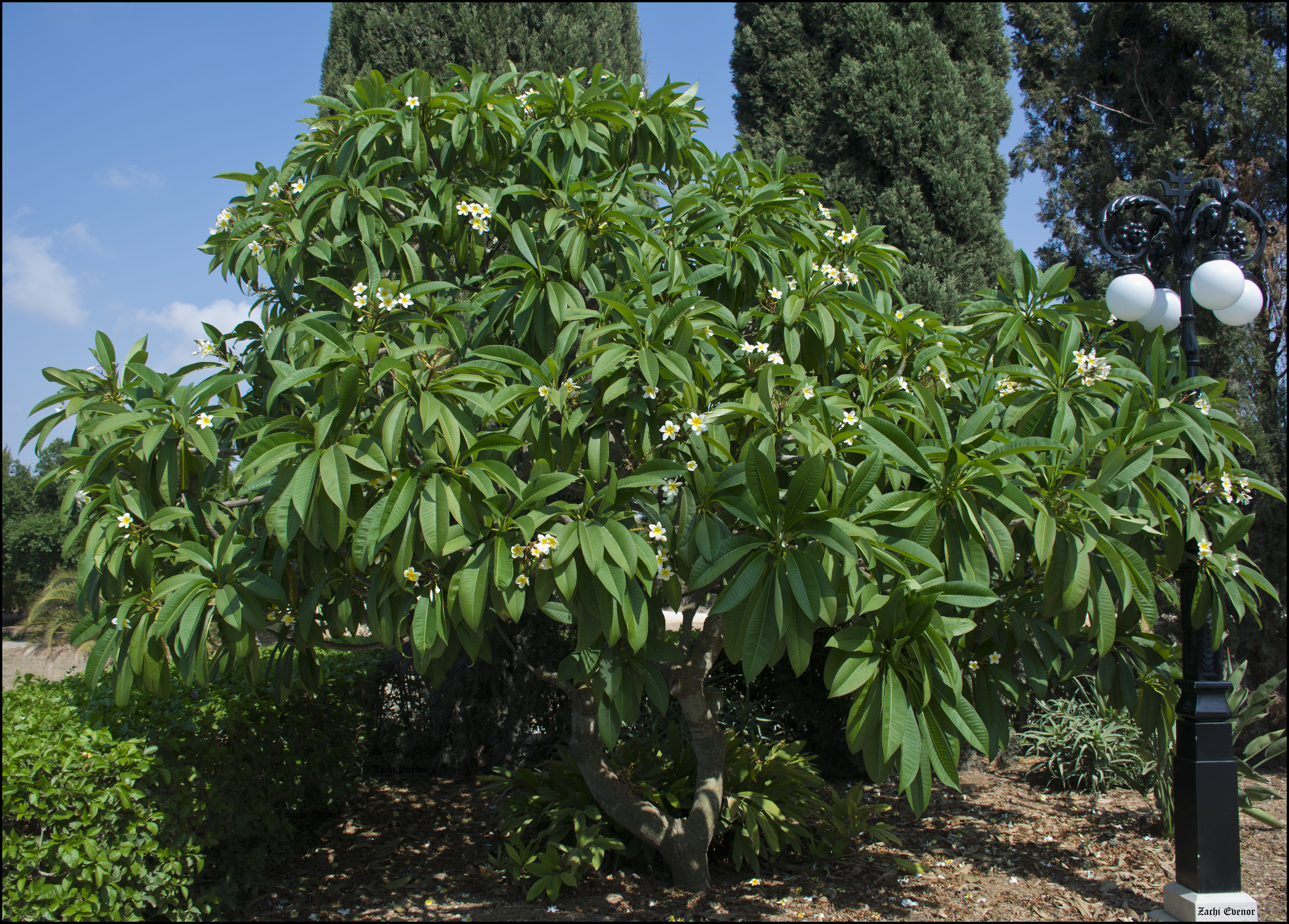
White Plumeria rubra tree

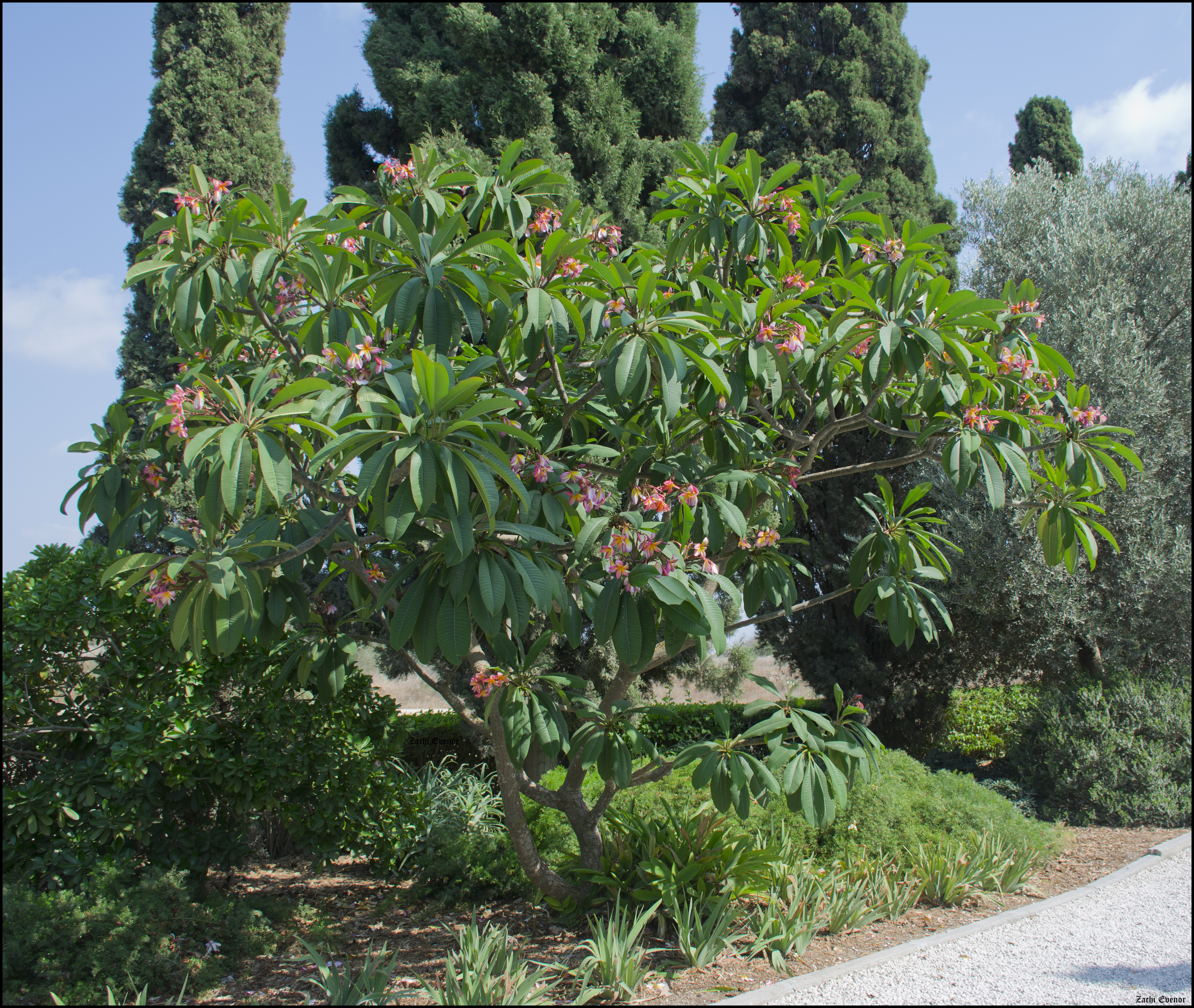
Pink Plumeria rubra tree

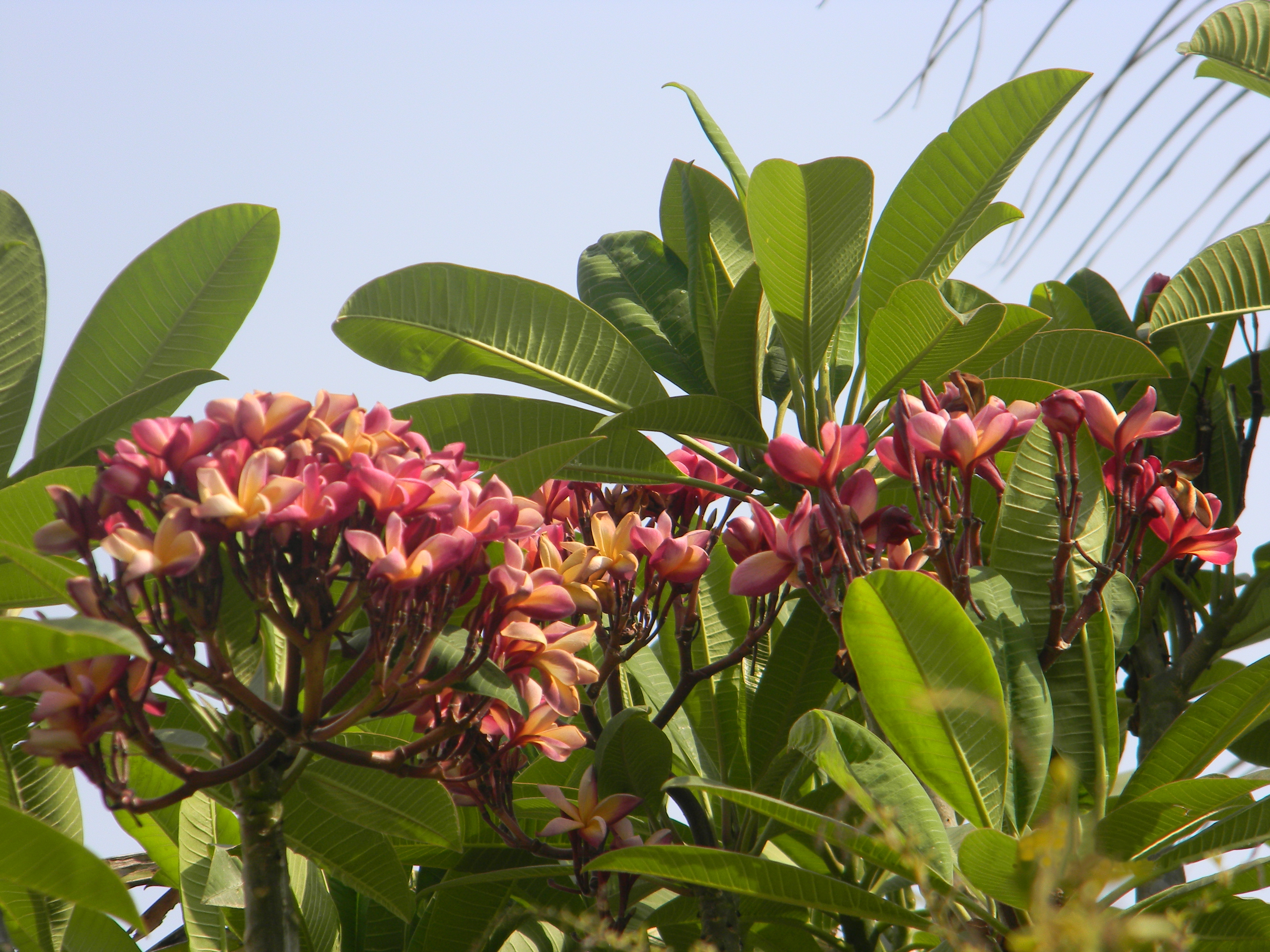
Red frangipani in Warje, India.

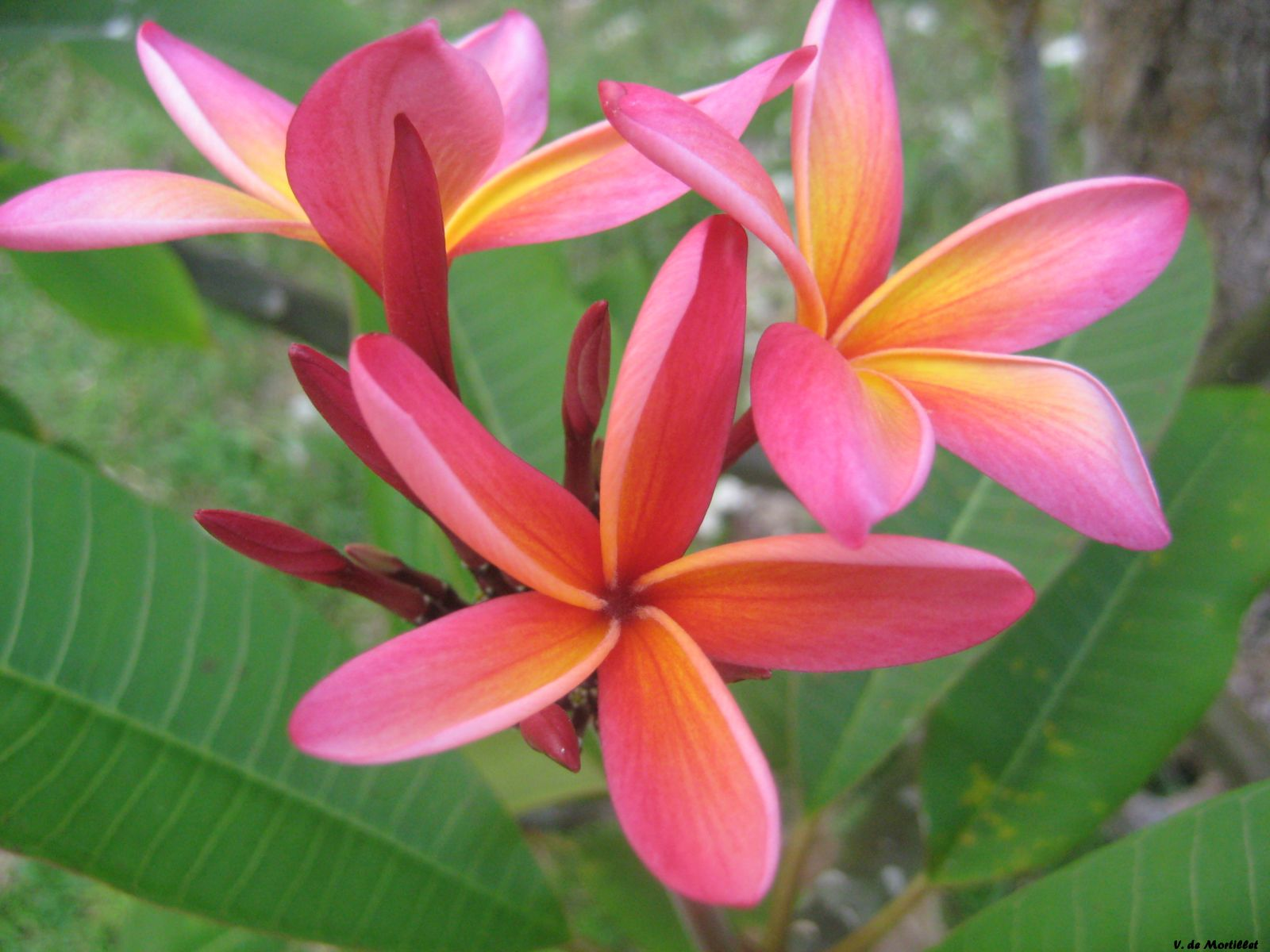
Plumeria rubra in Tahiti

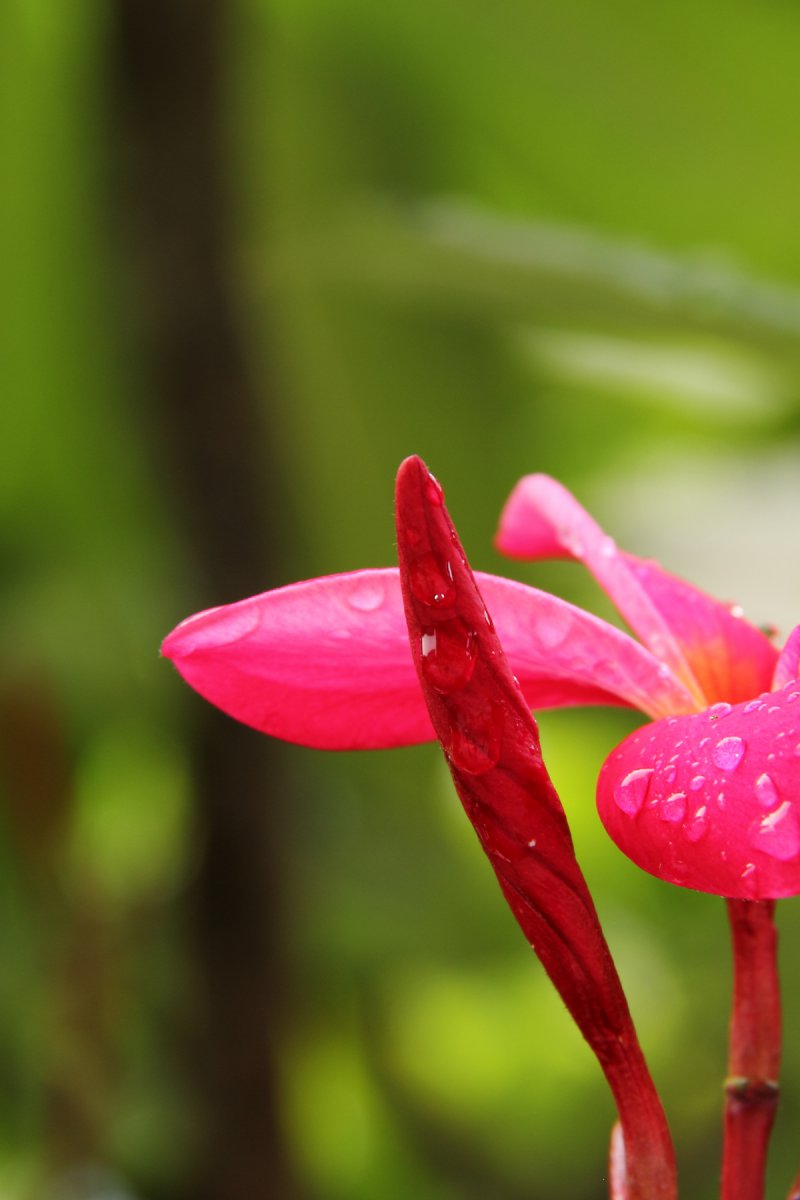
Plumeria rubra in China

Frangipani rust (caused by the fungus Coleosporium plumeriae)

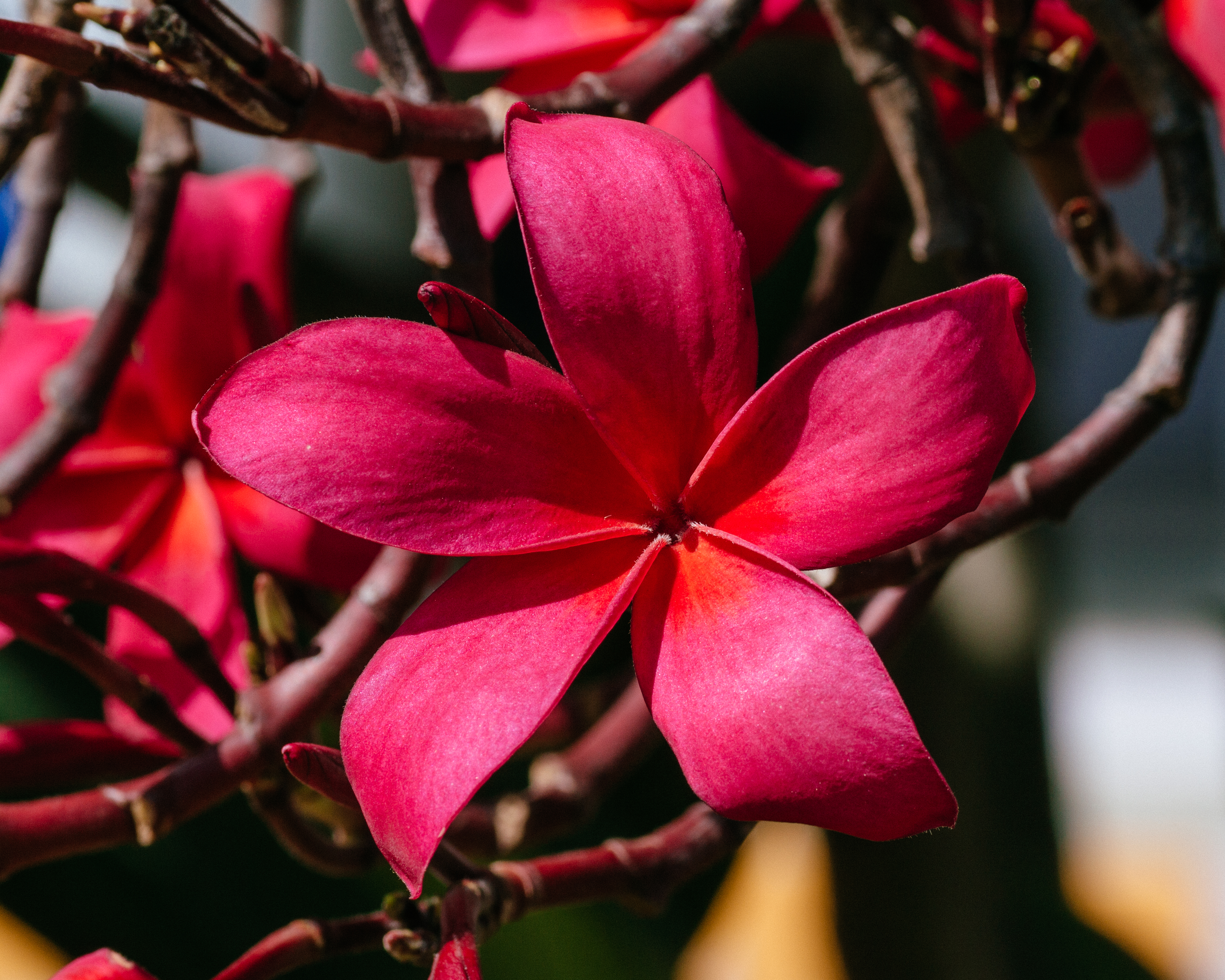
Closeup of Plumeria rubra in Jamshedpur

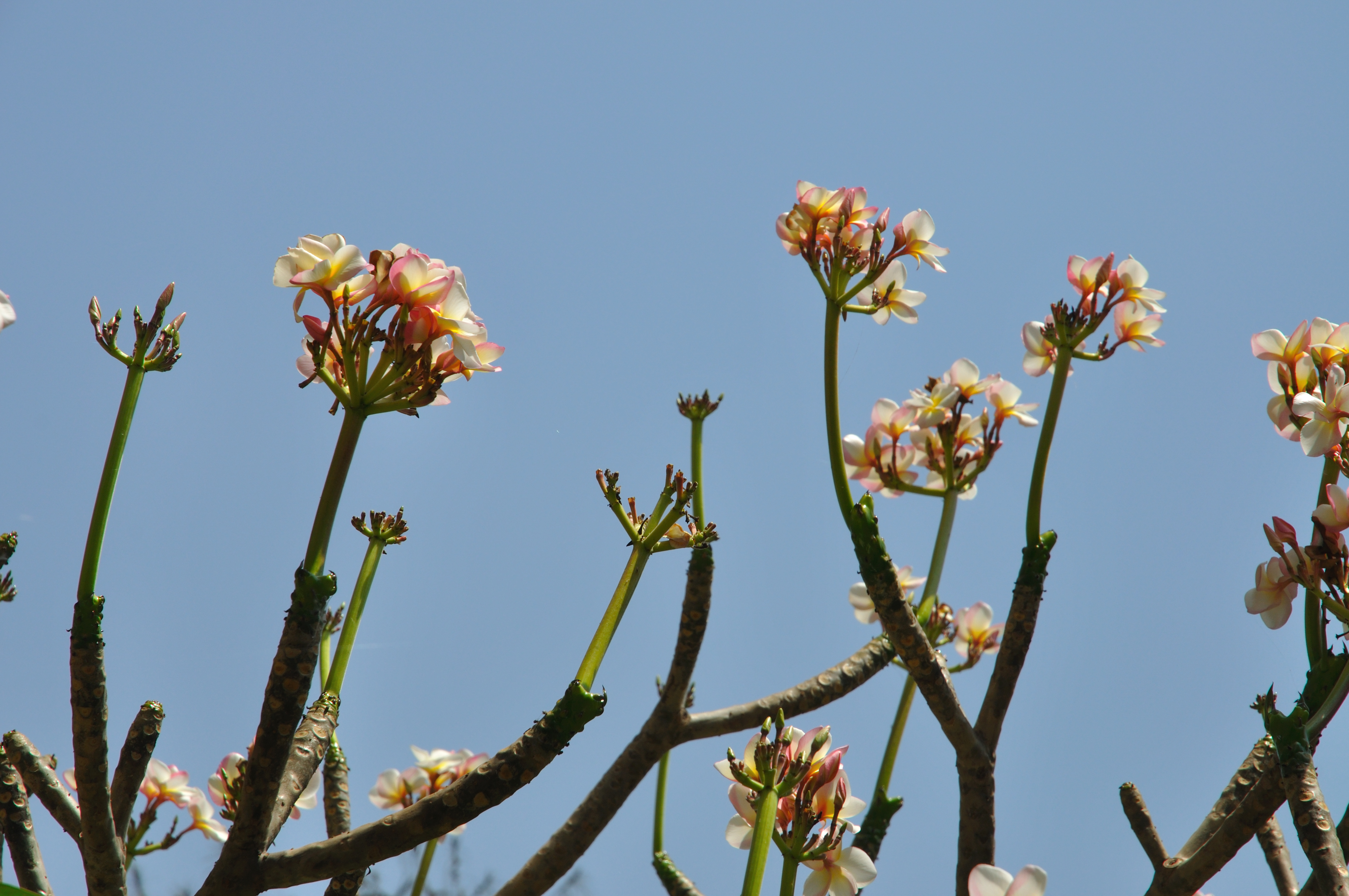
Plumeria rubra flowering when bare
