= Ardsilla =

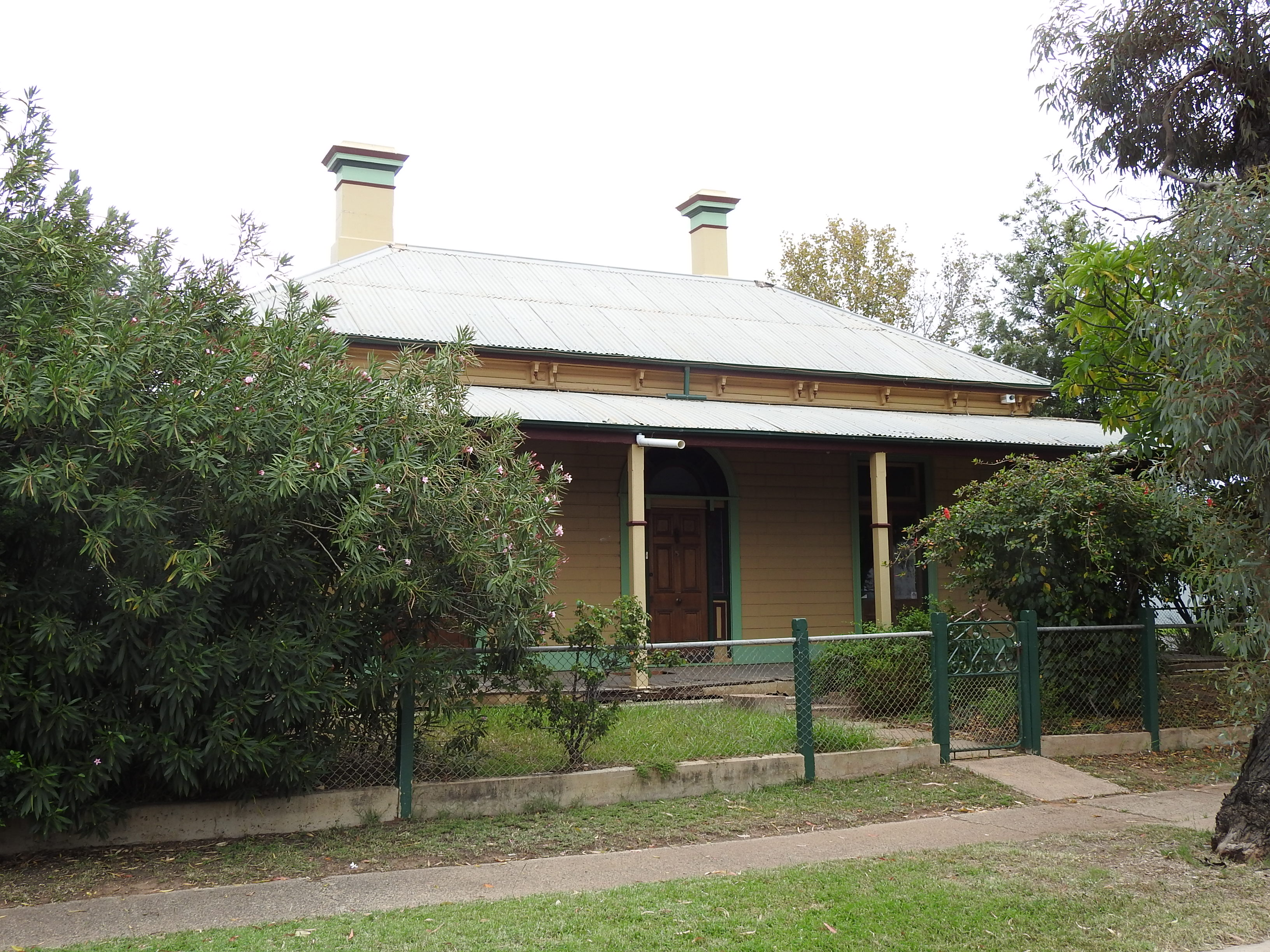
- Richard Street north-east corner (2021).

- Location within New South Wales
- 30.0930°S 145.9368°E
- Location: 5 Richard Street, Bourke, Bourke Shire, New South Wales, Australia

Site notes
- Owner: Bernie Wilder

New South Wales Heritage Register
- Official name: Ardsilla
- Type: state heritage (built)
- Designated: 2 April 1999
- Reference no.: 198
- Type: House
- Category: Residential buildings (private)

Ardsilla is a heritage-listed house at 5 Richard Street, Bourke, in the Far West region of New South Wales, Australia. It has also been known as Brigalow and was briefly the Brigalow Private Hospital. It was added to the New South Wales State Heritage Register on 2 April 1999.

== History ==
Ardsilla was built in the 1890s by William Gale. Gale had come from Penrith as a teamster and built a sawmill and timber yard at the corner of Anson and Richard Streets. Gale was also the first owner and licensee of the Central Australian Hotel, also located in Anson Street. He donated land for the Port Bourke Stockade Reserve. His son, William Charles Gale remained in Bourke and was later a businessman and alderman there.

Ardsilla was then bought by William Glover along with other items of the business interests from the Gale family. In 1932 Dr Levings bought the house. It was the "Brigalow" Private Hospital started by Matron Winifred Stowe together with Henrietta Letitia Glover (née McCullach), wife of William Glover above, in 1938. In 1939 the house was bought by Dr. Vincent Malcolm Putland (Captain Putland), who was an army medical officer, then Dr Coolican (snr) who practiced there from 1940 to 1948. It was then sold to Dr R. F. E. (Ted) Collican, who left Bourke in 1970 and died in 1978.

The property was then in poor condition and the Council proposed its demolition however it was purchased by Dr David and Jenny Sutherland in the early 1980s who restored the building and were instrumental in having a Permanent Conservation Order placed on it. The Sutherlands then also left town, at which time the building was purchased by a local businesswoman. It remains a private residence.

A series of alterations were made at unknown dates: the verandah was infilled and had a laundry in it, a carport was installed and a chain wire fence replaced the original picket. It was proposed in 2011 to remove these changes and restore the house to its previous condition.

Part of the verandah was restored using local heritage funding in 2010.

== Description ==
Ardsilla is a single storey Victorian timber residence with weatherboards grooved to simulate ashlar masonry. Eaves feature elegant timber brackets with pendants. The roof is corrugated iron and is hipped. Two rendered masonry chimneys feature mouldings at the cappings. The ogee gutters have acroterion corner ornaments. The verandah which runs along the north, south and east sides of the house features a curved convex corrugated iron roof. The verandah posts are chamfered timber with collar. From the verandah, large French doors with timber architraves, moulded transom and fanlight lead into the house. Parts of the verandah have been infilled to create an ensuite, storage room and laundry at the rear.

The house sits on gidgee stumps.

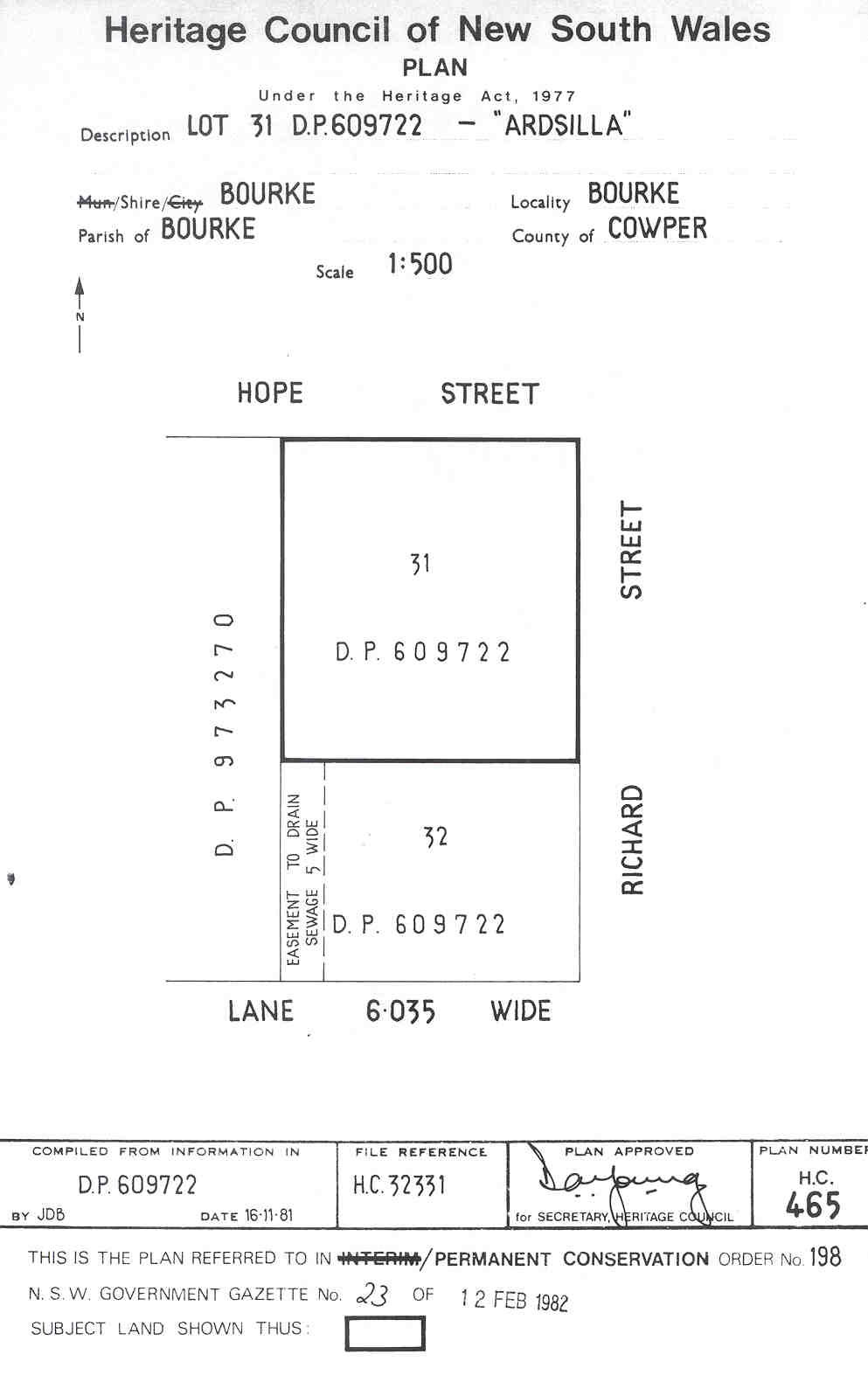
Heritage boundaries

Interior

The front door (east side) is flanked by a pair of French doors, each half-glazed and with bolection mouldings below, fanlight above and moulded architraves. The front door itself has a six panel bolection moulding, a bold, semi-circular fanlight above with coloured and etched glass, and two sidelights of single-panelled etched glass. The door leads to an unusually small lobby 1.5 metres (4 ft 11 in) long, from which a double door also with bolection moulded panels below and etched glass, leads to the main hall. this door also has sidelights and fanlight with the coloured etched glass, matching the front door.

The front hall features an unusual timber lining, split into two panels with opposing diagonal 'V'-jointed panelling and a horizontal rail mid-way, with vertical boarding above. Corbelled brackets support a central arch in the hall which has boarded work on its underside.

From the hall, matching pairs of four-panelled doors lead north and south to the front rooms which feature marble fireplaces, original skirtings, vertical wood beading, flush panelling, timber cornices and wood panelled ceilings. Timber vents in these rooms are apparently connected by metal piping to a central collection point under the house.

The master bedroom features a fine white marble fireplace with tiled panels of sepia birds and floral floor tiles.

The study fireplace is in red marble also with sepia tiled panels. the two central bedrooms feature similar skirting and vertical beaded panelling, a combination repeated throughout the house.

On the western side there is a large living area, virtually an arcade, leading to small rooms on either side.

Site

The rear yard swimming pool and surrounding structures are recent additions.

A flat roofed carport erected immediately west of the filled-in section of the verandah is not regarded as significant.

The garden contains a number of traditional plantings which may be remnant: oleander (Nerium oleander), frangipani (Plumeria rubra) and fig (Ficus sp.).

Condition and renovation proposals

Ardsilla was reported as being in generally good condition in 1999, with some verandah sections in need of repair.

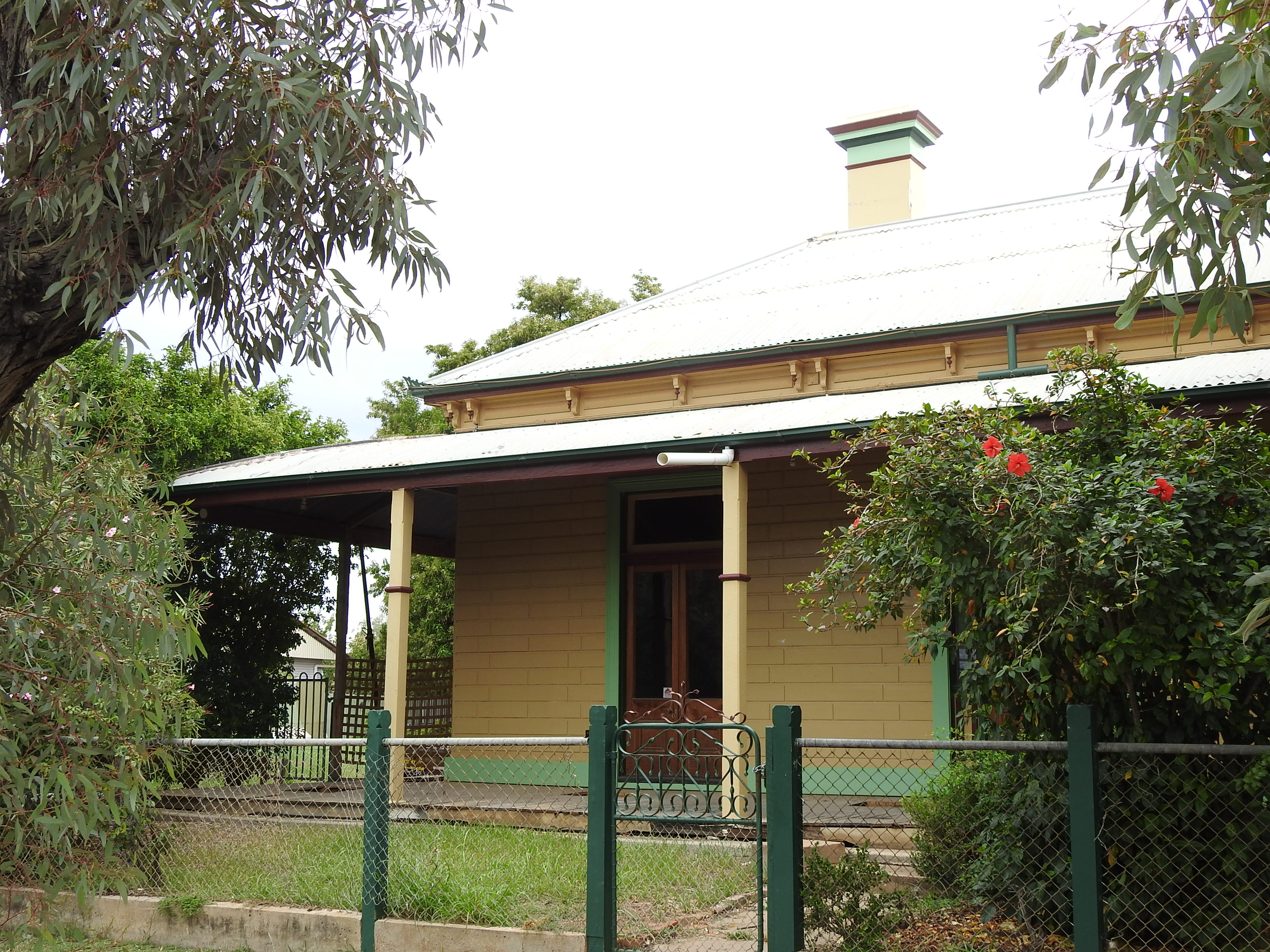
Richard Street south-east corner (2021).

In 2011, the owners requested heritage funding for a range of repairs to the property. These included:

- proposed repairs to stumps and levelling, reinstating the existing Gidgee stumps to proper levels and replacing damaged stumps with ones of the same material in an adjacent location
- chocking the floor as required to reinstate level and stable conditions
- restoring the verandah at the north-west corner by removal of inappropriate infill and relocating the laundry to the bathroom.
- retaining original verandah posts, replacing missing post and capital detail to all posts (12) and floor (levelling as required)
- replacing guttering with ogee profile to match main roof and paint per scrapes
- replacing existing chain wire fence and gates with timber picket fence to original detail per historic photos.
- restoring internal woodwork and fittings to original detail, stripping paint and applying original finish.
- repairing and replacing locks and fittings with original detail

They also proposed to demolish and replace the carport at this time.

== Heritage listing ==
'Ardsilla' is a particularly intact example of an ornate late nineteenth century home built on an unusual plan and displaying fine craftsmanship. It has strong links with the general story of Bourke having been built for a prominent businessman and hotel-owner, William Gale (1846-1917) It was at that time called "Brigalow", and became "Brigalow" Private Hospital under Matron Winifred Stone in 1938. Before and after this it was the home and sometimes surgery of a number of Bourke doctors.

Ardsilla was listed on the New South Wales State Heritage Register on 2 April 1999.
