= Cencio =

Cencio (pronounced [ˈtʃɛntʃo]) is an Italian male given name, most common in the Middle Ages, originating as an apheretic form of Vincenzo or Innocenzo. Notable people with the name include:

- Cencio I Frangipane (fl. 11th century), Italian nobleman
- Cencio II Frangipane (fl. 12th century), Italian nobleman
- Cencio Mantovani (1941–1989), Italian cyclist
- Cencio Massola (1885–1944), Italian sports sailor
- Cencio Savelli (c. 1150–1227), head of the Catholic Church and ruler of the Papal States as Pope Honorius III

== See also ==
- Cencio la Parolaccia, a restaurant in Trastevere, Rome
- Cenci
- Cenzo
