= National symbols of Laos =

The national symbols of Laos are official and unofficial flags, icons or cultural expressions that are emblematic, representative or otherwise characteristic of Laos and of its culture.

== Symbol ==
Title	Name of symbol	Picture
National flag	Flag of Laos	
Coat of arms	Coat of arms of Laos	
National anthem	Pheng Xat Lao	Pheng Xat Lao
National flower	Dok Champa	
National bird	Siamese Fireback	
National animal	Elephant	
National dish	Laap	
