= Fragapane =

Fragapane is a surname. Notable people with the surname include:

- Claudia Fragapane (born 1997), British artistic gymnast
- Franco Fragapane (born 1993), Argentine footballer
