= Antinisca Cenci =

Italian rider with Down syndrome (born 1978)

- Born: 1978 (age 47–48) Noventa Vicentina, Italy
- Occupation: Equestrian vaulter, activist
- Language: Italian
- Citizenship: Italian
- Notable awards: BBC 100 Women

Antinisca Cenci (born 1978) is an Italian rider with Down syndrome who specializes in equestrian vaulting.

== Personal and professional life ==
Cenci was baptised shortly after birth because doctors informed her mother that she would not survive her first cold. By contrast, Antinisca survived her childhood and cultivated a personality full of energy. At the age of thirty he began to train in the discipline of equestrian vaulting . This initiative was part of the integration program of the local ANFFAS center (Italian National Association for Families and People with Disabilities) and the La Fenice team.

== Activism ==
Aside from sports, Cenci is part of the association Inclusion Europe, which works for the rights of people with intellectual disabilities.

In 2023, she participated in the Verona Fieracavalli, where he had the opportunity to hold talks with the Italian Minister for Disabilities, Alessandra Locatelli.
