= Cenci Journalism Project =

Cenci Journalism Project (Chinese: 参差计划), founded in 2011, is the first new media in Mainland China that uses multi-lingual and global perspectives to continuously cover marginalized topics.

Cenci was founded by five graduates from Beijing Foreign Studies University, including Xia Kang and Zhe Qu, on August 6, 2011. The goal of Cenci was to eliminate the language barriers in news reading, create an alternative reading perspective in visualized reports, and provide sources for comparative news. Its founders wished to tie understanding of news closer to truth. When the website was first launched, Cenci’s slogan was “Same Events, Diversified reports”, which was modified to “Any Language, Any Perspective, Anything Cenci”. As Cenci transitioned into version 3.0, the new slogan was set to be “Reporting another Dimension of the World”.

On July 14, 2014, the Cenci Journalism Project website became inaccessible from mainland China. At the same time, multiple web-related services used by the project contributors also became inaccessible, including Weibo accounts, WeChat accounts, Douban.com accounts, and QQ chat groups. It is assumed by founding member Kang Xia that these disruptions were coordinated acts of censorship by the Chinese government.

== History ==
The Cenci Journalism Project was founded on August 8, 2011, by Xia Kang and Zhe Qu. Until 2012 November, Cenci Journalism Project has been available via RSS . The number of participants of the project has reached to 400, and over 2,000 pieces of news have been translated and edited into English, Arabic, German, French, Russian, Japanese, Italian, Spanish and Korean and more than twenty other languages like Polish, Icelandic, Serbo-Croat and Albanian.

== Operating pattern ==
Cenci Journalism Project does not accept any donations from foundations or individuals. The founders provided funds to cover all of Cenci’s expenses generated by the server, operations, and activities. Cenci’s Editor-in-Chief, section directors, section editors, associate editors and translators are all volunteers who work online. When reporting, Cenci adopts new media methods such as crowd-sourcing news, crowd-sourcing translation, and collaborative reporting. The content is edited using the traditional “three levels of editing” method.

In Cenci 3.0, the “inverted pyramid” structure is replaced by “The News Diamond” model, which makes use of audio, video, data visualization, interactive design, all media platforms, and “Next Plan” media cooperation projects to provide a more complete form of convergent reporting in Chinese media.

Cenci Journalism Project has about 400 volunteer translators, a group that translates languages such as English, Arabic, German, French, Russian, Japanese, Italian, Spanish, Korean, Polish, Icelandic, Slovene, Serbian, Croatian, and Albanian into Chinese. Cenci is able to follow 54 media outlets in a variety of countries.

== Cenci stories ==
In May 2012 Cenci Journalism Project launched its first sharing session. Up to March 2014, Cenci Journalism Project had around 140,000 subscribers, including 3,200 Chinese scholars and media professionals. According to a readers’ survey in mid-2013, subscribers to Cenci have more educated backgrounds in general (47% of the subscribers hold master's degrees or above; 54% of the subscribers earn annual salaries of RMB 250,000 and above). Since it was founded, Cenci has provided more than 6,000 translated articles from medias around the world and original stories. Cenci maintains good relationships with both Chinese mainstream media and new media.

During the 2012 National People’s Congress and Chinese People’s Political Consultative Conference (The Two Conferences), with the assistance of Wei Han (Head of PressMine), Cenci Journalism Project cooperated with Sohu Business to follow foreign reports on the event, in which articles by Cenci were published on Sohu Business Channel first. Within the 7 days of The Two Conferences, translators at Cenci provided Chinese readers with more than 30 relevant articles from 7 different languages.

After the online version of Cenci Journalism Project was launched in 2012, its articles were recommended by Fangzhou Jiang (Associate Editor-in-Chief of New Weekly), Yu Liu (Cambridge University Lecturer in Politics), and Mark H. Rowswell (known as freelance performer “Dashan” in China, famous for his appearances on CCTV New Year’s Gala). Its articles also stirred heated discussions on the North Korean issue among users of Weibo.

During the Taiwanese presidential election in January 2012, Jianzhuang Wang (Editor-in-Chief of China Times in Taiwan) authorized Cenci Journalism Project to publish his commentary “Ing-wen Tsai’s Pie”, and Xinzhong Liao (bestselling author in Taiwan) also authorized Cenci to publish his story, “Mainlander”.

The following people also provided authorizations for Cenci Journalism Project: media professionals such as Shuo Wang (Editor-in-Chief of Caixin Media), Ti An, Xiao Yang (chief commentator at Nanfang People Magazine, Harvard Nieman fellow), Baowei Zheng (Director of Chinese Journalism Society), foreign authors such as Kiyoshi Takai (honorary professor at Hokkaido University), Codenonme (Russian media professional who worked in RIA Novosti and Information Telegraph Agency of Russia), Mark Kitto (author of China Cuckoo), Stuart Ramsay (chief correspondent at Sky News), and scholars such as Zhaofeng Xue (economist), Junfeng Yang (law professional), and Junli Du (historian).

As a learning project that focuses on multi-lingual reporting, Cenci Journalism Project provides more sources of information for media professionals in China. At the same time, many journalism professors and language professors in Chinese universities also use Cenci Journalism Project for case study in class.
