= Beatrice Cenci (disambiguation) =

Beatrice Cenci (1577–1599) was a young Roman noblewoman who murdered her father.

Beatrice Cenci may also refer to:

- Beatrice Cenci (1909 film), a silent historical film directed by Mario Caserini
- Beatrice Cenci (1926 film), a silent historical film directed by Baldassarre Negroni
- Beatrice Cenci (1941 film), a historical drama film directed by Guido Brignone
- Beatrice Cenci (1956 film), a historical drama film directed by Riccardo Freda
- Beatrice Cenci (1969 film), a historical drama film directed by Lucio Fulci
- Beatrice Cenci (opera), an opera by Berthold Goldschmidt

== See also ==
- Beatrix Cenci, an opera by Alberto Ginastera
