= Censi (surname) =

Censi (pronounced [ˈtʃɛnsi]) is an Italian surname derived from Cenzo, an apheretic form of the given name Vincenzo. Notable people with the name include:

- Giannina Censi (1913–1995), Italian dancer and choreographer
- Ugo De Censi (1924–2018), Italian-Peruvian Salesian priest
- Yves Censi (born 1964), French politician

== See also ==
- Capite censi
- Cenci
- Cenzo
- DiCenzo
