= Christian Cenci =

Italian football player (born 1998)

Personal information
- Date of birth: 24 January 1998 (age 28)
- Place of birth: Rimini, Italy
- Height: 1.80 m (5 ft 11 in)
- Position: Midfielder

Team information
- Current team: Santarcangelo

Youth career
- –2015: Cesena

Senior career*
Years	Team	Apps	(Gls)
2015–2018	Cesena	0	(0)
2015–2016	→ Romagna Centro (loan)	10	(1)
2016–2017	→ San Marino (loan)	24	(2)
2017–2018	→ Ravenna (loan)	23	(0)
2018–2019	Forlì	27	(0)
2019	Tamai	6	(0)
2019–2020	Corigliano	9	(0)
2020–2021	Troina	15	(0)
2021	Paternò	6	(0)
2021	Nereto	4	(0)
2021–2022	Sancataldese	6	(0)
2022–2024	Vado	71	(5)
2024–2025	Fossano	17	(2)
2025	Sangiovannese	14	(0)
2025	NovaRomentin	13	(1)
2025–2026	Vigor Senigallia	0	(0)
2025–	Santarcangelo		
- * Club domestic league appearances and goals as of 22 February 2026

Christian Cenci (born 24 January 1998) is an Italian football player who plays for Eccellenza club Santarcangelo.

== Club career ==
He made his Serie C debut for Ravenna on 27 August 2017 in a game against Fermana.
