= Cencio II Frangipane =

Roman nobleman of the Frangipani family

Cencius II or Cencio II Frangipane was the son of either of Cencio I or of John, a brother of one Leo. He was the principal representative of the Frangipani family of Rome in the early twelfth century.

One night in 1118, he interrupted the College of Cardinals in Santa Maria in Pallara sul Palatino, near his castle, and arrested the newly elected Pope Gelasius II and some of his followers. Popular opinion turned so against him, however, that he was forced to release the pope. In that one night, however, the whole relationship between the Frangipani and the Gregorian reformers broke down. In Spring 1121, Pope Callistus II destroyed the Frangipani fortress in Rome and prohibited its reconstruction.

In 1124, in alliance with Cardinal Aimerico of Santa Maria Nova, the papal chancellor and leader of the French reform party, Cencio forced the election of Honorius II. In 1125, the pope granted him the county of Ceccano and from there he sacked the Abbey of Montecassino. In 1128, Cencio and Aimerico together travelled to the court of Count Roger II of Sicily to invest him with the Duchy of Apulia from the pope.

Cencio later fell out with Aimerico. On 14 February 1130, Aimerico's candidate, Innocent II, was elected pope, but immediately opposed by the Roman nobility, including Cencio, who sent a letter dated 18 May to Lothair of Supplinburg, King of Germany, asking him to support the antipope Anacletus II. Cencio was exiled from the city for the next three years until his return on 4 June 1133 to be present at Lothair's imperial coronation.

== Sources ==
- Caravale, Mario (ed). Dizionario Biografico degli Italiani: L Francesco I Sforza – Gabbi. Rome, 1998.
- Gregorovius, Ferdinand. Rome in the Middle Ages Vol. IV. trans. Annie Hamilton. 1905.
- Norwich, John Julius. The Normans in the South 1016-1130. Longmans: London, 1967.
