= Frangipani family =

Roman patrician family during the Middle Ages

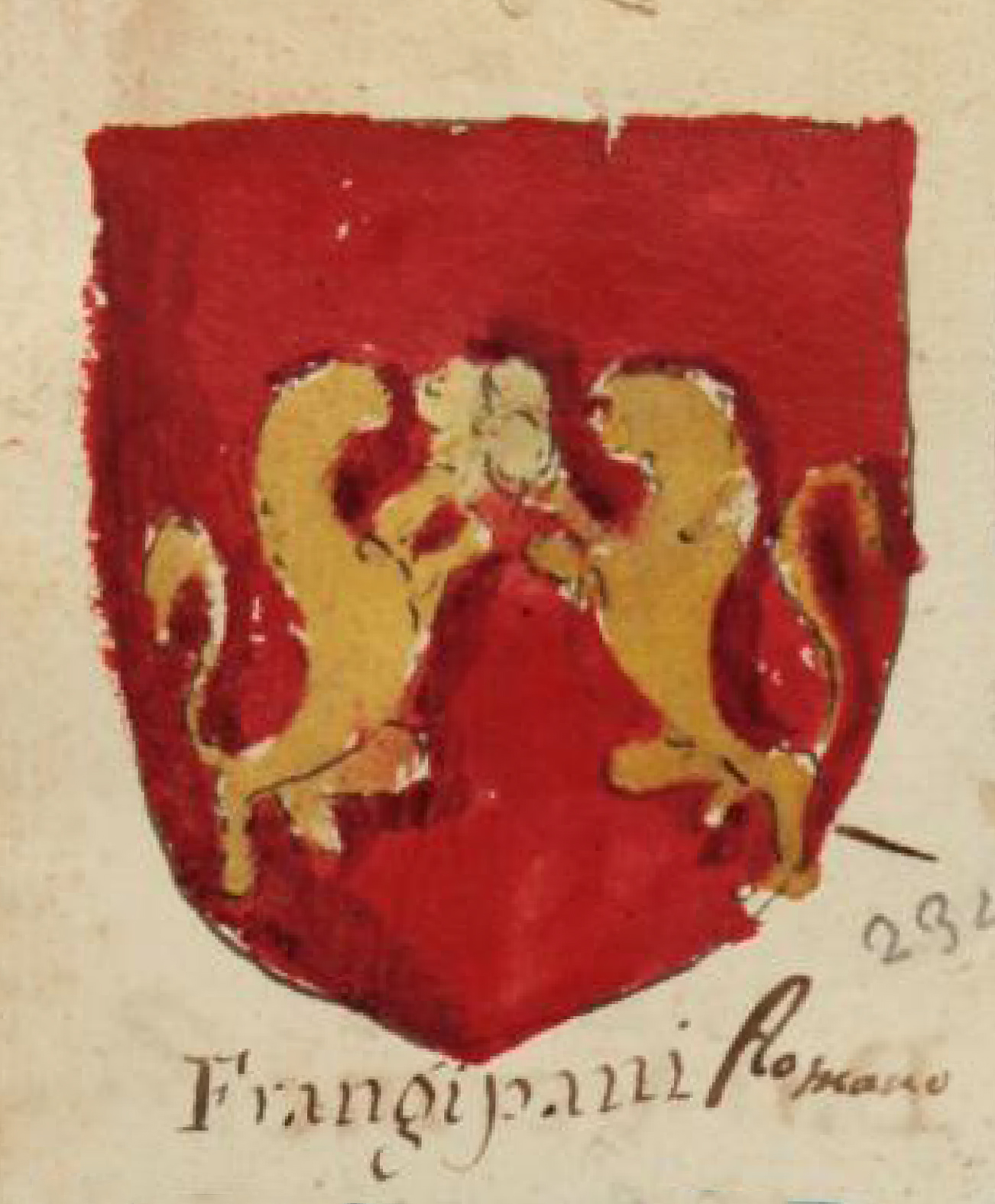
Arms of Frangipani, from a manuscript circa 1700, now in the Biblioteca Estense in Modena

The Frangipani family was a powerful Roman patrician clan in the Middle Ages. The family was firmly Guelph in sympathy. The name has many spellings, which include Frangipane, Freiapane, Fricapane and Fresapane. In his Trattatello in laude di Dante, Boccaccio traces the descent of Dante from the family.

== History ==
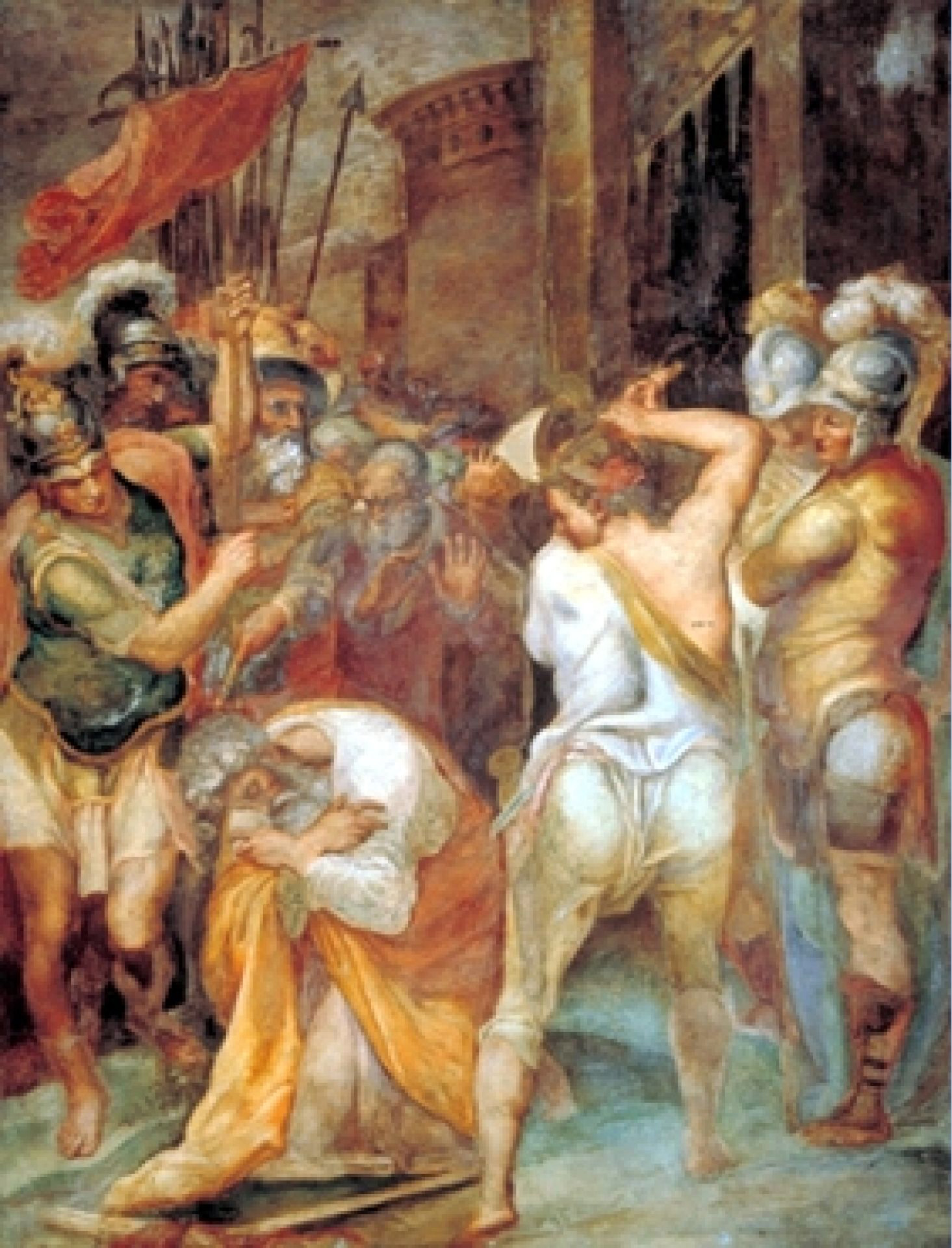
Taddeo Zuccari, Beheading of Saint Paul, 1558–1559, in the Frangipani Chapel of San Marcello al Corso in Rome

The family claimed descent from the Roman plebeian family of Anicii; however, the first mention of the family dates only from 1014, in a document relating to the Abbazia di Farfa. A parchment diploma of Otto I in the Frangipani archive at Castello di Porpetto, in Friuli, is dated 10 January 973.

They played a significant part in the struggle between Pope Gregory VII and Holy Roman Emperor Henry IV, and briefly governed Rome from 1107 to 1108. In the feud between the Orsini and Colonna families, they supported the Orsini. Their power was at its greatest when they achieved the election of Pope Honorius II in 1124. From no later than 1130 the Frangipani held the Colosseum of Rome, which they had fortified and which gave them strategic control of the approaches to the Lateran Palace, the papal residence, from the north and west; the family lost control of the Colosseum to the Annibaldi in the mid-thirteenth century.

In 1268 Giovanni Frangipane, lord of Astura, betrayed Conradin, the teenage Duke of Swabia and last of the Hohenstaufen dynasty, who took refuge with him after his defeat at the Battle of Tagliacozzo. Frangipane arrested him and handed him over to Charles of Anjou, who beheaded him.

The family had feuds in the Campagna south of Rome, among them Astura, Cisterna, Marino, Ninfa and Terracina, and later Nemi.

The Roman branch of the family was extinguished in 1654 with the death of Mario Frangipane, marquis of Nemi. Two presumed branches continued, one in Friuli and one in Dalmatia. The former had estates at Tarcento and Porpetto, and received patrician status in Rome. The latter descended from the lords of the island of Veglia (now Krk in Croatia), who in the fifteenth century claimed to be related to the Roman family, took the name Frangipani (Frankopan or Frankapan) on the basis of documents provided by Pope Martin V, and from about 1530 used the Frangipane coat of arms; Croatian historians dispute the historicity of this connection.

The Frangipani had the right of burial at the church of San Marcello al Corso in Rome; their chapel – the Frangipani Chapel – in that church is dedicated to Saint Paul. From 1558 or 1559 until his death in 1566, Taddeo Zuccari worked there on a cycle of frescoes of the life of the saint; the paintings were completed by his brother Federico.

== Members of the family ==
- Cencio I Frangipane
- Cencio II Frangipane
- Oddone Frangipane
- Ottone Frangipane; monk, later canonised.
- Aldruda Frangipane
