= Cencio I Frangipane =

Roman nobleman of the Frangipani family

Cencio I Frangipane (also Cencius or Centius) was a Roman nobleman of the Frangipani family of the latter half of the eleventh century. He was a Roman consul.

His parentage is cited first in 1066, when he appeared as Cencio vir magnificus filio quondam Johannes de Imperator. His father was Giovanni Sardo de Imperator. In 1039, three siblings, Leo, Bernard, and Bona made a donation to Santa Maria Novella as filii quondam Petri Frajapane de Imperator. Peter was the first known member of the family and he clearly carried two surnames. Leo, his son, had two sons, Robert and John, the latter being the father of Cencius. John and Robert were only known by their Imperator name, though Cencius used Frangipane.

Cencius began his career as a follower of the Gregorian reform. His seal appears on a document of Pope Nicholas II investing Abbot Bernard of Farfa with the castles of Tribuco and Arce. The militantly imperialist Benzone, Bishop of Alba, recorded in his Ad Heinricum imperatorem libri VII that Cencius worked to influence the election of Alexander II in 1061. However, despite all this, on 25 December 1075, Pope Gregory VII was kidnapped and imprisoned by Cencius while he was officiating in Santa Maria Maggiore. The pope was liberated by the people, but he accused the Emperor Henry IV of being behind the attempt. The event is often cited as the beginning of Investiture Controversy.

In the 1080s, the Chronica of Monte Cassino referred to Cencius as consul Romanorum or "consul of the Romans." In 1084, when Henry besieged the Eternal City, Cencius sustained Gregory in the Leonine City and negotiated with the Normans of Robert Guiscard, allowing the sack of the city as a reward for rescuing it from Henry, but preserving the pope's liberty and the papal city.

In the election of 1085, Cencius advanced Odo of Lagery, the cardinal-bishop of Ostia and future Pope Urban II, as a candidate. However, the electors selected Desiderius of Benevento as Victor III. Cencius and Victor had strained relations, but he participated in the Council of Capua, at which Victor was confirmed as pope, in March 1087 with the Normans.

Cencius was last mentioned in November 1102 assisting Matilda of Canossa with the distribution of her property.

== Sources ==
- Caravale, Mario (ed). Dizionario Biografico degli Italiani: L Francesco I Sforza – Gabbi. Rome, 1998.
- Gregorovius, Ferdinand. Rome in the Middle Ages Vol. II. trans. Annie Hamilton. 1905.
