= Saint Sebastian (Preti) =

Painting by Mattia Preti

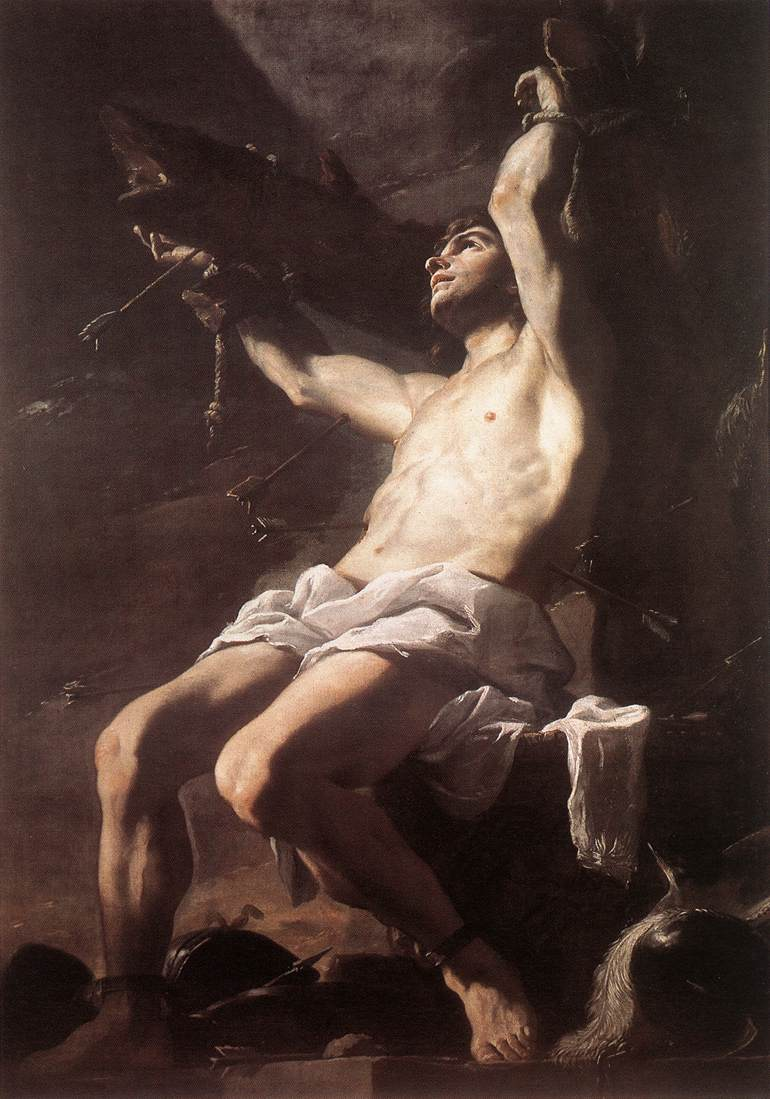
- Artist: Mattia Preti
- Year: c. 1657
- Medium: Oil on canvas
- Dimensions: 240 cm × 169 cm (94 in × 67 in)
- Location: National Museum of Capodimonte; Naples

Saint Sebastian is an oil on canvas painting by Italian artist Mattia Preti, created c. 1657. It represents Saint Sebastian, and is held in the National Museum of Capodimonte, in Naples.

== History ==
The painting was made on behalf of the nuns of the San Sebastiano, Naples in Naples, during Preti first stay at the city. Following criticism and pressure from the artists of the Neapolitan environment, above all Luca Giordano, who considered the representation of the saint devoid of the nobility and beauty that distinguishes him in classical iconography, the work was removed from the chapel where it was located.

Embittered by the incident, Preti handed his canvas to a nobleman who placed it in the family's private chapel, inside the church, today Basilica, of Santa Maria dei Sette Dolori, in Naples, where it remained on view until 1974 (the nobleman affirmed that the painting could thus be "the school of young people who want to profit from a perfect drawing, and an excellent natural."). The same year the work was transferred, for security reasons, to the National Museum of Capodimonte.

== Description ==
The scene, which has a clear Caravaggesque influence, depicts the saint tied to a pole and pierced by arrows, following the death sentence inflicted on him as a Christian by emperor Diocletian. The pose of Saint Sebastian emphasizes the Pretian style of the figures taken foreshortened, in transversal projection, to give more momentum and depth to the composition, elements already adopted in previous works such as his San Nicola di Bari or his San Giovanni Battista, but here they find the apex of realization for their quality and style. Unlike the two paintings of San Domenico Soriano, where the first sees a luministic effect dominated by the yellow color scheme, and the second by a red one, in this work, which is chronologically slightly later, there is a prevalence of the silvery gray hue, a detail also found in the immediately following works to this, like the Return of the Prodigal Son, in the version of the Royal Palace of Naples, and which more generally will accompany the whole mature phase of the Calabrian painter.

Roberto Longhi in 1913 defined the work as a "masterpiece of an isolated figure", highlighting precisely the particular construction of the scene: "(...) I do not know a single figure where the construction created by the seventeenth century is expressed with greater clarity and success ".
