= Saint John the Baptist Wearing the Red Tabard of the Order of Saint John =

Painting by Mattia Preti

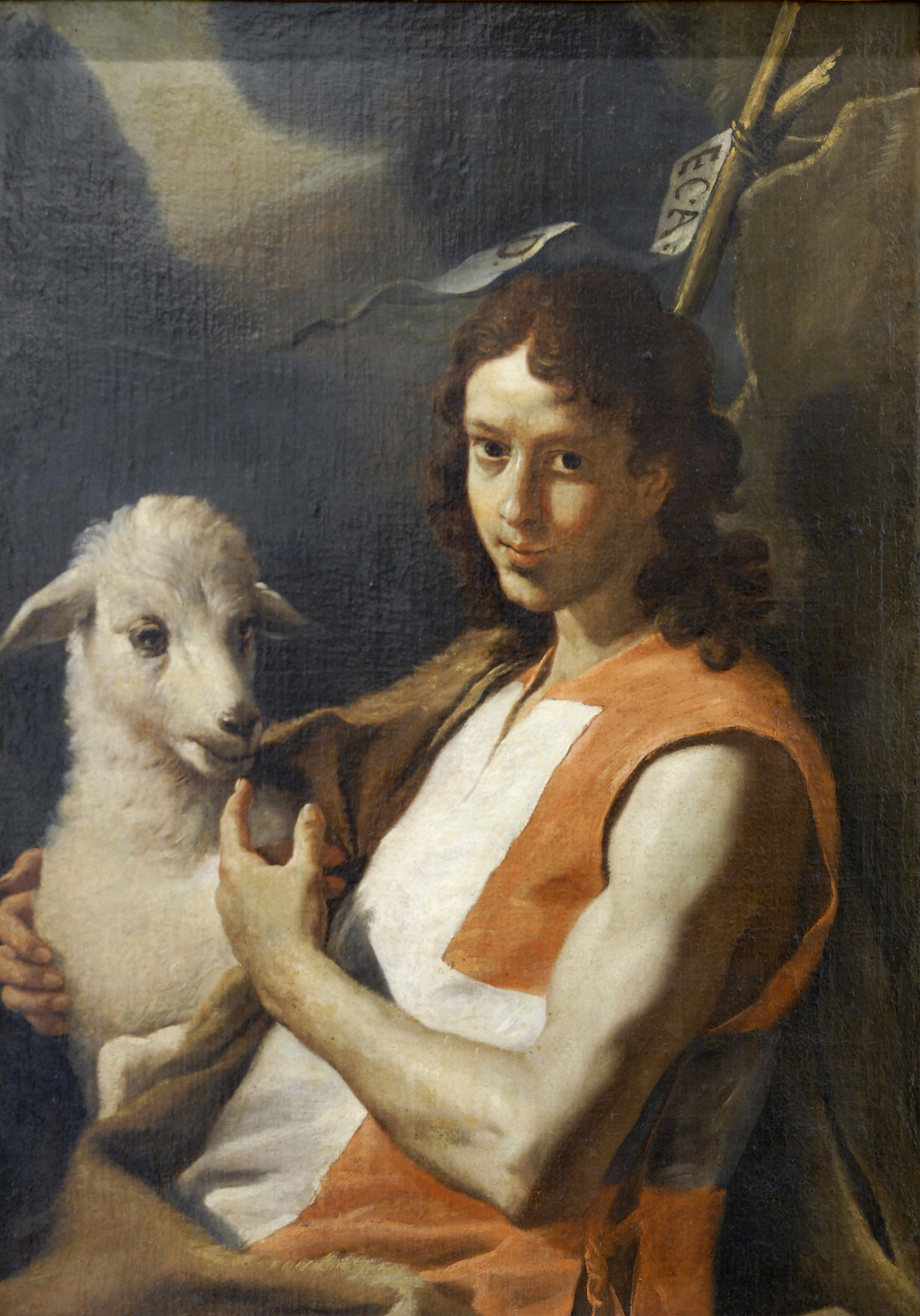
- Artist: Mattia Preti
- Year: 1671
- Medium: oil on canvas
- Dimensions: 98 cm × 78 cm (39 in × 31 in)
- Location: MUŻA; Valletta, Malta

Saint John the Baptist Wearing the Red Tabard of the Order of Saint John is an oil painting on canvas by the Italian painter Mattia Preti, from 1671. The painting has the dimensions of 98 × 78 centimeters. It is in the collection of MUŻA in Valletta, Malta.

== Analysis ==
The painting is believed to be a self-portrait of the artist, Mattia Preti, wearing the red tabard of the Order of Saint John.

== Sources ==
- Keith Sciberras (2012). Mattia Preti: The Triumphant Manner, with a Catalogue of His Works in Malta. Photographs Joe P. Borg. Midsea Books. ISBN 9789993274070.
