= Saint Anthony Abbot (Preti) =

Painting by Mattia Preti

Sant'Antonio Abate (St Anthony Abbot)
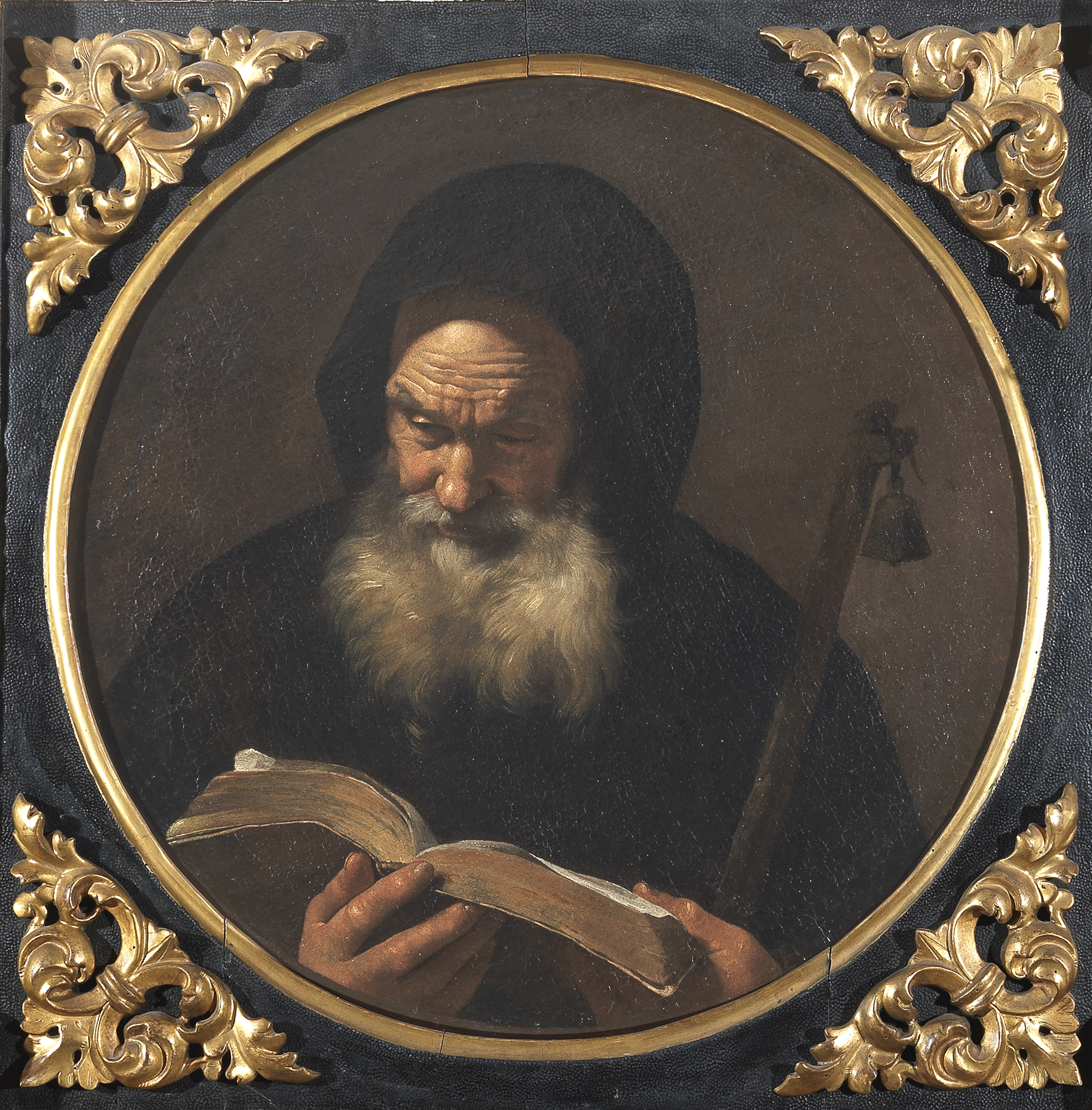
- Artist: Mattia Preti
- Year: circa 1628
- Medium: Oil on canvas
- Dimensions: 62 cm × 62 cm (24 in × 24 in)
- Location: Collezione M; Rome

Sant'Antonio Abate is an oil-on-canvas painting by the Italian Baroque painter Mattia Preti, executed c. 1628. It is part of the Collezione M curated by the Fondazione Sorgente Group in Rome, Italy.

== Description ==
The oval painting depicts a half-bust of the eremitic early Christian monk St Anthony Abbot. He is reading a book, and on his shoulder leans his staff with a bell. The elderly man is dressed in a sober dark cloak with hood, setting apart his white beard. The painting has also been described as possibly depicting St Francis of Paola. The dark chiaroscuro betrays the influence of Caravaggio and his followers.
