= Mattia Preti =

Italian painter (1613–1699)

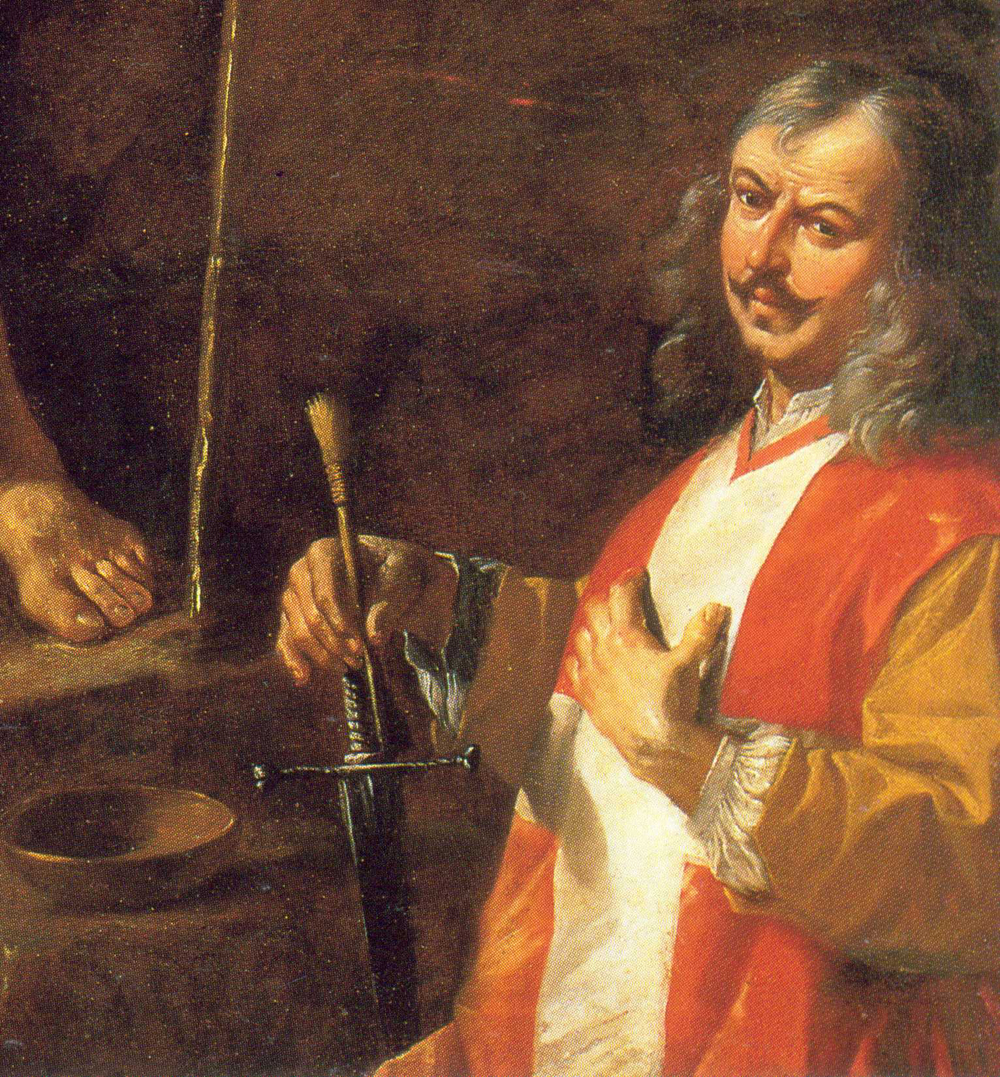
- Self-portrait. Detail from the painting Predica di San Giovanni Battista, c. 1672, Taverna, Church of San Domenico
- Born: 24 February 1613; Taverna, Calabria, Kingdom of Naples
- Died: 3 January 1699 (aged 85); Valletta, Hospitaller Malta
- Other name: Il Cavalier Calabrese
- Notable work: Aeneas Fleeing Troy (c. 1640); Vanitas (c. 1650); Judith and Holofernes (c. 1653); The Return of the Prodigal Son (c. 1658); The Death of Sophonisba (c. 1670)
- Style: Baroque painting

Mattia Preti (24 February 1613 – 3 January 1699) was an Italian Baroque artist who worked in Italy and Malta. Born in the small town of Taverna in Calabria, Preti was called Il Cavalier Calabrese (the Calabrian Knight) after appointment as a Knight of the Order of St. John (Knights of Malta) in 1660.

== Life ==
=== Early life and education ===
Mattia Preti was born in Taverna, a small town in Calabria, southern Italy, the third child in a large local middle-class family. He was baptised the day after his birth, on 26 February 1613, in the parish church of the Borgo San Martino district. The ceremony took place in the private family chapel belonging to his mother, Innocenza Schipani, who came from one of Taverna's fourteen noble families.

Preti grew up in an artistic environment that was on the fringes of the most vibrant cultural scenes of his time. In his native Calabria, art was still deeply rooted in the tradition of late Neapolitan Mannerism, as exemplified by painters such as Giovanni Balducci, Giovanni Bernardino Azzolini, and Fabrizio Santafede. From an early age, Preti was entrusted to the care of Don Marcello Anania, the parish priest of Santa Barbara in Taverna, who taught him grammar and the humanities. It was Anania who facilitated Preti's initial contacts with Roman cultural circles.

=== Rome, 1630–1653 ===
In 1630, Mattia Preti moved to Rome, where he lived with his older brother Gregorio, who was also a painter and was about ten years his senior. Gregorio had arrived in the Papal capital two years earlier, in 1628. In Rome, Mattia became acquainted with the techniques of Caravaggio and his followers, such as Bartolomeo Manfredi, Nicolas Tournier and Valentin de Boulogne, who exherted a strong influence on his art. Preti’s early works were greatly influenced by Caravaggio. He used sharp, dramatic contrasts between deep shadow and intense light and frequently depicted everyday subjects, such as card players, musicians and tavern scenes.

By 1636, Mattia and Gregorio Preti were recorded as residing at the Church of San Biagio a Montecitorio. Their names had already appeared on lists of artists associated with the Accademia di San Luca, although they did not formally join the institution. By the early 1640s, the brothers were enjoying considerable success in Roman circles. Numerous works by Mattia were catalogued in important private collections belonging to the local nobility, alongside significant public commissions.

Works dating from this period include canvases depicting The Flagellation of Saint John Calybites, executed by Preti in collaboration with Gregorio. Preti also created paintings for lay patrons featuring scenes of musicians and gamblers, as well as episodes from the Gospels.

On 31 October 1642 Preti was admitted to the Order of St John of Jerusalem. Dating from this period is the large canvas depicting Empress Faustina visiting Saint Catherine of Alexandria in prison (Dayton Art Institute, Dayton, Ohio). Its original frame bore the Barberini coat of arms, and the work was most likely created to celebrate his knighthood.

Between 1644 and 1646, Preti may have spent time in Venice, but remained based in Rome until 1653, returning later in 1660–61. Preti's interest in the Neo-Venetian style is evident in a series of mythological paintings he created for the Pallavicini Gallery in Rome, most notably The Rape of Europa, which demonstrates Preti's affinity with Guercino's pictorial style.

Although Preti remained in Rome for nearly twenty-five years, he travelled frequently throughout Italy and abroad during this period, particularly to Spain and the Flanders. He established contacts with Emilian painters of the preceding generation, such as Guercino and Giovanni Lanfranco, who further influenced his painting style.

=== Major Roman commissions, 1646–1651 ===
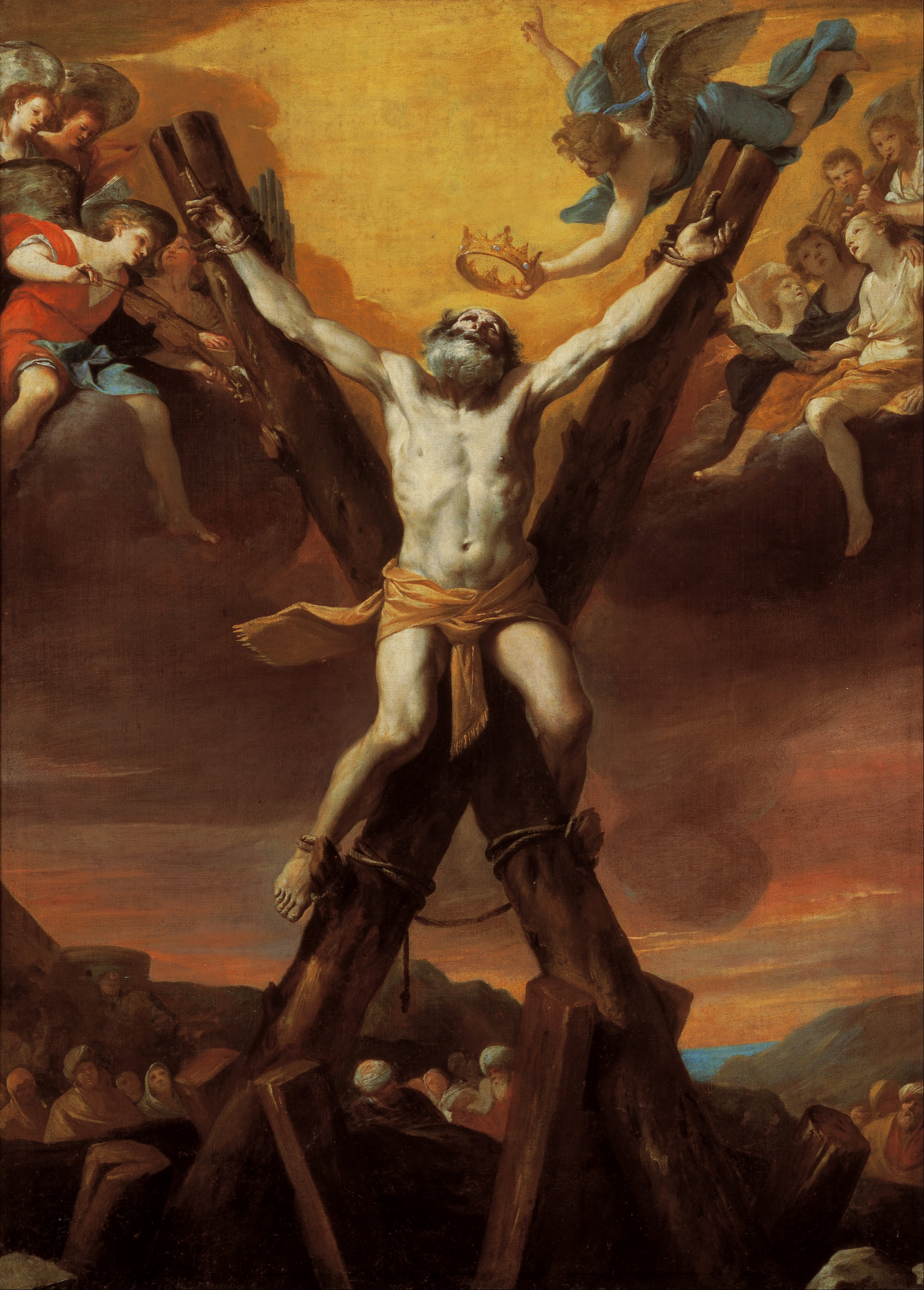
The crucifixion of St Andrew, c. 1651, Art Gallery of South Australia, Adelaide

From Easter 1646 until 1651, Preti is recorded as living fairly steadily in Rome, specifically in a house near Piazza di Spagna alongside Bartolomeo Dardovini, who would later become one of his collaborators. He resumed working for the Roman nobility, creating pieces that were included in the most illustrious art collections in the city, such as those of the Sacchetti and the Pamphilj. Notable works include The Concert, The Tribute Money and Hagar in the Desert. He also worked on public commissions, most notably the frescoes in the apse of the Basilica of Sant'Andrea della Valle, which depict scenes from the martyrdom of Saint Andrew. He also painted the abbey's processional banner and murals for the Abbey of San Martino al Cimino in Viterbo.

The projects for Sant'Andrea della Valle are among the most significant commissions in Baroque Rome from that period. In 1650, Cardinal Francesco Peretti di Montalto commissioned the artist to paint frescoes depicting the life of Saint Andrew on the nave's vault. However, due to the time required for completion, the scaffolding could not be dismantled in time for the Jubilee, so the commission was relocated to the apse walls, where it would be less obtrusive. The number of scenes to be depicted was reduced to three: the Martyrdom, the Crucifixion, and the Burial of the Saint.

=== Modena, 1651–1652 ===
On 4 October 1651, Mattia Preti was summoned to the court of Modena by Francesco I d'Este to carry out commissioned works. Preti painted The Assumption of the Virgin for the Chapel of Relics in the city's cathedral, as well as a cycle of frescoes for the Church of the Carmine (now San Biagio).

For San Biagio, Preti frescoed the dome, pendentives, choir vault and apse conch. He relied heavily on workshop assistants to depict an Orchestra of Musical Angels in the apse. By contrast, the dome is attributed to Preti himself and features the Glory of Paradise, a scene that is typical of Lanfranco’s decorative style. Preti successfully rendered the scene with swirling clouds and figures arranged in perfect perspective, receding in a concentric composition across the dome's surface. By January 1652, Preti's work in Modena was complete, and the final instalments of the agreed 2,000-ducat fee were paid after he had returned to Rome.

=== Rome, 1652–1653 ===
Upon his return to Rome, Mattia Preti and his brother Gregorio were commissioned to paint two frescoes depicting the life of Saint Charles Borromeo on the counter-façade of the church of San Carlo ai Catinari. These would prove to be their final public commissions in Rome. Flanking the church's entrance, Mattia painted the scene of the saint bestowing alms on the left, while Gregorio painted the scene of the saint receiving the Barnabite missionaries on the right.

In early 1653, Mattia Preti was still recorded in Rome, where he was a candidate for the position of Principe (President) of the Accademia di San Luca, although he was not ultimately appointed. A few months later, he departed for Naples.

=== Naples, 1653–1661 ===
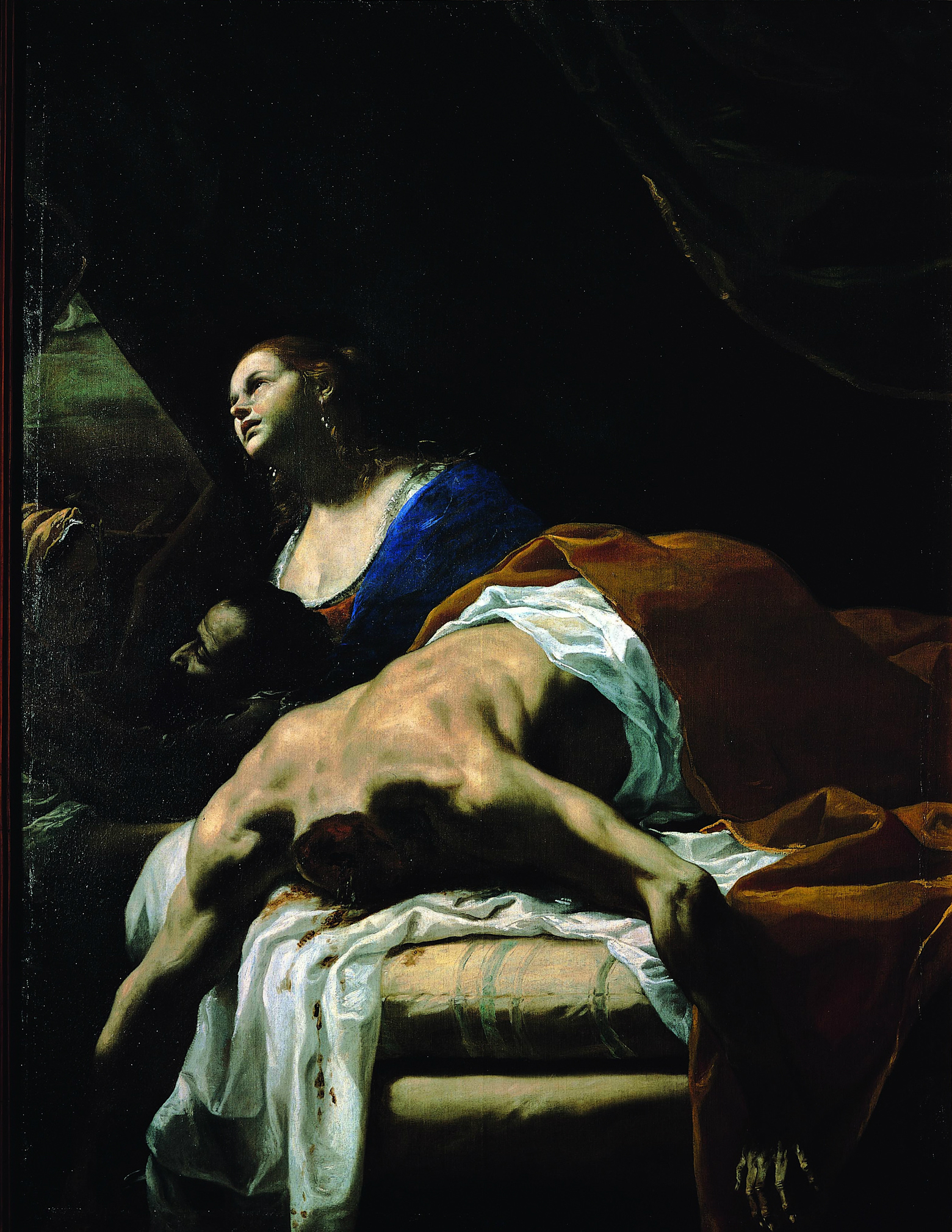
Judith and Holofernes, c. 1653-1654, 186 x 143 cm, Museo di Capodimonte, Naples

Mattia Preti first appears in the records in Naples in March 1653. He quickly became a prominent figure in Neapolitan artistic circles, developing a mutually influential relationship with the younger Luca Giordano. Together, they contributed to the development of the Neapolitan school of painting in the second half of the century. For the young Neapolitan artist, Preti acted as a bridge between the early naturalism that characterised the first half of the century and the fully-fledged Baroque style that defined the second.

Upon his arrival in Naples, Preti secured several prestigious and high-profile commissions. The first of these came from the city's Calabrian community. In 1653, he painted scenes from the life of Saint Nicholas for the church of San Domenico Soriano, the spiritual centre of the Calabrian community in Naples. These included scenes from the saint's life on the vault and dome, as well as a large canvas depicting Saint Nicholas (Naples Museo di Capodimonte).

Dating to the period between 1653 and 1656 are Judith and Holofernes and Saint John the Baptist, commissioned by the Calabrian jurist Domenico di Somma. Di Somma had served as Preti's legal counsel during a dispute with the Fathers of Sant'Andrea della Valle in Rome. Upon his death in 1659, he bequeathed the paintings to his associate, Antonino Laratta. The paintings subsequently ended up in the Neapolitan church of San Domenico, where they remained until 1806, before eventually entering the Capodimonte collections.

While the early phase of Preti's artistic career showed his familiarity with the works of Caravaggio and Battistello Caracciolo, his mature period revealed his complete assimilation of the painting style of Jusepe de Ribera, the dominant figure of mid-17th-century Neapolitan painting.

The plague that struck Naples in 1656 decimated the local population, reducing it from 450,000 to just under 200,000 inhabitants. Following this tragic event, numerous public works were commissioned in gratitude to the Virgin Mary and Naples' patron saints for saving the city. Preti's major works from this period include a series of large fresco ex-votos depicting the Virgin or saints delivering people from the plague, which were painted on seven city gates and are now lost – two sketches for them are in the Capodimonte Museum in Naples, including a bozzetto of the Virgin with the baby Jesus looming over the dying and their burial parties which envisions a Last Judgement presided over by a woman. Preti also won a commission to supervise the construction, carving, and gilding for the nave and transept of the church of San Pietro a Majella, Naples.

=== Back in Rome, 1660–1661 ===
The Incredulity of Saint Thomas, c. 1660, Kunsthistorisches Museum, Vienna

By around 1660, Preti was no longer based permanently in Naples. Archival documents and various payment records suggest that he was initially in Rome, where he succeeded Pier Francesco Mola to complete the fresco cycle depicting the Elements of the Air at the Villa Pamphilij in Valmontone. He also made improvements to his Stories of the Saint at Sant'Andrea della Valle, which he had painted during his earlier years in Rome.

Meanwhile, in Naples, Preti had established a strong professional relationship with Don Antonio Ruffo, a wealthy Sicilian patron who invited him to fresco Messina Cathedral.

=== Malta, 1661–1699 ===
During his early years in Naples, Preti developed a close relationship with the Order of the Knights of Malta, who were highly active in the city as many of their members were Spanish. Records indicate that he received fifty ducats in 1658 for a painting of Saint Francis Xavier intended for the Chapel of Aragon in St John's Co-Cathedral in Valletta. The large canvas Saint George Slaying the Dragon, also created for the same church, dates to the same year. In the summer of 1659, Preti travelled to Malta, where he was made a Knight of Grace in the Order of St John and visited the Order's headquarters.

Preti's application for the rank of Knight of Grace was accepted by the reigning Pope, Alexander VII, and his admission was recorded by the Chancery of the Order of Malta on 15 September 1660. That same year, he was commissioned to decorate the vault of St. John's Co-Cathedral in Valletta. Preti transformed the interior the cathedral with a huge series of paintings on the life and martyrdom of St. John the Baptist (1661–1666). In Malta he realized several painting for private patrons and parish churches. His increased reputation led to an expanded circle of patrons, and he received commissions from all over Europe.

Major works realized by Preti in Malta include the Conversion of Saint Paul in St Paul's Cathedral in Mdina, which was commissioned by the Knights Hospitaller, and the Madonna and Child with Saints John the Baptist and Anthony Abbot in the chapel of Verdala Palace in Siġġiewi. Other notable works include the Virgin with Saints Peter, Nicholas, and Raphael the Archangel in Lija and the Assumption of the Virgin (1668–1669) in Luqa.

Despite his intense activity on the island, the painter continued to send canvases elsewhere, including works offered for sale to his old patron Antonio Ruffo. These included Pilate Washing His Hands (1663), which is now at the Metropolitan Museum in New York and which the artist himself considered to be one of his best works. Other commissions included two canvases for Sambughè, near Treviso: Christ Before Herod and The Raising of the Cross (both 1667), executed for a merchant with trade ties to Naples. From 1672 onwards, Preti produced numerous works destined for the churches of his hometown, Taverna. Among these is one of his final masterpieces, The Preaching of the Baptist, in which the Calabrian painter’s self-portrait appears in the bottom right corner. He is depicted with a paintbrush and a sword, wearing a red tunic bearing the white eight-pointed star that identifies the Order of Malta.

Preti had a long career with a considerable artistic output. His paintings, representative of the late Baroque style, are held by many great museums, including important collections in Naples, Malta, Rome, Düsseldorf, Paris and Haarlem.

== Legacy ==
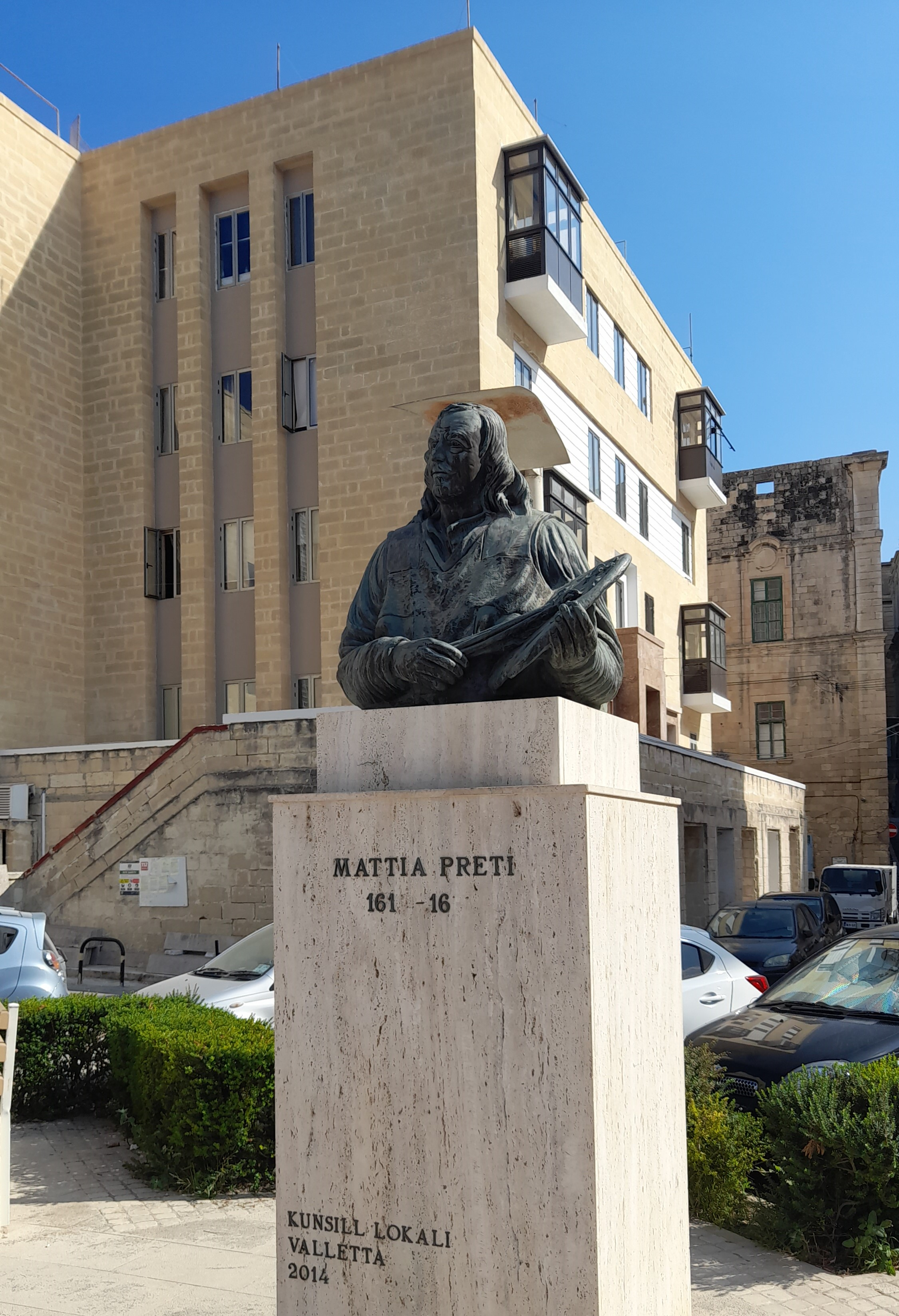
Bust of Preti, Valletta

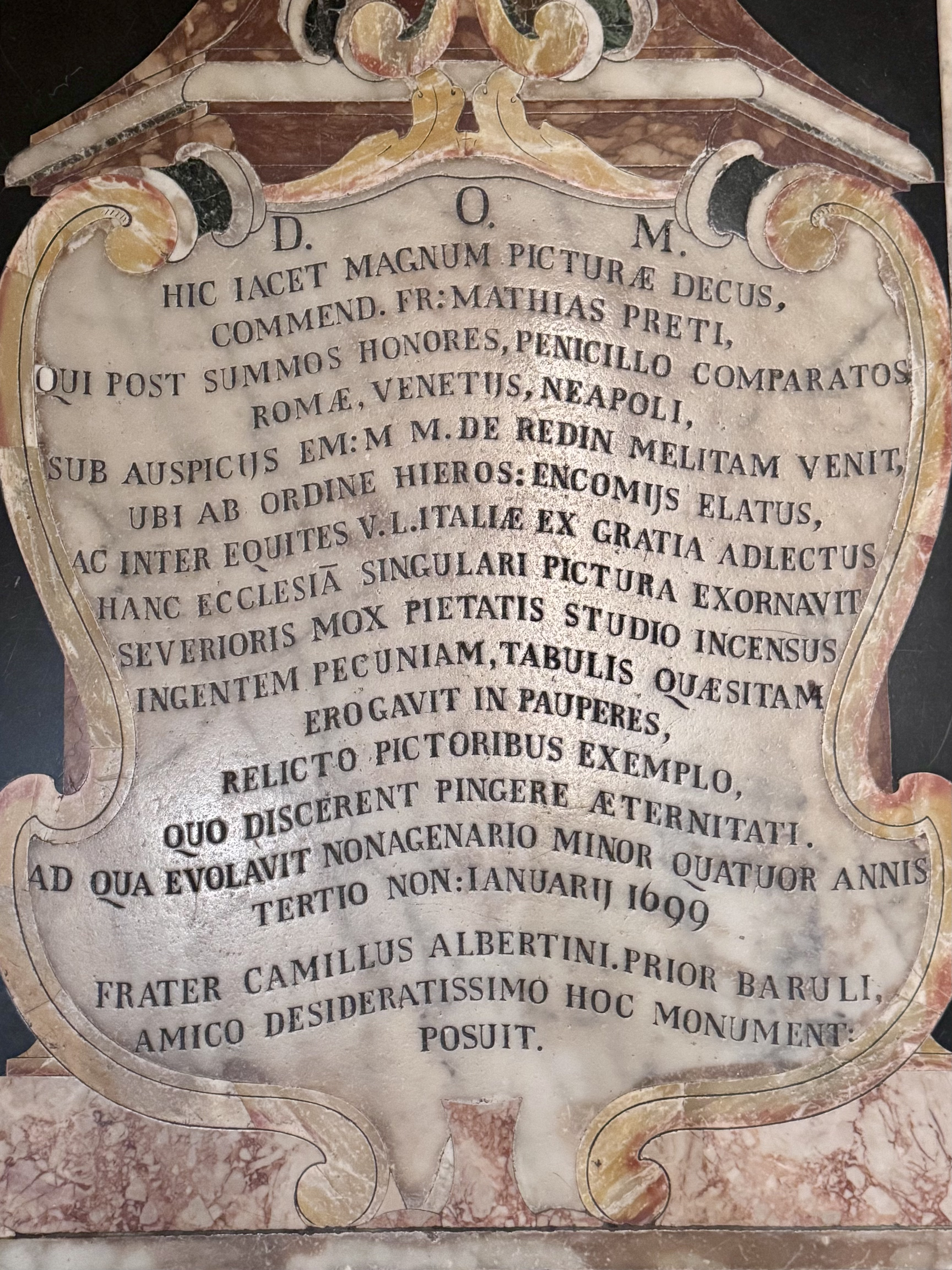
Ledger stone in St. John's Co-Cathedral, Valletta

Preti had a substantial group of collaborators, followers, disciples, pupils, and assistants who trained in his workshop. Among the most notable are the siblings Francesco, Raimondo, and Maria de Dominici; Bernardo de' Dominici, son of Raimondo and a prominent genre painter and art historian; the Spanish painter Pedro Núñez de Villavicencio; and the Sicilian painter Antonio Madiona. He exerted a considerable influence on later Neapolitan painters, including Luca Giordano and Francesco Solimena.

According to Paolo Damiano Franzese, Preti's painting, grounded in dignity, a measured idea of the natural, and the educational function of art, shows a cultural and philosophical affinity with the ideal of the "architectonic" poet theorised by Tommaso Campanella in his Poetics.

In the Manderaggio area of Valletta, there is a town square named after him, Mattia Preti Square (Maltese: Misraħ Mattia Preti). In this square there is also a commemorative bust of him, which was unveiled by the Local Council of Valletta in 2014. He is buried at St. John's Co-Cathedral in Valletta alongside many other Knight of the Order.

== Gallery ==
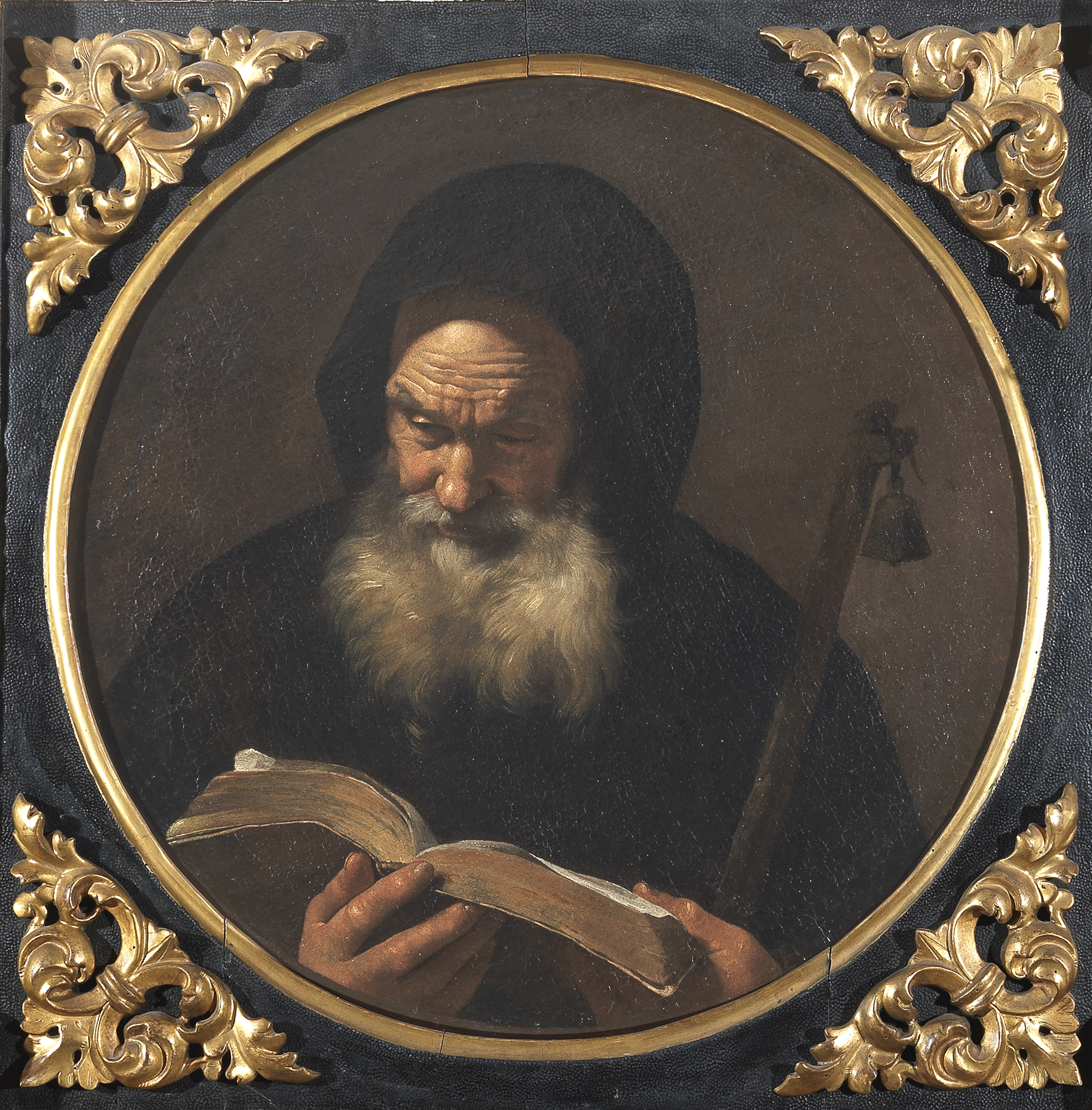
Sant'Antonio Abate, c. 1628, 62 x 62 cm, private collection

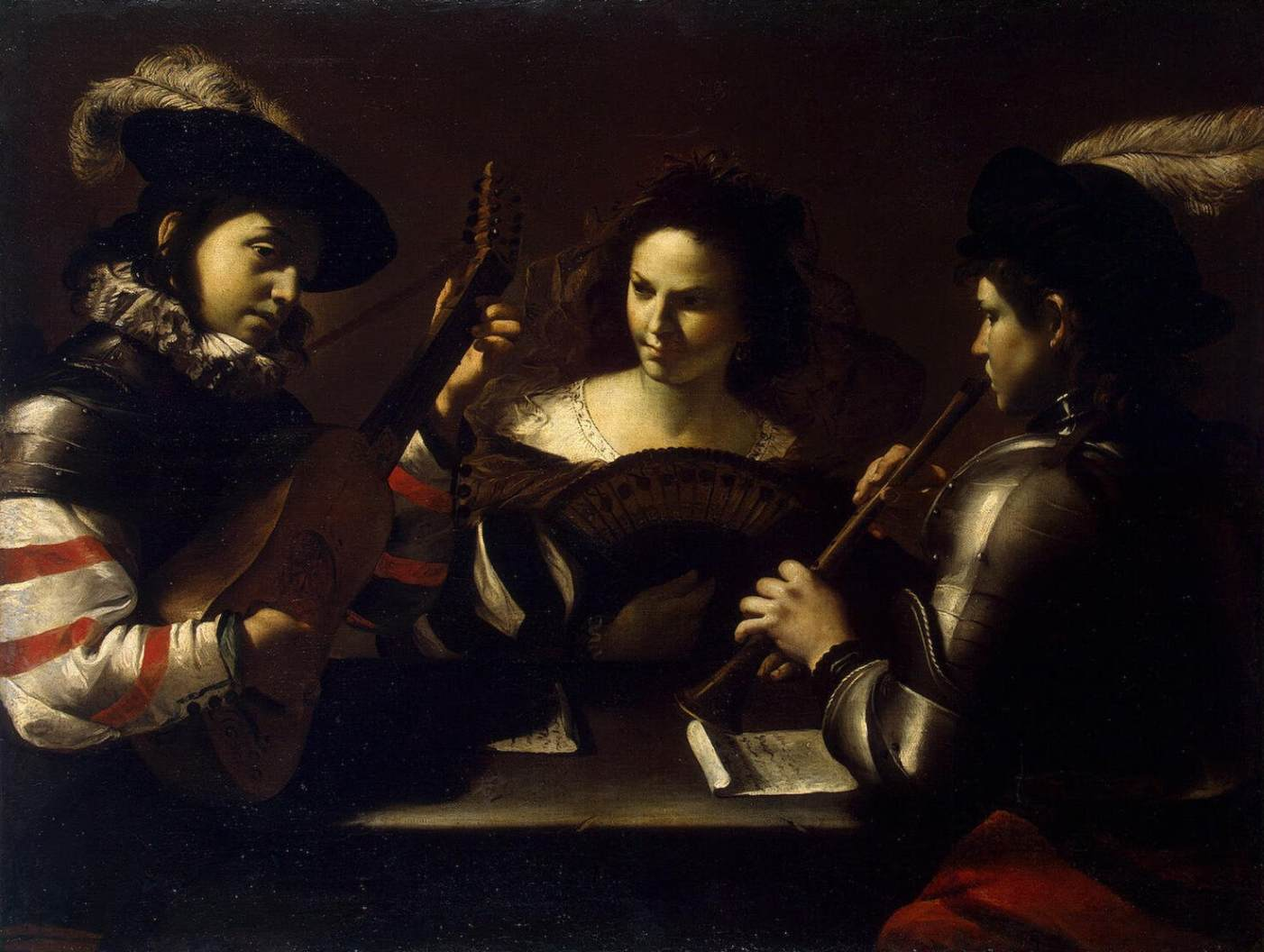
The Concert, c. 1630, Hermitage Museum, Saint Petersburg

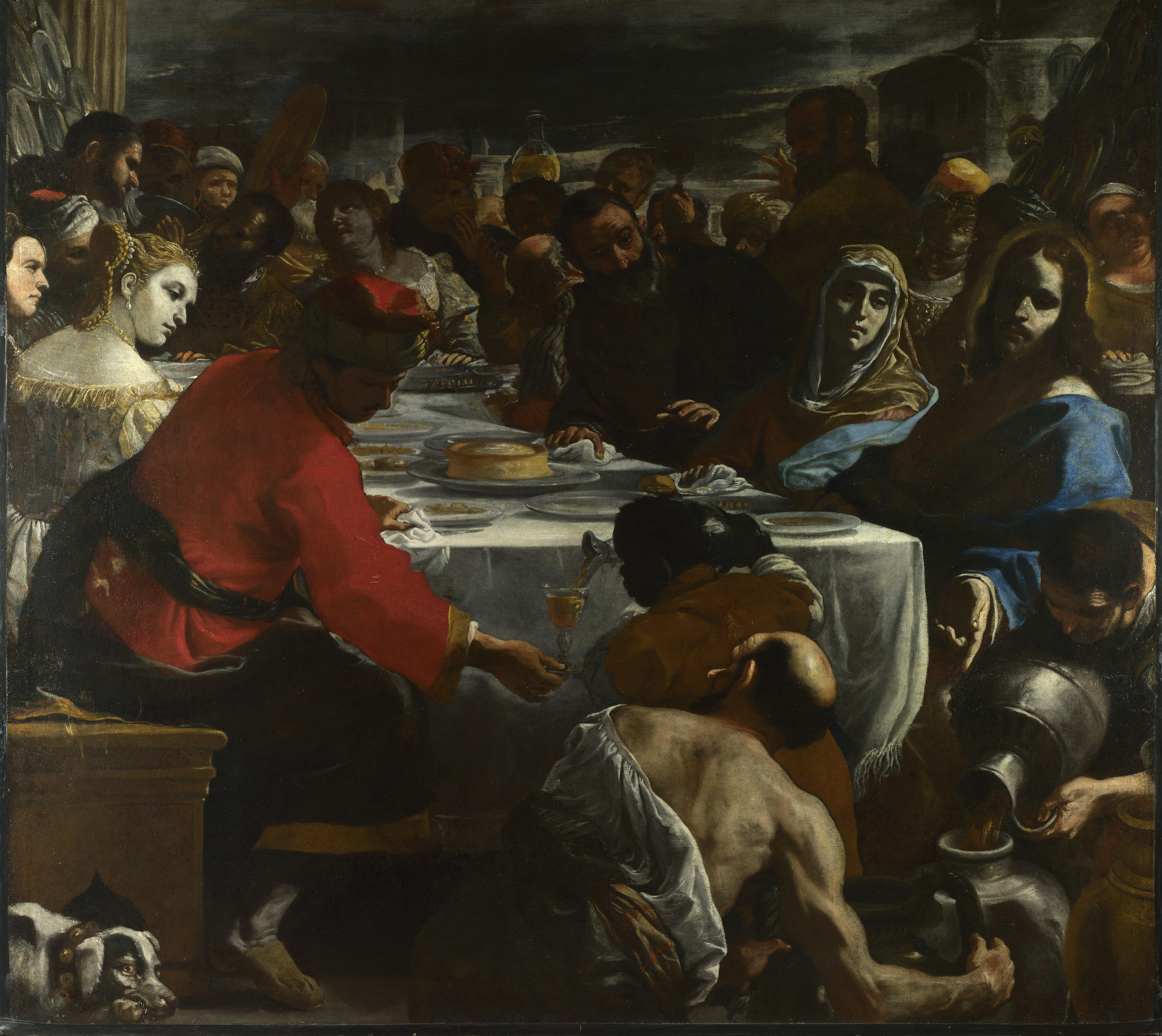
The Marriage at Cana, c. 1655-1660, National Gallery, London

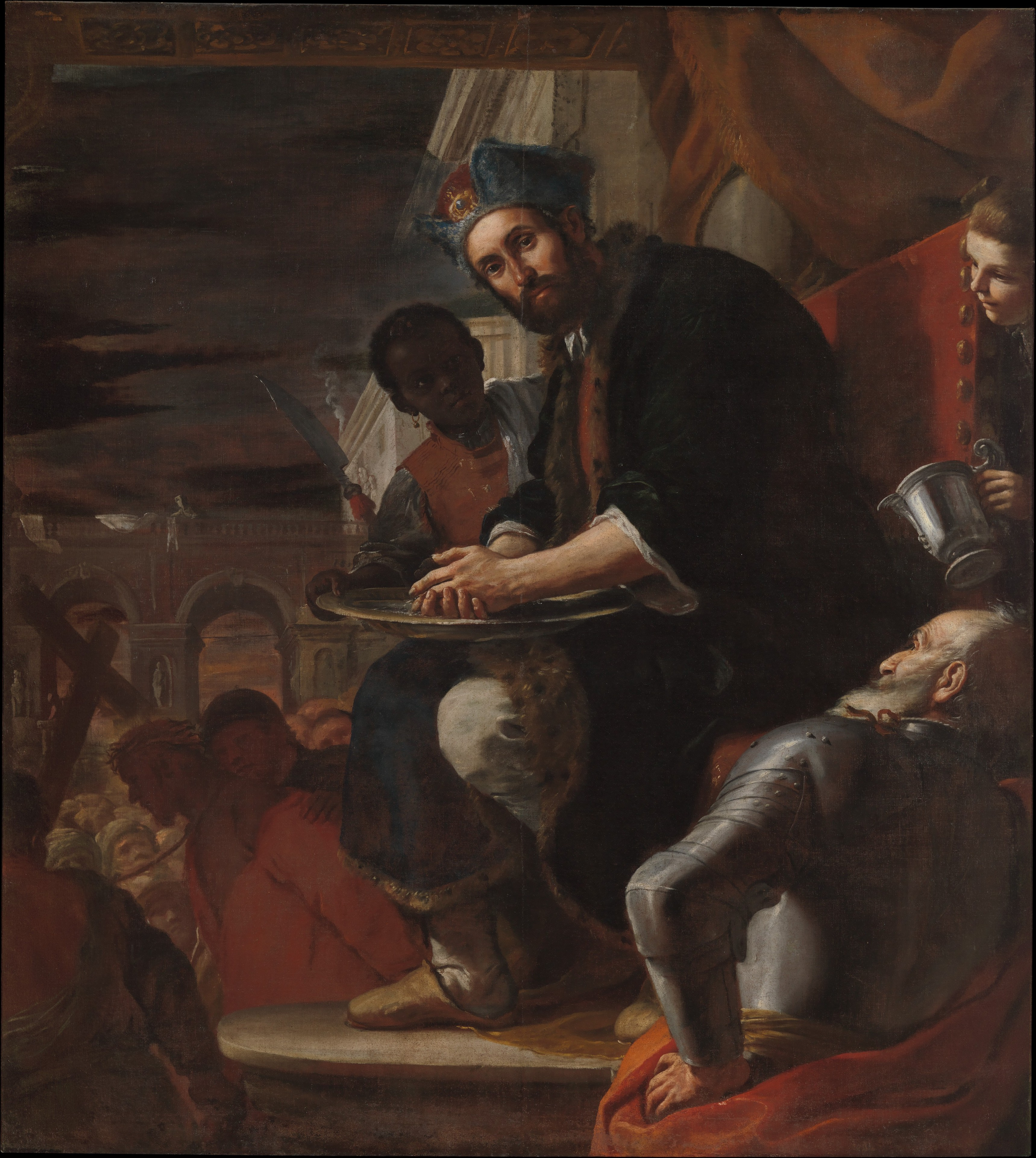
Pilate Washing His Hands, c. 1663, The Metropolitan Museum of Art, New York

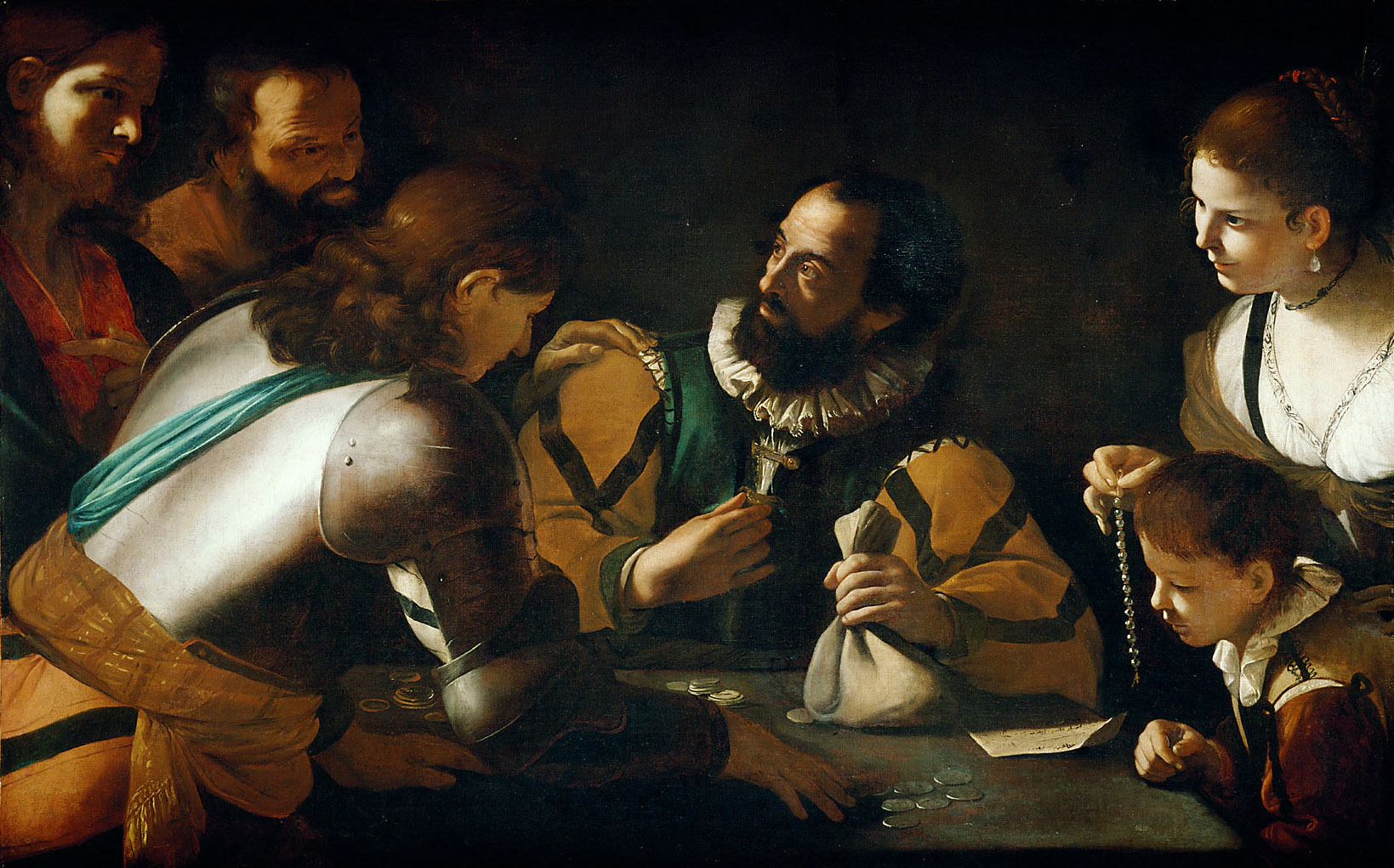
Calling the Apostle Matthew, c. 1630-1640, 104 x 164 cm, Kunsthistorisches Museum, Vienna

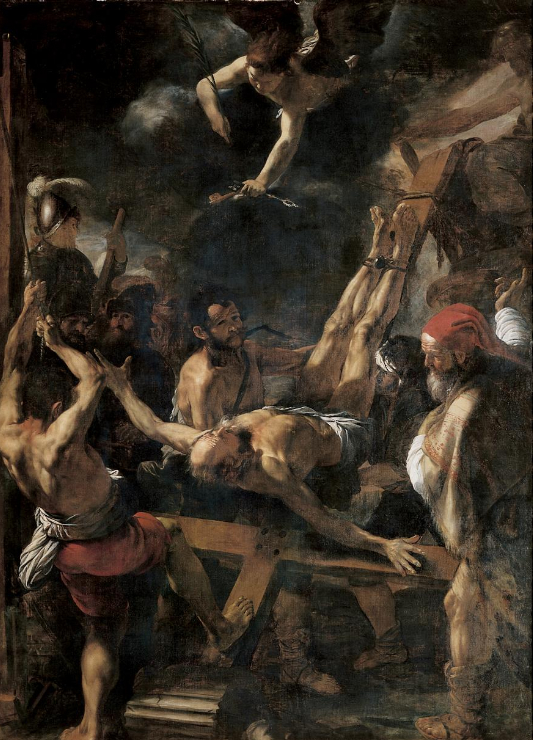
The Martyrdom of Saint Peter, c. 1630-1650, Museum of Grenoble

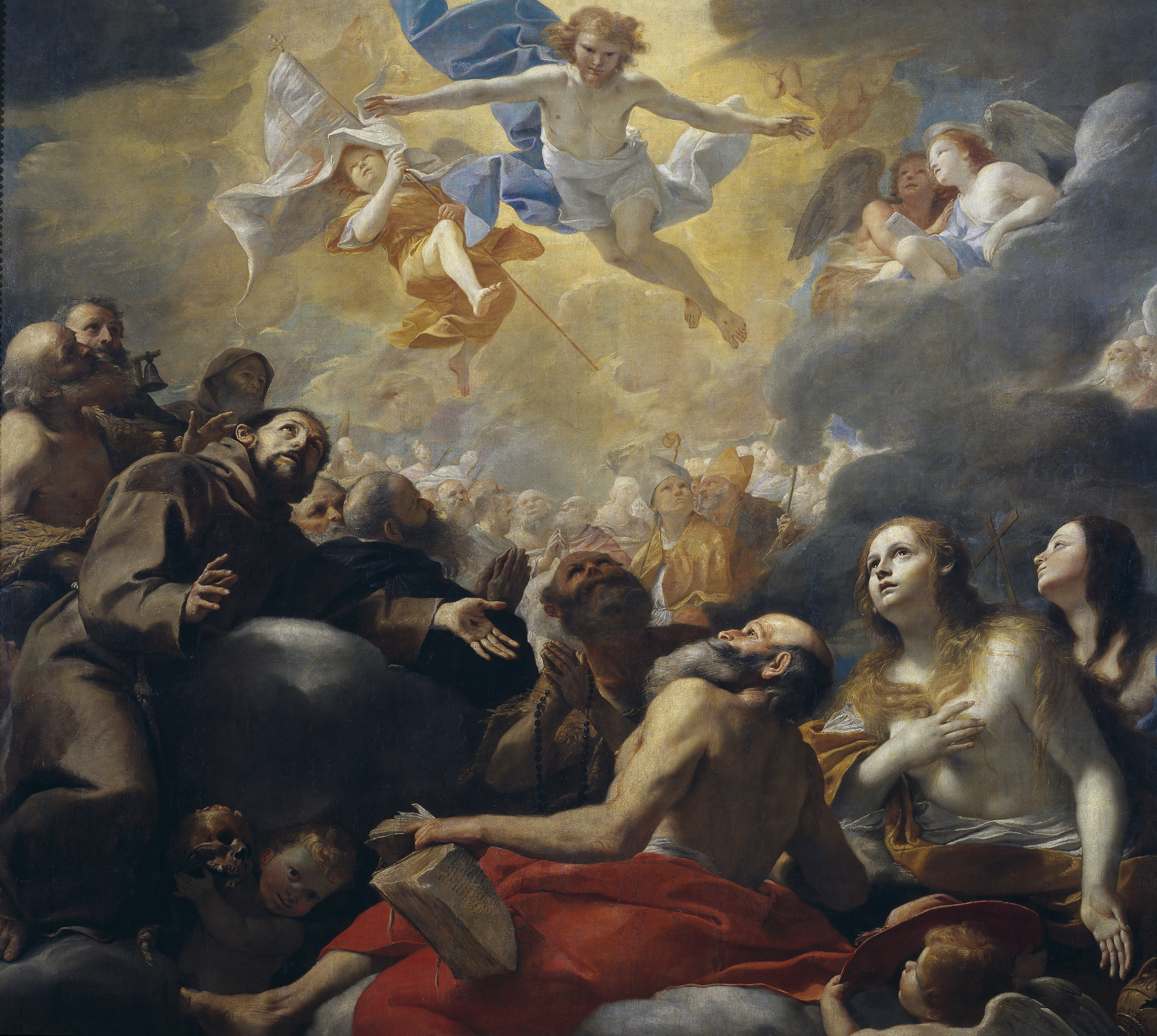
Christ in Glory with Saints, 1660-1661, Museo del Prado, Madrid

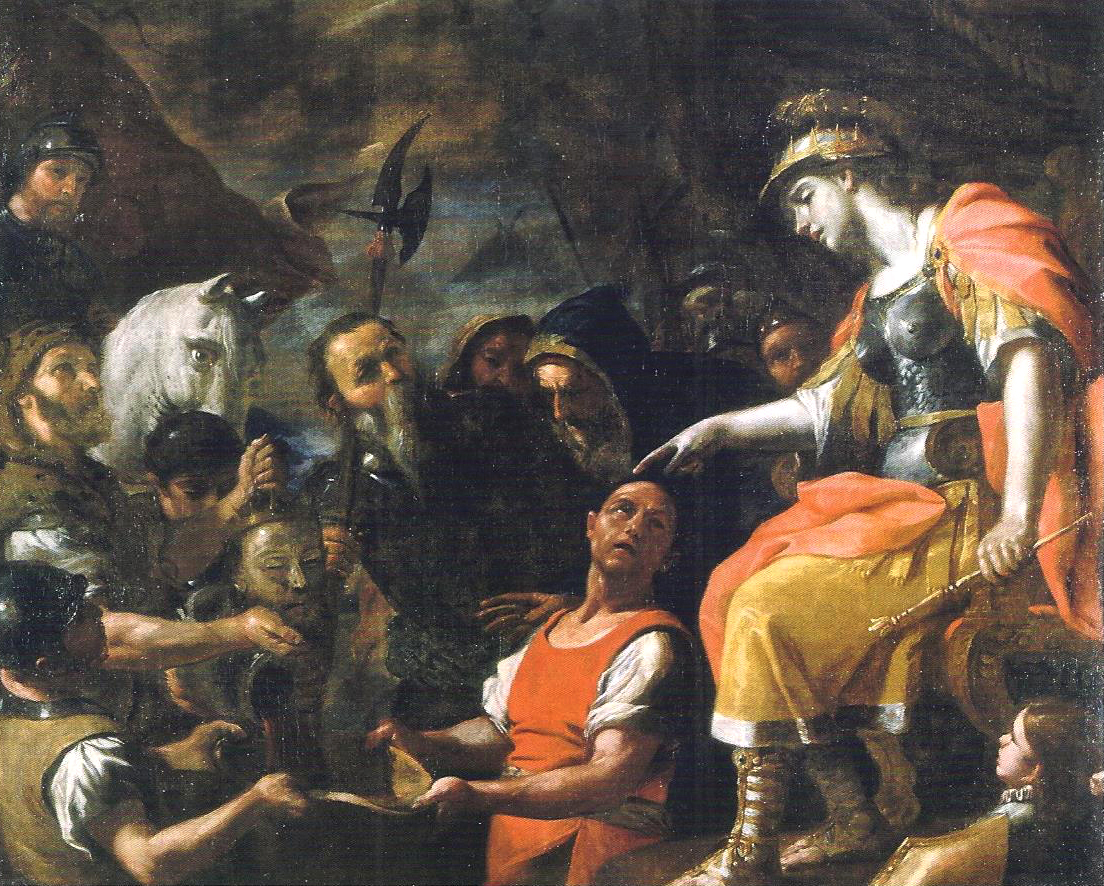
Tomyris immerses Cyrus's head in a skin bag of blood, 1685-89, 174 x 213, Louvre, Paris

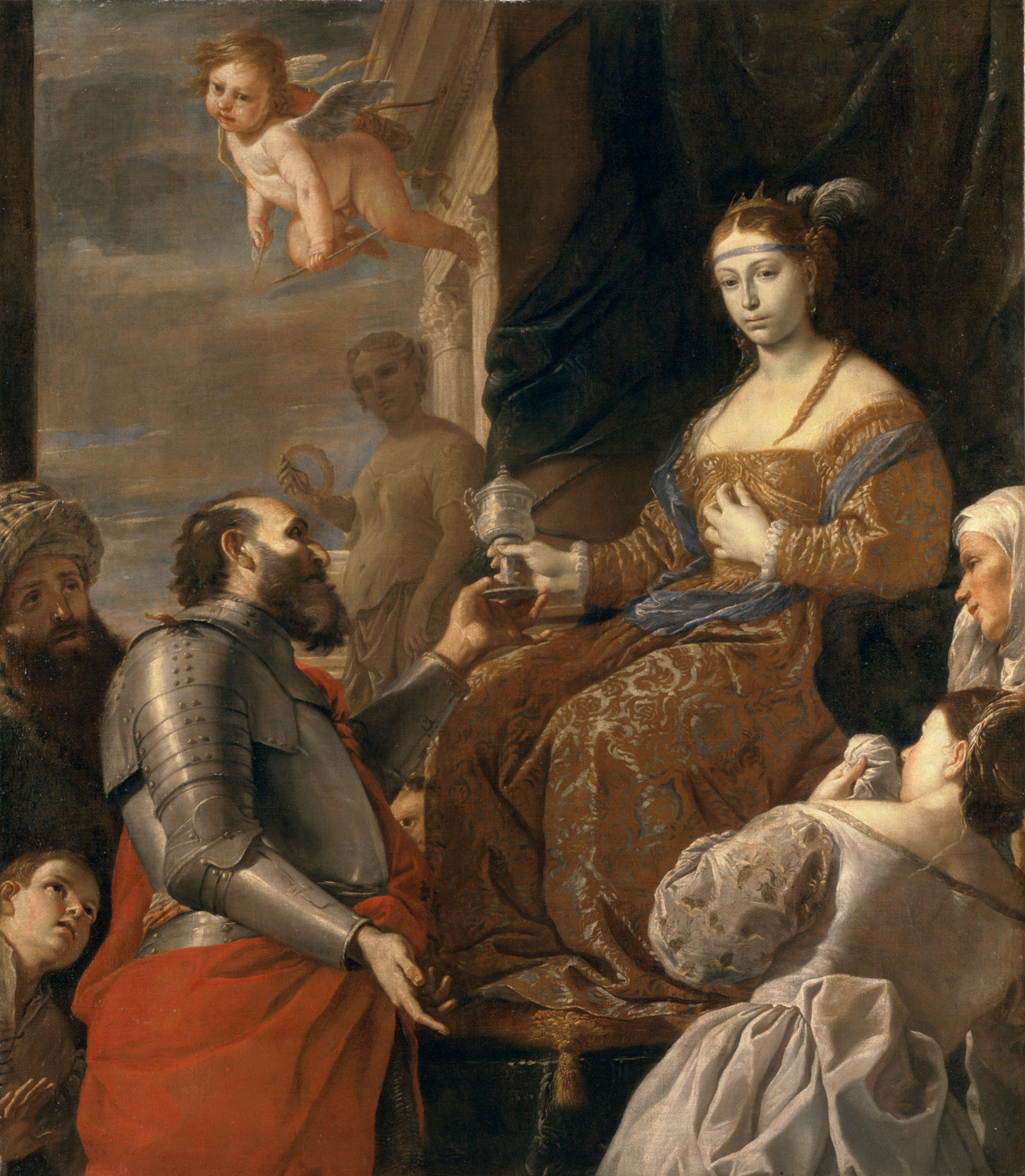
The Death of Sophonisba, c. 1660-1670, 198 x 174 cm, Museum of Fine Arts of Lyon

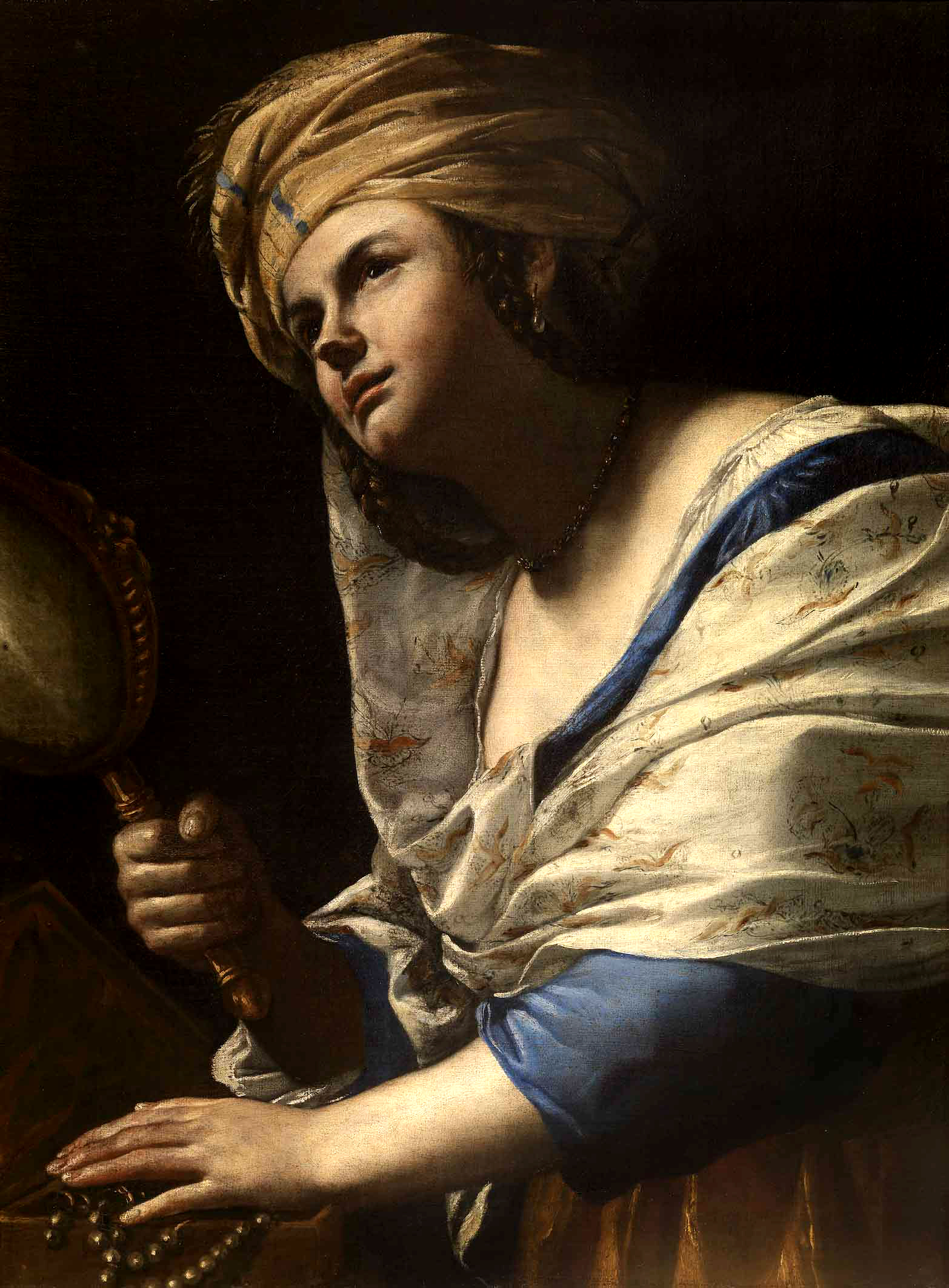
Vanitas, 1650-1651, 93,5 x 65 cm, Uffizi, Florence

The Martyrdom of Saint Paul, c. 1654-1661, Museum of Fine Arts, Houston

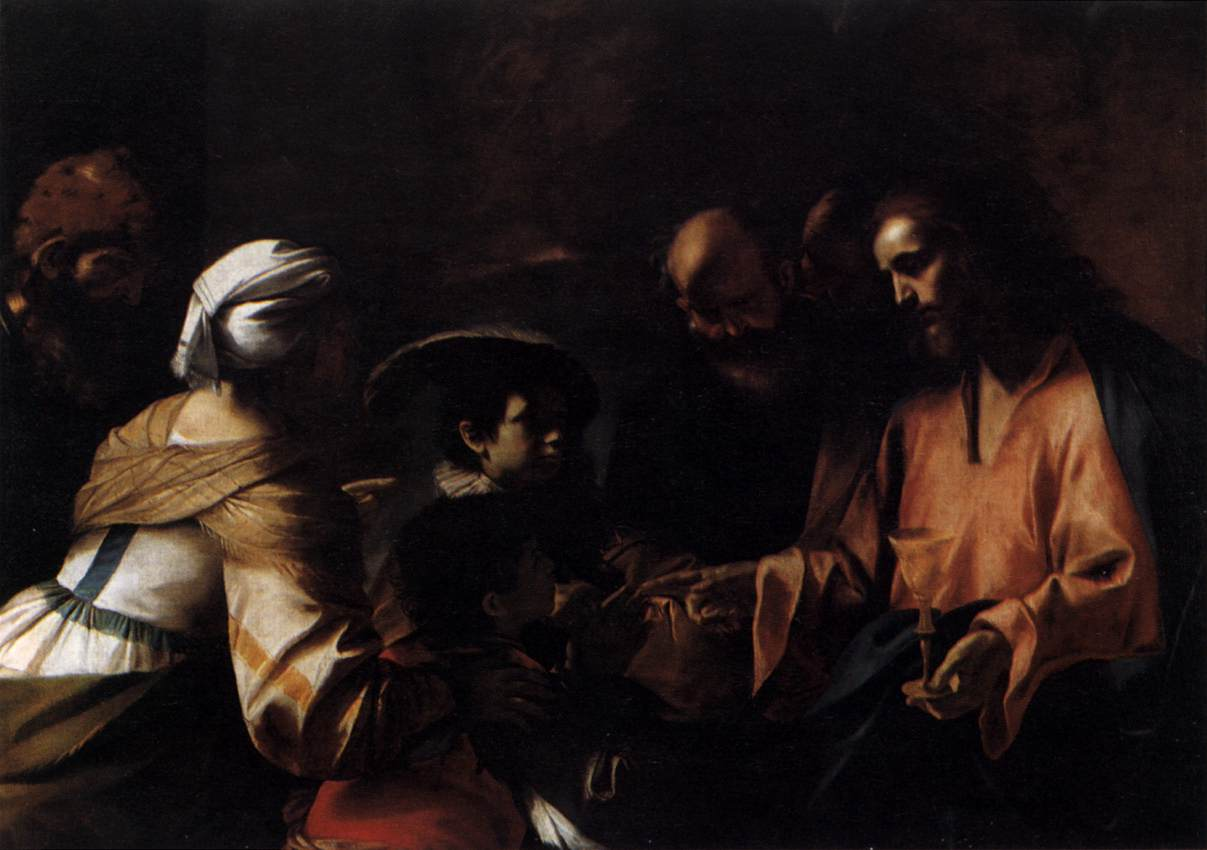
A Mother Entrusting Her Sons to Christ, c. 1635-36, 143 x 193 cm, Pinacoteca di Brera, Milan

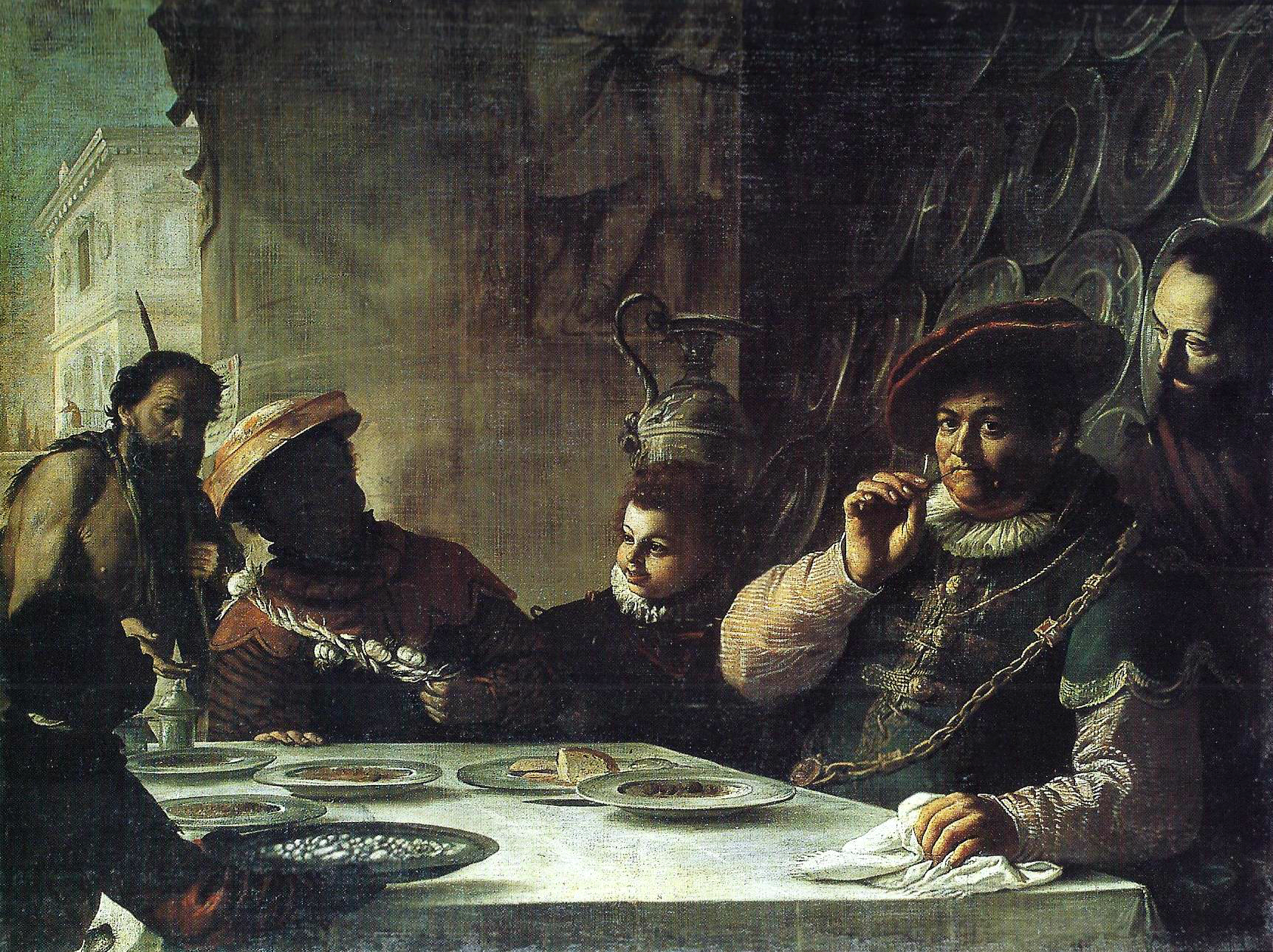
The Banquet of the Rich Glutton, c. 1665, 148 x 200 cm, Gallerie Nazionali di Arte Antica, Rome

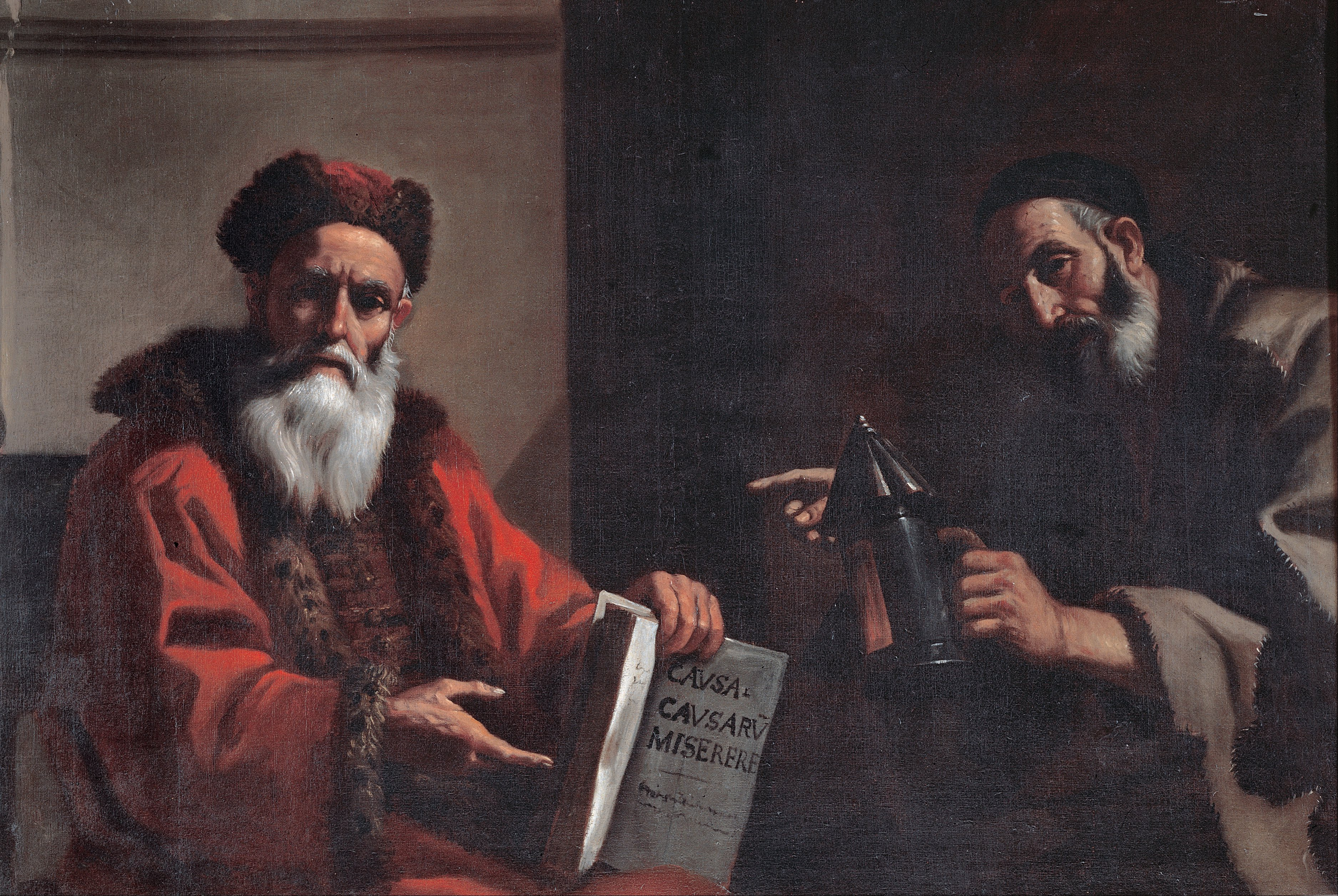
Plato and Diogenes, c. 1688, 101 x 151 cm, Capitoline Museums, Rome

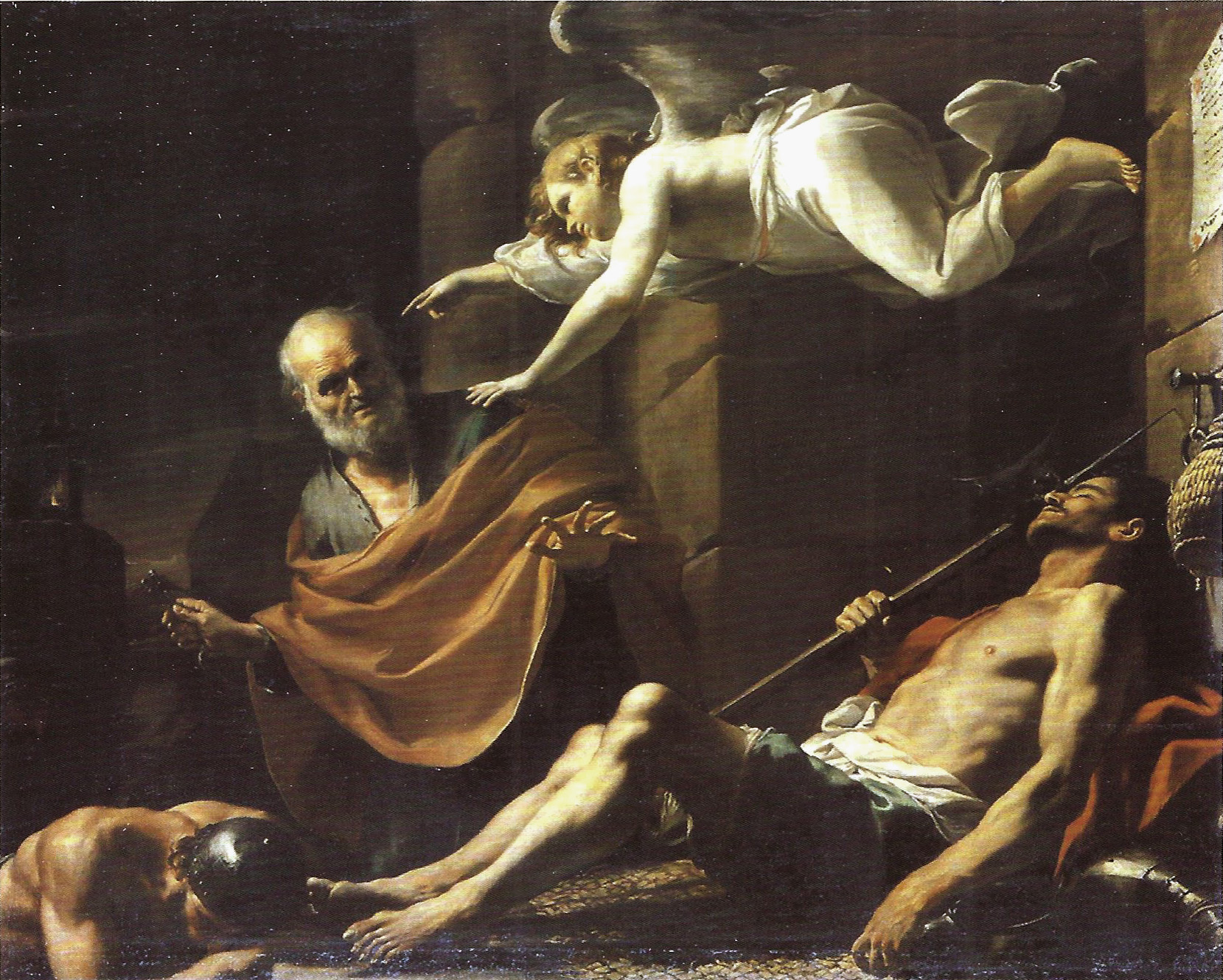
The Deliverance of St. Peter from Prison, c. 1650, 205 x 226 cm, Gemäldegalerie Alte Meister, Dresden

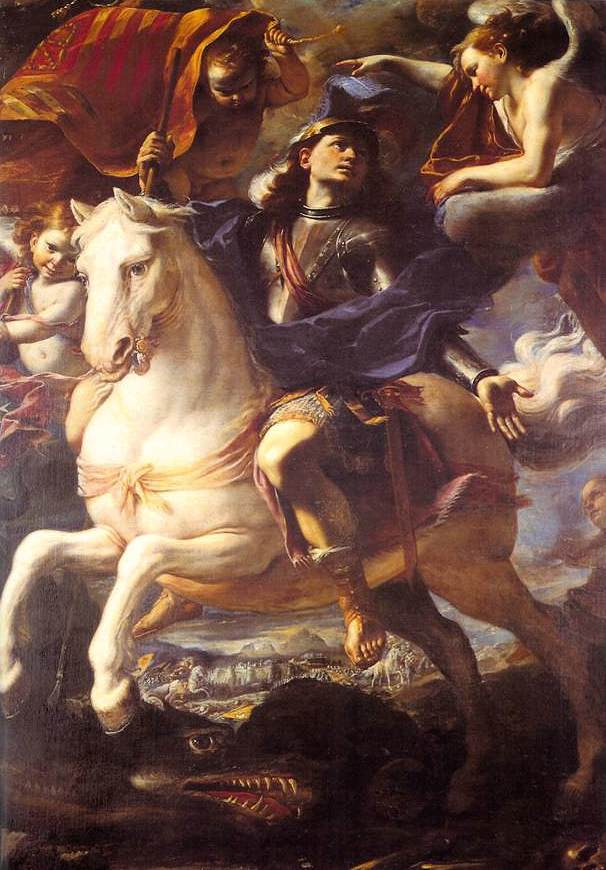
Saint George on Horseback, 1658, 275 x 207 cm, St. John's Co-Cathedral

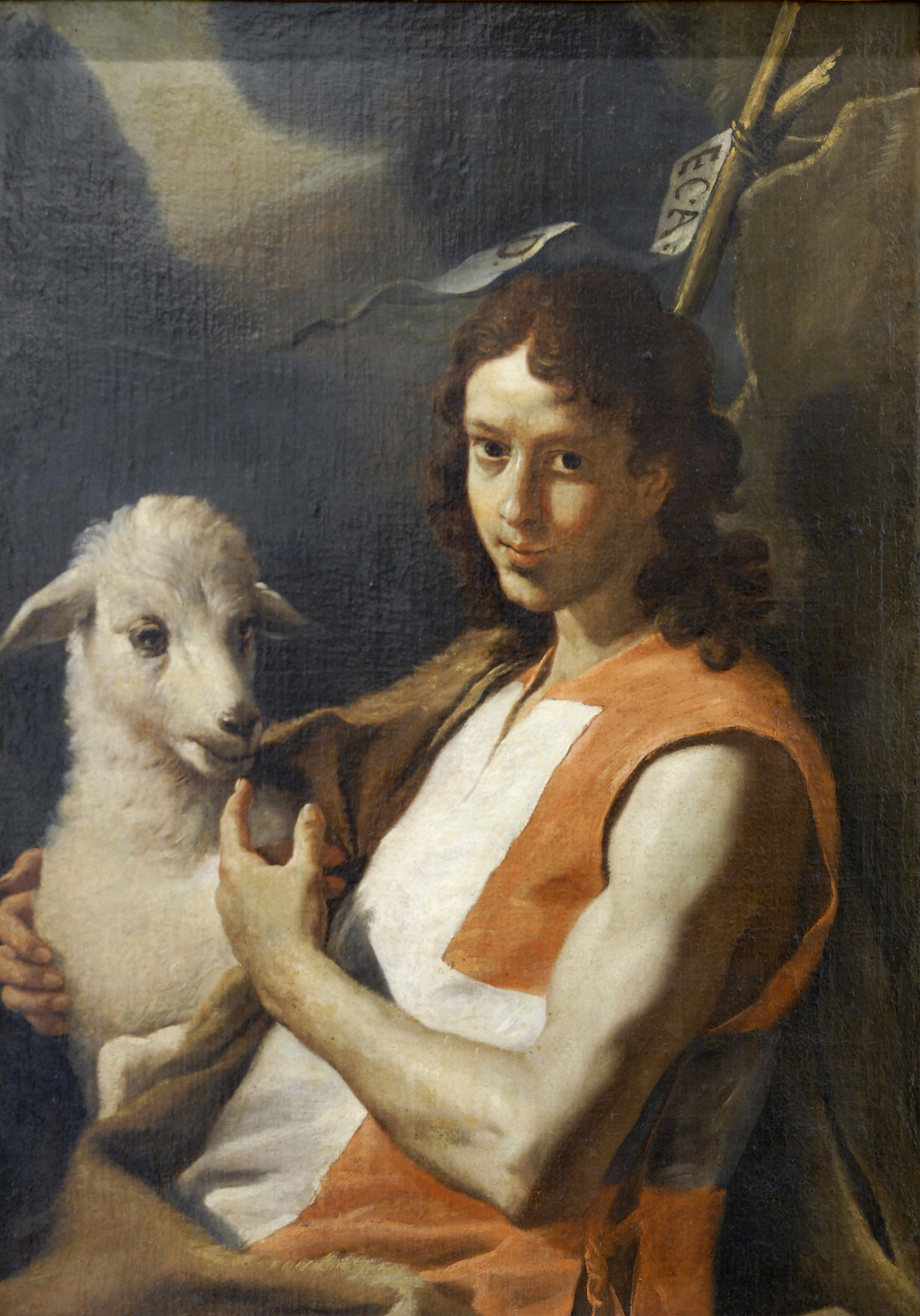
St John the Baptist Wearing the Red Tabard of the Order of St John, 1671, 98 x 78 cm, National Museum of Fine Arts, Malta

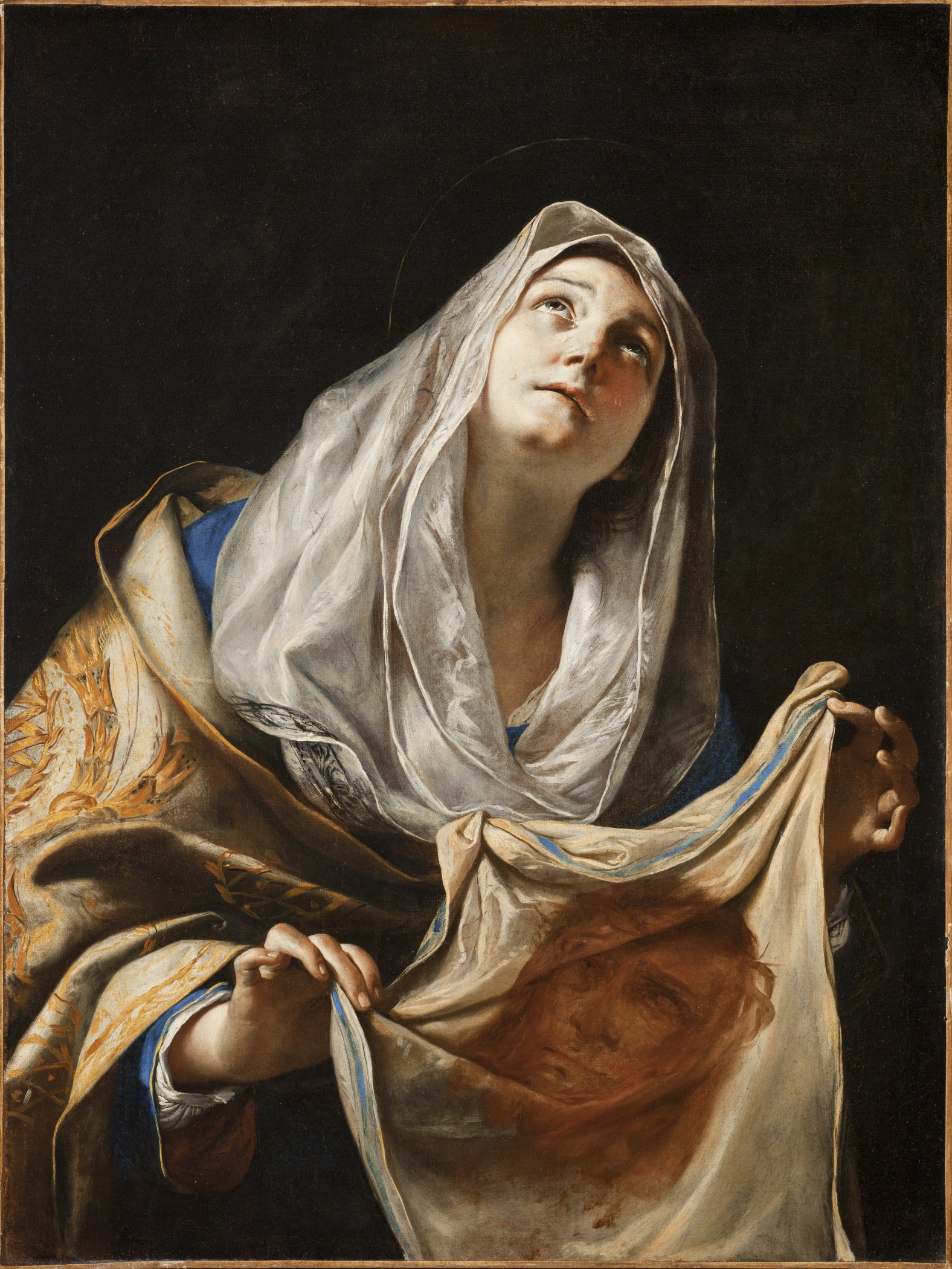
Saint Veronica with the Veil, 1655-1660, 100 x 74 cm, Los Angeles County Museum of Art

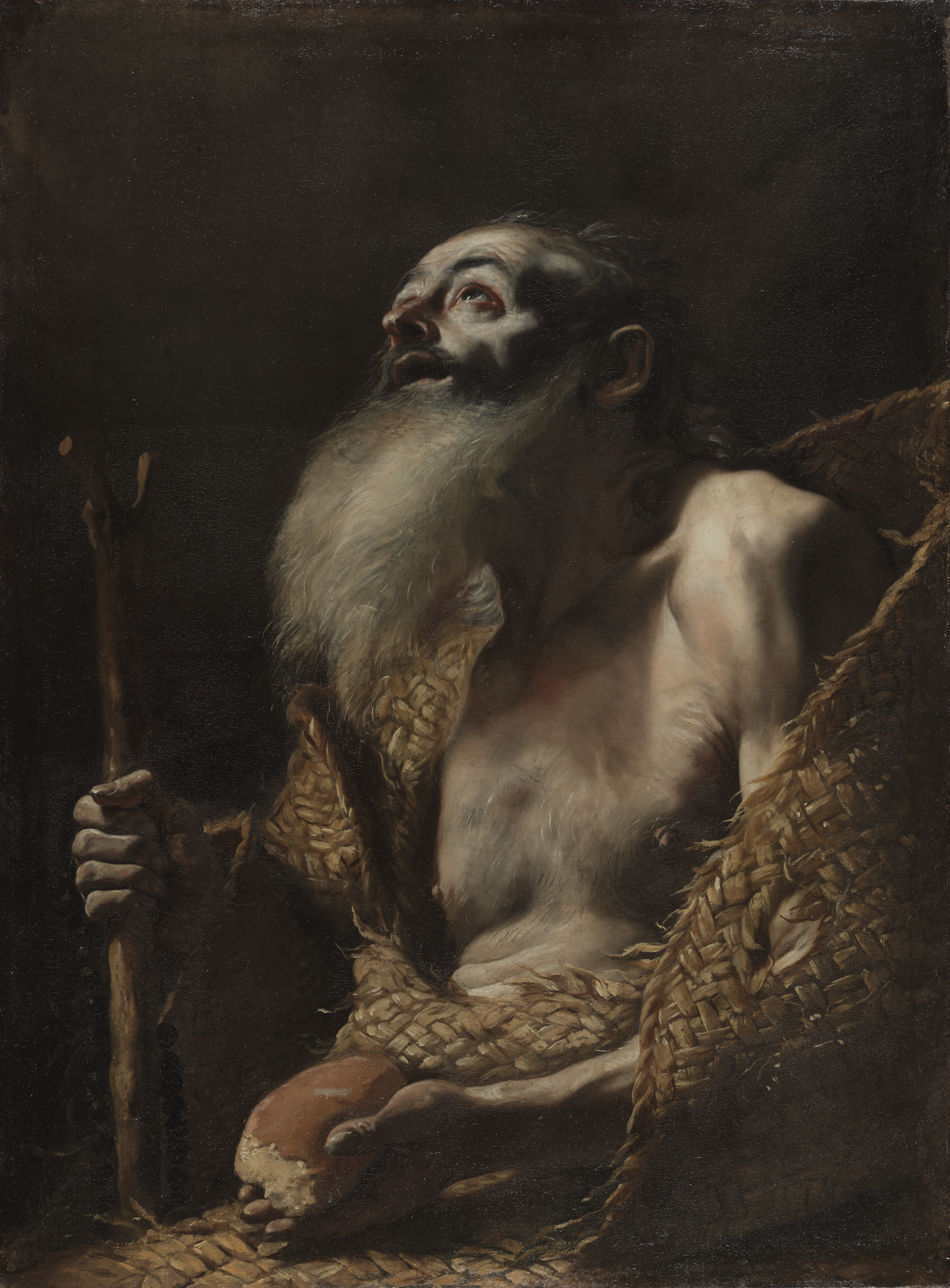
Saint Paul the Hermit, c. 1662-1664, 103 x 76 cm, Cleveland Museum of Art

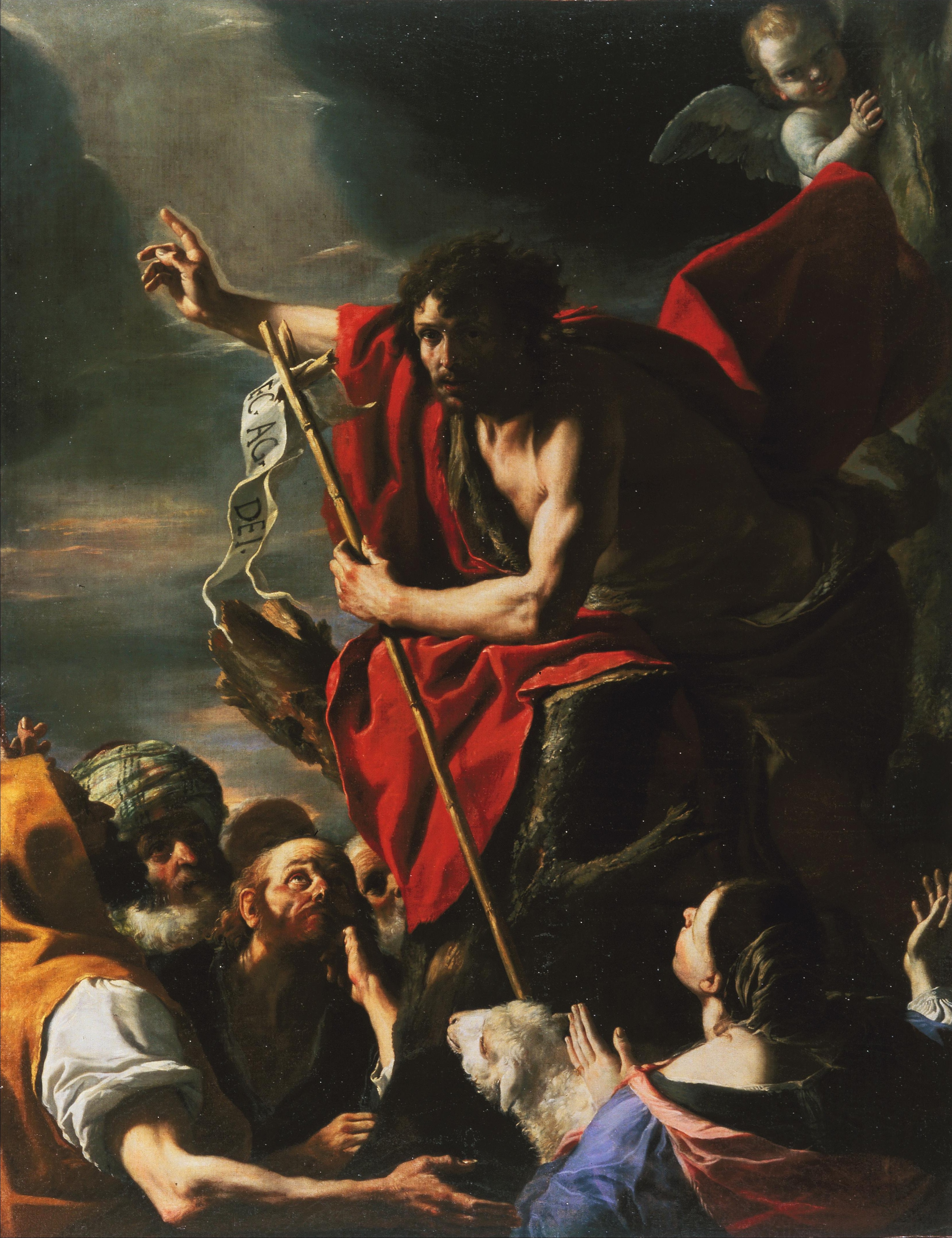
St. John the Baptist Preaching, c. 1665, Fine Arts Museums of San Francisco

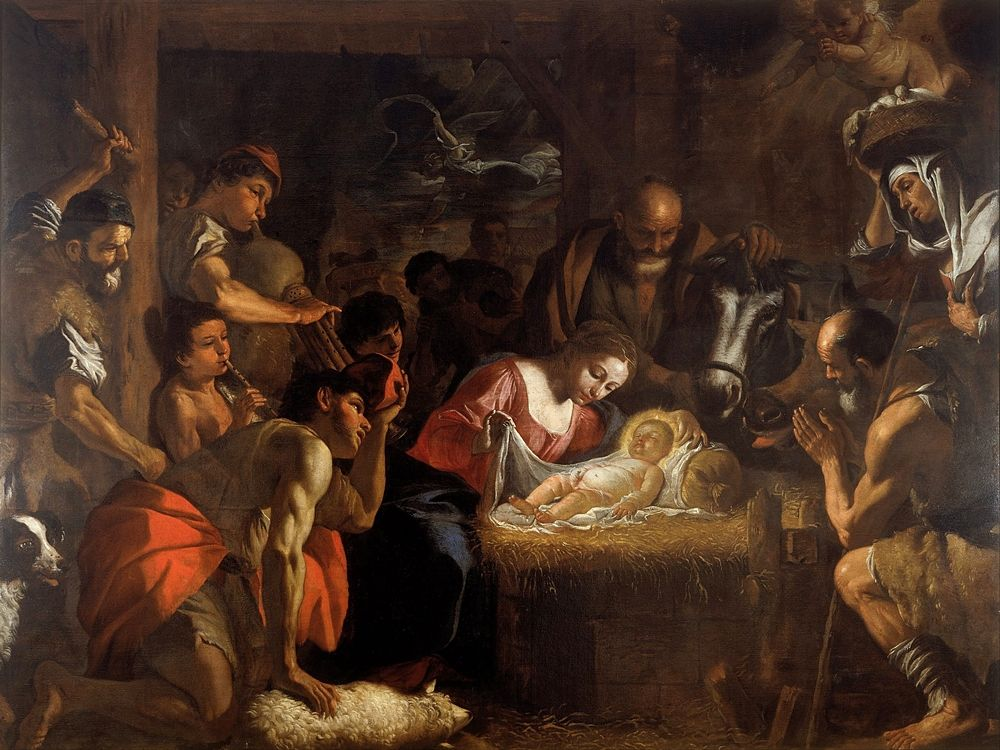
Adoration of the shepherds, c. 1678, Walker Art Gallery, Liverpool

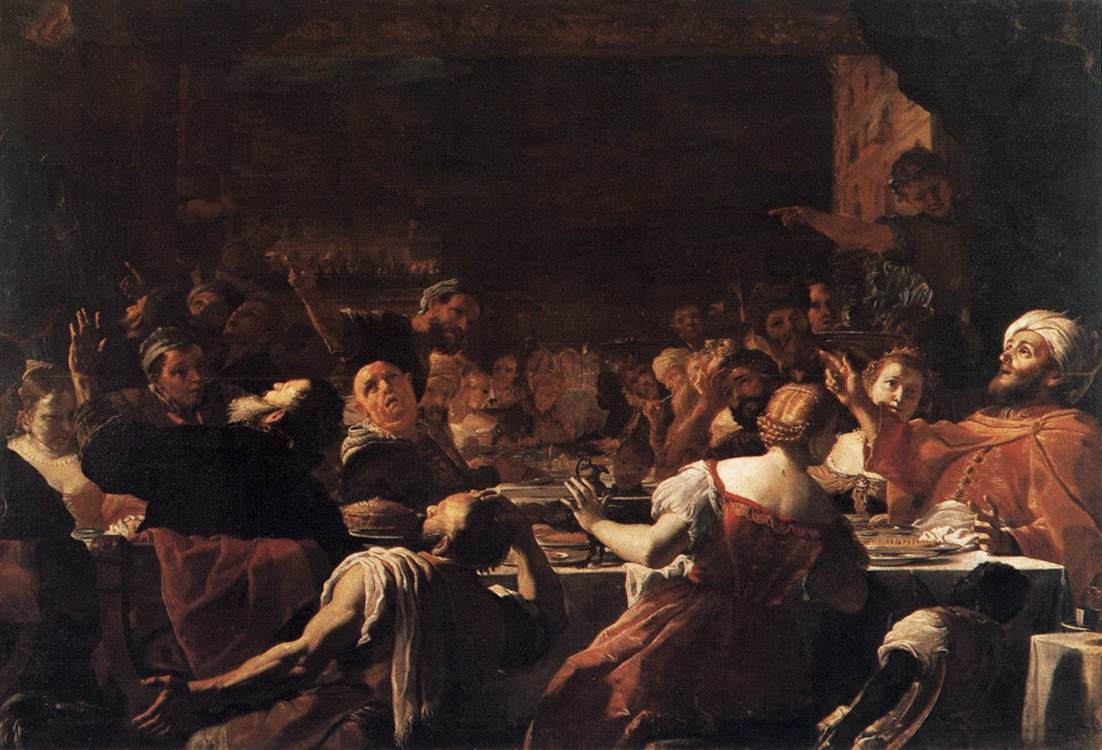
Baldassarre's Feast, 1653-1659, 202 x 297 cm, Museo di Capodimonte

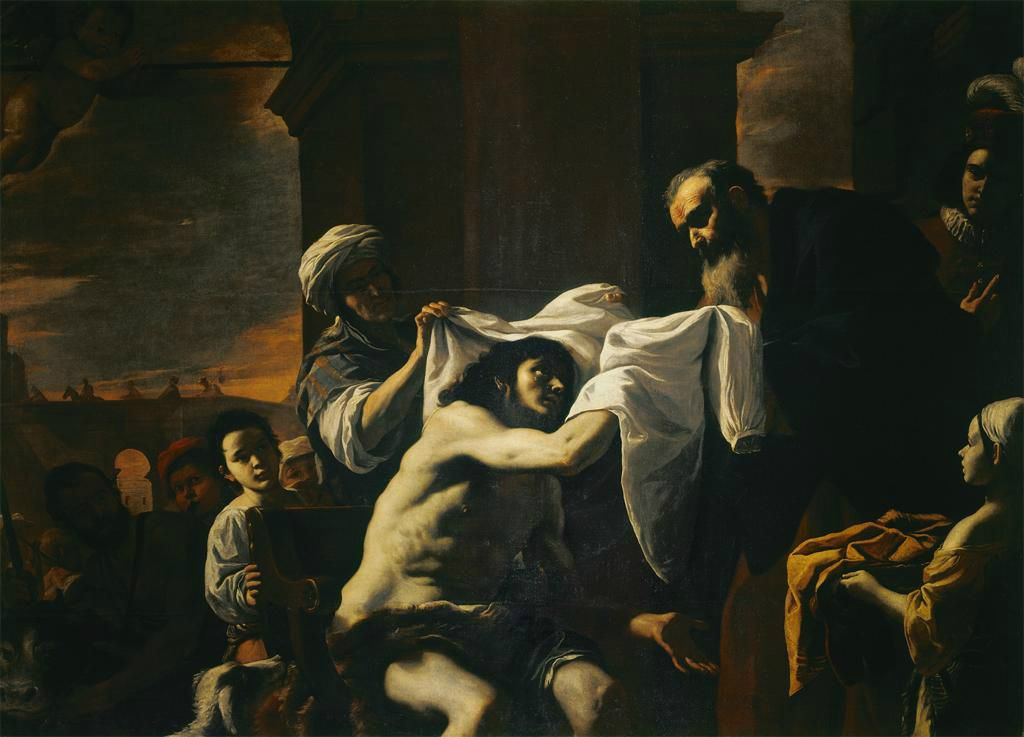
Return of the Prodigal Son, 1658, 202 x 285 cm, Royal Palace of Naples

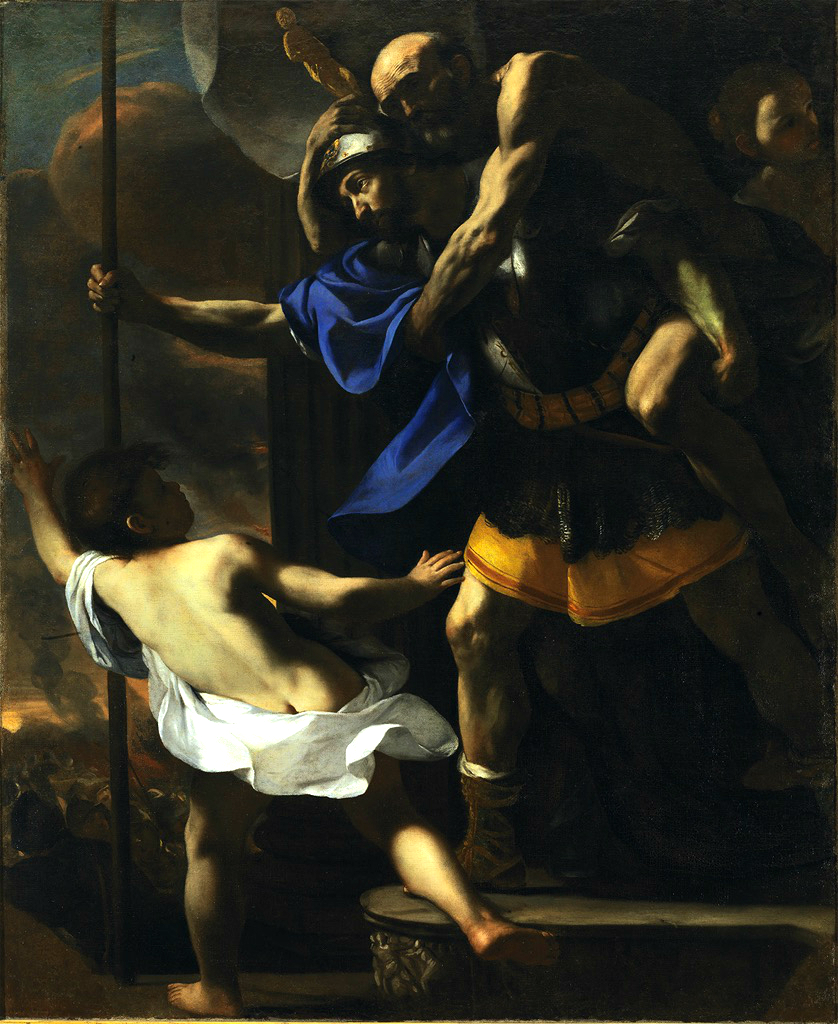
Aeneas Fleeing Troy, 1630, 86 x 153 cm, Gallerie Nazionali di Arte Antica, Rome

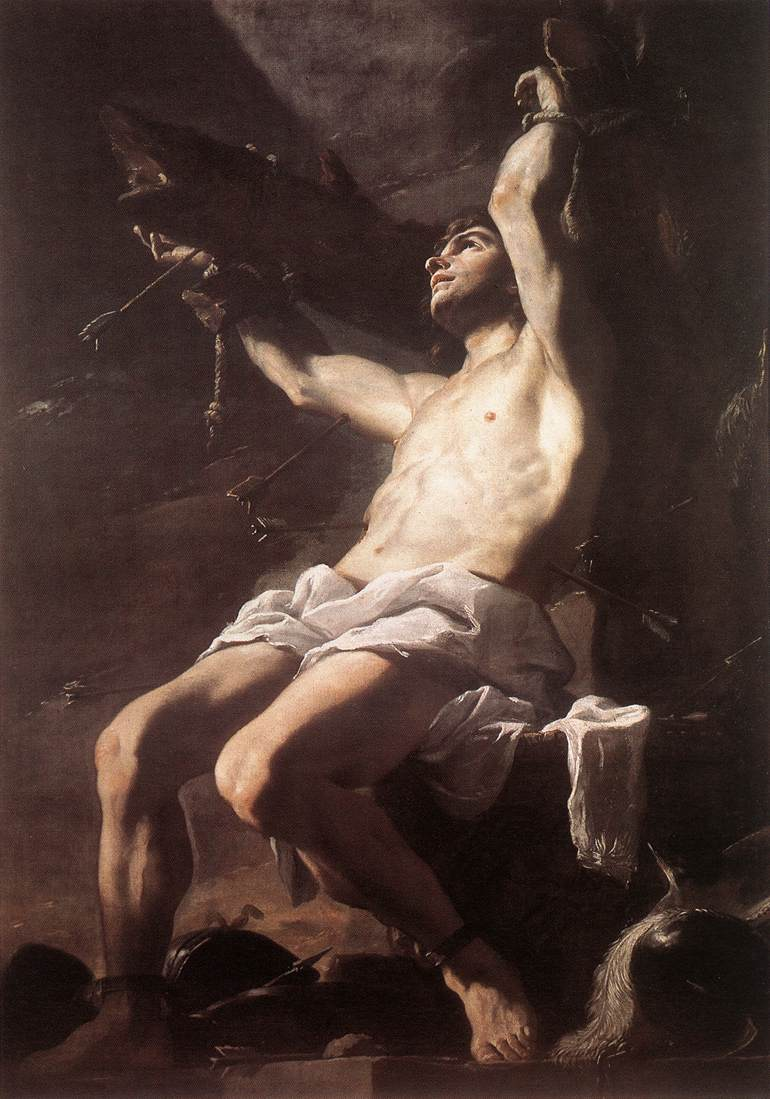
Saint Sebastian, 1660, 240 x 169 cm, Museo di Capodimonte

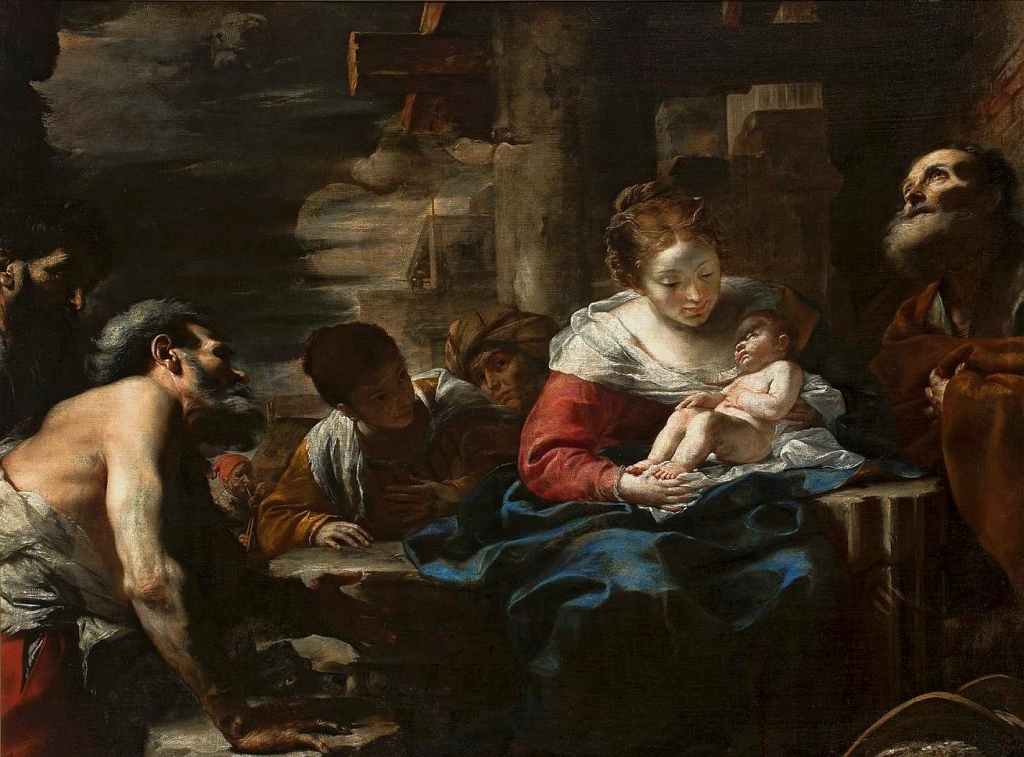
Adoration of the Shepherds, 1645, 148 x 197 cm, National Museum, Warsaw

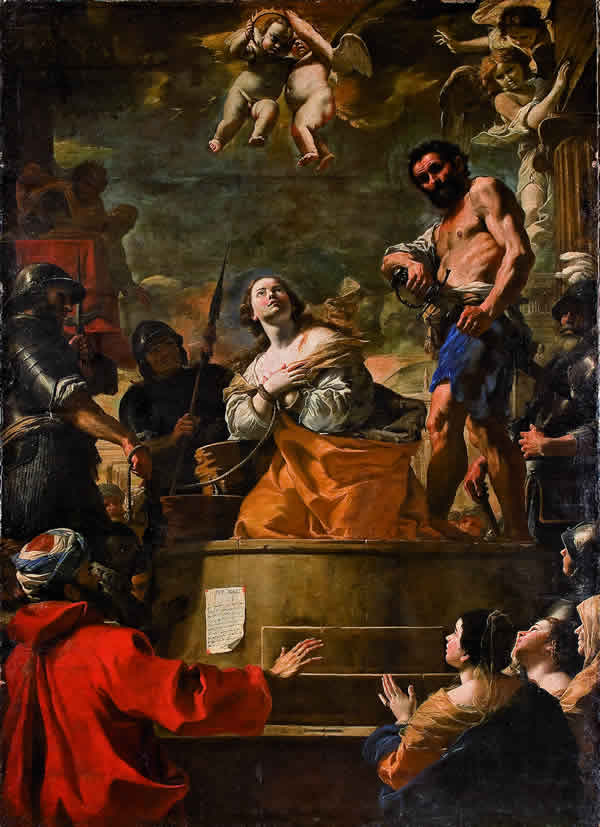
Martyrdom of Saint Catherine, 1659, 365 x 267 cm, Church of St Catherine of Italy, Valletta, Malta

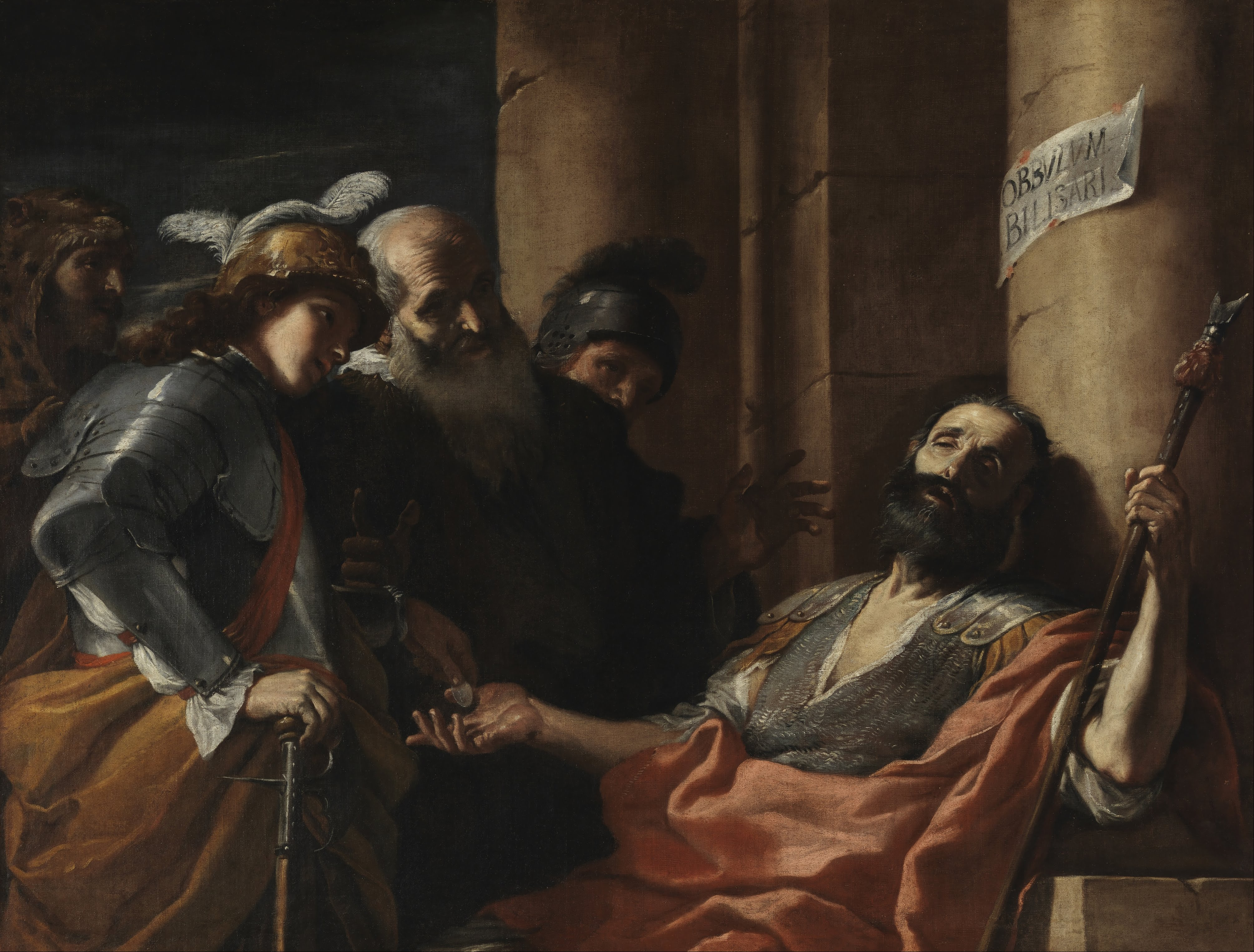
Belisarius receiving alms, 1665-1669, 152 x 198 cm, Museum Boijmans Van Beuningen, Rotterdam

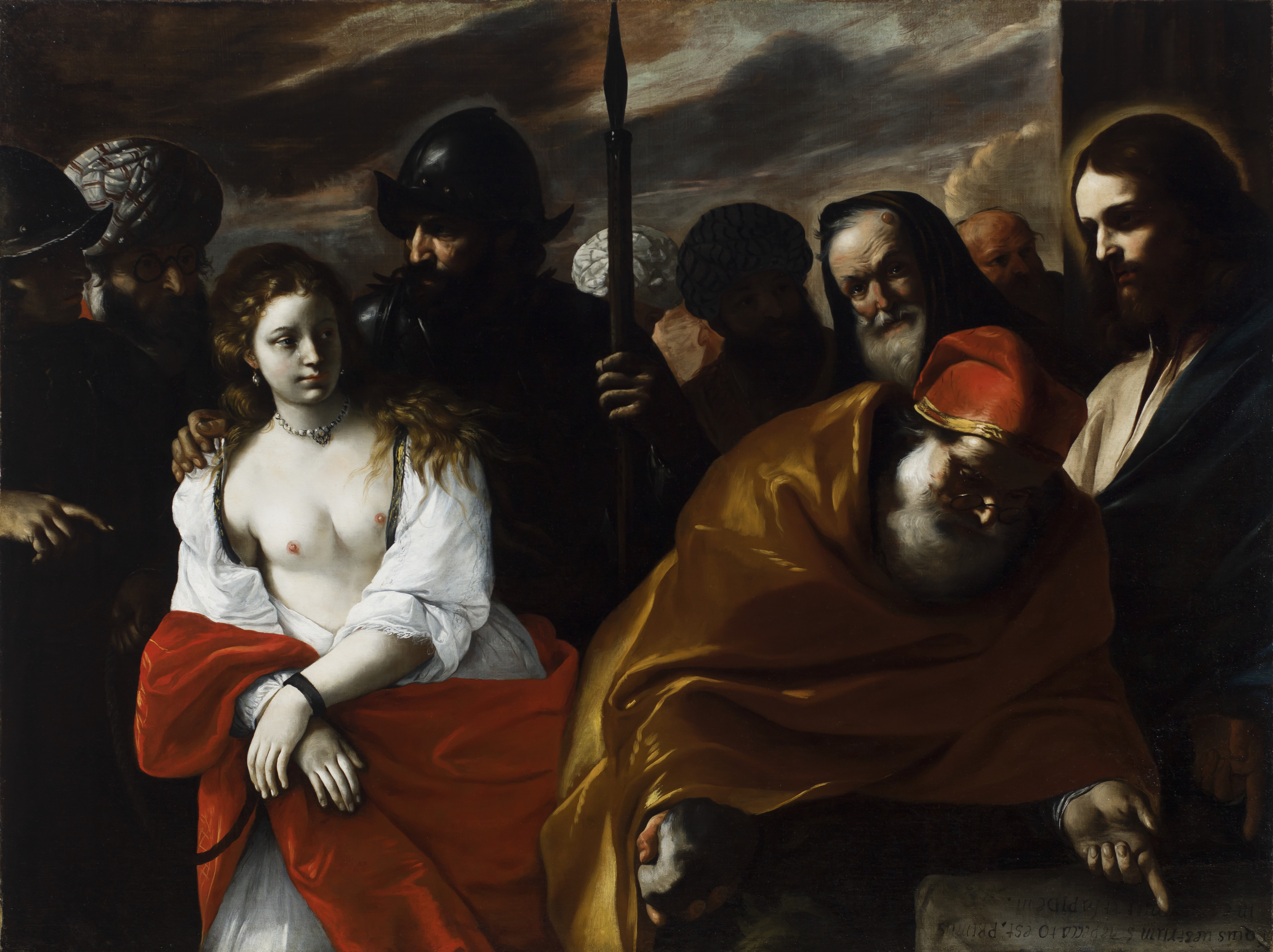
Christ and the Woman Taken in Adultery, 1640s, 143.8 × 191.8 cm, Saint Louis Art Museum
