= The Return of the Prodigal Son (Preti, Palazzo Reale) =

Painting by Mattia Preti

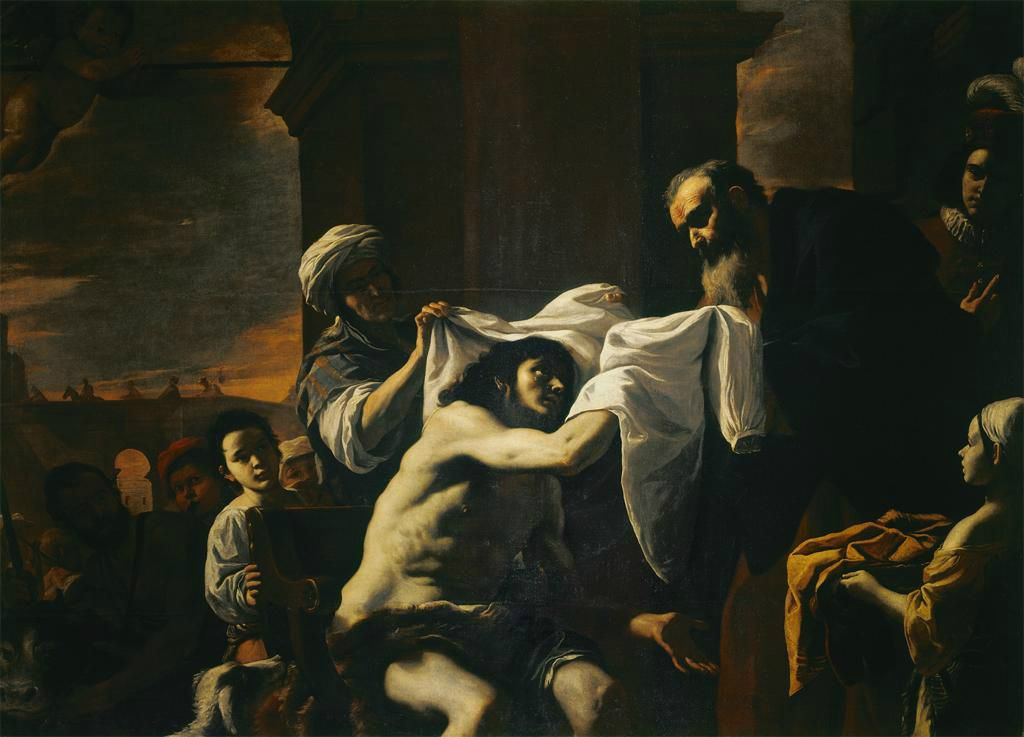
The Return of the Prodigal Son (c. 1658) by Mattia Preti

The Return of the Prodigal Son is a c. 1658 oil on canvas painting by Mattia Preti, now in the Royal Palace of Naples.

Nothing certain is known about the canvas's early life, though it is known to have been in marquess Torlonia's collection until 1802, when it and thirty other paintings were acquired from that collection by Domenico Venuti, an emissary for the Sicilian Bourbons tasked with acquiring artworks for the royal collection. The thirty-eight also included two other Preti works, Christ Going to Calvary (now in the Museo Nazionale di Capodimonte in Naples) and Ecce Homo (now in the Musée Condé in Chantilly, France).
