= The Death of Sophonisba (Preti) =

Painting by Mattia Preti

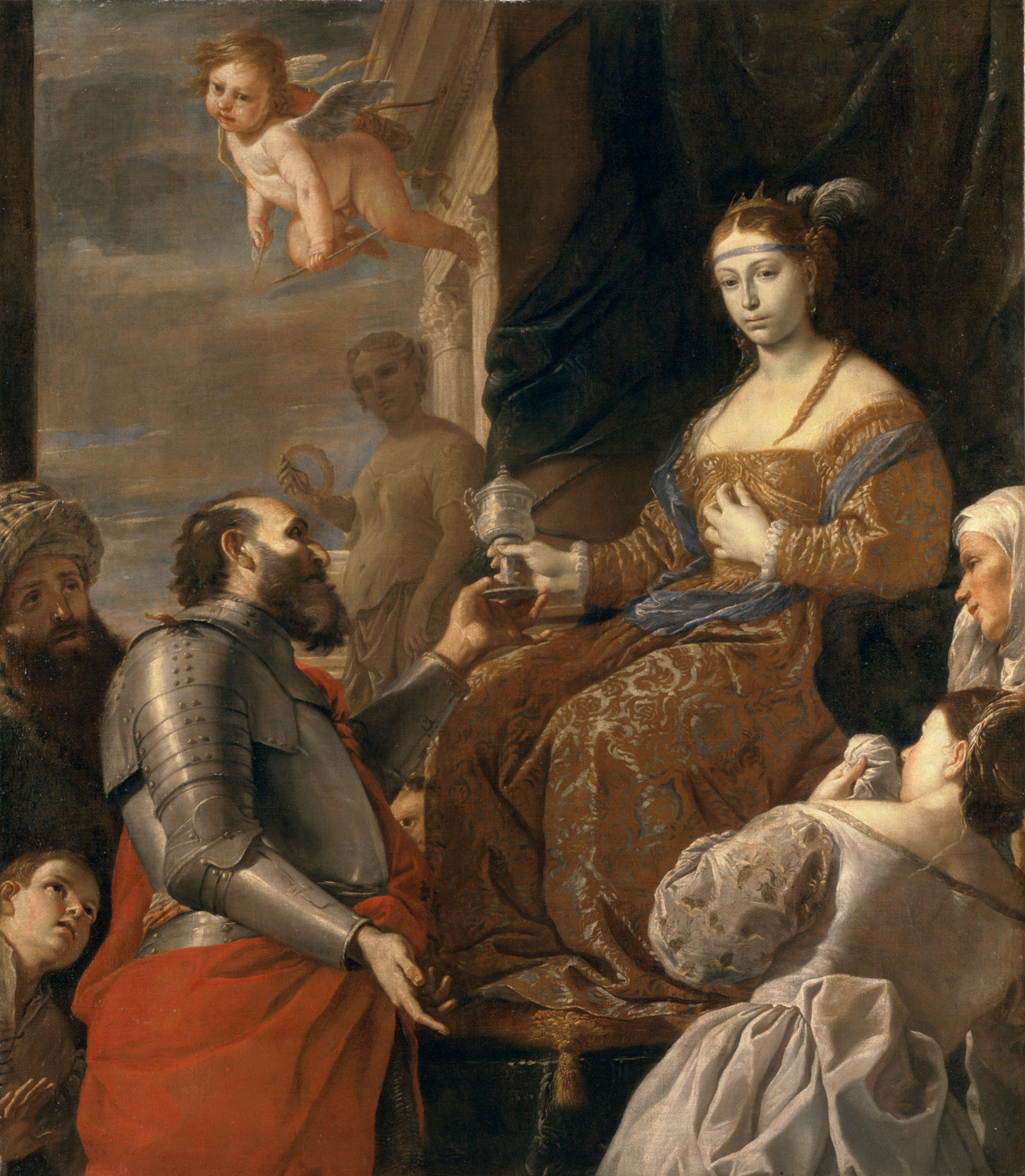
- Artist: Mattia Preti
- Year: c. 1670
- Medium: Oil on canvas
- Dimensions: 201 cm × 178 cm (79 in × 70 in)
- Location: Museum of Fine Arts of Lyon, Lyon

The Death of Sophonisba or Sophonisba Taking Poison is a 1670s painting by Mattia Preti depicting the suicide of Sophonisba in Ancient Carthage. It is held in the Museum of Fine Arts of Lyon.

== Description ==
This Baroque painting evokes great power and a dynamic quality. Preti was influenced by the pathetic and dark art of Caravaggio. It has a theatrical character while the architectural elements serve as a backdrop. Sophonisbe is pale and disfigured, it seems to be showing the rapid effect of the poison she has just taken. Her left hand rests on her chest, and she holds the poison with the right hand. The pallor of her face demonstrates the accomplished effect of her fatal act. Massinissa wears a red toga over the shoulder representing both murder and destructive love. Sophonisbe wears blue fabric, a rare color reserved for important people. This love is also highlighted by the putto, a little angel, representative of Baroque art. All viewers are directed towards Sophonisbe, the main character of the scene. A woman in the lower right hides her nose with a handkerchief as a sign of anxiety. The sky, which can be seen at the top right, is covered by many clouds ranging from gray to black. These colors that darken the sky refer to the death of Sophonisbe.

== Provenance and restoration ==
In 1802, the painting was acquired by the Neapolitan government to be given to France in compensation for the paintings taken from the French deposits of the Church of San Luigi dei Francesi in Rome. In 1804, the painting arrived in Paris. It is held at the Museum of Fine Arts of Lyon.

In 1987, the painting was restored after an examination by the LRMF (French Museums Research Laboratory) in the Versailles workshops. The examination revealed the presence of several changes, including a horizontal seam in the middle part of the painting (passing at the level of the neck of the figure receiving the cut) and the whole of the pictorial layer has been obscured by a very thick greenish-brown varnish. The edges of the painting had been cut during the previous relining (a restoration operation). The restoration consisted of reattaching the previous layer, lightening the varnish and eliminating the repaints by removing with a scalpel any astic, grime and accumulations of varnish. Then, the work was subjected to the resumption of wear and the painting of the re-harmonization glazes in watercolor on the right forearm of the man in armor. The restoration ended with a general varnishing of the work.
