= The Martyrdom of Saint Peter (Preti) =

Painting by Mattia Preti

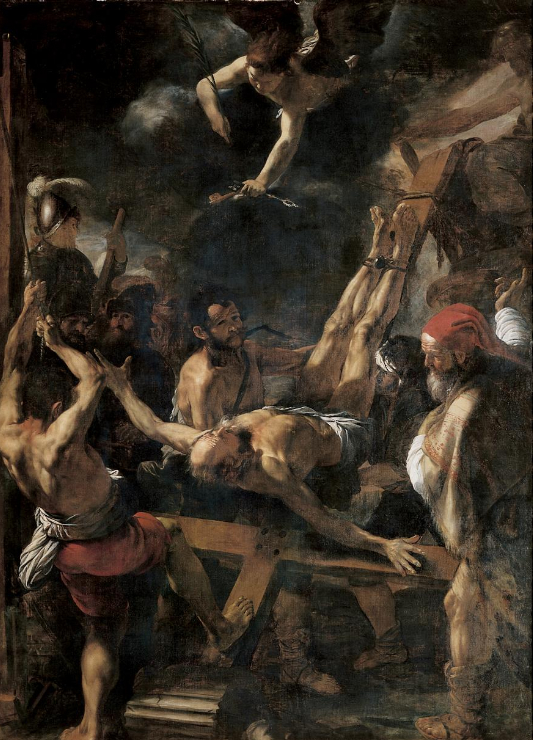

The Martyrdom of Saint Peter is a c.1630-1650 oil on canvas painting by Mattia Preti, now in the Museum of Grenoble, which acquired it in 1828. It had previously passed through the Palais Royal's collection (which it entered in 1728).
