= Vanitas (Preti) =

Painting by Mattia Preti

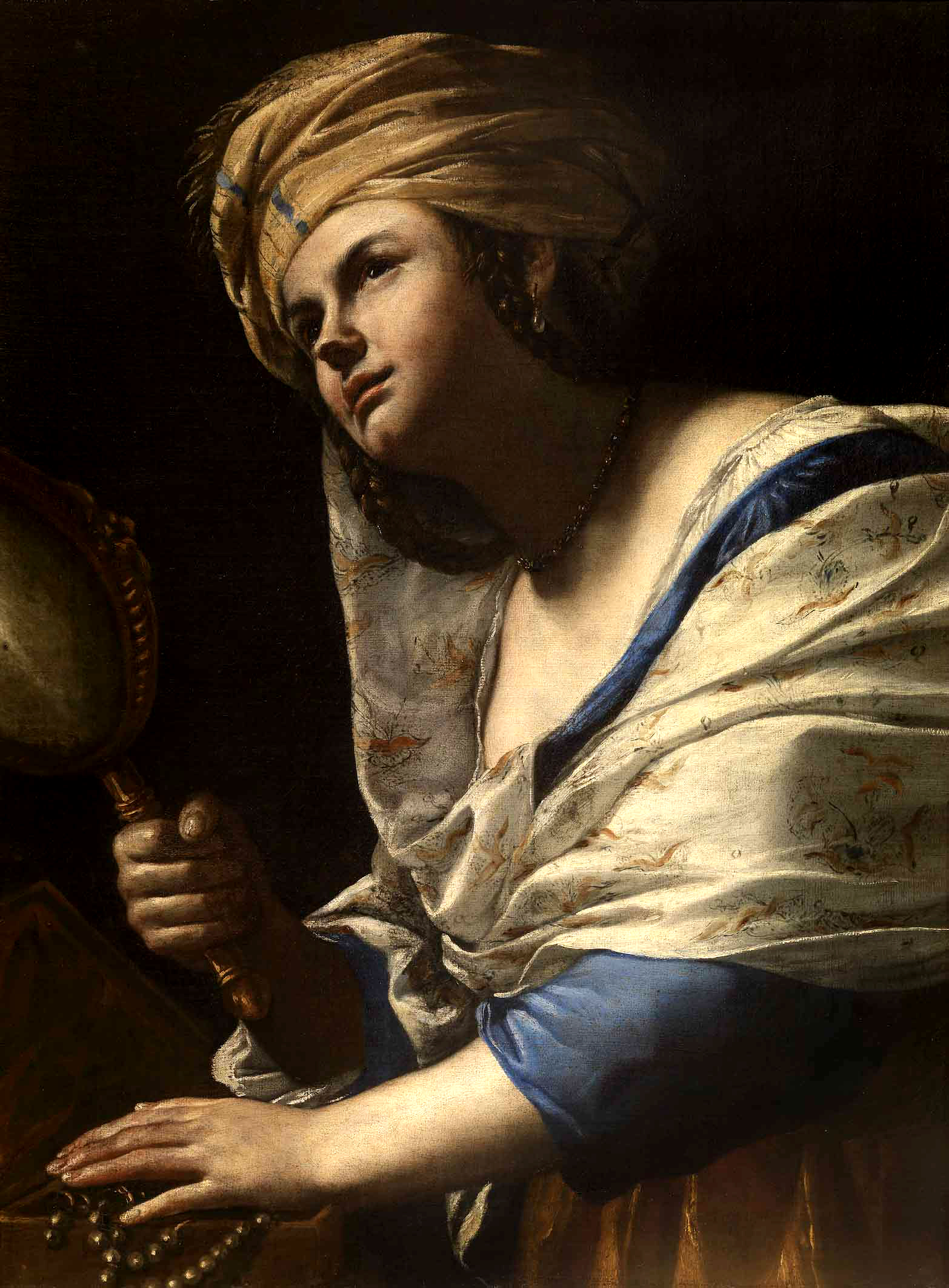
Vanitas (c. 1650–1670) by Mattia Preti

Vanitas is an oil-on-canvas painting executed ca. 1650–1670 by the Italian artist Mattia Preti, now inventory number 9283 in the Uffizi in Florence, for which it was bought in 1951 from a private collection. Art historians disagree on whether the painting is a fragment of a larger work or retains its original dimensions, as well as whether it is a general vanitas or depicts Mary Magdalene.
