= Baptist (disambiguation) =

The Baptists are a Protestant Christian denomination.

Baptist or Baptists may also refer to:

== Religion ==
- Baptist beliefs
- List of Baptists
- List of Baptist churches
- List of Baptist denominations
- A person who baptizes people, who performs a baptism
  - John the Baptist, Jewish religious figure and element of Christian religion

== People ==
- Baptist (surname)
- Baptist Fernando (1933–2017), Sri Lankan Sinhala actor and producer

== Other uses ==
- Baptist, Kentucky, USA; a town
- Baptists (band), Canadian hardcore punk band
- Baptist College (disambiguation), multiple schools
- Baptist University (disambiguation), multiple schools

== See also ==
- Baptism (disambiguation)
- St. John the Baptist (disambiguation)
- Saint John (disambiguation)
- Batista (Spanish/Portuguese surname)
- Battista (Italian surname and given name) Italian term meaning "Baptist"
- Bautista (Spanish surname) Spanish term meaning "Baptist"
- Baptista (Portuguese surname) Portuguese term meaning "Baptist"
- Baptiste (name) (French surname and given name) French term meaning "Baptist"
- Baptiste (disambiguation)
- Baptista (disambiguation)
