= John Baptist =

John Baptist is a male given name, middle name, and baptismal name, originating with Saint John the Baptist. Equivalents in other languages include Jean-Baptiste (French), Johann Baptist (German), João Batista (Portuguese), Juan Bautista (Spanish), and Giovanni Battista (Italian). The name may refer to any of the following:

== Persons ==
=== Given and baptismal name ===
- John Baptist Abyssinian (1509-1567), Bishop of Holy Saviour in Nicosia
- John Baptist Albertrandi (1731-1808), Polish Jesuit of Italian extraction
- John Baptist Ashe (1748–1802), North Carolina delegate to the Continental Congress
- John Baptist Austin (1799–1882), English schoolmaster and minister, later in South Australia
- John Baptist Bullaker, also known as Thomas Bullaker (c. 1604 - 1642), priest and Martyr of the English Reformation
- John Baptist Butt (1826–1899), English Roman Catholic bishop
- John Baptist Cahill, Roman Catholic Bishop of Portsmouth
- John Baptist Caryll (1713–1788), third and last Baron Caryll of Durford
- Jean Baptiste Claude Chatelain (1710–1758), French engraver
- John Baptist Collins (died 1794), would-be French pirate
- John Baptist Con Ngoc Tran, layman, one of the Vietnamese Martyrs
- Johann Baptist Cramer (1771–1858), sometimes spelt John Baptist Cramer, German composer
- John Baptist Crozier (1858–1920), Anglican bishop in Ireland
- John Baptist Mary David (1761–1841), prelate
- John Baptist de Faria (born 1871), Portuguese physician
- John Baptist Franz (1896–1992), American Roman Catholic bishop
- John Baptist Gagnon (1883–1939), American strongman performer
- John Baptist Grano (c. 1692–c. 1748), English trumpeter, flutist, and composer
- John-Baptist Hackett (died 1676), Irish Dominican theologian
- John-Baptist Hoffmann (1857–1928), German Jesuit, anthropologist and Munda scholar
- John Baptist Huang Min-Cheng (born 1955), Roman Catholic bishop of Tainan
- John Baptist Hogan (1829–1901), Irish-French Catholic theologian and educator
- John Baptist Jackson (1701–1780), British artist
- John Baptist Jaspers (died 1691), Flemish painter and tapestry designer
- John Baptist Kaggwa (1998–2019), Ugandan Roman Catholic prelate, bishop of Masaka
- John Baptist Kakubi (1969–1991), Ugandan Roman Catholic prelate, Bishop of Mbarara
- John Baptist Lafargue (1864–?), American educator, newspaper publisher
- John Baptist Liu Jingshan (1984–2009), Chinese Roman Catholic prelate, Bishop of Ningxia
- John Baptist Malchair (c. 1730 – 1812), German artist, violinist and collector of traditional music in Oxford
- John Baptist Medina (1659–1710), artist of Flemish-Spanish origin who worked in England and Scotland
- John Baptist Meÿenberg (1847–1914), founder of Pet, Inc.
- John Baptist Miège (1815-1884), American Jesuit prelate and missionary
- John Baptist Morris (1866–1946), American prelate of the Roman Catholic Church
- John Baptist Mukasa (1967-2021), Ugandan neurosurgeon
- John Baptist Tuohill Murphy (1854–1926), Irish Roman Catholic priest
- John Baptist Nambeshe (born 1965), Ugandan politician and social worker
- John Baptist Lucius Noel (1890–1989), British army officer, adventurer, mountaineer (official photographer of the 1922 and 1924 British Mount Everest expeditions)
- John Baptist Odama (born 1947), Catholic Archbishop Emeritus of Gulu, Uganda
- John Baptist Pitaval (1858–1928), French-born clergyman of the Roman Catholic Church
- John Baptist Purcell (1800–1883), Irish-born American prelate of the Roman Catholic Church
- John Baptist Scandella (1821-1880), Gibraltarian bishop
- John Baptist Sequeira (1987–2006), Indian Roman Catholic prelate, Bishop of Chikmagalur
- John Baptist Sleyne (c. 1638 – 1712), Irish Roman Catholic prelate
- John Baptist Smith (1843–1923), Confederate States Army officer, invented and helped build a lantern system of naval signaling
- John Baptist Snowden (1801-1885), Methodist minister and American slave who bought his freedom
- John Baptist Thanh Van Dinh, catechist, one of the Vietnamese Martyrs
- John Baptist Todd (1921–2017), Pakistani Franciscan priest
- John Baptist Walsh (c. 1750–1825), Irish cleric and administrator
- John Baptist Walusimbi, Ugandan politician and engineer, former Katikkiro of the Kingdom of Buganda
- John Baptist Wang Jin (1924–2014), Chinese Roman Catholic bishop in Shanxi
- John Baptist Wang Xiaoxun (born 1966), Chinese Roman Catholic bishop in Shaanxi
- John Baptist Wolf (1907–1996), American historian
- John Baptist Wu (1925–2002), bishop of Hong Kong's Catholic church
- John Baptist Yang Xiaoting (born 1964), Chinese Roman Catholic bishop of Yan'an
- John Baptist Ye Ronghua (1931–2022), a Chinese Roman Catholic prelate
- John Baptist Yi Kwang-nyol (c. 1800 – July 20, 1839), Korean Martyr
- John Baptist Nosardy Zino, Vicar Apostolic of Gibraltar

=== Middle name ===
- Robert John Baptist Noel (born 1962), officer of arms at the College of Arms in London

== See also ==
- Antony John Baptist (born 1965), Indian Catholic priest and theologian
