= Baptista (disambiguation) =

Baptista is a Portuguese term meaning Baptist. It may refer to:

- Baptista (surname) Portuguese surname meaning "Baptist"
- Baptista Lake titi, a species of monkey found in Brazil
- Joao Baptista de Ajuda, a city of Benin
- Estádio Lourival Baptista, a stadium in Aracaju, Brazil
- Baptista Miranda, Angolan YouTuber

== See also ==
- Baptiste (disambiguation)
- Battista (Italian surname) Italian term meaning "Baptist"
- Bautista (Spanish surname) Spanish term meaning "Baptist"
- Batista (Portuguese/Spanish surname)
