= Baptist (surname) =

Baptist is a surname. Notable people with this name include:

- Marty Baptist (born 1975), Australian contemporary artist
- Maria Baptist (born 1971), German pianist and composer
- Travis Baptist (born 1971), American baseball player
- Willem Baptist (born 1979), Dutch filmmaker
- George Baptist (1808–1875), Canadian businessman
- Rachael Baptist, Irish singer
- Glenford Baptist, Belizean man
- Edward E. Baptist (born 1970), American historian

== See also ==
- Baptist (disambiguation)
- Baptiste (name)
- Baptista (Portuguese surname) meaning "Baptist"
- Baptistin (French name)
