= Juan Bautista =

Juan Bautista is Spanish for John the Baptist. It is a Spanish given name. It may refer to:

== People ==
- Juan Bautista Pastene (1507–1580), Genoese maritime explorer
- Juan Bautista de Toledo (1515–1567), Spanish architect
- Juan Bautista Pomar (1535–1601), Mexican author
- Juan Bautista Villalpando (1552–1608), Spanish priest, scholar and mathematician
- Juan Bautista (theologian) (1555–unknown), Mexican Franciscan theologian and writer
- Juan Bautista Vázquez the Younger (fl. late 16th to early 17th century), Spanish sculptor
- Juan Bautista Maíno (1581–1649), Spanish baroque painter
- Juan Bautista Comes (1582–1643), Spanish composer
- Juan Bautista Martínez del Mazo (1612–1667), Spanish Baroque artist
- Juan Bautista Diamante (1625–1687), Spanish dramatist
- Juan Bautista Cabanilles (1644–1712), Spanish organist and composer
- Juan Bautista Bayuco (1664–unknown), Spanish painter
- Juan Bautista de Anza I (1693–1740), Spanish explorer
- Juan Bautista Rondeau (1735–1813), Spanish Army officer
- Juan Bautista de Anza (1736–1799), Spanish military officer, expeditionary and politician
- Juan Bautista Muñoz (1745–1799), Spanish philosopher and historian
- Juan Bautista Paz (1772–1844), Argentine jurist and lawyer
- Juan Bautista Sancho (1772–1830), Spanish composer and scholar
- Juan Bautista Arismendi (1775–1841), Venezuelan patriot and general
- Juan Bautista Arriaza (1777–1837), Spanish poet and writer
- Juan Bautista Vitón (1780–1868), Spanish politician, merchant and soldier
- Juan Bautista Alvarado (1809–1882), Californio politician
- Juan Bautista Alberdi (1810–1884), Argentine political theorist and diplomat
- Juan Bautista Ceballos (1811–1859), former interim President of Mexico
- Juan Bautista Cambiaso (1820–1886), Genoese-Dominican explorer, admiral and sailor
- Juan Bautista Topete (1821–1885), Spanish admiral and politician
- Juan Bautista Spotorno (1832–1917), former President of Cuba
- Juan Bautista Cabrera (1837–1916), Spanish poet and theologian
- Juan Bautista Gill (1840–1877), former President of Paraguay
- Juan Bautista Medici (1843–1903), Italian-Argentine engineer
- Juan Bautista Gaona (1845–1932), former provisional President of Paraguay
- Juan Bautista Egusquiza (1845–1902), former President of Paraguay
- Juan Bautista Quirós Segura (1853–1934), former President of Costa Rica
- Juan Bautista Aznar-Cabañas (1860–1933), former Prime Minister of Spain
- Juan Bautista Pérez (1869–1952), former President of Venezuela
- Juan Bautista Vicini Burgos (1871–1935), former President of the Dominican Republic
- Juan Bautista Sacasa (1874–1946), former President of Nicaragua
- Juan Bautista Molina (1882–1958), Argentine military commander and ultranationalist
- Juan Bautista Vargas Arreola (1890–1947), Mexican Brigadier general
- Juan Bautista Bairoletto (1894–1931), Argentine outlaw
- Juan Bautista Gutiérrez (1896–1978), Spanish-Nicaraguan businessman
- Juan Bautista Garcia (1904–1974), Corsican immigrant to Costa Rica
- Juan Bautista Pina (born 1907), Argentine sprinter
- Juan Bautista Besuzzo (1913–1980), Uruguayan footballer
- Juan Bautista Vicini Cabral (1924–2015), Italian-Dominican businessman
- Juan Bautista Villalba (1924–2003), Paraguayan footballer
- Juan Bautista Avalle-Arce (1927–2009), Argentine Hispanist
- Juan Bautista Agüero (1935–2018), Paraguayan footballer
- Juan Bautista Yofre (born 1946), Argentine politician
- Juan Bautista Hernández Pérez (born 1962), Cuban boxer
- Juan Bautista Esquivel (born 1980), Costa Rican footballer
- Juan Bautista Arricau (born 1998), Argentine footballer
- Juan Bautista Torres (born 2002), Argentine tennis player

== Other uses ==
- Juan Bautista Cambiaso (ship), training ship for the Dominican Navy

== See also ==
- Bautista
- Jean-Baptiste
- João Batista (disambiguation)
- San Juan Bautista (disambiguation)
