= Baptist College =

Baptist College may refer to:

- American Baptist College
- Arkansas Baptist College
- Arlington Baptist College
- Baptist College, Kohima
- Baptist College of Florida
- Baptist College of Health Sciences
- Boston Baptist College
- Carey Baptist College
- Central Baptist College
- Charleston Southern University, formed in 1964 as Baptist College
- Fellowship Baptist College
- Geelong Baptist College
- Golden State Baptist College
- Hillsdale Free Will Baptist College
- Irish Baptist College
- Lynchburg Baptist College, now Liberty University
- Midwestern Baptist College
- Piedmont Baptist College
- Regent's Park Baptist College, London
- Saker Baptist College
- Southeastern Baptist College
- Southeastern Free Will Baptist College
- Trinity Baptist College
- Yellowstone Baptist College
- West Coast Baptist College
- Williams Baptist College

== See also ==
- Baptist University (disambiguation)
