= Batiste (surname) =

Batiste is a surname. Notable people with the surname include:

- Alvin Batiste (1932–2007), American jazz clarinetist
- D'Anthony Batiste (born 1982), American footballer
- Édouard Batiste (1820–1876), French composer and organist
- John Batiste (born 1953), United States Army officer
- Jon Batiste (born 1986), American jazz pianist
- Kevin Batiste (born 1966), American baseball player
- Kim Batiste (1968–2020), American baseball player
- Lionel Batiste (1931–2012), American jazz musician
- Michael Batiste (born 1977), American basketball player
- Michael Batiste (born 1970), American footballer
- Russell Batiste Jr. (1965–2023), American funk and R&B drummer
- Spencer Batiste (born 1945), British politician

== See also ==
- Batiste family
- Batiste (disambiguation)
- Batista
