= Boissiere =

Boissiere is an anglicised form of the French name Boissière, which is related to the French word bois, meaning wood. It is part of a number of place names and is a common family name.

== Places ==
- Boissières, Gard, in the Gard département of France
- Boissières, Lot, in the Lot département of France
- Boissière station, a Paris Metro station
- La Grande Boissière is the name of one of the campuses of the International School of Geneva
- Boissiere Village is a village in Trinidad and Tobago

== People ==
- Jean-Baptiste Boissière (1806–1885), a French lexicographer
- Jean Galtier-Boissière (1891–1966), a French writer and journalist who wrote for the Canard enchaîné
- Ralph de Boissière (1907–2008), a Trinidad-born novelist who moved in Australia in 1948

== Other ==
- Boissière (film), a 1937 French film directed by Fernand Rivers

== See also ==
- La Boissière (disambiguation)
