= Baptist Theological Seminary =

Baptist Theological Seminary may refer to:

- Baptist Theological Seminary (India), in Kakinada, Andhra Pradesh, India
- Baptist Theological Seminary at Richmond, in Kansas City, Missouri
- Eastern Baptist Theological Seminary, in New Orleans, Louisiana
- Mid-America Baptist Theological Seminary, in Shelby County, Tennessee
- Midwestern Baptist Theological Seminary, in Kansas City, Missouri
- New Orleans Baptist Theological Seminary, in New Orleans, Louisiana
- Southeastern Baptist Theological Seminary, in Wake Forest, North Carolina
- Southern Baptist Theological Seminary, in Louisville, Kentucky
- Southwestern Baptist Theological Seminary, in Fort Worth, Texas
- Malaysia Baptist Theological Seminary, in Batu Ferringhi, Penang, Malaysia

== See also ==
- Baptist University (disambiguation)
- Central Baptist Theological Seminary (disambiguation)
