= Baptistin =

Baptistin is a French given name and surname. Notable people with this name include:

- Baptistin Baille, professor of optics and acoustics
- Victor-Baptistin Senès, French naval officer and admiral

== See also ==
- Baptist (surname)
- Baptiste (name)
- Baptista (Portuguese surname) meaning "Baptist"
