= Jean-Baptiste =

Jean-Baptiste (French pronunciation: [ʒɑ̃ batist]) is a male French name, originating with Saint John the Baptist, and sometimes shortened to Baptiste. The name may refer to any of the following:

== Persons ==
- Charles XIV John of Sweden, born Jean-Baptiste Jules Bernadotte, was King of Sweden and King of Norway
- Charles-Jean-Baptiste Bouc, businessman and political figure in Lower Canada
- Felix-Jean-Baptiste-Joseph Nève, orientalist and philologist
- Gui-Jean-Baptiste Target, French lawyer and politician
- Hippolyte Jean-Baptiste Garneray, French painter
- Jean Baptiste (grave robber) – A 19th-century gravedigger in Utah, United States, notorious for robbing hundreds of graves, leading to his exile and mysterious disappearance.
- Jean-Baptiste Alphonse Karr, French critic, journalist, and novelist
- Jean-Baptiste Bagaza, chairman of Supreme Revolutionary Council in Burundi until 1976 and president of Burundi (1976-1987)
- Jean-Baptiste Baudry, son of Guillaume Baudry, Canadian gunsmith bevear goldsmith
- Jean-Baptiste Benoît Eyriès, French geographer, author and translator
- Jean-Baptiste Bessières, duke of Istria (1768–1813), Marshal of the Empire
- Jean-Baptiste Bethune, Belgian architect, artisan, and designer who played a pivotal role in the Belgian and Catholic Gothic Revival movement
- Jean-Baptiste Billot, French general and politician
- Jean-Baptiste Biot, French physicist, astronomer and mathematician
- Jean Baptiste Bissot, Sieur de Vincennes, Canadian career man with the colonial regular troops, son of François Byssot de la Rivière
- Jean-Baptiste Boisot, French scholar and abbott
- Jean-Baptiste Boissière, French lexicographer
- Jean-Baptiste Bottex, Haitian painter
- Jean-Baptiste Bouillaud, French physician
- Jean-Baptiste Boussingault, French chemist
- Jean-Baptiste Bréval, French cellist and composer
- Jean Baptiste Brevelle, French trader, explorer and soldier of French Louisiana colony
- Jean-Baptiste-Camille Corot, French landscape painter and printmaker in etching
- Jean-Baptiste Carpeaux, French sculptor and painter
- Jean-Baptiste Chaigneau, French Navy soldier and adventurer who played an important role in the Vietnam War
- Jean Baptiste Charbonneau, son of Sacagawea and her French-Canadian husband Toussaint Charbonneau
- Jean-Baptiste Charcot, French scientist, medical doctor and polar scientist
- Jean-Baptiste-Charles-Joseph Bélanger, French applied mathematician who worked in the areas of hydraulics and hydrodynamics
- Jean-Baptiste-Claude Odiot, French silversmith working in a neoclassical style
- Jean-Baptiste Cléry, (1759–1809), the personal valet to King Louis XVI
- Jean-Baptiste Colbert, French minister of finance from 1665 to 1683 under the rule of King Louis XIV
- Jean-Baptiste Colbert, Marquis de Seignelay, French politician
- Jean-Baptiste Colbert, Marquess of Torcy, French diplomat, who negotiated some most important treaties towards end of reign of Louis XIV
- Jean-Baptiste Couillard Dupuis, farmer, merchant, and political figure in Quebec
- Jean-Baptiste de La Croix de Chevrières de Saint-Vallier, appointed to the see of Quebec as bishop by Louis XIV
- Jean-Baptiste de La Salle, French priest, educational reformer, and saint in the Roman Catholic Church
- Jean-Baptiste de Nompère de Champagny, 1st Duc de Cadore, French admiral and politician
- Jean-Baptiste de Voglie, eminent Italian road and bridge engineer
- Jean-Baptiste Denys, French physician notable for having performed the first fully documented human blood transfusion
- Jean-Baptiste Dominique Rusca, medical doctor who advocated the cause of the French Revolution
- Jean-Baptiste Donatien de Vimeur, comte de Rochambeau
- Jean-Baptiste Du Tertre, French blackfriar and botanist
- Jean-Baptiste Dumas, French chemist, best known for his works on organic analysis and synthesis
- Jean-Baptiste-Édouard Gélineau, French physician who first described narcolepsy
- Jean-Baptiste Faure, French operatic baritone and art collector who also composed several classical songs
- Jean-Baptiste Ferré, miller and political figure in Lower Canada
- Jean-Baptiste Forqueray, son of Antoine Forqueray, player of the viol and a composer
- Jean-Baptiste François des Marets, marquis de Maillebois, Marshal of France
- Jean-Baptiste Girard (pedagogue) (1765–1850), Swiss Franciscan educator
- Jean-Baptiste Girard (soldier) (1775–1815), French soldier of the Napoleonic Wars
- Jean-Baptiste Girard (priest) (1680–1733), a priest tried for witchcraft, abuse, and corruption of Catherine Cadière
- Jean-Baptiste Giraud, French sculptor
- Jean-Baptiste Guégan, French singer
- Jean-Baptiste Godart, French entomologist
- Jean-Baptiste Grange, French alpine skier
- Jean-Baptiste Grenouille, protagonist of the 1985 novel Perfume by German writer Patrick Süskind
- Jean-Baptiste Greuze, French painter
- Jean-Baptiste Guimet, French industrial chemist
- Jean-Baptiste Guth, French portrait artist
- Jean-Baptiste-Henri Deshays, French painter of religious and mythological subjects
- Jean-Baptiste Henri Lacordaire, French ecclesiastic, preacher, journalist, and political activist
- Jean-Baptiste Janssens, twenty-seventh Superior General of the Society of Jesus (Jesuits)
- Jean-Baptiste Joseph Fourier, French mathematician and physicist best known for initiating the investigation of Fourier series
- Jean-Baptiste Jourdan (1762–1833), Marshal of France
- Jean-Baptiste Kléber, French general during the French Revolutionary Wars
- Jean-Baptiste Lamarck, French naturalist
- Jean-Baptiste Lamy, French Catholic clergyman and first Archbishop of Santa Fe, New Mexico, United States of America
- Jean-Baptiste Landé (died 1748), founder of the Mariinsky Ballet based in Saint Petersburg, Russia
- Jean-Baptiste Le Moyne, Sieur de Bienville, colonizer and repeated governor of French Louisiana
- Jean-Baptiste Lepère, French architect
- Jean Baptiste Loeillet of Ghent, Belgian composer
- Jean-Baptiste Loeillet of London, Flemish baroque composer and performer on the recorder, flute, oboe, and harpsichord
- Jean-Baptiste-Louis Franquelin, cartographer, a royal hydrographer, and a teacher of navigation
- Jean-Baptiste-Louis Gresset, French poet and dramatist, best known for his poem "Vert-Vert"
- Jean-Baptiste Lully, Italian-born French composer
- Jean-Baptiste Antoine Marcellin Marbot, French general during the Napoleonic Wars
- Jean-Baptiste Maunier (born 1990), French child actor
- Jean-Baptiste Massillon, French churchman and preacher
- Jean-Baptiste Meilleur, doctor, educator and political figure in Lower Canada
- Jean-Baptiste Michonis, personality of the French Revolution
- Jean-Baptiste Mondino, French fashion photographer and music video director
- Jean-Baptiste Morin (mathematician), French mathematician, astrologer, and astronomer
- Jean-Baptiste Morin (composer), French composer
- Jean-Baptiste Ngo Dinh Diem, South Vietnamese president
- Jean-Baptiste Nolin, French cartographer and engraver
- Jean-Baptiste Oudry, French Rococo painter, engraver, and tapestry designer
- Jean-Baptiste Ouédraogo, President of Upper Volta (now Burkina Faso) from 8 November 1982 to 4 August 1983
- Jean-Baptiste Pastré (1804-1877), a French banker and arms-dealer.
- Jean Baptiste Paul (1896-1966), Canadian First Nations wrestler
- Jean-Baptiste Peyras-Loustalet, French rugby union player
- Jean-Baptiste Pigalle, French sculptor
- Jean-Baptiste Pitois, French writer on the occult
- Jean Baptiste Point du Sable, first settler in Chicago
- Jean-Baptiste Poquelin (1622–1673), known by his stage name Molière, Classical French playwright, actor and stage manager
- Jean-Baptiste Raymond, seigneur, businessman, and political figure in Lower Canada
- Jean-Baptiste Régis, French Jesuit missionary in imperial China
- Jean-Baptiste Regnault, French painter
- Jean-Baptiste Renaud, prominent businessman, merchant, and land owner in Quebec
- Jean-Baptiste-René Hertel de Rouville, seigneur and political figure in Lower Canada
- Jean-Baptiste Robert Lindet, French politician of the Revolutionary period
- Jean-Baptiste Rousseau, French poet
- Jean-Baptiste Salpointe, first Bishop of Arizona and the second Archbishop of Santa Fe, New Mexico
- Jean-Baptiste Sanson de Pongerville, French man of letters and poet
- Jean-Baptiste Senaillé, French-born Baroque composer and violinist
- Jean-Baptiste Say, French economist and businessman
- Jean-Baptiste-Siméon Chardin, French painter
- Jean-Baptiste Singelée, Belgian classical composer and violinist
- Jean-Baptiste Tavernier, French traveler and pioneer of trade with India
- Jean-Baptiste Vaquette de Gribeauval, French artillery officer and engineer
- Jean Baptiste Vermay, French-born Cuban artist and educator
- Jean-Baptiste Vuillaume, French luthier
- Jean Baptiste Wilkie (1803-1886), former chief of the Métis tribe near Pembina, North Dakota
- Jean-Pierre-André Amar, also known as Jean-Baptiste-André Amar, French political figure of the Revolution
- Joseph-Jean-Baptiste Gosselin, merchant and political figure in Quebec
- P. Jean-Baptiste Bradel, French draughtsman and engraver
- Phạm Minh Mẫn, short for Jean-Baptiste Phạm Minh Mẫn (Vietnamese: Gioan Baotixia Phạm Minh Mẫn), Catholic cardinal priest and archbishop of Ho Chi Minh City

=== Surnames ===
- Henry Jean-Baptiste, French politician born in Martinique, MP for Mayotte
- Jeremiah Jean-Baptiste (born 2001), American football player
- Lucien Jean-Baptiste, French actor and film director born in Martinique
- Marianne Jean-Baptiste, British actress and singer of Antiguan and Saint Lucian heritage

=== Fictional persons ===
- Jean-Baptiste Clamence, Fictional character from Albert Camus's The Fall
- Jean-Baptiste Emanuel Zorg, a character in the film The Fifth Element
- Jean-Baptiste Augustine, a character in the videogame Overwatch

== See also ==
- Baptiste (disambiguation)
- Batiste (disambiguation)
- João Batista (disambiguation)
- Juan Bautista (disambiguation)
- Saint-Jean-Baptiste (disambiguation)
