= Batiste family =

The Batiste family of New Orleans includes twenty-five or more musicians, including:

- Alvin Batiste (1932–2007), American jazz clarinetist
- Harold Battiste (1931–2015), composer and arranger
- Lionel Batiste (1931–2012), American jazz musician
- Russell Batiste Jr. (1965–2023), American drummer
- Michael Batiste, bassist
- Jon (Jonathan) Batiste (born 1986), American jazz pianist
- Jamal Batiste
- David Batiste
- Damon Batiste

[Jon] Batiste has been in the zone since before he was born. He comes from a long line of New Orleans musicians, including his father, Michael, a bassist who performed with Jackie Wilson and Isaac Hayes on the "Chitlin' Circuit" in the ’60s and ’70s. His dad also co-founded the Batiste Brothers Band: seven brothers who played R&B, soul, funk and New Orleans music. He says his father was his first mentor, as was Alvin Batiste, the late clarinetist, “who taught everyone from New Orleans music over the last 40 years.”

Jean Batiste was born in Metairie, Louisiana, and moved to New York City, where he met Estella. Jean and Estelle moved to New Orleans and were owners of a grocery store and a hardware store in the 9th Ward of New Orleans. Their grandchildren include Jon Batiste (born 1986), jazz pianist; and Russell Batiste Jr. (born 1965), drummer "who played with The Funky Meters." Other family members include Lionel Batiste of the Treme Brass Band, Milton Batiste of the Olympia Brass Band, and composer and arranger Harold Battiste.

== See also ==
- Batiste (disambiguation)
- Batista
