= 31st federal electoral district of the State of Mexico =

Federal electoral district of Mexico

State of Mexico's 31st
- Electoral district of the Chamber of Deputies of Mexico

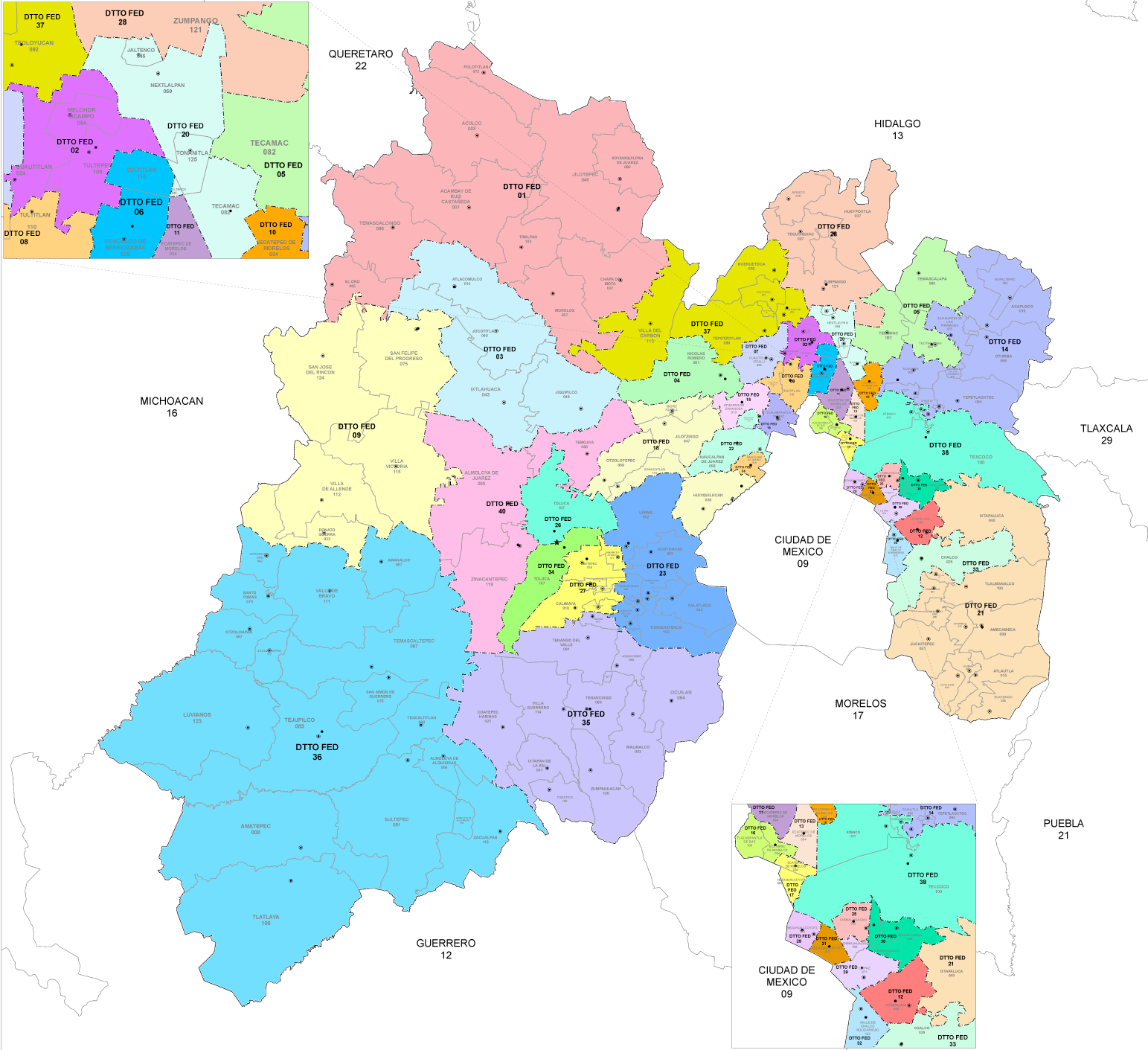
- State of Mexico's districts since 2023

Incumbent
- Member: Juan Ángel Bautista Bravo
- Party: ▌Morena
- Congress: 66th (2024–2027)

District
- State: State of Mexico
- Head town: Ciudad Nezahualcóyotl
- Coordinates: 19°24′N 99°01′W
- Covers: Nezahualcóyotl (part)
- PR region: Fifth
- Precincts: 274
- Population: 437,480 (2020 census)

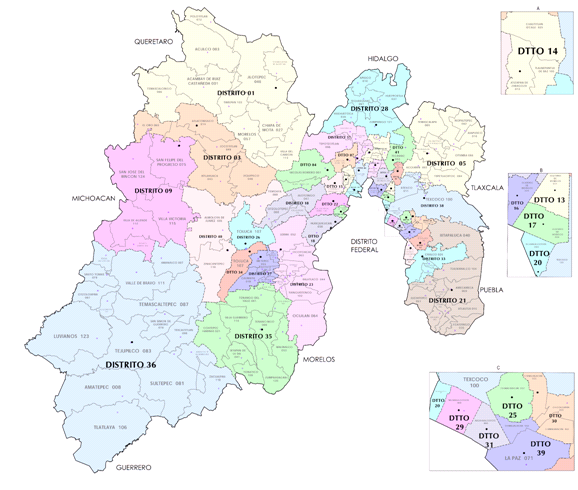
2017–2022 districting scheme

The 31st federal electoral district of the State of Mexico (Spanish: Distrito electoral federal 31 del Estado de México) is one of the 300 electoral districts into which Mexico is divided for elections to the federal Chamber of Deputies and one of 40 such districts in the State of Mexico.

It elects one deputy to the lower house of Congress for each three-year legislative session by means of the first-past-the-post system. Votes cast in the district also count towards the calculation of proportional representation ("plurinominal") deputies elected from the fifth region.

The 31st district was created by the 1977 electoral reforms, which increased the number of single-member seats in the Chamber of Deputies from 196 to 300. Under that plan, the State of Mexico's seat allocation rose from 15 to 34. The new districts were first contended in the 1979 mid-term election.

The current member for the district, re-elected in the 2024 general election, is Juan Ángel Bautista Bravo of the National Regeneration Movement (Morena).

== District territory ==
Under the 2023 districting plan adopted by the National Electoral Institute (INE), which is to be used for the 2024, 2027 and 2030 federal elections, the 31st district is located in the east of the Greater Mexico City urban area and covers 274 electoral precincts (secciones electorales) across a portion of one of the state's 125 municipalities:

- Nezahualcóyotl (south-eastern parts). (Note: Districts 17 and 29 cover the remainder of the municipality.)

The head town (cabecera distrital), where results from individual polling stations are gathered together and tallied, is Ciudad Nezahualcóyotl. In the 2020 census, the district reported a total population of 437,480.

== Previous districting schemes ==
Evolution of electoral district numbers
	1974	1978	1996	2005	2017	2023
State of Mexico	15	34	36	40	41	40
Chamber of Deputies	196	300				

Under the previous districting plans enacted by the INE and its predecessors, the 31st district was situated as follows:

2017–2022

South-eastern parts of the municipality of Nezahualcóyotl.

2005–2017

South-eastern parts of Nezahualcóyotl.

1996–2005

South-eastern parts of Nezahualcóyotl.

1978–1996

A portion of the municipality of Ecatepec.

== Deputies returned to Congress ==
(Mexico) National parties
- Current
- PAN
- PRI
- PT
- PVEM
- MC
- Morena
- PAZ
- Somos
- Defunct or local only
- PLM
- PNR
- PRM
- PNM
- PP
- PPS
- PARM
- PFCRN
- CON
- PANAL
- PSD
- PES
- PES
- PRD

State of Mexico's 30th district
Election	Deputy	Party	Term	Legislature
1979	Héctor Moreno Toscano	Institutional Revolutionary Party	1979–1982	51st Congress
1982	Enrique Riva Palacio Galicia	Institutional Revolutionary Party	1982–1985	52nd Congress
1985	José Encarnación Alfaro Cázares	Institutional Revolutionary Party	1985–1988	53rd Congress
1988	Cuauhtémoc de Anda Gutiérrez	Institutional Revolutionary Party	1988–1991	54th Congress
1991	Juan Adrián Ramírez García	Institutional Revolutionary Party	1991–1994	55th Congress
1994	Mario Enrique Vázquez Hernández	Institutional Revolutionary Party	1994–1997	56th Congress
1997	Antonio Cabello Sánchez	Party of the Democratic Revolution	1997–2000	57th Congress
2000	Rodrigo Carrillo Pérez (Note: Carrillo Pérez died in office on 19 October 2002. Antunes Flores, his alternate, was sworn in on 14 December 2002.); Zeferino Antunes Flores	Party of the Democratic Revolution	2002–2003; 2002–2003	58th Congress
2003	Héctor Miguel Bautista López	Party of the Democratic Revolution	2003–2006	59th Congress
2006	Juan Hugo de la Rosa García	Party of the Democratic Revolution	2006–2009	60th Congress
2009	Germán Osvaldo Cortez Sandoval (Note: Cortez Sandoval died in office on 9 June 2010. Soria Morales, his alternate, was sworn in on 31 August 2010.); Blanca Juana Soria Morales	Institutional Revolutionary Party	2009–2010; 2010–2012	61st Congress
2012	Víctor Manuel Bautista López	Party of the Democratic Revolution	2012–2015	62nd Congress
2015	Armando Soto Espino	Party of the Democratic Revolution	2015–2018	63rd Congress
2018	Juan Ángel Bautista Bravo	National Regeneration Movement	2018–2021	64th Congress
2021	Juan Ángel Bautista Bravo	National Regeneration Movement	2021–2024	65th Congress
2024	Juan Ángel Bautista Bravo	National Regeneration Movement	2024–2027	66th Congress

== Presidential elections ==
State of Mexico's 31st district
Election	District won by	Party or coalition	%
2018	Andrés Manuel López Obrador	Juntos Haremos Historia	59.5211
2024	Claudia Sheinbaum Pardo	Sigamos Haciendo Historia	65.8135
