= Zeferino Antunes Flores =

Mexican politician

- Born: State of Mexico, Mexico
- Occupation: Politician
- Political party: PRD

Zeferino Antunes Flores is a Mexican politician from the Party of the Democratic Revolution (PRD).

From 2002 to 2003 he served in the Chamber of Deputies to represent the State of Mexico's 31st district as the alternate of Rodrigo Carrillo Pérez, who died in office on 19 October 2002.
