= Blanca Soria Morales =

Mexican politician

- Born: 17 May 1975 (age 51); State of Mexico, Mexico
- Occupation: Politician
- Political party: PRI

Blanca Juana Soria Morales (born 17 May 1975) is a Mexican politician from the Institutional Revolutionary Party. From 2010 to 2012 she served in the Chamber of Deputies to represent the State of Mexico's 31st district as the alternate of Germán Cortez Sandoval, who had died in office on 9 June 2010.
