= Baptista =

Baptista is a Portuguese surname.

People with this name include:

- Alba Baptista (born 1997)
- Alexandre Baptista (1941–2024), Portuguese footballer
- Ana Filipa Baptista (born 1990), Portuguese chess player
- António Maria Baptista (1866–1920), Portuguese military officer and politician
- Arnaldo Baptista (born 1948), Brazilian rock musician
- Baptista Mantuanus (1447–1516), Italian Carmelite reformer, humanist, and poet
- Baptista Minola, a character in Shakespeare's Taming Of The Shrew
- Baptista Varani (1458–1527), Italian nun and Catholic saint
- Christopher Baptista, Canadian drag queen
- Cyro Baptista (born 1950), Brazilian musician
- Dalton Holland Baptista (born 1962), Brazilian botanist
- Eduardo Baptista (born 1970), Brazilian football manager
- Ezequiel Baptista (born 1926), Portuguese footballer
- Douglas Baptista, Brazilian serial killer
- Felipe Oliveira Baptista (born 1975), Portuguese fashion designer
- Firmino Baptista, Portuguese athlete
- Hélder Baptista (born 1972), Portuguese footballer
- Joao Luiz Ferreira Baptista (born 1971), Brazilian footballer
- Jorge Carlos Santos Moreira Baptista (born 1977), Portuguese footballer
- Joseph Baptista (1864–1930), Indian-freedom activist known as Kaka Baptista
- Juan Alfonso Baptista (born 1976), Venezuelan actor and model
- Júlio Baptista (born 1981), Brazilian footballer
- Mariano Baptista (1832–1907), President of Bolivia
- Mawete João Baptista, Angolan ambassador
- Miguel Baptista (born 1993) Portuguese footballer
- Nelsinho Baptista (born 1950), Brazilian football player and manager
- Pedro Ernesto Baptista (fl. 1931–1936), Brazilian surgeon and politician
- Rodrigo Baptista (born 1996), Brazilian racing driver
- Serafim Baptista (1925–2001), Portuguese footballer
- Silverio Pinto Baptista (born 1969), East Timorese ombudsman
- Vítor Baptista (1948–1999), Portuguese footballer

== See also ==
- Baptist (surname)
- Baptiste (name) (French surname and given name) French term meaning "Baptist"
- Battista (Italian surname) Italian term meaning "Baptist"
- Bautista (Spanish surname) Spanish term meaning "Baptist"
- Batista (Portuguese/Spanish surname)
