= Rodrigo Carrillo Pérez =

Mexican politician

- Born: 4 February 1964; Mexico City, Mexico
- Died: 19 October 2002 (aged 38); Mexico City, Mexico
- Occupation: Politician
- Political party: PRD

Rodrigo Carrillo Pérez (4 February 1964 – 19 October 2002) was a Mexican politician from the Party of the Democratic Revolution (PRD).

In the 2000 general election he was elected to the Chamber of Deputies to represent the State of Mexico's 31st district during the 58th session of Congress.

He died in office on 19 October 2002 and was replaced for the remainder of his term by his alternate, Zeferino Antunes Flores.
