= Late (Alvin Batiste album) =

Studio album by Alvin Batiste
- Released: 1993
- Genre: Jazz
- Label: Columbia
- Producer: Alvin Batiste

Alvin Batiste chronology
Bayou Magic (1988)	Late (1993)	Songs, Words and Messages, Connections (1999)

Late is an album by the American clarinetist Alvin Batiste, released in 1993. Issued as part of Columbia Records' "Legendary Pioneers of Jazz" series, it was Batiste's first album for a major label.

== Production ==
The album was produced by Batiste. He led Kenny Barron on piano, Rufus Reid on bass, and Herman Jackson on drums. Batiste wrote six of the album's eight songs. "Banjo Noir" was inspired by a Creole folk song from the 1800s. "Ray's Segue" is based on a melody that Ray Charles would play. "Imp and Perry" is based on John Coltrane's "Countdown". Wessell Anderson played saxophone on "Body and Soul".

== Critical reception ==
Professional ratings
Review scores
Source	Rating
AllMusic	3/5 stars
Chicago Sun-Times	4/4 stars
The Encyclopedia of Popular Music	3/5 stars
MusicHound Jazz: The Essential Album Guide	4.5/5 stars
The Philadelphia Inquirer	3/4 stars

The Philadelphia Inquirer wrote: "Always light and elegant, Batiste weaves delicate, diaphanous strands on the title track and manages a street sensibility coupled with a highbrow complexity on 'Bat's Blues'." The Chicago Tribune stated that "Batiste adds an alert technique and an intense, compositional approach to improvisation." The Chicago Sun-Times wrote that "notes curl like liquid smoke from his blues treatments."

The Times-Picayune stated that "Batiste's round, mellow tone alternates with tweaking arpeggios, gruff growls and jittering chromatics." The New York Times listed Late among 1993's best jazz albums, noting that it moves "from absolutely cool late night atmospherics, to the experimental, and it always swings."

AllMusic wrote that Batiste "has a conventional and pleasing tone that he utilizes to improvise in an unusual and harmonically advanced style."

== Track listing ==
No.	Title	Length
1.	"Late"
2.	"Imp and Perry"
3.	"Bat's Blues"
4.	"Body and Soul"
5.	"Banjo Noir"
6.	"Ray's Segue"
7.	"When the Saints"
8.	"Kinshasa"
