= Bautista =

Bautista (Spanish for "baptist") is a Spanish language name. It may be used either as a surname or as a given name, often in reference to John the Baptist. Notable people with this name include:

== Given name ==
- Bautista Álvarez (1933–2017), Spanish Galician nationalist politician and historian
- Bautista Ezcurra (born 1995), Argentine rugby union player
- Bautista Delguy (born 1997), Argentine rugby union player
- Bautista Garcet (1899–1936), Spanish trade unionist and politician
- Bautista Güemes (born 1990), Argentine rugby union player
- Bautista Heguy (born 1970), Argentine polo player
- Bautista Kociubinski (born 2001), Argentine footballer
- Bautista Mascia (born 1996), Uruguayan musician
- Bautista Merlini (born 1995), Argentine footballer
- Bautista Ortiz de Urbina (born 1985), Argentine polo player
- Bautista Remiro de Navarra, Spanish 17th-century writer
- Bautista Saubidet Birkner (born 1995), Argentine sailor
- Bautista Saavedra (1870–1939), Bolivian politician, President of the Republic 1921–1925

== Surname ==
- Adolfo Bautista (born 1979), Mexican footballer
- Alba Bautista (born 2002), Spanish rhythmic gymnast
- Alberto Bautista Gómez, Mexican potter
- Álvaro Bautista (born 1984), Spanish motorcyclist
- Andres Bautista, Filipino lawyer
- Antonio Bautista (1937–1974), Philippine Air Force pilot
- Arianne Bautista (born 1993), Filipino actress and model
- Aring Bautista, Filipino actress
- Augusto Bautista, Filipino basketball player
- Aurora Bautista (1925–2012), Spanish actress
- Bella Bautista, American beauty pageant titleholder and transgender rights activist
- Boyet Bautista (born 1981), Filipino basketball player
- Buda Bautista (born 1973), Filipino women's footballer and manager
- Cacai Bautista (born 1978), Filipino actress and comedian
- Cipriano Bautista (died 2000), Filipino politician
- Cirilo Bautista (1941–2018), Filipino poet and writer
- Christian Bautista (born 1981), Filipino singer, actor, host and model
- Christian Javier Bautista (born 1987), Salvadoran footballer
- Daniel Bautista (born 1952), Mexican racewalker
- Daniel Bautista Pina (born 1981), Spanish footballer
- Danny Bautista (born 1972), Dominican Republic baseball player
- Dave Bautista (born 1969), American professional wrestler and actor better known under the ring name Batista
- Denny Bautista (born 1980), Dominican Republic baseball player
- Diana Bautista, American neuroscientist
- Diego Bautista Urbaneja (1782–1856), Venezuelan politician
- Emilio Bautista (1898–1977), Spanish boxer
- Emmanuel T. Bautista (born 1958), Filipino general
- Enrique Bautista (1934–2005), Filipino sprinter
- Félix Bautista (born 1963), Dominican Republic politician
- Félix Bautista (born 1995), Dominican baseball player
- Francisco Bautista (born 1972), Mexican long-distance runner
- Francisco 'Paco' Bautista (born 1971), Spanish bodybuilder
- Franklin Bautista (born 1952), Filipino politician
- Gloria Bautista Cuevas (born 1953), Mexican politician
- Guadalupe Bautista (born 1988), Mexican professional boxer
- Harlene Bautista, Filipino actress
- Harvey Bautista (born 2003), Filipino actor
- Herbert Bautista (born 1968), Filipino actor and politician
- Hermes Bautista (born 1986), Filipino-American actor
- Herminio Bautista (1940–2017), Filipino actor
- Jayann Bautista (born 1986), Filipino singer
- Jerónimo Bautista Lanuza (1533–1624), Spanish Dominican friar, bishop and writer
- Jon Bautista (born 1995), Spanish footballer
- José Bautista (pitcher) (born 1964), Major League Baseball pitcher
- José Bautista (born 1980), Major League Baseball right fielder and third baseman
- José Fernando Bautista Quintero (1963–2024), Colombian lawyer and politician
- Julián Bautista (1901–1961), Spanish composer and conductor
- Leanne Bautista (born 2010), Filipino child actress
- Lualhati Bautista (1945–2023), Filipino writer
- Maey Bautista (born 1972), Filipino journalist, actress and comedian
- Marcelina Bautista (born 1966), Mexican human rights activist
- Margarito Bautista (1878–1961), Nahua-Mexican missionary, theologian and religious founder
- Mark Bautista (born 1983), Filipino singer and actor
- Perla Bautista (born 1940), Filipino actress
- Rafael Bautista (born 1965), Mexican footballer and manager
- Rafael Bautista (baseball) (born 1993), Dominican Republic baseball player
- Ramon Bautista (born 1986), Filipino actor and comedian
- Reynaldo Bautista (born 1986), Filipino professional boxer
- Roberto Bautista Agut (born 1988), Spanish tennis player
- Roland Bautista (1951–2012), American musician
- Sheree Bautista, Filipino actress, dancer and model
- Víctor Manuel Bautista López (born 1947), Mexican politician
- Yudelkys Bautista (born 1974), Dominican Republic volleyball player

== See also ==
- Baptista (Portuguese surname and given name) meaning "Baptist"
- Baptiste (French name) meaning "Baptist"
- Batista (Portuguese/Spanish surname)
- Battista (Italian surname and given name) meaning "Baptist"
