= Germán Cortez Sandoval =

Mexican politician (1954–2010)

- Born: 20 April 1954; State of Mexico, Mexico
- Died: 9 June 2010 (aged 56)
- Occupation: Politician
- Political party: PRI

Germán Osvaldo Cortez Sandoval (20 April 1954 – 9 June 2010) was a Mexican politician from the Institutional Revolutionary Party (PRI). In the 2003 mid-terms he was elected to the Chamber of Deputies to represent the State of Mexico's 31st district during the 61st session of Congress.

Cortez died on 9 June 2010 due to a heart attack. He was replaced for the rest of his term by his alternate, Blanca Juana Soria Morales.
