= Batista =

Batista is a Spanish or Portuguese surname. Notable persons with the name include:

- Batista (footballer, born 1955), Brazilian football player João Batista da Silva
- Batista (wrestler) (Dave Bautista, born 1969), American actor and professional wrestler
- Edina Alves Batista, Brazilian football referee
- Eike Batista, Brazilian mining businessman
- Emanuel Herrera Batista, Dominican rapper known by his stage name as El Alfa
- Felix Batista, American security expert who was kidnapped in 2008
- Fernando Batista, Argentine football manager and retired player
- Fulgencio Batista (1901–1973), Cuban general, president, and dictator
- Miguel Batista, Dominican baseball player
- Pascual Batista, Argentine rower
- Randas Batista, Brazilian medical doctor and cardiac surgeon
- Sergio Batista, Argentine football player and coach
- Tony Batista, Dominican baseball player
- Wesley Batista (born 1972), Brazilian billionaire businessman
- William Batista (footballer), Brazilian footballer
- William Batista (football manager), Brazilian football coach

Fictional characters

- Angel Batista, a character in Dexter
- Batista Hoshi, a character in Choujin X

== See also ==
- Batiste (disambiguation)
- Baptiste (disambiguation)
- Baptista (disambiguation)
- Baptist (disambiguation)
- Batista (grape), Spanish name for the French wine grape Canari noir
- Batista procedure, a surgical operation
- Batiste (surname)
- Battista
- Bautista
