= Chanel College (Geelong) =

Private school in Victoria, Australia

Coordinates: 38°4′0″S 144°19′45″E

Information
- Religious affiliation: Catholicism
- Established: 1958
- Founders: The Marist Fathers
- Closed: 1999
- Gender: Boys

Chanel College was a Roman Catholic school for boys in Geelong, Victoria, Australia. The school was founded in 1958 by the Marist Fathers. Originally a day school, the school became a boarding school in 1962 with enrolment peaking in 1966. The Marists encouraged independent thinking and resourcefulness.

At the end of 1970, the Marist Fathers withdrew from teaching at the school and the Christian Brothers took over the running of the College. The Christian Brothers announced decision to close the college in February 1998, and the school closed at the end of 1999. The site was later purchased by the Geelong Baptist College.

== History ==
The school was founded in 1958 by the Marist Fathers, and established on the site of what is now Pettitt Park, in the Geelong suburb of Bell Post Hill.

The school's founding rector was Father Stanley Hosie SM, MA, STL. Originally a school for day boys, from the start of 1962, the school took in boarders from Australia and Malaysia (notably Robert Tan and Matthew Chee). Whilst day students were still enrolled, the focus of the school was on boarding students.

In mid 1963, the school relocated to a newly-built complex at Lovely Banks, near Geelong, under the guidance and direction of the schools' second rector, Stephen Maloney SM, BA, MACE. Maloney was a very highly regarded and respected teacher at the school.

The Bell Post Hill site ("Old Chanel") became a boarding house for the junior boarders. The senior boarders were housed in two boarding houses at Lovely Banks: Braemar, named after the original Lovely Banks property, and Futuna, named after the Island on which Peter Chanel met his death.

By 1966 enrolments totalled 446 students, but enrolments started to fall after that year. By 1970, about 395 students were at Chanel.

=== Withdrawal of the Marists ===
The Marist Fathers withdrew from teaching at the school at the end of 1970. The reasons given were a shortage of priests, and the need to provide more Marists for the missions. However, a book published by the Marists in 1990 (SM Down Under, page 45) blamed financial problems, as well as a shortage of priests, for the withdrawal of the Marists from Chanel. The rector's report in the 1970 issue of The Sword also mentioned finances, specifically Federal and State government grants, as a key reason for the Marist withdrawal from Chanel.

The then rector, Fr Guiren, had the unenviable task of announcing and overseeing the withdrawal of the Marists from Chanel. The move was announced to students and parents at the annual play night on 23 June 1970 at the Corio Centenary Hall. An 'Action Group' of parents, lay teachers and other supporters sprang into action in an attempt to save Chanel. The group held about three public meetings at the school, as well as lobbying hard and pursuing other options.

=== Oversight by the Christian Brothers ===
After some negotiations the Christian Brothers took over the running of the College. That change resulted in the discontinuation of the boarding section of the school. The first Christian Brother principal of Chanel was David Carey, BA (Melb), MACE, a highly regarded and respected teacher. Over the next few years, the Christian Brothers embarked on a major building program at Chanel, replacing the temporary buildings known as The Huts, which were a feature at Chanel for a number of years.

In 2015, a former Christian Brother was jailed for offences against vulnerable boys during the 1970s and 1980s at a number of schools including Chanel College.

== Activities ==
The Marists encouraged independent thinking and resourcefulness in their students. To this end, the school magazine "Champion" (Chanel Monthly Publication) was commenced in 1965. It was produced completely from student copy, and was also edited by the students. Controversial content was included, such as comment on the need for the celebration of ANZAC day, a topic often discussed in the broader community at the time, as well as student submissions including poetry and essays, satire, scientific discourse and so on. The school established an innovative and effective SRC in the early years. Throughout the early and mid 1960s, students learned valuable lessons from the SRC, but it was less successful from about 1968. The Marists expected much of students elected to the SRC, but these students were given little training in leadership and in many cases little or no encouragement. Many former students of the time would argue that the SRC at Chanel was largely ineffective, with time-consuming class meetings.

Unique for schools in Australia at the time, Chanel established a Science Club in 1964, to encourage students to become interested in science. The club met weekly and students gave presentations on various scientific subjects, or viewed and discussed films of a scientific nature. From time to time external guest speakers were invited to address the club. An annual feature of the club was the science exhibition, which showcased the study of science at Chanel. The Science Club also sponsored end of term excursions to such places as Perth, Cairns, Woomera, Tasmania and the Snowy Mountains.

In order to encourage and improve public speaking amongst the students, an annual public speaking competition was established. All students had to give a short speech in front of their class. The speech was assessed and the best three speakers gave their speech in front of the whole school. In 1968, at the suggestion of students, a teacher of speechcraft and voice production was employed to further improve the standard of public speaking in the school.

== Closure ==
The closure of Chanel College was not without controversy. It was stated that the opening of new schools in the region had led to falling enrolments, and that refurbishment was required to a number of buildings. However, there was evidence to suggest there had been an increases in enrolments in the years before the closure. This led to a popular belief by students and parents that there were other motives for the sale of the college. The Christian Brothers announced decision to close Chanel on Wednesday, 18 February 1998, and the school closed at the end of 1999.

The site was later sold and reopened as Geelong Baptist College.

Material relating to the college dating to 1975 is held by the Geelong Library and Heritage Centre.
