= Baptism (disambiguation) =

Baptism is a rite of admission into the Christian church.

Baptism may also refer to:

== Religion ==
- Affusion, a method of baptism where water is poured on the head of the person being baptized
- Aspersion, the act of sprinkling with water, especially holy water
- Amrit Sanchar, the Sikh ceremony of initiation or baptism
- Believer's baptism, the Christian practice of baptism as this is understood by many Protestant churches,
- Baptism of Jesus, event marking the beginning of his public ministry
- Baptism for the dead, today commonly refers to the religious practice of baptizing a person on behalf of one who is dead
- Baptism with the Holy Spirit, a term describing baptism (washing or immersion) in or with the Spirit of God
- Baptism (Mormonism), the first of several ordinances
- Immersion baptism, a method of baptism where the person baptized is immersed
- Infant baptism, the practice of baptising infants or young children

== Music and poetry ==
- Baptism (band), a Finnish black metal band

=== Albums ===
- Baptism (Laibach album), 1987
- Baptism (Lenny Kravitz album) or the song "Baptized", 2004
- Baptism (Stefano Battaglia album) or the title song, 1993
- Baptism: A Journey Through Our Time, by Joan Baez, 1969
- Baptize (album) or the title song, by Atreyu, 2021
- Baptized (album) or the title song, by Daughtry, 2013
- Baptizing (album), by the Seldom Scene, 1978

=== Songs ===
- "Baptism" (Crystal Castles song), 2010
- "Baptism" (Kenny Chesney and Randy Travis song), 1999
- "Baptize", a song by Spillage Village from Spilligion, 2020
- "Baptism", a song by Lovejoy from One Simple Trick, 2025

== Other ==
- Baptism (novel), a 2012 novel by Max Kinnings
- "Baptism" (Pure), a 2017 television episode
- "The Baptism" (Big Love), a 2006 television episode
- Baptism by fire, a phrase originating from the words of John the Baptist in Matthew 3:11

== See also ==
- Baptists
- John the Baptist (c. 0 BC – c. 30 AD)
- Baptistery
- Baptismal font
- Khalsa
- Baptism, Eucharist and Ministry
- Baptist (disambiguation)
