= Osman Tisani =

Osman Tisani (1887–1920) was an African expatriate, who became the first known person of African origin to speak the Irish of the Galway Gaeltacht.

== Biography ==
There is little detail known about Tisani's early life, but there are three theories. One is that he was a son of an African chief who was exchanged during the Second Anglo-Boer War for the son of Marcus Óg Lynch of Barna House, County Galway, who was serving in the British army. Another is that he was the son of a servant, with his place of birth being recorded as "Tumtutu / French coast Africa" in 1885, or in "Timbuctoo" (Timbuktu) in 1889. Lynch's son died during the war, and by some means, Tisani came to live in Barna as early as 1905, when Lynch built a handball alley in the village for his amusement. Another is that he was the son of Captain Nicholas Lynch, son of Marcus og who served in the British army in West Africa and had a child with an African woman before going to South Africa and fighting in the Boer war. Lynch's only other children, three sisters, were all members of the Sisters of Charity, while his own sister, Miss Lilly, lived with him.

Tisani is notable for becoming fluent in Irish, making him the first known person of African origin to speak the Irish of the Galway Gaeltacht. He is listed on the 1911 Census aged 22, working there as a valet in Lynch's house. In 1908, Tisani was jailed for 7 days hard labour for aiding "one John Caine to desert from the 88th Connaught Rangers". The contemporary records show that he was a catholic and that he could read and write. A month after his arrest, Tisani was assaulted by local man, Frederick Hoare.

He became an object of great curiosity in the area, few of the population having ever seen anyone who was not white-skinned before, and thus became part of local folklore for some generations. Tradition states that he died of loneliness and was buried in the local graveyard.

Tisani's death record states that he died on 2 June 1920 or 7 October 1920, in the Ballinasloe Asylum, of pulmonary congestion and cardiac failure. He was recorded as Osman Joseph Tissani of Barna, with his age was given as 33, and his occupation was listed as farmer. The property in Barna was taken by the Land Commission in 1923 and the entire property sold on the death of Miss Lilly Lynch in 1930.

== See also ==
- Rachael Baptist
