= Iryū =

Japanese manga series

- First tankōbon volume cover

医龍-Team Medical Dragon- (Iryū Chīmu Medikaru Doragon)
- Genre: Medical
- Manga
- Written by: Akira Nagai; Tarō Nogizaka
- Published by: Shogakukan
- Magazine: Big Comic Superior
- Original run: April 26, 2002 – January 26, 2011
- Volumes: 25
- Television drama
- Directed by: Satoshi Kubota (S1); Naruhide Mizuta (S1–4); Hiroki Hayama (S2–3); Kazunari Hoshino (S2); Ryo Tanaka (S3); Tomonobu Moriwaki (S4)
- Produced by: Sōsuke Osabe (S1–4); Yasuyuki Asuyuki (S1); Reiko Misao (S2); Tsuneya Watanabe (S3); Ayako Ohki (S4)
- Written by: Koji Hayashi (S1–3); Hideya Hamada (S4); Kayo Hikawa (S4)
- Music by: Shin Kono (S1–4); Hiroyuki Sawano (S1–4); Kei Yoshikawa (S4)
- Studio: Fuji Television
- Original network: FNS (Fuji TV)
- Original run: April 13, 2006 – March 20, 2014
- Episodes: 43
- icon

Iryū: Team Medical Dragon (Japanese: 医龍-Team Medical Dragon-, Hepburn: Iryū Chīmu Medikaru Doragon) is a Japanese medical manga series created by Akira Nagai and illustrated by Tarō Nogizaka; following Nagai's death in 2004, Nogizaka became the sole author, with medical supervision taken by Mie Yoshinuma. The manga was serialized in Shogakukan's seinen manga magazine Big Comic Superior from April 2002 to January 2011, with its chapters collected in 25 tankōbon volumes.

It was adapted into a live action series, which was broadcast between April and June 2006 and was followed up by three sequels in 2007, 2010, and 2014.

In 2005, the manga won the 50th Shogakukan Manga Award in the general category.

== Plot ==
Ryūtarou Asada is a prodigal surgeon who was exiled from the medical field. He is recruited by Akira Katō, an assistant professor, who wishes to use his skills to complete her thesis on the Batista procedure to promote herself politically in order to change the corruption in the Japanese medical system. Ryūtarou accepts and begins by recruiting a team skilled enough for the surgery.

== Characters ==
Ryūtarou Asada (朝田龍太郎, Asada Ryūtarou)
Ryūtarou is a prodigal surgeon who was framed for medical malpractice and exiled from the medical field. He is recruited by Akira Katō to work in a medical university. He was portrayed in the live action series by Kenji Sakaguchi.
Akira Katō (加藤晶, Katō Akira)
Akira is an assistant professor who aims to become a professor to change the corrupt Japanese medical system. She is portrayed in the live action series by Izumi Inamori.
Miki Satohara (里原ミキ, Satohara Miki)
Miki is a surgical nurse and Ryūtarou's lover. She is portrayed in the live action series by Asami Mizukawa.
Noboru Ijūin (伊集院登, Ijūin Noboru)
Noboru is a hard working medical intern who is not assimilated into the corrupt Japanese medical system. He is portrayed in the live action series by Teppei Koike.
Keisuke Fujiyoshi (藤吉圭介, Fujiyoshi Keisuke)
Keisuke is a cardiologist whose priority is for the patient and not the hospital. He is portrayed by Kuranosuke Sasaki.
Monji Arase (荒瀬門次, Arase Monji)
Monji is a skilled anesthesiologist who charges high amount for every surgery. He is portrayed in the live action series by Sadao Abe.
Takeo Noguchi (野口賢雄, Noguchi Takeo)
Takeo is the professor of the cardiology department. He values his reputation over the lives of his patients. He is portrayed in the live action series by Ittoku Kishibe.
Gunji Kirishima (霧島軍司, Kirishima Gunji)
Gunji is Miki's half brother and is a strong political figure in the medical field. He was the one who framed Asada for medical malpractice and used his influence to exile him from the medical field. He is portrayed in the live action series by Kazuki Kitamura.
Naoto Kitō (鬼頭直人, Kitō Naoto)
Naoto Kitō is the professor of the emergency department who wants to recruit Ryūtarou into his department.
Shōko Kitō (鬼頭笙子, Kitō Shōko)
Shōko Kitō is the professor of the emergency department. She is later the dean of the hospital. She is portrayed in the live action series by Mari Natsuki.
Takehiko Kihara (木原毅彦, Kihara Takehiko)
Takehiko Kihara is Kato's assistant. He is portrayed in the live action series by Tetsuhiro Ikeda.

== Media ==
=== Manga ===
Team Medical Dragon was created by doctor, writer, and medical journalist Akira Nagai, and illustrated by Tarō Nogizaka. The series debuted in Shogakukan's seinen manga magazine Big Comic Superior on April 26, 2002. (Note: The series started in the May 17 issue (cover date), released on April 26, 2002.) Nagai died of liver cancer in 2004, and Nogizaka became the sole author of the series, with medical supervision taken by Mie Yoshinuma. The series finished on January 28, 2011. Shogakukan collected its chapters into twenty-five tankōbon volumes, released between September 30, 2002, and February 26, 2011.

==== Volumes ====
No.	Japanese release date	Japanese ISBN
1	September 30, 2002	978-4-09-186561-8
1. "The Awakening of the Dragon" (龍の目覚め, Ryū no Mezame); 2. "A Patient We Can Kill" (死なせていい患者, Shinase tei Kanja); 3. "The Interns of Japan" (日本の研修医, Nippon no Kenshūi); 4. "Reality of Surgeons" (外科医の現実, Gekai no Genjitsu); 5. "A Different Breed" (別の生き方, Betsu no Ikikata); 6. "A Hospital Acquired Infection" (院内感染, Innai Kansen); 7. "A Living Human" (生身の人間, Namami no Ningen)
Akira Katō is searching for Ryūtarou Asada, a prodigal surgeon who has been exiled from the medical field by a political figure, in order to use his skills to develop her thesis on the Batista procedure. After finding him, Akira makes arrangements to have Ryūtarou work at Meishin Medical University Center. During Ryūtarou's first surgery there, the lead surgeon decides to let the patient die after doing the minimal procedures needed to avoid a lawsuit; Ryūtarou takes over and saves the patient's life. That night, Ryūtarou and Noboru Ijūin, a medical intern, are put on call and a patient arrives needing an emergency appendectomy; Ryūtarou guides Noboru to the surgery and afterwards, decides to recruit him for the Batista procedure. Noboru goes to his side job at a hospital and finds Ryūtarou working there. A girl comes in requiring stitches on her scalp; Ryūtarou instead ties her hair with a surgical knot which is a better solution for that injury. The next day, Ryūtarou meets Keisuke Fujiyoshi, a cardiologist whose recent patient died due to a Hospital-acquired infection from an unnecessary surgery. Shortly after, two Meishin professors disregard Keisuke's diagnoses and plan a surgery for Keisuke's daughter.
2	January 30, 2003	978-4-09-186562-5
8. "An Escaping Life" (逃げる命, Nigeru Inochi); 9. "A Doctor's Use of Violence" (医者の暴力, Isha no Bōryoku); 10. "The Price of Changing Hospitals" (転院の代償, Tenin no Daishō); 11. "The Death Bringing Pacemaker" (死を呼ぶペースメーカー, Shioyobu Pēsu Mēkā); 12. "The Professor's Selected Model" (教授選定機種, Kyōju Sentei Kishu); 13. "Those who Leave the Department" (医局を去る者, Ikyoku Osarumono); 14. "Clinical Trial of an Anti-Cancer Agent" (抗ガン剤治験, Kōganzai Chiken); 15. "The Will of the Patient" (患者の意志, Kanja no Ishi)
Having lost faith in Meishin's judgement, Keisuke runs away with his daughter to search for another hospital not affiliated with Meishin. On the way, Keisuke's Wolff–Parkinson–White syndrome acts up and puts him in cardiac arrest; Ryūtarou is able to resuscitate him with a car battery and implants an Implantable cardioverter-defibrillator during surgery. Ryūtarou reviews Keisuke's daughter's diagnoses and agrees surgery is unnecessary and has Akira disregard the professors' diagnosis. Out of respect for Ryūtarou, Keisuke volunteers to join the Batista procedure for the pre/post surgery treatments. Later, Meishin a rise in admission of patients with Cardiac dysrhythmia; Ryūtarou investigates and discovers the artificial cardiac pacemaker endorsed by Takeo Noguchi, the professor of the cardiology department, is defective. After revealing that fact, the patients receive new pacemakers and Takeo shifts the pacemaker's fault onto another doctor to protect his reputation. Later, a Meishin doctor has his patient test a new medicine for cancer which, unknown to the patient, causes intense pain as a side effect. Ryūtarou reveals this fact to the patient's husband who requests a Hospice treatment for his wife.
3	April 30, 2003	978-4-09-186563-2
16. "The Quality of Life" (クオリティ・オブ・ライフ, Kuoriti obu Raifu); 17. "Suicide Patient" (自殺患者, Jisatsu Kanja); 18. "A Patient Without Insurance" (保健証を持たざる患者, Koken shōo mota zaru Kanja); 19. "The Dilemma of a Medical Student" (医学生の困惑, Igaku sei no Konwaku); 20. "Consumed Interns" (すり減る研修医, Suriheru Kenshūi); 21. "Routine Professor's Conference" (定例教授会, Teirei Kyōju Kai); 22. "Image Training" (イメージトレーニング, Imēji Torēningu); 23. "Assistant" (助手, Joshu)
A returning patient for suicide requires surgery. Afterwards, Ryūtarou shows the patient a video of her beating heart during surgery and encourages her to live on. Later, a foreigner requires emergency surgery but is rejected by all hospitals due to the lack of insurance. Ryūtarou takes the foreigner in and saves his life by using an atriocaval shunt. Meishin's professor meet to decide which department will pay for the previous surgery. Naoto Kitō, the professor of the emergency department, decides to pay as he intends to recruit Ryūtarou into his department. Akira finalizes the Batista team with: Ryūtarou as the lead surgeon; herself and Noboru as assistants; Miki Satohara, a surgical nurse and Ryūtarou's lover; and two fillers as the anesthesiologist and clinical engineer. Akira arranges an operation for the team to test their capabilities.
4	September 30, 2003	978-4-09-186564-9
24. "Katō's Ten Stitches" (加藤の10針, Katō no 10 Hari); 25. "A Live Sacrificial Patient" (生贄患者, Ikenie Kanja); 26. "Batista Patient Number One" (第1号バチスタ患者, Dai 1 gō Bachisuta Kanja); 27. "Thesis vs Patient" (論文 VS 患者, Ronbun VS Kanja); 28. "Two Days Before Batista" (バチスタ2日前, Bachisuta ni Nichimae); 29. "The First Batista Operation" (第1回バチスタ手術, dai 1 kai Bachisuta Shujutsu); 30. "Beating Cardiac Muscle" (動く心筋, Ugoku Shinkin); 31. "Dynamic Visualization" (動的イメージ, Dōteki Imēji)
Akira receives two candidates afflicted with Dilated cardiomyopathy for the Batista procedure. Only one of them has a good chance of surviving causing her to be conflicted on whether to save both lives or sacrifice one for her thesis; Ryūtarou convinces her to rely on his abilities to save them both. Naoto arranges a meeting with Akira and asks her to give Ryūtarou to the emergency department in return for a vote in the professor candidate-ship. The Batista procedure begins and Ryūtarou requests the team to operate on the heart while it is beating. In doing so, he is able to detect the afflicted cardiac tissue through palpitation.
5	December 25, 2003	978-4-09-186565-6
32. "Medical Practitioner's Law" (越権医療行為, Ekken Iryōkōi); 33. "Violation of Medical Practitioners' Law" (医師法違反, Ishi hō Ihan); 34. "Batista... Complete" (バチスタ... 終了, Bachisuta... Shūryō); 35. "Hospital Ethics Committee" (院内倫理委員会, Innai Rinri iin Kai); 36. "Nurses and Doctors" (看護師と医者, Kangoshi to Isha); 37. "Medical Society Instigator" (学会荒らし, Gakkai Arashi); 38. "Doctor on Call" (ドクター・オン・コール, Dokutā on Kōru); 39. "Shift" (シフト, Shifuto)
6	June 30, 2004	978-4-09-186566-3
40. "Research Race" (越権医療行為, Ekken Iryōkōi); 41. "ER"; 42. "Dangerous Anesthesia" (危険な麻酔, Kiken na Masui); 43. "Distance from Patients" (患者との距離, Kanja to no Kyori); 44. "Experiments with Human Subjects" (人体実験, Jintai Jikken); 45. "Doctors Playing with Medication" (医者の薬遊び, Isha no Kusuri Asobi); 46. "Disclosure" (ディスクロージャー, Disukurōjā); 47. "Final Words" (最期の言葉, Saigo no Kotoba)
7	October 29, 2004	978-4-09-186567-0
48. "Near DOA"; 49. "Perfect Teamwork" (コンビネーション, Konbinēshon); 50. "Concealment of Medical Malpractices" (医療ミス隠蔽工作, Iryō Misu Inpei Kōsaku); 51. "Dropout" (ドロップアウト, Doroppu Auto); 52. "Professor's Recommendation" (教授推薦, Kyōju suisen); 53. "Professor's Evaluation" (術前検査, Jutsu zen Kensa); 54. "Palpation" (触診, Shokushin); 55. "Tripartite of Medicine" (三権分立, Sankenbunritsu); 56. "Reformer" (改革者, Kaikakusha)
8	February 28, 2005	978-4-09-186568-7
57. "Proponent" (選挙協力, Senkyo Kyōryoku); 58. "Mallory–Weiss" (マロリー・ワイス, Marorī Waisu); 59. "HYHA Classification" (HYHA 分類, HYHA Bunrui); 60. "Disc" (ディスク, Disuku); 61. "Electoral Reform Committee" (選挙改革委員会, Senkyo Kaikaku iin Kai); 62. "Staff" (スタッフ, Sutaffu); 63. "Operating room No.9" (第9手術室, Dai 9 Shujutsu Shitsu); 64. "Leak" (リーク, Rīku); 65. "Professor's Qualifications" (Kyōju no Shishitsu, Kaikakusha)
9	July 29, 2005	978-4-09-186569-4
66. "The Second Enemy" (第二の敵, Daini no Teki); 67. "Supporters" (派閥, Habatsu); 68. "Those in White Coats" (白衣, Kakui); 69. "Extraordinary Professors Meeting" (臨時教授会, Rinji Kyōju kai); 70. "On Standby" (当直, Tōchoku); 71. "Clinical Experience" (臨床経験, Rinshō Keiken); 72. "Crucial Moment" (天下分け目, Tenkawakeme); 73. "The Third Batista Operation" (第3回バチスタ, Dai 3 Kai Bachisuta)
10	December 26, 2005	978-4-09-186570-0
74. "Beyond Expectations" (想定外, Sōtei Gai); 75. "Secret Information" (密告, Mikkoku); 76. "Support" (支持, Shiji); 77. "The Deliberation Game" (審議ゲーム, Shingi Gēmu); 78. "Silence" (沈黙, Chinmoku); 79. "Assessment" (評価, Hyōka); 80. "Exit" (退室, Taishitsu); 81. "Hands" (手, Te)
11	March 30, 2006	978-4-09-180216-3
82. "Reverse Position" (逆位置, Gyaku Ichi); 83. "New Batista" (新バチスタ, Shin Bachisuta); 84. "End of the Procedure" (手術終了, Shujutsu Shūryō); 85. "Raising the Curtain on the Election Campaign" (選挙戦開幕, Senkyo Sen Kaimaku); 86. "Election Administration" (選管, Senkan); 87. "The Third Person" (3人目, 3 Ninme); 88. "The Strategy" (戦略, Senryaku); 89. "Black Ship" (黒船, Kurofune); 90. "The Third Man" (第三の男, Daisan no Otoko)
12	September 29, 2006	978-4-09-180725-0
91. "Online" (オンライン, Onrain); 92. "Secret Weapon" (秘密兵器, Himitsu Heiki); 93. "Complete Removal" (全摘出, Zen Tekishutsu); 94. "Personnel Selection Miss" (人選ミス, Jinsen Misu); 95. "Whirlpool of Power" (権力の渦, Kenryoku no Uzu); 96. "Odds and Ends" (最先端, Saisentan); 97. "Disadvantagous Material" (マイナス材料, Mainasu Zairyō); 98. "Don't Go" (いかないで, Ikanaide)
13	March 30, 2007	978-4-09-181168-4
99. "Dice" (サイコロ, Saikoro); 100. "An Ordinary Person's Radiance" (凡人の輝き, Bonjin no Kagayaki); 101. "Brainwashing" (洗脳, Sennō); 102. "Level" (レベル, Reberu); 103. "Ijūin's Strength" (伊集院の力, Ijūin no Chikara); 104. "Petition" (請願, Seigan); 105. "Departure" (旅立ち, Tabidachi); 106. "The Arena" (土俵, Dohyō)
14	July 30, 2007	978-4-09-181379-4
107. "The Strongest Armor" (最強の鎧, Saikyō no Yoroi); 108. "Returning the Favor" (お返し, Okaeshi); 109. "Opinion" (意見, Iken); 110. "Keeping Silent" (口止め, Kuchidome); 111. "Milk" (ミルク, Miruku); 112. "The Things I Desire" (欲しいもの, Hoshimono); 113. "Funeral" (弔い, Tomurai); 114. "Privilege" (特権, Tokken)
15	November 30, 2007	978-4-09-181539-2
115. "Goodbye" (グッドバイ, Guddobai); 116. "Getting Ahead" (出世亡者, Shusse Mōja); 117. "Head of the Family" (家長, Kachō); 118. "Hurdle" (ハードル, Hādoru); 119. "Urgent First Aid" (救急の緊急, Kyūkyū no Kinkyū); 120. "ABDC"; 121. "Detection" (ケンパ, Kenpa); 122. "Bad Weather" (悪天候, Akutenkō)
16	February 29, 2008	978-4-09-181749-5
123. "Cowardice" (卑怯, Hikyō); 124. "Coming Out" (カミングアウト, Kamingu Auto); 125. "Not yet..." (まだか..., Madaka...); 126. "Fool" (バカ, Baka); 127. "Salute" (敬礼, Keirei); 128. "An Ordinary Person's Decision" (凡人の選択, Bonjin no Sentaku); 129. "Consciousness of 30" (意識 30, Ishiki 30); 130. "Weight of Blood" (血液の重さ, Ketsueki no Omosa); 131. "Against Oneself" (対自, Tai Ji)
17	May 30, 2008	978-4-09-181897-3
132. "Survivor" (遺族, Izoku); 133. "Glasses" (メガネ, Megane); 134. "Woman" (女, Onna); 135. "Morning Sickness" (ツワリ, Tsuwari); 136. "Childcare and Childbirth" (出産と育児, Shussan to Ikuji); 137. "Benign Neglect" (傍観, Bōkan); 138. "Regret" (未練, Miren); 139. "A She-Devil"; 140. "Call" (コール, Kōru)
18	July 30, 2008	978-4-09-182100-3
141. "Which Priority" (どっち優先, Docchi Yūsen); 142. "No Significance" (意味がない, Imiganai); 143. "Follow"; 144. "Position Change" (ポジション・チェンジ, Pojishon Chenji); 145. "Resolution" (覚悟, Kakugo); 146. "Work Life Balance" (ワーク・ライフバランス, Wāku Raifu Baransu); 147. "Odds Disappearance" (勝算消滅, Shōsan Shōmetsu); 148. "Heaven" (天, Ten); 149. "12.31"
19	December 26, 2008	978-4-09-182289-5
150. "Guests" (客人, Kyakujin); 151. "Honeymoon" (蜜月, Mitsugetsu); 152. "Guru" (グル); 153. "U.S. Forces" (米軍, Beigun); 154. "All-star" (オールスター, Ōrusutā); 155. "Hospital Evaluation Mechanism" (病院評価機構, Byōin Hyōka Kikō); 156. "Ambition and Life" (野望と命, Yabō to Inochi); 157. "Medical Luxury" (豪華医療, Gōka Iryō)
20	February 27, 2009	978-4-09-182375-5
158. "Katō Plan" (加藤プラン, Katō Puran); 159. "Principle of Noguchi" (野口の原理, Noguchi no Genri); 160. "Arousal and Provocation" (覚醒と挑発, Kakusei to Chōhatsu); 161. "Order" (序列, Joretsu); 162. "Partner" (相棒, Aibō); 163. "Solicitation" (勧誘, Kanyū); 164. "Don't Come" (きちゃない, Kichanai); 165. "Least" (最低, Saitei)
21	September 30, 2009	978-4-09-182609-1
22	January 29, 2010	978-4-09-183006-7
23	June 30, 2010	978-4-09-183207-8
24	October 29, 2010	978-4-09-183506-2
25	February 26, 2011	978-4-09-183668-7

=== Live action series ===
The manga was adapted into a series of live action dramas by Fuji TV. Directed by both Satoshi Kubota and Naruhide Mizuta, the first season of the live action series was produced by Sōsuke Osabe and Yasuyuki Asuyuki with Koji Hayashi as the scriptwriter. The series ran for 11 episodes which were broadcast on Fuji TV between April 13, 2006, and June 29, 2006. The ending theme for the first season is "Believe" by Ai. Fuji TV released a DVD box set on October 27, 2006. The soundtrack for the series was released by Universal Sigma on June 7, 2006, which was re-released by Universal Sigma on September 18, 2013.

Directed by Hiroki Hayama, Kazunari Hoshino and Naruhide Mizuta, the second season of the live action series was produced by Sōsuke Osabe and Reiko Misao with Koji Hayashi as the scriptwriter. The series ran for 11 episodes which were broadcast on Fuji TV between October 11, 2007, and December 20, 2007. The ending theme for the second season is "One" by Ai. Fuji TV released a DVD box set on April 16, 2008. The soundtrack for the series was released by Universal Sigma on November 28, 2007, which was re-released by Universal Sigma on September 18, 2013.

Directed by Hiroki Hayama, Ryo Tanaka and Naruhide Mizuta, the third season of the live action series was produced by Tsuneya Watanabe with Koji Hayashi as the scriptwriter. The series ran for 10 episodes on Fuji TV between October 14, 2010, and December 16, 2010. The ending theme for the third season is "Door to the Future" (未来への扉, Mirai e no Tobira) by Deep. Fuji TV released a DVD box set on April 6, 2011. The soundtrack for the series was released by Universal Sigma on December 8, 2010.

A fourth season of the drama was announced in 2013. It was broadcast from January 9 to March 20, 2014.

== Reception ==
Iryū: Team Medical Dragon received won the 50th Shogakukan Manga Award in the general category in 2005.
