= João Batista =

João Batista or João Baptista is Portuguese for John the Baptist. It may refer to:

- João Batista de Andrade (born 1939), Brazilian film director and screenwriter
- João Baptista Borges, Angolan politician
- João Baptista de Oliveira Figueiredo, Brazilian military leader and politician
- João Baptista da Silva Leitão de Almeida Garrett, 1st Viscount of Almeida Garrett, Portuguese writer and politician
- João Baptista Lavanha, Portuguese cartographer, mathematician and geographer
- João Baptista Martins, Portuguese football striker
- João Batista Queiroz (fl. 1950–1980s), Brazilian comics artist and illustrator
- João Batista da Silva (athlete) (born 1963), Brazilian sprinter
- João Batista (footballer, born 1961), Brazilian football defender
- João Batista (footballer, born 1966), Brazilian football midfielder
- João Batista (footballer, born 1975), Turkish-Brazilian football midfielder
- Mawete João Baptista, Angolan ambassador

== See also ==
- São João Batista (disambiguation)
- Juan Bautista (disambiguation)
- Jean-Baptiste
