= Batiste (disambiguation) =

Batiste is a lightweight woven fabric.

Batiste may also refer to:

== People ==
- Batiste (surname)
- Batiste Madalena (1902–1988), American commercial artist

== See also ==
- Baptiste (disambiguation)
- Baptist (disambiguation)
- Batista
- Battiste
