= Baptiste (name) =

- Language: French

Other names
- See also: Jean-Baptiste

Baptiste is a French given name or surname, and may be a shortened form of Jean-Baptiste (literally, John the Baptist).

== Given name ==
- Baptiste Amar (born 1979), French ice hockey player
- Baptiste Giabiconi (born 1989), French model and singer
- Baptiste Manzini (1920–2008), American football player
- Baptiste Martin (born 1985), French football player
- Baptiste Pierre Bisson (1767–1811), French military
- Baptiste Rollier (born 1982), Swiss orienteer

== Surname ==
- Alex Baptiste (born 1986), English football player
- Alva Baptiste, a Saint Lucian politician
- Archie Baptiste (born 2005), English footballer
- Bryan Baptiste (1955–2008), American politician
- Christian Baptiste (born 1962), French politician from Guadeloupe
- Christon Baptiste (born 1980), Trinidadian football player
- Cyril Baptiste (1949–2006), American basketball player
- Denys Baptiste (born 1969), British jazz musician
- Eldine Baptiste (born 1960), West Indian cricket player
- Fredrique Eleonore Baptiste (died 1827), Swedish-Finnish playwright
- Hailey Baptiste (born 2001), American tennis player
- Hilson Baptiste (1947–2025), Antiguan politician
- Jason Baptiste, American businessman and author
- Jennie Baptiste (born 1971), English photographer
- Kelly-Ann Baptiste (born 1986), Trinidad & Tobago female sprinter
- Kerry Baptiste (born 1981), Trinidad and Tobago football player
- Kirk Baptiste (1962–2022), American athlete
- Leroy Baptiste, Trinidad and Tobago politician
- Mona Baptiste (1926–1993), Trinidad and Tobago singer and actress
- Nicolas Anselme Baptiste (1761–1835), French actor
- Rocky Baptiste (born 1972), English football player
- Selwyn Baptiste (1936–2012), Trinidadian-born steelpan musician and educator
- Thomas Baptiste (1929–2018), Guyanese-born British actor
- Trinity Baptiste (born 1998), American basketball player
- Dane Baptiste (born 1981), British Comedian

== Fictional people ==
- Baptiste, full name Jean-Baptiste Augustin, fictional player character in Overwatch
- Baptiste, fictional character in the video game Assassin's Creed III: Liberation
- Baptiste, fictional character in the video game Vainglory
- Andre Baptiste, fictional character in the 2005 film Lord of War
- Danielle Baptiste, fictional character in the comic book series Witchblade
- Didier Baptiste, fictional character in the British television series Dream Team

== See also ==
- Baptiste (disambiguation)
- Batista (Portuguese/Spanish surname)
- Battista (Italian surname and given name) meaning "Baptist"
- Bautista (Spanish surname and given name) meaning "Baptist"
- Baptista (Portuguese surname and given name) meaning "Baptist"
- Baptistin (French name) meaning "Baptist"
