= Laboissière =

Laboissière may refer to:

Places

- Laboissière-en-Santerre, Somme, France
- Laboissière-en-Thelle, Oise, France

People with the surname

- Pierre Garnier de Laboissière (1755–1809), French general

== See also ==
- La Boissière (disambiguation)
