= Battiste =

Battiste is an English surname. Notable people with the surname include:

- Harold Battiste (1931–2015), American musical artist
- Jaime Battiste (born 1979), Canadian politician
- Marie Battiste (born 1949), North American author and educator
- Merle Battiste (1933–2009), American chemist
- Rose Battiste (1947–2023), American singer
- Wally Battiste (1892–1965), English footballer

== See also ==
- Batiste (disambiguation)
