= Augusto Bautista =

Filipino basketball player

Career information
- College: JRC
- Position: Forward; Center
Medals
Men's basketball
Representing Philippines
Far Eastern Games
Gold medal – first place	1925 Manila	Team

Augusto "Totoy" Bautista was a Filipino basketball player who made it to six national teams within the span of 11 years. He was one of the best center-forwards in pre-war basketball.

At the young age of 21, Totoy made the 1919 Far Eastern Games in Manila. For five successive FEAA Games, he made the national team: 1921 in Shanghai; 1923 in Osaka; 1925 in Manila; 1927 in Shanghai and 1930 in Tokyo. After completing his primary schooling in Malate, he moved to Paco Elementary then to Manila High. He started his college education at Jose Rizal College.

The best Philippine showing in FEAA Games was in 1925 when the Filipinos swept both rounds. With him were Vicente Avena, Dionisio Calvo, Mariano Filomeno, Joaquin Iñigo, Pedro Robles, Jose Rodriguez, Alfredo Del Rosario, Lou Salvador and Mariano Sangle. Upon his retirement, Bautista served in various capacities in basketball, aside from being assistant coach to Del Rosario in the 1934 FEAA Games, he served in the same year in the defunct PAAF. In 1956, he was team manager of the basketball team in the Melbourne Olympics and again in 1960 Rome Olympics.

Totoy once coached the Ateneo Blue Eagles and San Beda Red Lions, then shifted to officiating in the later forties in the NCAA and UAAP.
