= Antonio Bautista =

Philippine Air Force commander (1937–1974)

Antonio M. Bautista
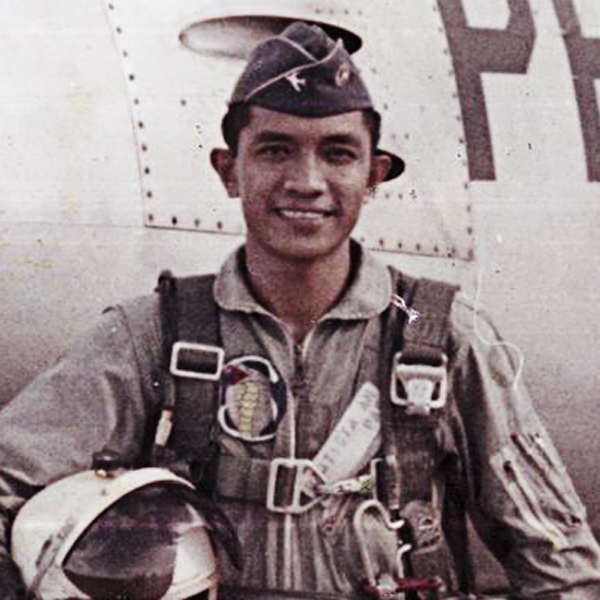
- Antonio Bautista circa 1964
- Born: September 17, 1937; Cabanatuan, Nueva Ecija, Commonwealth of the Philippines
- Died: January 11, 1974 (aged 36); Parang, Jolo, Sulu, Philippines
- Military career
- Allegiance: Philippines
- Service years: 1958–1974
- Rank: Lieutenant Colonel
- Nicknames: Tony, Bote
- Unit: Philippine Air Force
- Commands: 9th Tactical Fighter Squadron, 5th Fighter Wing Commander, Joint 7th and 9th Fighter Squadron, SATAG
- Conflicts: Philippine Insurgency Wars of the 70's
- Awards: Distinguished Conduct Star (1) Gold Cross of Gallantry (2); Military Merit Medal (7); Silver Wing Medal (2); Distinguished Aviation Cross (2) Military Commendation Medal (1)

Antonio Marfori Bautista (September 17, 1937 – January 11, 1974) was an F-86 Sabre pilot who served in the Philippine Air Force. He served in the aerobatic display team the Blue Diamonds and fought against rebels in the south of the country. He was killed in action in January 1974.

== Biography ==
Lieutenant Colonel Antonio "Tony" Marfori Bautista (serial no 0-4457) was a combat pilot of the Philippine Air Force (PAF). Tony Bautista was a former aviation cadet of the Philippine Air Force Flying School (PAF-FS) Class of 1958. He fought against government insurgents in the south of the Philippines in the 1970s.

He was a member of the Blue Diamonds Aerial Demonstration Team from 1964 to 1966 (with the 6th Tactical Fighter Squadron), the team leader of the 9th Tactical Fighter Squadron Aerobatic team "Golden Sabres" in 1972, and the team leader of the "Sabres", the combined 7th TFS "Red Aces" and 9th TFS "Golden Sabres" aerobatic teams in 1973.

Antonio Bautista graduated from The University of the Philippines in Los Baños in 1957 with a degree in Agriculture. He signed up for the Philippine Air Force Flying School in Fernando Air Base, Lipa, Batangas, graduating in 1958, and was sent to the 5th Fighter Wing stationed at Basa Air Base, Floridablanca, Pampanga. His first assignment was with the 8th Fighter Squadron, Nicknamed "Scorpions", flying piston-driven North American F-51 Mustangs. At about the same time, the Philippine Air Force was in the process of transitioning to Jets, so in 1959, in preparation for jet training, he was sent to Kadena Air Force Base in Okinawa, Japan, for Altitude Physiological Training. In 1961 to 1962, he took the U.S. Air Force's Jet Qualification Course at Randolph Air Force Base, San Antonio, Texas. In 1962, he continued his training at Luke Air Force Base, Arizona, for aerial gunnery and combat training.

When Bautista returned from overseas training, he was posted at Basa Air Base but was reassigned to the 6th Tactical Fighter Squadron flying the North American F-86 Sabre. In 1971, he assumed command of the 9th Tactical Fighter "Limbas" Squadron. His last assignment was as Commander of the joint 7th and 9th Tactical Fighter Squadrons of the Sulu Air Task Group (SATAG) which was deployed in Edwin Andrews Air Base, Zamboanga, for Counter-insurgency (COIN) operations against insurgent separatists in Mindanao.

Antonio Bautista is the only airman known to have served with all five fighter squadrons in the Philippine Air Force 5th Fighter Wing; the 105th, 6th TFS, 7th TFS, 8th FS, and 9th TFS.

On 11 January 1974, he took off from Edwin Andrews Air Force Base leading an element of two F-86 Sabres to support government troops that were under attack by a large number of armed rebels in Parang on Jolo Island, 200 miles (320 km) away.

During the engagement he made several low attack runs, exposing himself and his aircraft to heavy rifle fire. When he finally broke off after two bombing runs and five strafing passes, his fighter was severely damaged; his wingman, Lt. Roger Crudo, informed him that the aircraft was on fire. He tried to divert to the nearby Jolo airstrip, but when his nose landing gear failed to fully deploy, he ejected at a low altitude of 1,000 feet (300 m); the airplane exploded seconds afterward. Despite having bailed out over government-controlled territory, his parachute drifted back over enemy lines. Rescue helicopters led by Col. Luis Diano landed a kilometer away from him due to severe hostile fire. Despite the rescue attempts and efforts by Bautista to defend his position using his service pistol, he was overwhelmed by more rebels and killed before rescue forces could reach him.

Philippine Air Force TSgt Nonito Calizo and Airman Benjamin Lojo were the first rescuers to arrive at the scene and secure Bautista's body and were decorated for retrieving Bautista's body.

For his "uncommon bravery and tenacity in the face of overwhelming odds," the Armed Forces of the Philippines, under General Order 519, posthumously awarded Bautista the Distinguished Conduct Star on April 29, 1974. His widow, Alice Jane Rigor received the awards on behalf of her husband from then Philippine President, Ferdinand Marcos. For his gallantry, the Philippine Air Force base at Puerto Princesa, Palawan (island) was named Antonio Bautista Air Base in his honor when it opened on 21 March 1975. It is now home to the Air Force's 570th Composite Tactical Wing.

== Gallery ==
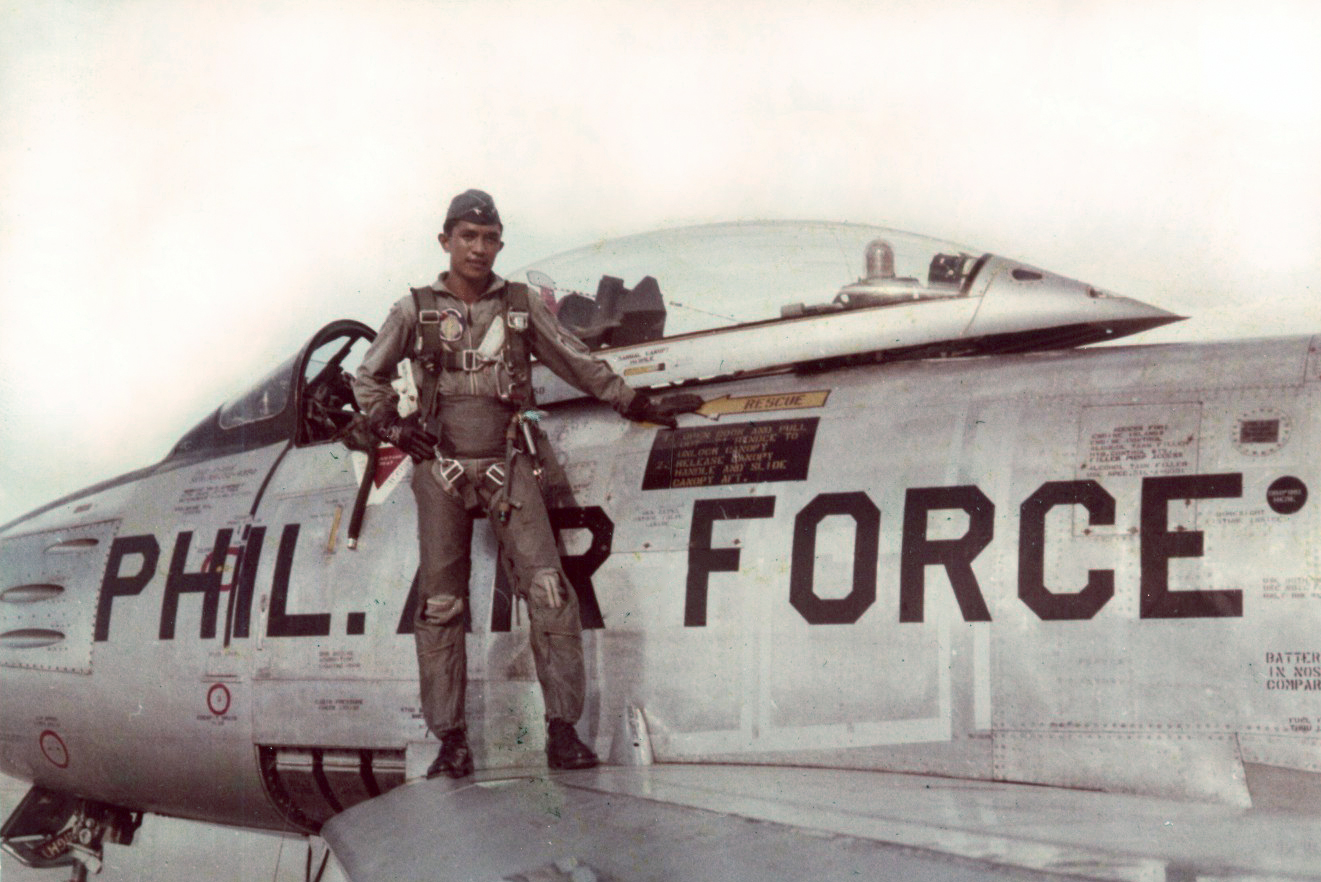
Captain Tony Bautista on his F-86 Sabre Jet Fighter (1964)

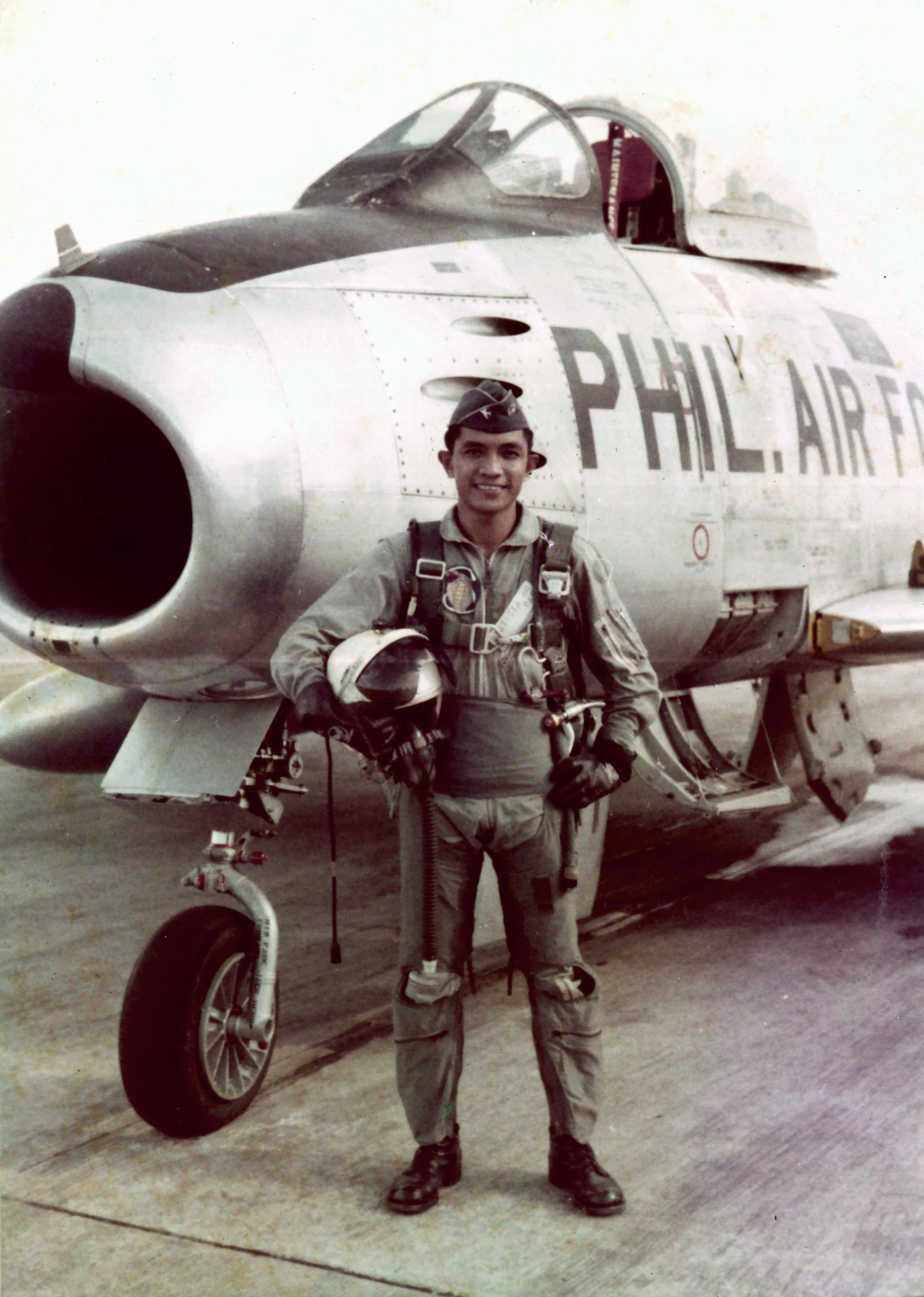
Captain Tony Bautista, 6th Tactical Fighter Squadron, 5th Fighter Wing, Basa Air Base (1964)

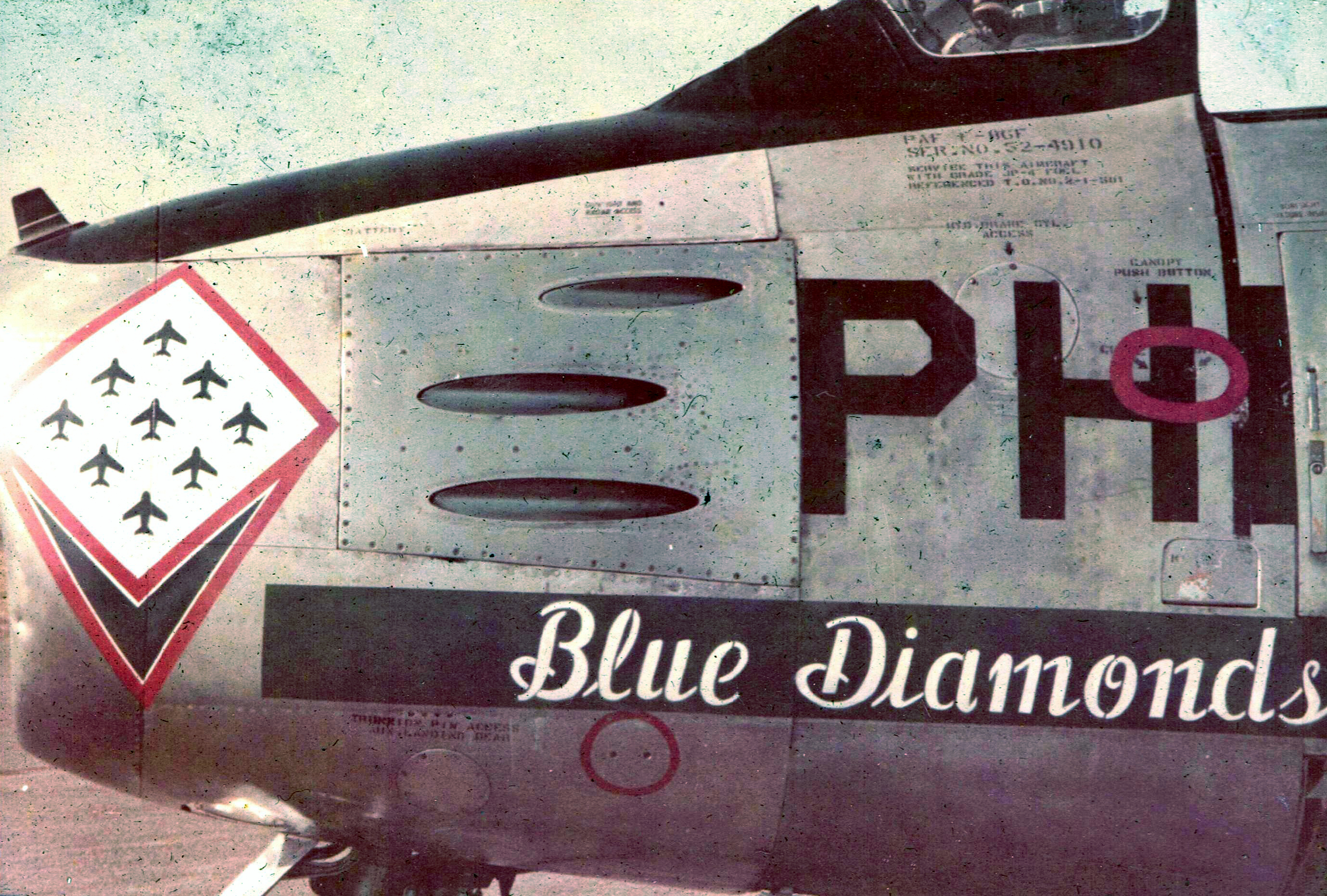
Captain Tony Bautista became a member of the famous Blue Diamonds, emblem shown here, The Aerobatic Team of the PAF

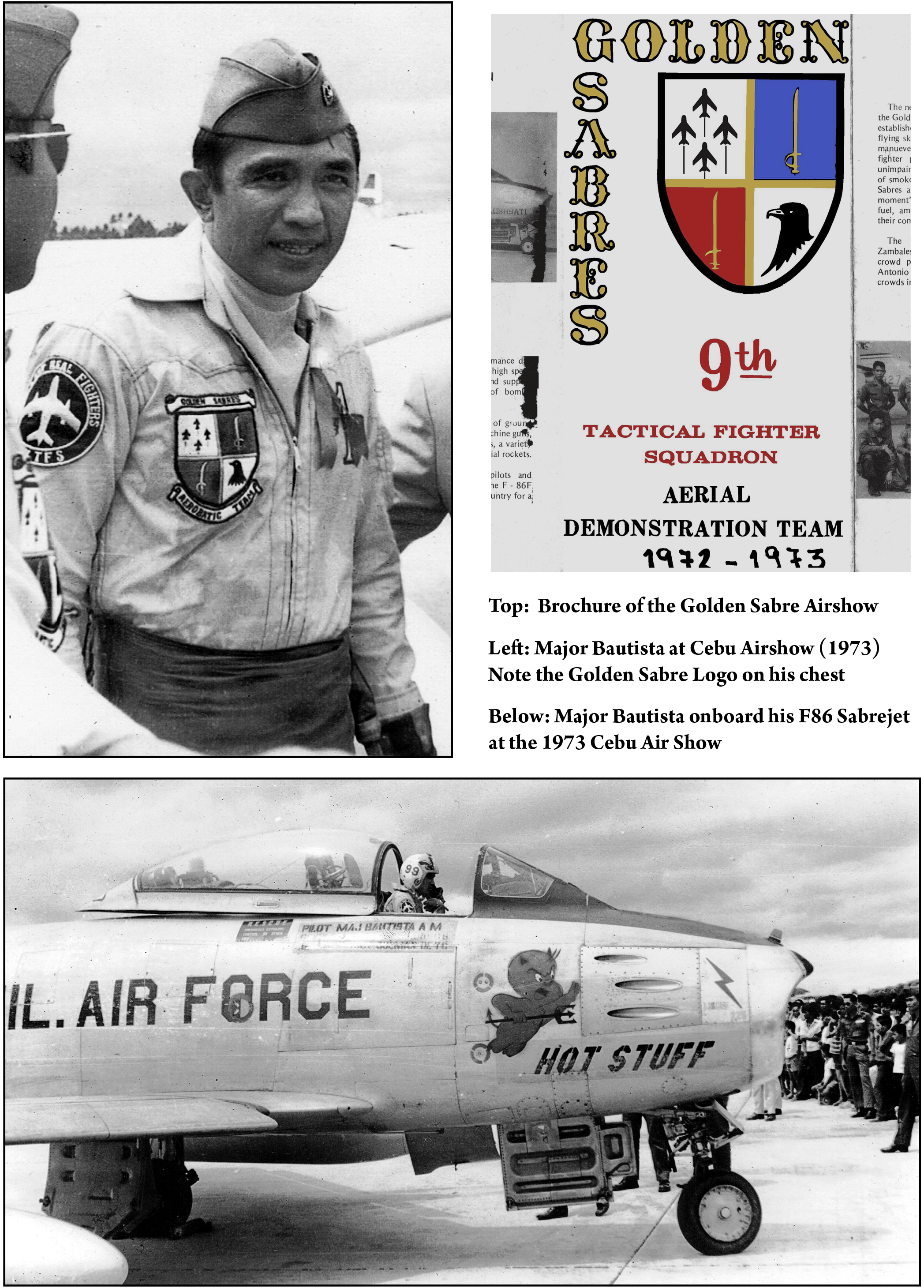
Major Bautista (1973) formed the Aerobatic team of the 9th tactical Fighter Squadron, the Golden Sabres. They performed mostly in the southern islands of the Visayas and Mindanao. Images from the 1973 Mactan Cebu Air Show.

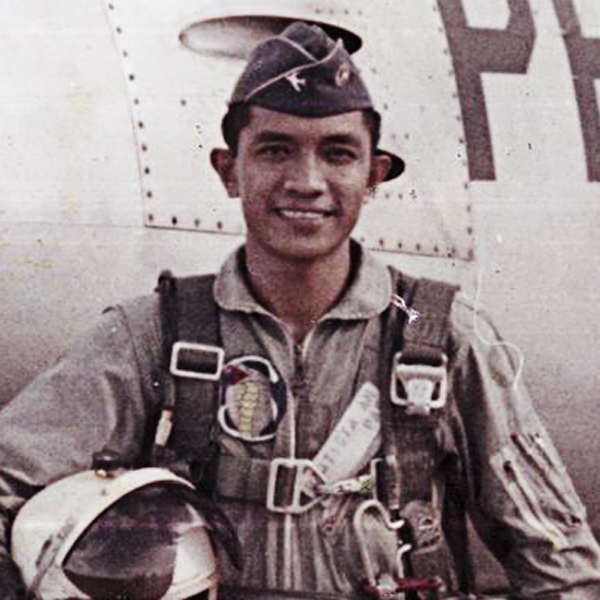
Capt Antonio Bautista (1964) Posing in his flight suit in front of his F86 Sabrejet, seen here wearing the logo of the 6th Tactical Fighter Squadron
