= Fellowship Baptist College =

Private college in Negros Occidental, Philippines

- Other name: FBC
- Former name: Fellowship Baptist Academy
- Motto: Ego Sum Lux (Latin)
- Motto in English: "I am the Light" - John 8:12
- Type: Private
- Established: 1954
- Affiliations: PRISAACK
- Religious affiliation: Baptist
- President: Marietta G. Villegas, LPT, Ed. D
- Location: Kabankalan City, Negros Occidental, Philippines; 9°59′10″N 122°49′05″E
- Campus: Urban
- Colors: Maroon, Gold & Gray
- Nickname: FBCians
- Website: www.fbc.edu.ph
- Location in the Visayas Location in the Philippines

Fellowship Baptist College (FBC) is a non-stock, private and sectarian institution in Kabankalan, Negros Occidental, Philippines established in 1954.

== History ==
Formerly known as "Fellowship Baptist Academy", the institution was founded by Baptist lay ministers, leaders and missionaries from the Visayan Fellowship of Fundamental Baptist Churches. It is a sectarian, non-stock and non-profit educational institution. Aside from student fees, it exists mainly upon benevolent donations from Fundamental Baptist churches organization, individual Christians and later from the alumni and its organization.

It opened in 1954 with an enrollment of 212 students. In 1957, Fellowship Baptist Academy was given government recognition. In June 1982, the school operated a post-secondary course in Midwifery. The following year, it opened two degree courses which are Bachelor of Science in Business Administration and Bachelor of Arts. Upon conferring the government recognition to these two courses, DECS acted favorably in school year 1989–1990 on the change of the status of the school from "Academy" to "College".

== Academics ==
FBC offers pre-school, grade school, junior high school, senior high school, and undergraduate and graduate level programs.

Its senior high school program has three (3) strands in the academic track, namely:

- Accountancy, Business and Management (ABM)
- Humanities and Social Sciences (HUMSS)
- Science, Technology, Engineering and Mathematics (STEM)

And three specialty courses for the Technological-Vocational (TECH-VOC) track, namely:

- Cookery
- Caregiving
- Information and Communication Technology (ICT)

As of 2019, it has six academic colleges namely:

- College of Teacher Education, Arts and Sciences
- College of Business and Accountancy
- College of Engineering and Computer Studies
- College of Pharmacy and Allied Health Programs
- College of Criminal Justice Education
- College of Library and Information Sciences
