= Randas Batista =

Brazilian cardiac surgeon

Randas José Vilela Batista
- Born: March 16, 1947 (age 78); Passos, Minas Gerais
- Citizenship: Brazilian
- Education: Universidade Federal do Paraná (MD)
- Occupation: Medical doctor
- Organization: Vilela Batista Heart Foundation
- Known for: Batista procedure

Randas José Vilela Batista (Passos, March 16, 1947) is a Brazilian medical doctor and cardiac surgeon.

== Early life and education ==
He graduated in medicine from the Federal University of Paraná (UFPR) in 1972. After that, he moved to United States to do residency. Twelve years later, after passing through Canada, England and France, he would end up with a postgraduate degree in cardiac surgery. Then he returned to teach medicine in Brazil.

== Cardiology ==
Doctor Randas developed eight techniques for cardiac care, considered revolutionary. The best known of these is the "Batista procedure", that removes a piece of the dilated heart (partial left ventriculectomy) to treat heart failure patients. Thus, the method would exclude the need of a transplant. The procedure became famous around the world, but there are some questions about its efficiency. According to information from the Brazilian Society of Cardiovascular Surgery, the technique has become obsolete. Four years since the first operation, only 25% of the patients survived.

Randas does not consider these data real. According to him, data from Instituto do Coração (InCor), which performs the surgery, indicates that survival 5 years after surgery is of 60%. He also suggests the reason why, in the United States, they do not perform procedures with the name "Batista Surgery": the technique is considered experimental there. In this way, the public authorities would not pay for the surgery, leaving to the interested patient the option to change the terminology to "ventricular aneurysm resection", which in practice is the same procedure, to have the treatment paid by the U.S. Government.

The techniques invented by Batista have rendered him honors in Brazil, European countries and the United States. He was awarded the title of Honorary Citizen by the Municipal Chamber of Campina Grande do Sul and the Legislative Assembly of Paraná. He also had his name engraved on a memorial on the island of Kos (which honors the father of medicine, Hippocrates), in Greece, and in United States he was considered one of the fifteen world heroes of medicine in a list of Time magazine and CNN. He is also the president of Fundação do Coração Vilela Batista (Vilela Batista Heart Foundation) that, in partnership with the Japanese holding group Tokushukai, built in the city of Apucarana, Paraná, the Hospital do Coração Torao Tokuda (Torao Tokuda Heart Hospital), which started up in 2012 and closed in 2015, having operated only with an outpatient clinic during that period.
