= Central Baptist Theological Seminary =

Central Baptist Theological Seminary may refer to:

- Central Baptist Theological Seminary in Shawnee, Kansas, affiliated with American Baptist Churches USA.
- Central Baptist Theological Seminary of Minneapolis in Plymouth, Minnesota, an independent fundamental Baptist graduate school of theology
- Central Baptist Theological Seminary in Virginia Beach, Virginia, a Baptist graduate school of theology

== See also ==
- Heritage College & Seminary, previously known as Central Baptist Seminary
