= Silverio Pinto Baptista =

East Timorese ombudsman

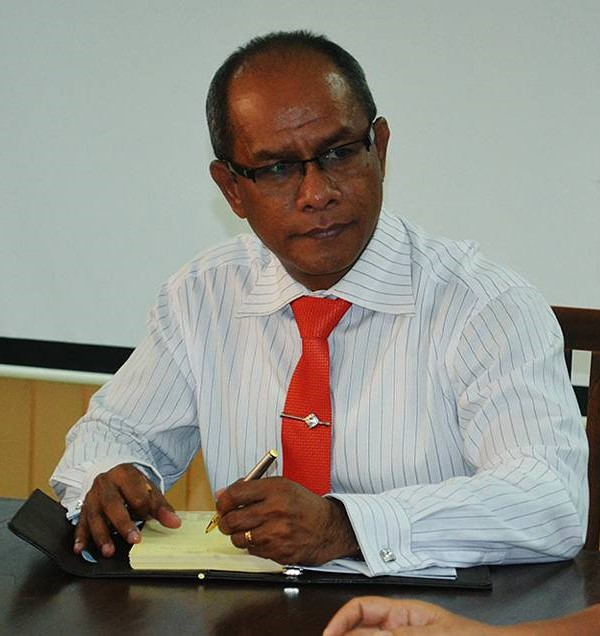
Silverio Pinto Baptista (2017)

Silverio Pinto Baptista (born 20 June 1969 in Dili, Timor-Leste) is the Provedor (Ombudsman) for Human Rights and Justice of Timor-Leste. He has held this position since October 2014. He is supported by the Office of the Provedor for Human Rights and Justice, or Provedoria dos Direitos Humanos e Justiça (PDHJ), which is the National Human Rights Institution of Timor-Leste.

== Early life ==
Silverio Pinto Baptista grew up during the Indonesian occupation of Timor-Leste, during which he witnessed suffering and serious human rights violations. As a consequence, he took part in Timor-Leste’s resistance movement from a young age.

== Education ==
Silverio Pinto Baptista pursued a law degree at the University of Indonesia and participated in student organisations supporting Timor-Leste’s independence.

== Professional life ==
After returning to Timor-Leste, Silverio Pinto Baptista worked with the Association for Rights (HAK) as a human rights defender, providing legal assistance to young Timorese captured by the Indonesian military during incidents in several parts of the country. In 2003, he was promoted to the position of Deputy Director of HAK.

On a voluntary basis, he has worked with a number of Timorese NGOs, including ALFELA, FOKUPERS, MAHEIN Foundation, and others. In 2005, he started working for the PDHJ as deputy Provedor. In October 2014, he was sworn in as the new Provedor for Human Rights and Justice.
