= Ezequiel Baptista =

Portuguese footballer (born 1926

Baptista
Personal information
- Full name: Ezequiel Monteiro Baptista
- Date of birth: 27 March 1926
- Place of birth: Portugal
- Position: Midfielder

Senior career*
Years	Team	Apps	(Gls)
- Sporting Braga

International career
1954	Portugal	1	(0)
- * Club domestic league appearances and goals

Ezequiel Monteiro Baptista (born 27 March 1926) is a Portuguese former footballer who played as midfielder.
