= La Boissière =

La Boissière is the name of several communes in France:

- La Boissière, Calvados, in the Calvados département
- La Boissière, Eure, in the Eure département
- La Boissière, Hérault, in the Hérault département
- La Boissière, Jura, in the Jura département
- La Boissière, Mayenne, in the Mayenne département

Also part of the name of:

- La Boissière-d'Ans, in the Dordogne département
- La Boissière-de-Montaigu, in the Vendée département
- La Boissière-des-Landes, in the Vendée département
- La Boissière-du-Doré, in the Loire-Atlantique département
- La Boissière-École, in the Yvelines département
- La Boissière-en-Gâtine, in the Deux-Sèvres département
- La Boissière-sur-Èvre, in the Maine-et-Loire département

== See also ==
- Laboissière (disambiguation)
