= John Baptist Wang Xiaoxun =

- Apostolic Prefecture of Xing'anfu
- Province: Shaanxi
- Diocese: Apostolic Prefecture of Xing'anfu
- Installed: 2016

Orders
- Ordination: 1992

Personal details
- Born: January 19, 1966 (age 60) Xi'an, Shaanxi, China
- Denomination: Roman Catholic
- Education: Shaanxi Theological Academy

Chinese name
- Traditional Chinese: 王曉勳
- Simplified Chinese: 王晓勋
Transcriptions
Standard Mandarin
- Hanyu Pinyin: Wāng Xiǎoxūn

John Baptist Wang Xiaoxun (Chinese: 王晓勋; born January 19, 1966) is a Chinese Catholic priest and Bishop of the Apostolic Prefecture of Xing'anfu from 2016. For the Chinese government, he was Bishop of the Diocese of Ankang, a diocese founded by the government.

== Biography ==
Wang was born in Xi'an, Shaanxi, on January 19, 1966. From a young age, he soon joined the path of practice at the Xi'an Seminary. In 1985, he attended the Shaanxi Theological Academy and graduated in 1992. In July 1992, he was ordained a priest when he was 26 years old, led by the archbishop of Xi'an Li Dao'an.

After ordained a priest, he did pastoral work in many parishes. In 2005, he was appointed a priest to administer the main parish of Ankang Parish. On October 13, 2010, he was elected as a Bishop's Assistant to the Ankang diocese, a diocese established by the Chinese government, with a close district. In April 2005 he was appointed pastor of Ankang diocese. On October 13, 2010, he was elected Coadjutor bishop of the Ankang diocese. He accepted the episcopacy with the papal mandate on November 30, 2016.
