= Geelong Baptist College =

Location
- Geelong, Victoria, 3221; Australia
- 38°4′0″S 144°19′45″E

Information
- Type: private, co-educational, Christian college
- Motto: Live the Truth
- Denomination: Baptist
- Established: 2000
- Principal: Andrew Liberts
- Chaplain: Anne Wetmore
- Teaching staff: 20
- Grades: Prep–12
- Enrolment: 122 + (2012)
- Website: www.gbc.vic.edu.au

Geelong Baptist College is a private, co-educational, Baptist college located in Geelong, Victoria, Australia. It was founded in 2002, on the site of the former Chanel College, and provides education for students from years Prep to 12.

Located at Lovely Banks, near Geelong, the college has a view over Corio Bay and the northern suburbs of Geelong. The current Primary Principal is Judy Sobey, and the Secondary Principal is Andrew Liberts. The school currently has around 130 students.
