= Alvin Batiste =

American jazz clarinetist (1932–2007)

Background information
- Born: November 7, 1932; New Orleans, Louisiana
- Died: May 6, 2007 (aged 74) Baton Rouge, Louisiana
- Genres: Jazz
- Occupation: Clarinetist
- Instrument: Clarinet

Alvin Batiste Sr. (November 7, 1932 – May 6, 2007) was an American avant-garde jazz clarinetist, who was born in New Orleans, Louisiana, United States. He taught at his own jazz institute at Southern University in Baton Rouge, Louisiana.

Alvin Batiste is a member of the Batiste Family of New Orleans. The extended Batiste family includes 25 professional musicians including Harold Battiste (AFO Records), Lionel Batiste, Russell Batiste Jr. and Jon Batiste (Stay Human).

Batiste was a member of the New Orleans–based American Jazz Quintet with Harold Battiste, Ed Blackwell, and Ellis Marsalis, Jr., His final album was a tribute produced by Branford Marsalis, and also featured Russell Malone and Herlin Riley.

Several well-known musicians studied under Batiste while at Southern University. They include Branford Marsalis, Randy Jackson, his brother Herman, Donald Harrison, Lee Allen, Henry Butler, Charlie Singleton (Cameo), Ronald Myers and Woodie Douglas (Spirit). Mike Esneault, an Emmy Award-winning composer, pianist, and educator was also mentored by Batiste. Several members of the Jazz at Lincoln Center Orchestra such as Reginald Veal, Wess "Warmdaddy" Anderson, and Herlin Riley were disciples of Batiste, some of whom were referred through Branford Marsalis. Jon Batiste called Alvin the clarinetist "who taught everyone from New Orleans music over the last 40 years."

Batiste died in Baton Rouge, of a heart attack in his sleep, aged 74.

== Discography ==
=== As leader ===
- 1984: Musique D'Afrique Nouvell Orleans (India Navigation)
- 1988: Bayou Magic (India Navigation)
- 1993: Late (Columbia Records)
- 1999: Songs, Words and Messages, Connections (SLM Records)
- 2007: Marsalis Music Honors Series: Alvin Batiste

=== As sideman ===
With Cannonball Adderley

- The Black Messiah (1972)
- Lovers ... (1976)

With Billy Cobham

- Magic (1977)

With Henry Butler

- The Village (1987, Impulse!)

With Clarinet Summit

- Clarinet Summit (1984)

With Marlon Jordan

- Marlon's Mode (1997)

With Mark Whitfield

- Patrice (1991)

With Wynton Marsalis

- Crescent City Christmas Card (1990)
