= Víctor Manuel Bautista López =

Mexican politician (born 1947)

- Born: 9 June 1947 (age 78); Villahermosa, Tabasco, Mexico
- Occupation: Politician
- Political party: PRD

Víctor Manuel Bautista López (born 9 June 1947) is a Mexican politician affiliated with the Party of the Democratic Revolution (PRD). In the 2012 general election he was elected to the Chamber of Deputies to represent the State of Mexico's 31st district during the 62nd session of Congress.
