= Baptist, Kentucky =

Unincorporated community in Kentucky, United States

- Unincorporated community
- Location within Kentucky Location within the United States
- Coordinates: 38°28′39″N 84°11′9″W
- Country: United States
- State: Kentucky
- County: Harrison
- Elevation: 761 ft (232 m)
- Time zone: UTC-6 (Central (CST))
  - Summer (DST): UTC-5 (CST)
- GNIS feature ID: 2564156

Baptist was an unincorporated community in Harrison County, Kentucky, United States.

== History ==
A post office was established at Baptist in 1888, and remained in operation until 1906. The community probably took its name from the local Beaver Baptist Church.
