= São João Batista =

São João Batista or São João Baptista (Portuguese for Saint John the Baptist) may refer to the following places:

== In Brazil ==
- São João Batista, Maranhão
- São João Batista, Santa Catarina
- São João Batista do Glória, Minas Gerais

== In Cape Verde ==
- São João Baptista (Ribeira Grande de Santiago), a parish on the island of Santiago
- São João Baptista (Boa Vista), a parish on the island of Boa Vista
- São João Baptista (Santo Antão), a parish on the island of Santo Antão
- São João Baptista (Brava), a parish on the island of Brava
- São João Baptista (Santo Antão), a parish on the island of Santo Antão

== In Benin ==
- Ouidah, a city that includes Fort of São João Baptista de Ajudá, a tiny Portuguese enclave occupied by Benin in 1961.

== In Portugal ==
- São João Baptista (Beja), a former parish in the municipality of Beja
- Santiago Maior - São João Baptista (Beja), a parish in the municipality of Beja since 2013
- São João Baptista (Campo Maior), a parish in the municipality of Campo Maior
- São João Baptista (Castelo de Vide), a parish in the municipality of Castelo de Vide
- São João Baptista (Entroncamento), a parish in the municipality of Entroncamento
- São João Baptista (Moura), a parish in the municipality of Moura
- São João Baptista (Porto de Mós), a parish in the municipality of Porto de Mós
- São João Baptista (Tomar), a parish in the municipality of Tomar
- São João Baptista de Airão, a parish in the municipality of Guimarães

== See also ==
- São João Baptista (galleon), a Portuguese galleon
