= Rachael Baptist =

- Also known as: Rachael Crow; Mrs. Crow
- Genres: Irish traditional music; Scottish folk music
- Occupation: Singer
- Years active: 1750–1773

Rachael Baptist, also referred to as Rachel Baptiste and Rachael Crow (fl. 1750–1775) was a Black singer active in Ireland and England in the mid-18th century.

== Life ==
Baptist was born sometime in the second quarter of the 18th century, but nothing else is known of her early life.

She was described as a native of Africa by John O'Keefe, but also described by Italian musician Bernardo Palma as a 'native of this country', which may allude to Ireland.

== Dublin stage ==
Her first recorded appearance on stage was in Dublin in February 1750, at a benefit concert for Bernardo Palma, her Italian singing teacher. From 1750 to 1753, Baptist performed regularly in Dublin, often at the Marlborough Green Gardens. The writer John O'Keeffe saw her perform and described her appearing on stage: "a real black woman, a native of Africa: she always appeared in the orchestra in a yellow silk gown, and was heard by the applauding company with great delight, without remarks upon her sables." Her final Dublin performance was in July 1756, singing in honour of General William Blakeney as part of Niccolo Pasquali's masque Hibernia's triumph.

=== English performances ===
From 1757 to 1767, Baptist herself stated she was in England, performing in London and Bath, however there is no mention of her in the playbills of reference works for the London stage at that time. It is possible it was Baptist who played Polly Peachum in The beggar's opera and later Juliet in Shakespeare's Romeo and Juliet in Lancashire during this time. In the spring and summer of 1758, she performed in the Ranelagh Gardens, Liverpool with local papers stating that "Miss Baptist, the celebrated singer from the gardens of Dublin". She appeared in Liverpool again in April 1767 under her married name, Mrs Crow.

=== Marriage to John Crow ===
Based on her appearing under her married name, Baptist married between the summer of 1758 and spring of 1767, with more exact details unknown. John Crow, often referred to simply as Mr. Crow, was a musician and taught violin and guitar, but also worked as a restorer of oil paintings using both the Italian and English methods.

Now performing under the name Mrs. Crow, the couple returned to Ireland in late 1767, where she performed at a concert at the Tholsel Assembly Room, Kilkenny in early December. From there she performed again in Kilkenny, Clonmel and Durrow. A poem was published in her honour in Finn's Leinster Journal following the success of her first Kilkenny concert. She was lauded alongside Thomas Ryder and Giusto Fernando Tenducci as transforming Kilkenny into a "Capua or town of pleasure."

=== Return to Ireland ===
In the years that followed, the couple would settle in an Irish provincial town over winter, and advertise concerts and balls with Mrs Crow, and musical tuition by her husband. From 1768 to 1769 they lived in Limerick. By summer of 1770 they were in Bandon and Cork. It is not recorded where they lived for the winter 1771–1772, but they were in Belfast in October 1772. Here they started their most expansive set of events, with concerts and balls once a month in the Assembly Room throughout the winter. They also performed at concerts in Carrickfergus, Downpatrick, and Lisburn. Their final concert took place on 30 April 1773 in Belfast. Baptist's repertoire was typical of the time, singing popular Irish and Scottish airs, with arias by Thomas Arne and George Frideric Handel.

== Later life ==
There is no record of Baptist or her husband after 1773. It is unknown where or when she died, or if the couple had children.

== See also ==
- Osmond Tisani
