= Marty Baptist =

Australian contemporary artist

Marty Baptist (born 1975 in Queensland, Australia) is a contemporary artist. His work has been exhibited internationally.

== Career ==
Baptist grew up skateboarding and began painting at an early age, but didn’t pursue it until he had a skateboard injury. He then studied visual art at Morningside College of Art in Queensland, Australia. He moved to Sydney, Australia to exhibit his work and then later moved to New Zealand for a few years where he worked on his craft.

On a commercial level he has collaborated with Oakley, Inc. and has been commissioned to work on such labels as Cliché skateboards and Vans Shoes.

In 2002 early in his career he was asked to exhibit with Space Invader and Lance Mountain in which huge light boxes where placed on the walls of the famous Hosier Lane in Melbourne Australia. His zine "Shadows of the mess you made" is held in the National Library of Australia.

In 2015 Baptist exhibited at Mountain Sounds Festival. and at the old Starland Dairy.

Baptist is living back in Sydney and currently working from his North Sydney studio.

== Work ==
His paintings are a mix of astute observations and out loud thoughts. The work has a dark sense of humour that he matches off against the everyday. His imagery ranges from oblique pop culture references to loose figurative observations. Baptist’s use of text gives the work another dimension of overture often at times making it hard to understand whether his remarks are made honestly or in jest. Baptist’s work questions how we live our daily lives. Often stating the obvious he creates an air of uncertainty around the simplest of things. Often described by his peers as "the artist's, artist".
