= Batista procedure =

Experimental heart procedure

The Batista procedure, also known as a Batista operation or partial left ventriculectomy (PLV), was an experimental heart procedure that proposed the reversal of the effects of remodeling in cases of end-stage dilated cardiomyopathy refractory to conventional medical therapy. The operation involves removing a slice of living tissue from an enlarged heart, then stitching together the beating heart, to allow the left ventricle to contract more efficiently. In spite of promising initial results, the method was soon found to be of little if any benefit, and it is no longer considered a recommended treatment for the disease.

The Batista procedure was invented by Brazilian physician and cardiac surgeon Randas Batista in 1994 for use in patients with non-ischemic dilated cardiomyopathy. Many of his patients were victims of Chagas disease. Chagas disease represents a parasitic nonischemic cardiomyopathy targeting parasympathetic inflow to the heart. Chagas cardiomyopathy thus represents a unique method of study of diastolic heart failure. It may be addressed by removal of a portion of viable tissue from the left ventricle to reduce its size (partial left ventriculectomy), with or without repair or replacement of the mitral valve.

Although several studies showed benefits from this surgery, studies at the Cleveland Clinic concluded that this procedure was associated with a high early and late failure rate. At 3 years only 26 percent were event-free and survival rate was only 60 percent. Most hospitals in the US have abandoned this operation and it is no longer included in heart failure guidelines.

A 2015 literature review found that although PLV had had poor overall results in the past 12 years with a high mortality rate, some success was found with PLV in Japan, and that a considerable number of lead authors of articles on PLV were Brazilian. The review concludes that the success rate of PLV can be improved by creating rigorous criteria for selecting patients, such as avoiding patients with large marginal arteries.

== In popular culture ==
Team Batista no Eikō is a 2006 Japanese mystery novel about a team of doctors that repeatedly succeeds with the Batista procedure, until the deaths of some patients leads to a murder investigation. The novel has been adapted into a film and television show.

The manga Iryū published from 2002 to 2011 features a team of doctors who are initially gathered to prove the efficacy of the Batista procedure.
