= Juan Bautista Vitón =

Spanish politician, merchant, and soldier

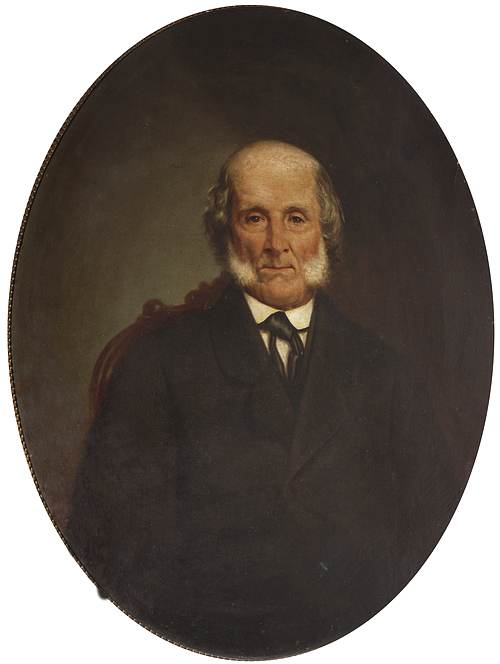
- portrait of Juan Bautista Vitón by Prilidiano Pueyrredón

Personal details
- Born: Juan Bautista Vitón y Santibáñez; 1780 Cádiz, Spain
- Died: 1868 (aged 87–88) Tigre, Argentina
- Occupation: politician merchant soldier
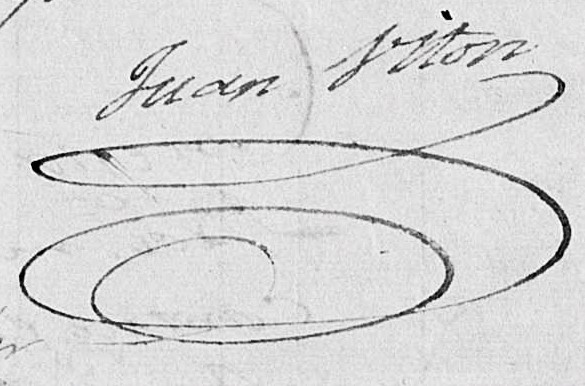
- Signature

Military service
- Allegiance: Spanish Empire
- Branch/service: Milicias de Buenos Aires
- Years of service: 1806-1807
- Rank: Lieutenant
- Unit: Cuerpo de Voluntarios Artilleros de la Unión
- Battles/wars: British invasions of the River Plate

Juan Bautista Vitón (1780 – 1868) was a Spanish politician, merchant and soldier who served in Buenos Aires as lieutenant in the Cuerpo de Voluntarios Artilleros de la Unión, a military unit created during the English Invasions of the Río de la Plata.

He was born in Cádiz, Spain, the son of Ramón Vitón and María Isabel Santibañez, belonging to a distinguished family. He had arrived around the year 1800 in Buenos Aires, Argentina, where he married Margarita López de Barrios y Chiclana, daughter of Nicolás López de Barrios and María Victoria Chiclana, the sister of lawyer Feliciano Antonio de Chiclana, a key player during the May Revolution.

He participated in the British invasions of the River Plate, serving as lieutenant of artillery in the Cuerpo de Voluntarios Artilleros de la Unión, take part in the main skirmishes against English troops. Due to his opposition to the cause of May Revolution, he was confined to La Rioja Province.
