= Batiste Madalena =

Batiste Madalena (1902–1988) was an American commercial artist best known for the original advertisements he created for the Eastman Theatre in Rochester, NY from 1924-1928. Other movie theater exhibitors commissioned film advertising but Madalena's work is the largest archive of this type of work to survive.

== Early life ==
Batiste Madalena was born in Italy and immigrated to the United States in 1904. He enrolled at the Mechanics Institute, later to become the Rochester Institute of Technology to study art. During his artistic training Madalena studied under influential advertising artist J. C. Leyendecker. In 1924 he had won just won a scholarship to the Art Students League of New York when he received a communication from inventor and photographic manufacturer George Eastman, who had just built the Eastman Theatre in Rochester, NY. Boasting 3,350 seats, the Eastman Theatre was the third-largest cinema in the United States at the time and the flagship in a first-run chain of movie Theatres.

== Work for the Eastman Theatre ==
Mr. Eastman disliked the publicity materials created by the movie studios and persuaded 22-year-old Madalena to postpone his studies and remain in Rochester to create original posters for his Theatre. "He told me, 'You do anything you want,' " Mr. Madalena recalled. "The only thing was, the posters had to be seen from the trolley car that stopped in front of the Theatre. The trolley was pretty far away, so the posters had to be big, not fancy and finicky. The point was to get people to cross the street and stop for a while at the Eastman." Between 1924 and 1928 the artist created an average of seven posters a week, a total of about 1,400 posters for the Eastman Theatre. He was paid $4.50 per poster. The silent films he created advertisements for include Laugh, Clown, Laugh starring Lon Chaney, Madame Sans-Gene starring Gloria Swanson, and The Mysterious Lady starring Greta Garbo.

== Technique ==
Madalena worked from publicity photographs sent to the Eastman Theatre by the movie studios. Each of his posters measured approximately 48" x 24" to fit into the theatre's glass covered advertising cases. He hand painted the images using gouache, tempera and conte crayon on posterboard. The influence of C. Coles Phillips “fadeaway” style can be seen in some of Madalena's works, for example his poster for Up Stage with Norma Shearer. Other characteristics include bold colors and the use of stylish freehand lettering. In a review of Madalena's show at the Barnsdall Art Gallery, LA Times art critic William Wilson referenced the early Kandinsky as a predecessor of Madalena.

== Later career ==
In 1928 Mr. Eastman sold his Theatre to the Paramount-Publix chain and the original advertisement scheme was abandoned. That same year Mr. Madalena opened his own commercial art studio where he worked until his retirement in the late 1960s.

== Rediscovery ==
A few weeks after he left the employ of the Eastman Theatre, Madalena happened to pass the building. "I'd been at the Y.M.C.A. for a cup of coffee," he said. '"On my way back, it was raining, and I cut through behind the Theatre. That's when I saw my posters, thrown out with the trash. It made me sore," he said. "They were soaking. They messed up the best ones. I cleaned and saved the ones I could. But later, I couldn't bother with them. I had other things to do." The 225 paintings the artist was able to save remained in storage in Madalena's attic until 1973. With the encouragement of his children Rita and Richard, Madalena entered some of the posters in a local art show in 1975. Los Angeles documentary film maker, Steven Katten, was visiting Rochester that week for a filmmakers' convention. Just as they had been designed to do nearly 50 years before, the posters caught his eye from the sidewalk. "I was struck by them,'" he said. "They were powerful. I went back to Los Angeles, but I found that I kept thinking about these things. Every time I saw another movie poster, I unconsciously compared it to them. After a time, I called Mr. Madalena from Los Angeles and said, 'Listen, let's talk.' " Mr. Katten and his wife, Judith, bought the entire poster collection for an undisclosed sum. Steven and Judith Katten periodically loan the artwork to museums and galleries. They have also donated some of Madalena's work to the Academy of Motion Picture Arts and Sciences.

== Exhibitions ==
Steven and Judith Katten arranged a traveling exhibit of the paintings through the Art Museum Association that ran into 1985. In the March 1986, Hirschl & Adler Galleries of New York City organized the first exhibit of Madalena's work in Manhattan. Exhibitions of Madalena's art at the Academy of Motion Picture Arts and Sciences included a February 1992 showing of 20 paintings and a July 1998 exhibition showcasing 70 of Madalena's posters. In October 2008 the Museum of Modern Art in New York City organized Batiste Madalena: Hand-Painted Film Posters for the Eastman Theatre, 1924–1928, from October 2009 to April 2010. The show included 53 posters along with screenings of some of the films the posters were created to advertise.
