= Battista =

Battista is a given name and surname which means Baptist in Italian.

== Given named ==
- Battista Agnese (died 1564), cartographer from the Republic of Genoa, who worked in the Venetian Republic
- Battista Dossi, also known as Battista de Luteri, Italian painter
- Battista Farina (1893–1966), later Battista Pininfarina, Italian automobile designer and the founder of the Carrozzeria Pininfarina.
- Battista Sforza (1446–1472), Duchess of Urbino and second wife of Federico da Montefeltro

== Surnamed ==
- Bobbie Battista (1952–2020), American journalist
- Giovanni Battista, multiple people
- Miriam Battista (1912–1980), American actress
- Orlando Aloysius Battista (1917–1995), Canadian chemist and author.

== Others ==
- Battista, a Disney character who is Scrooge McDuck's butler.
- Pininfarina Battista, the first car from Automobili Pininfarina

== See also ==
- Baptist (disambiguation)
- Batista (Portuguese/Spanish surname)
- Bautista (Spanish surname) meaning "Baptist"
- Baptista (Portuguese surname) meaning "Baptist"
- Baptiste (name) (French surname and given name) meaning "Baptist"
