= Jason Baptiste =

American entrepreneur and author

Jason L. Baptiste
- Born: Jason L. Baptiste
- Education: University of Miami (BS in computer information systems)
- Occupation: CMO of Onswipe
- Known for: Onswipe
- Website: jasonlbaptiste.com

Jason L. Baptiste is an American entrepreneur and author. He is CMO and chair of Onswipe.

As CEO of Onswipe, Baptiste has received awards and recognition such as being named to Forbes 30 Under 30 in 2011, Bloomberg Businessweek’s Best Young Tech Entrepreneurs in 2011, and the Inc. Magazine 30 Under 30 list in 2011.

In April 2012, the Portfolio imprint of Penguin published Baptiste's first book, The Ultralight Startup.
