= Juan Bautista Medici =

Italian engineer

Juan Bautista Medici was an Italian engineer. He was born in Piedmont Italy in 1843 and died in Buenos Aires in 1903. Three years before his death he was awarded a US patent for construction of navigable channels at the mouth of the Mississippi. Although the patent was never realized, it would have radically reconfigured the delta.

== Career ==
Medici arrived in Argentina around 1870, after working on Italian railways and works for the provision of potable water to the city Montevideo, together with the English engineer Newman. In Buenos Aires, Medici surveyed part of the city, commissioned by the national government. He took other jobs, including the construction of a gas manufacturing plant. Together with Newman, he assumed leadership of city sanitation and built the seawall and Catalinas dam.

Together with Argentine engineer Lavalle, he surveyed and leveled 175.000 square kilometers of Buenos Aires, accompanying the project work with an extensive network of water management channels; two of those channels were navigable. This project was awarded a gold medal at the it:Esposizione italo-americana.

After the city of La Plata was founded in 1882, with Lavalle he proposed the leveling and layout of the new capital as well as the provision of water and sanitation. With Lavalle, he initiated construction of the port of La Plata. He finished that work. He only sanitation works of the Federal Capital, which had begun with Newman and had stopped for financial reasons in 1878. His other works, included water purification installations and outbuildings, and the running water palace, located in Cordoba and Riobamba.

In 1900 he patented a system for construction of navigable channels at the mouth of the Mississippi River. Medici also fostered vineyards the province of San Juan.

He died in Buenos Aires in 1903.

== Sources ==
- Hindle, Richard. "Patent and Place: Intellectual Property and Site-Specificity by…". Forty-Five.
- Estadística., Buenos Aires (Argentina : Province). Dirección General de. Anuario estadístico de la provincia de Buenos Aires ... OCLC 191709008.
- Petriella, Dionisio. Los italianos en la historia del progreso argentino. Buenos Aires: Asociación Dante Alighieri, 1985.
- Hindle, Richard L. (2017-05-04). "Prototyping the Mississippi Delta: Patents, alternative futures, and the design of complex environmental systems" (PDF). Journal of Landscape Architecture. 12 (2): 32–47. doi:10.1080/18626033.2017.1361084. ISSN 1862-6033.
- Hindle, Richard L. (2017-07-03). "Patent Scenarios for the Mississippi River" (PDF). Journal of Architectural Education. 71 (2): 280–285. doi:10.1080/10464883.2017.1340778. ISSN 1046-4883.
