= Jean-Baptiste Boissière =

French lexicographer

Jean-Baptiste-Prudence Boissière (1806–1885) was a French lexicographer born in Valognes, Manche, France. He was the editor of the Dictionnaire analogique de la langue française (Analogical dictionary of French), published by Larousse in 1862. It was, in effect, the first thesaurus of the French language.

== Works under the name Prudence Boissière ==
- Réforme du dictionnaire : Appel à tous les amis de la langue et du progrès, Paris, Bailly, Divry et Cie, 1860.
- Dictionnaire analogique de la langue française : Répertoire complet des mots par les idées et des idées par les mots, Paris, Larousse et A. Boyer, 1862. XI-IV-1439-32 p. Several reprint 9th ed. augm. with many new words and one complement, and a precise of grammar. Paris, Larousse, 1894)
- Du Progrès dans les langues par une direction nouvelle donnée aux travaux des philologues et des académies, Paris, Larousse et Boyer, 1863.
- Clef des Dictionnaires, au moyen de laquelle beaucoup de recherches jusqu’alors à peu près impossibles deviennent faciles dans tous les dictionnaires, Paris, A. Boyer, 1872.
- Canevas d’une philosophie claire et pratique déduite de l’autopsie de l’âme, Paris, l’auteur, 1873.
- La Raison, son mécanisme, ses rapports décroissants avec la vérité, Paris, Larousse, 1873, 72 p.
- La Philosophie du réel fondée sur la réalité localisée et vivante des idées individuelles, Paris, l’auteur, 1875.
- La Pensée, comment et par quoi elle est produite, Paris, l’auteur, 1879.
- Mécanisme de la pensée, Paris, l’auteur, 1883
- Grammaire rationnelle, ou Méthode pour introduire dans l’enseignement de la langue française l’exactitude et la précision des sciences mathématiques, Paris, Mesnage, 1839. 168 p.
- Grammaire graduée, ou Méthode pour introduire l’exactitude et la précision dans l’enseignement de la langue française, Paris, Ducrocq, 1851, 48 p.

== Works under the pseudonym Prudence Sièrebois ==
- Autopsie de l’âme, sa nature, ses modes, sa personnalité, sa durée, Paris, Germer-Baillière, 1865 [réédition en 1873], 174 p.
- Force et faiblesse de la Religion devant le siècle, un moyen pour trancher le nœud et faire enfin triompher la force ou succomber la faiblesse, Paris, F. Cournol, 1865, 104 p.
- La Morale fouillée dans ses fondements : essai d’anthropodicée, Paris, Germer-Baillière, 1866, 428 p.
- Psychologie réaliste : Étude sur les éléments réels de l’âme et de la pensée, Paris, Germer-Baillière, 1876.
