= Baptist University =

Baptist University may refer to:

- California Baptist University, in Riverside, California, US
- Dallas Baptist University, in Dallas, Texas, US
- East Texas Baptist University, in Marshall, Texas, US
- Hong Kong Baptist University, in Kowloon, Hong Kong, China
- Missouri Baptist University, in St. Louis, Missouri, US
- Southwest Baptist University, in Bolivar, Missouri, US
- Ouachita Baptist University, in Arkadelphia, Arkansas, US
- Wayland Baptist University, in Plainview, Texas, US

Baptist University as part of a former name may refer to:

- Atlantic Baptist University (nowadays Crandall University), in New Brunswick, Canada
- Houston Baptist University (nowadays Houston Christian University), in Houston, Texas, US

== See also ==
- Baptist Theological Seminary (disambiguation)
