= Baptiste =

Baptiste may refer to:

- Baptiste (name), a list of people and fictional characters with the given name or surname
- Baptiste, Centre, a commune of Haiti
- Baptiste, Sud, a village in the Aquin commune of Haiti
- Baptiste (TV series), a BBC TV series set in Amsterdam

== See also ==
- Jean-Baptiste
- Batiste (disambiguation)
- Baptist (disambiguation)
