= San Juan Bautista =

San Juan Bautista is the Spanish-language name of Saint John the Baptist. It may refer to:

== Places ==
=== Argentina ===
- San Juan Bautista, Argentina, best known as Florencio Varela

=== Bolivia ===
- San Juan Bautista, Bolivia, Jesuit mission ruins near the village of San Juan de Taperas

=== Chile ===
- San Juan Bautista, Chile, Juan Fernández Islands

=== Guatemala ===
- San Juan Bautista, Suchitepéquez

=== Mexico ===
- San Juan Bautista, Coahuila
- San Juan Bautista, Guerrero
- a mission founded 1699/1700 near Guerrero, Coahuila
- San Juan Bautista, Nayarit
- San Juan Bautista de la Villahermosa, Tabasco
- Misión San Juan Bautista Malibat, Baja California Sur
- Visita de San Juan Bautista Londó, Baja California Sur
- any of several other Spanish missions in Mexico
- San Juan Bautista Atatlahuca, Etla, Valles Centrales, Oaxaca
- San Juan Bautista Coixtlahuaca, Mixteca, Oaxaca
- San Juan Bautista Cuicatlan, Cuicatlan, Cañada, Oaxaca
- San Juan Bautista Guelache, Etla, Valles Centrales, Oaxaca
- San Juan Bautista Jayacatlán, Etla, Valles Centrales, Oaxaca
- San Juan Bautista lo de Soto, Jamiltepec, Costa, Oaxaca.
- San Juan Bautista de Sonora, Cumpas, Sonora
- San Juan Bautista Suchitepec, Huajuapan, Mixteca, Oaxaca
- San Juan Bautista Tlacoatzintepec, Cuicatlan, Cañada, Oaxaca
- San Juan Bautista Tlachichilco, Silacayoapam, Mixteca, Oaxaca
- San Juan Bautista Tuxtepec, Oaxaca
- San Juan Bautista Valle Nacional, Tuxtepec, Papaloapan, Oaxaca

=== Oceania ===
- Pitcairn Islands, one of which was named "San Juan Bautista" by Pedro Fernandes de Queirós in 1606

=== Paraguay ===
- San Juan Bautista, Paraguay
- San Juan Bautista de Ñeembucú, Ñeembucú
- Roman Catholic Diocese of San Juan Bautista de las Misiones, suffragan of Asunción

=== Peru ===
- San Juan Bautista District, Maynas, Loreto Region
- San Juan Bautista District, Ica, Ica Region
- San Juan Bautista, Ica, capital of the aforementioned district
- San Juan Bautista District, Huamanga, Ayacucho Region
- San Juan Bautista, Huamanga, capital of the aforementioned district

=== Puerto Rico ===
- The original name of Puerto Rico
- San Juan, Puerto Rico, a truncation of its complete name Municipio de la Ciudad Capital San Juan Bautista
- Cathedral of San Juan Bautista in Puerto Rico (Catholic Church)
- Catedral San Juan Bautista (San Juan de Puerto Rico) (Episcopal Church)
- Iglesia de San Juan Bautista (Maricao, Puerto Rico)
- San Juan Bautista School of Medicine, Caguas, Puerto Rico
- Iglesia San Juan Bautista y San Ramón Nonato, Juana Díaz, Puerto Rico
- Old San Juan, Puerto Rico

=== Spain ===
- San Juan Bautista (Madrid), an area in the city of Madrid.
- Sant Joan de Labritja, a village and municipality in Ibiza / Eivissa, Balearic Islands.
- San Juan Bautista de Corias, a monastery in Corias (Narcea), Asturias
- Iglesia de San Juan Bautista (San Tirso de Abres), Asturias
- Church of San Juan Bautista, Baños de Cerrato, Palencia
- Santiuste de San Juan Bautista, Segovia, Castile and León
- Castle of St John the Baptist (Castillo de San Juan Bautista), Santa Cruz de Tenerife, Canary Islands
- Church of San Juan Bautista (Talamanca de Jarama), Talamanca de Jarama
- Church of San Juan Bautista (Arganda del Rey)
- Iglesia de San Juan Bautista (Chiclana de la Frontera), Chiclana de la Frontera

=== United States ===
- Mission San Juan Bautista, San Benito County, California, officially "La Misión del Glorios Precursor de Jesu Cristo, Nuestro Señor, San Juan Bautista"
- San Juan Bautista, California
- Rancho San Juan Bautista, Santa Clara County, California
- San Juan County, Washington (formally San Juan Bautista County, named for Saint John the Baptist)

=== Venezuela ===
- San Juan Bautista, Nueva Esparta
- Pao de San Juan Bautista Municipality, Cojedes
- John the Baptist Monument, San Juan de los Morros, Guárico, Venezuela

== Other uses ==
- San Juan Bautista (Mutsen) a native people and language in California
- Japanese warship San Juan Bautista, built in 1613
- Spanish warship San Juan Bautista, a Spanish 60-gun ship 1724-1741
- Church of San Juan Bautista (disambiguation)

== See also ==
- Bautista
- San Juan (disambiguation)
- Saint-Jean-Baptiste (disambiguation)
- St. John the Baptist (disambiguation)
