= Iglesia de San Juan =

Iglesia de San Juan may refer to:

- Iglesia de San Juan (Alevia), a church in Asturias, Spain
- Iglesia de San Juan (Amandi), a church in Asturias, Spain
- Iglesia de San Juan (Camoca), a church in Asturias, Spain
- Iglesia de San Juan (Ciliergo), a church in Asturias, Spain
- Iglesia de San Juan (Priorio), a church in Asturias, Spain
- Church of San Juan (Salvatierra), Iglesia de San Juan in Spanish

== See also ==
- Iglesia de San Juan Bautista (disambiguation)
