= Iglesia de San Juan Bautista =

Iglesia de San Juan Bautista may refer to:

== Spain ==
- Iglesia de San Juan Bautista (Arganda del Rey)
- Iglesia de San Juan Bautista (Chiclana de la Frontera), Andalusia, Spain
- Iglesia de San Juan Bautista (Jodra del Pinar)
- Iglesia de San Juan Bautista (San Tirso de Abres), Asturias, Spain
- Iglesia de San Juan Bautista (Talamanca de Jarama)
- Iglesia de San Juan Bautista (Vélez-Málaga)
- Iglesia de San Juan Bautista, Baños de Cerrato

== Puerto Rico, U.S. territory ==
- Iglesia de San Juan Bautista (Maricao, Puerto Rico), Maricao, Puerto Rico
