= Church of San Juan Bautista =

Church of San Juan Bautista may refer to:

- Church of San Juan Bautista (Alatoz)
- Church of San Juan Bautista (Arganda del Rey)
- Church of San Juan Bautista (Jodra del Pinar)
- Church of San Juan Bautista (Ohkay Owingeh)
- Church of San Juan Bautista (Talamanca de Jarama)
- Church of San Juan Bautista, Dalcahue
- Church of San Juan Bautista, Baños de Cerrato
- Iglesia de San Juan Bautista (Maricao, Puerto Rico)
- Iglesia San Juan Bautista y San Ramón Nonato, Juana Díaz, Puerto Rico
- San Juan Bautista Church (Calumpit)
