= Saint John the Baptist (disambiguation) =

John the Baptist is venerated as a saint in Christianity.

Saint John the Baptist may also refer to:

== Art ==
- Saint John the Baptist (Alonso Cano), a sculpture by Alonso Cano
- Saint John the Baptist (Caravaggio), at least eight paintings by Caravaggio
- Saint John the Baptist (Donatello), a sculpture by Donatello
- Saint John the Baptist (Ghiberti), a sculpture by Lorenzo Ghiberti
- Saint John the Baptist (El Greco), a painting by El Greco
- Saint John the Baptist (Leonardo), a painting by Leonardo da Vinci
- Saint John the Baptist (Preti), a painting by Mattia Preti
- Saint John the Baptist (Rodin), a sculpture by Auguste Rodin
- Saint John the Baptist (Titian), a painting by Titian

== Other uses ==
- St. John the Baptist Parish, Louisiana, United States

== See also ==
- Saint John the Baptist Church (disambiguation)
- Saint John (disambiguation)
- San Giovanni Battista (disambiguation)
- San Juan Bautista (disambiguation)
- Saint-Jean-Baptiste (disambiguation)
