= Saint Nicholas (Preti) =

Painting by Mattia Preti

Saint Nicholas (c. 1653) by Mattia Preti

Saint Nicholas is a c. 1653 painting by Mattia Preti, the first work he produced after moving to Naples and showing the three gold balls which are a traditional attribute of the saint. It is now in the Museo nazionale di Capodimonte in the same city. He also produced a larger version of the work in 1657 which is now in the Pinacoteca civica in Fano, with an early copy after the Capodimonte version now in the church of Santa Teresa degli Scalzi in Naples.

== History ==
The first archival reference to the work is in a document dated 20 December 1653 in which Isabella Gallo pays the artist 40 ducats to settle a fee (agreed at a total of 50 ducats) for a painting of Nicholas of Bari. She wanted the painting for the church of San Domenico Soriano, the centre of the Calabrian community in Naples and a church for which Preti also painted dome frescoes, destroyed during the 19th century. It was placed in the Gallo-Coscia chapel, which was dedicated to Saint Nicholas and had been bought for 150 ducats by Isabella on the death of her husband Domenico Coscia, a native of Catanzaro.

When the religious order was suppressed in 1806, the work and Preti's Saint John the Baptist and Judith and Holofernes from the same church were added to the Real Museo Borbonico in the Palazzo dei Regi Studi (on what is now the site of the National Archaeological Museum of Naples). In 1843 the Saint Nicholas was engraved and published in all the guidebooks to the city, becoming one of the best-known works in the Bourbon collections. It was highly appreciated by 19th and 20th century art historians and painters, who praised its chiaroscuro - Roberto Longhi wrote of it "Preti's creation is the harmonic outcropping of mass along main planes of light".

== Bibliography ==
- (in Italian) Nicola Spinosa, Mattia Preti. Tra Roma, Napoli e Malta, Napoli, Electa, 1999, ISBN 978-8851001292.
- (in Italian) N. Spinosa, Pittura del Seicento a Napoli - da Mattia Preti a Luca Giordano, natura in posa, Napoli, Arte'm, 2010.
