= St. Jean Baptiste =

"St. Jean Baptiste" is French for John the Baptist. It is used in the names of some churches and places, and two other saints have names derived from him.

- St. Jean-Baptiste de la Salle, the patron saint of teachers.
- John Vianney, the patron saint of priests, sometimes styled St. Jean Baptiste Mary Vianney

== Churches ==
- St. Jean Baptiste Catholic Church, in New York City
  - St. Jean Baptiste High School, run by the church

== Places ==
- St. Jean Baptiste, Manitoba

== Other ==
- June 24 is celebrated as the Saint-Jean-Baptiste Day public holiday in Quebec, also known as the Fête nationale
- See places with the name Saint-Jean-Baptiste
