= Saint John the Baptist (Preti) =

Painting by Mattia Preti

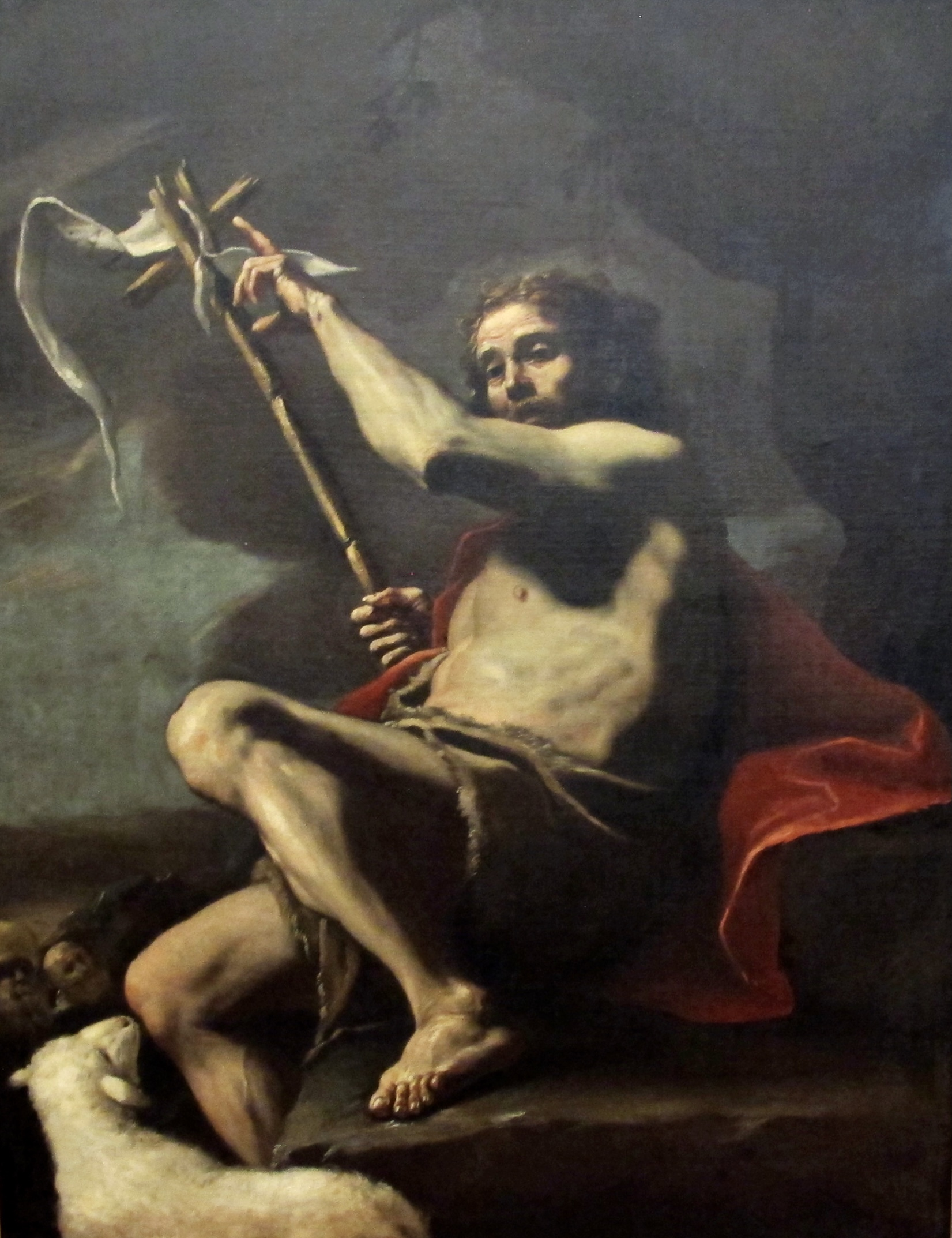
Saint John the Baptist (c. 1653-1656) by Mattia Preti

Saint John the Baptist is a c. 1653-1656 oil on canvas painting by Mattia Preti, now in the Museo nazionale di Capodimonte in Naples.

It shows the saint in a pose that became typical in Preti's work, using foreshortening, chiaroscuro, and several red colours, especially in the saint's cloak. He had already used this treatment of the human figure in the lunette frescoes at the church of San Biagio in Modena, whose Saint John the Baptist seems to be a prototype for the work now in Naples. That treatment later reached its apogee in his Saint Sebastian, produced for the church of Santa Maria ad Ogni Bene dei Sette Dolori and now also in the Museo di Capodimonte.

== History ==
The work's provenance is identical to that of the same artist's Judith and Holofernes. The first written reference to it is in the 1659 will of the Calabrian lawyer Domenico di Somma, which mistakes its subject for Judith. It was then inherited by di Somma's friend, collaborator and fellow Calabrian, Antonino Laratta. Di Somma and Laratta were both Preti's lawyers during the painter's argument with the fathers of the church of Sant'Andrea della Valle in Rome. On Laratta's death in 1685 both paintings were left to the church of San Domenico Soriano in Naples, as di Somma had stipulated before his death - that church was the centre of the Calabrian community in Naples. The two works were placed on the side walls of the chapel where di Somma was buried, immediately to the right of the high altar.

When the religious order was suppressed in 1806, these two paintings and a Saint Nicholas (Preti's first work in Naples, initially produced for the Gallo-Coscia chapel but by 1806 in San Domenico Soriano) were moved into the Bourbon collection in Palazzo dei Regi Studi - the Saint Nicholas was exhibited there immediately, but the Judith and Saint John were initially placed in the collection's stores, with restoration to the support of Saint John in 1839, and both works were finally exhibited in 1870.

== Bibliography ==
- (in Italian) Nicola Spinosa, Mattia Preti. Tra Roma, Napoli e Malta, Napoli, Electa, 1999, ISBN 978-8851001292.
- (in Italian) N. Spinosa, Pittura del Seicento a Napoli - da Mattia Preti a Luca Giordano, natura in posa, Napoli, Arte'm, 2010.
