= Alatoz =

Coordinates: 39°06′N 1°21′W

- municipality
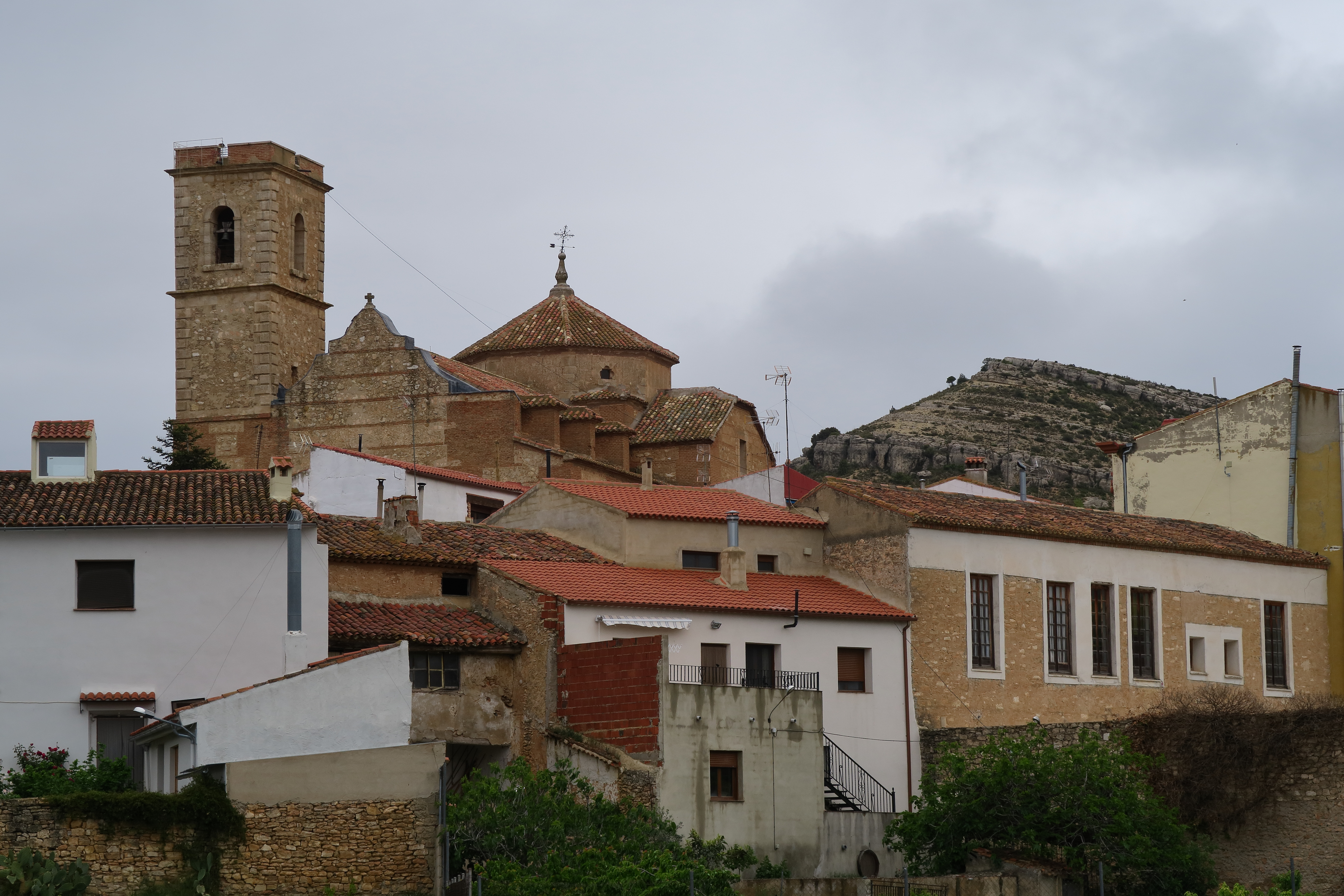

- Coat of arms

- Country: Spain
- Autonomous community: Castile-La Mancha
- Province: Albacete
- Comarca: Manchuela

Area
  - Total: 63.8 km^{2} (24.6 sq mi)
- Elevation: 860 m (2,820 ft)

Population (2025-01-01)
  - Total: 504
  - Density: 7.90/km^{2} (20.5/sq mi)
- Time zone: UTC+1 (CET)
  - Summer (DST): UTC+2 (CEST)
- Climate: Csa

Alatoz is a municipality in Albacete, Castile-La Mancha, Spain. It has a population of 531.

== See also ==
- Manchuela
- Church of San Juan Bautista (Alatoz)
