= Iglesia de San Juan (Amandi) =

Coordinates: 43.4692°N 5.4419°W

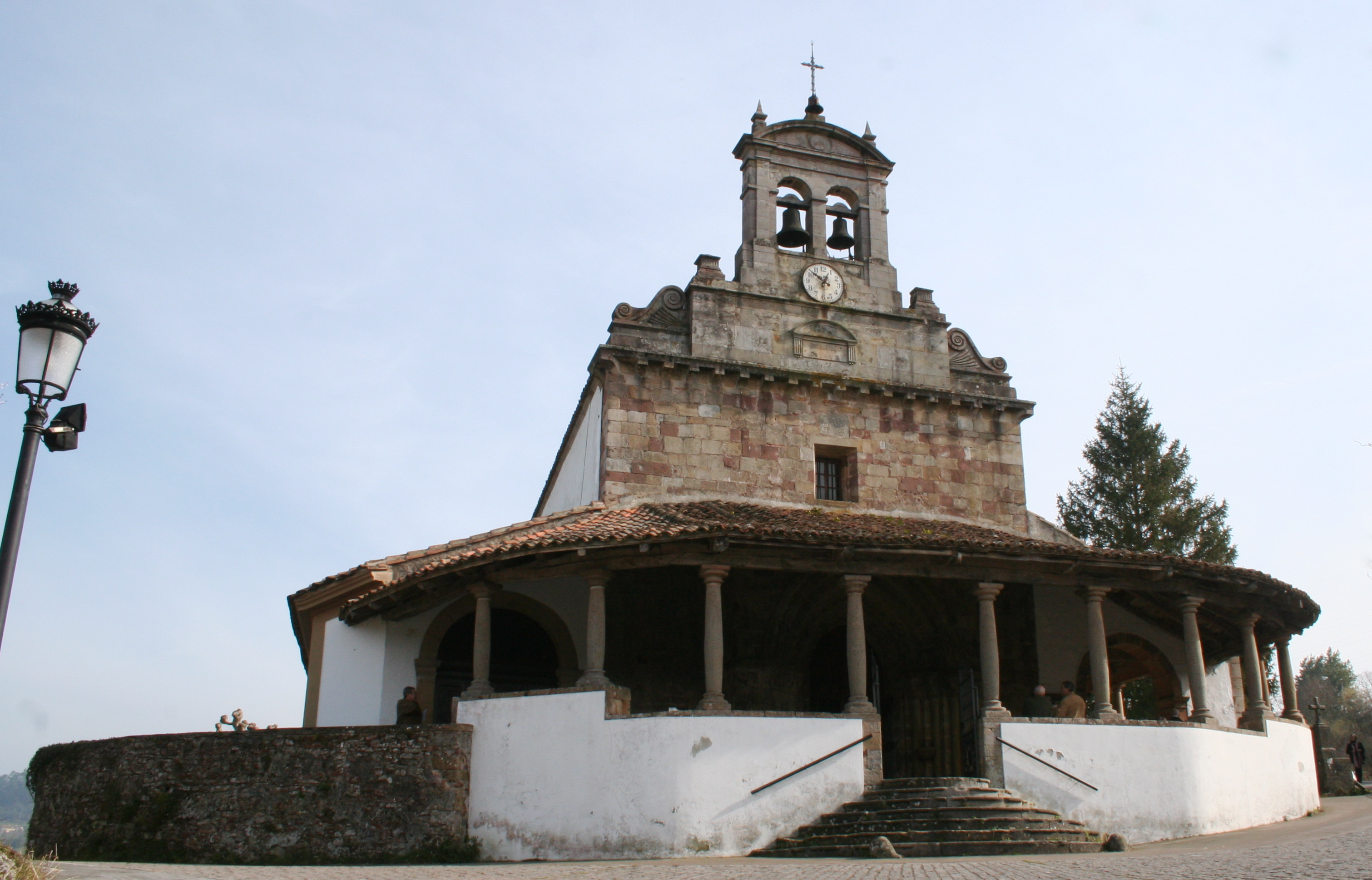
- Iglesia de San Juan (Amandi)
- Location: Asturias, Spain

Iglesia de San Juan (Amandi) is a church in Asturias, Spain. It was established in the 13th century.

== See also ==
- Asturian art
- Catholic Church in Spain
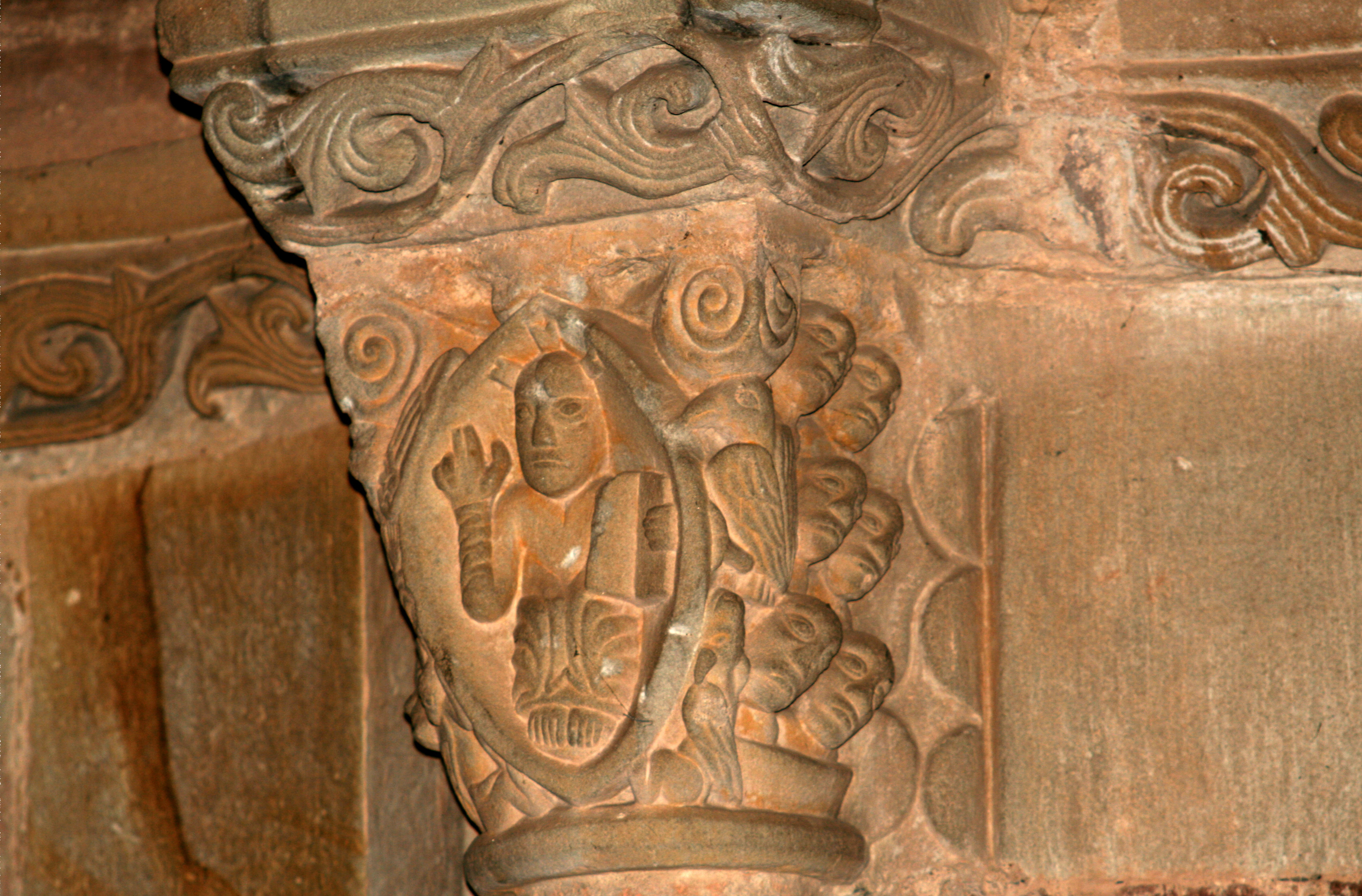
Capitel

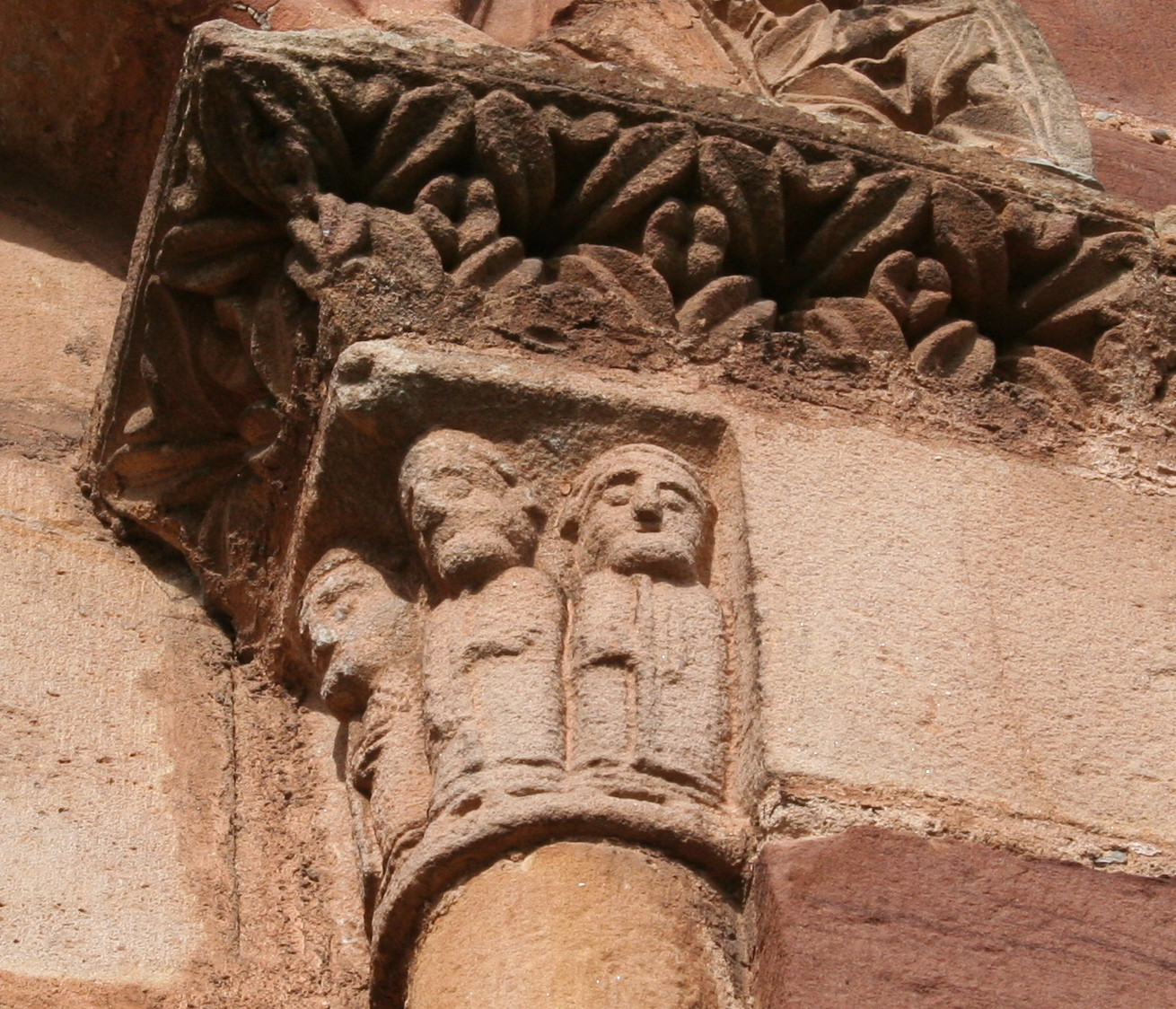

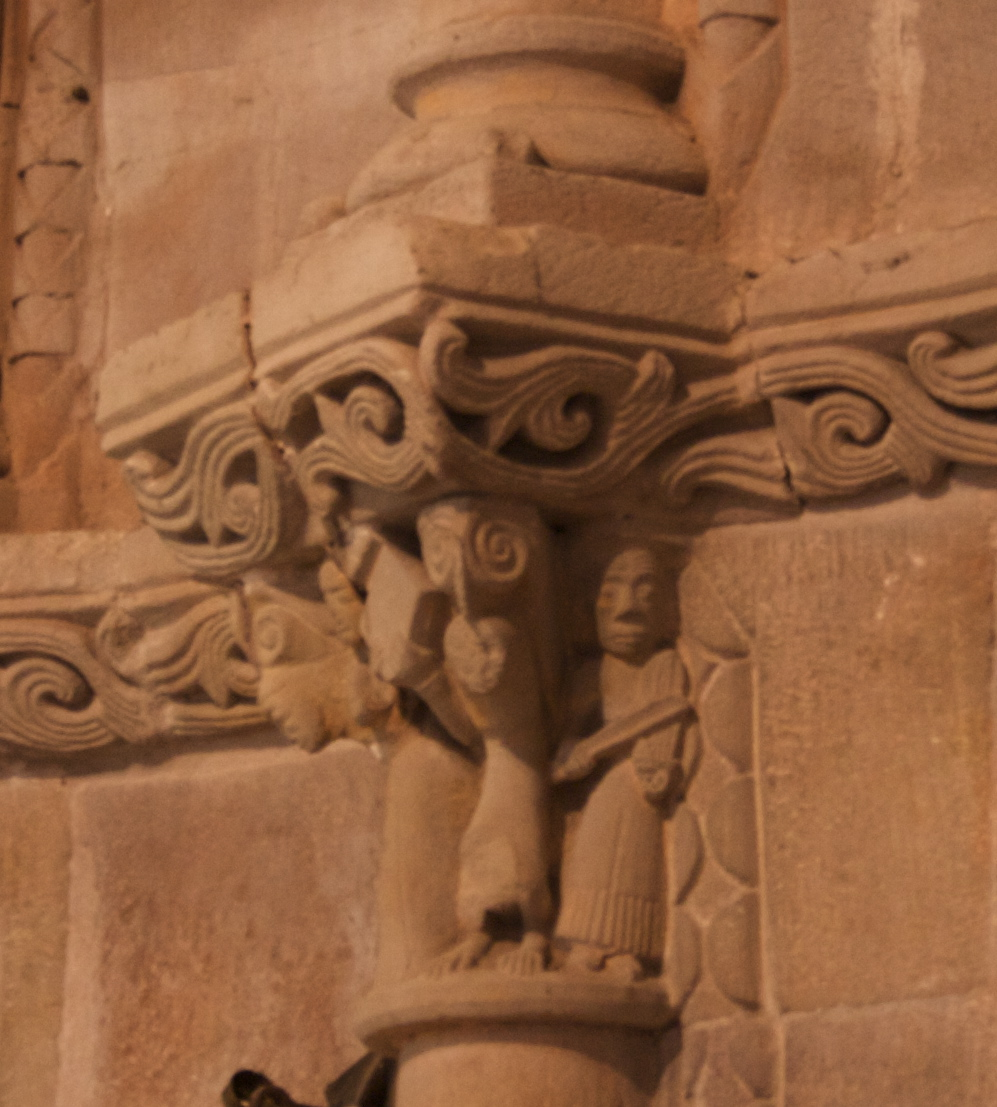

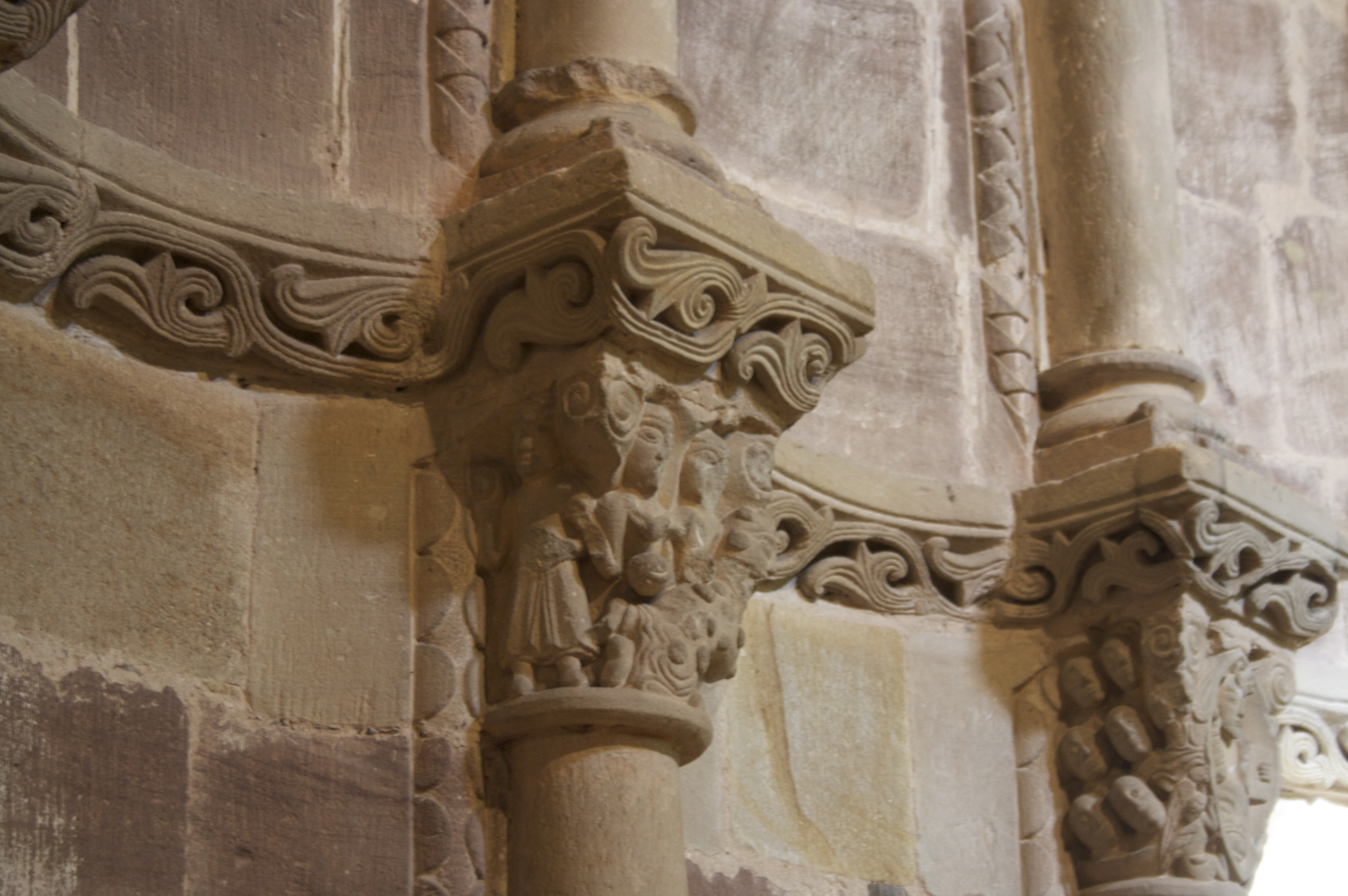

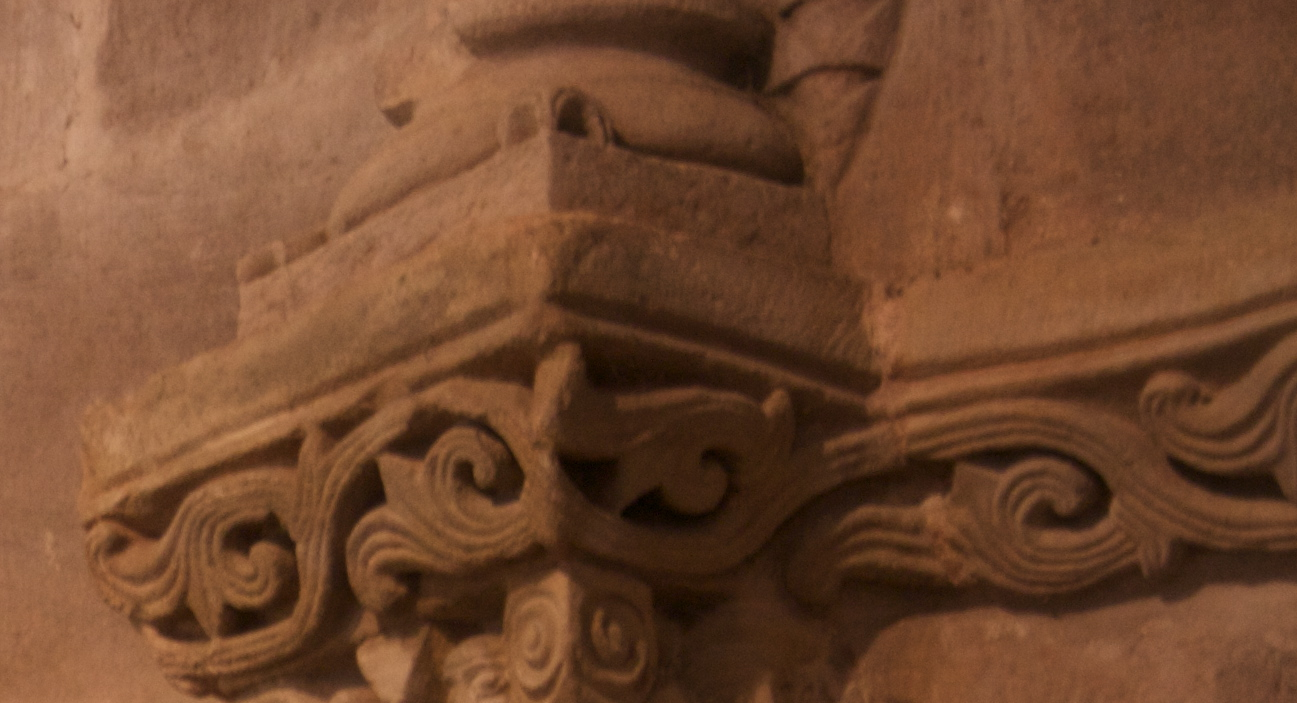

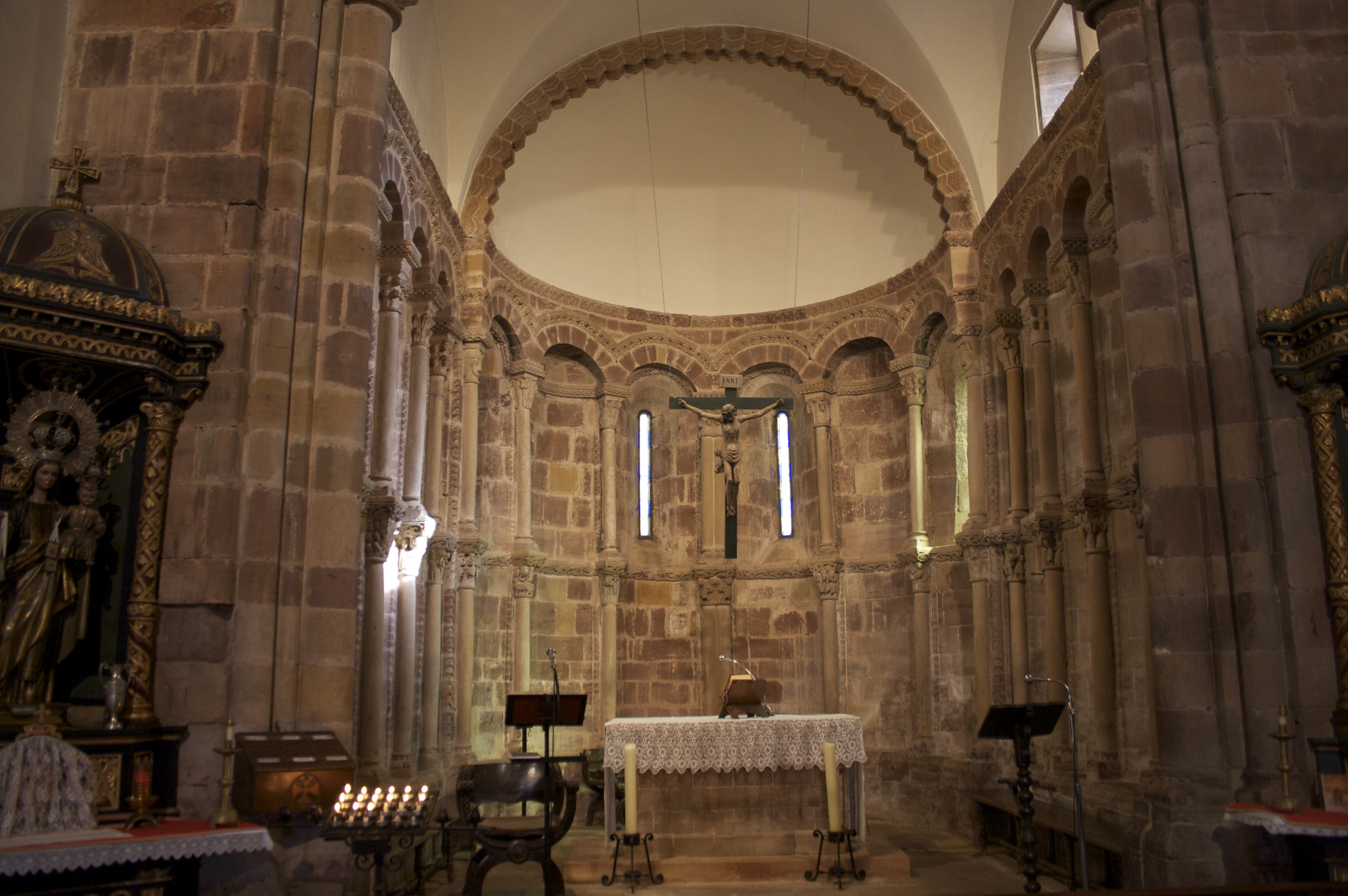

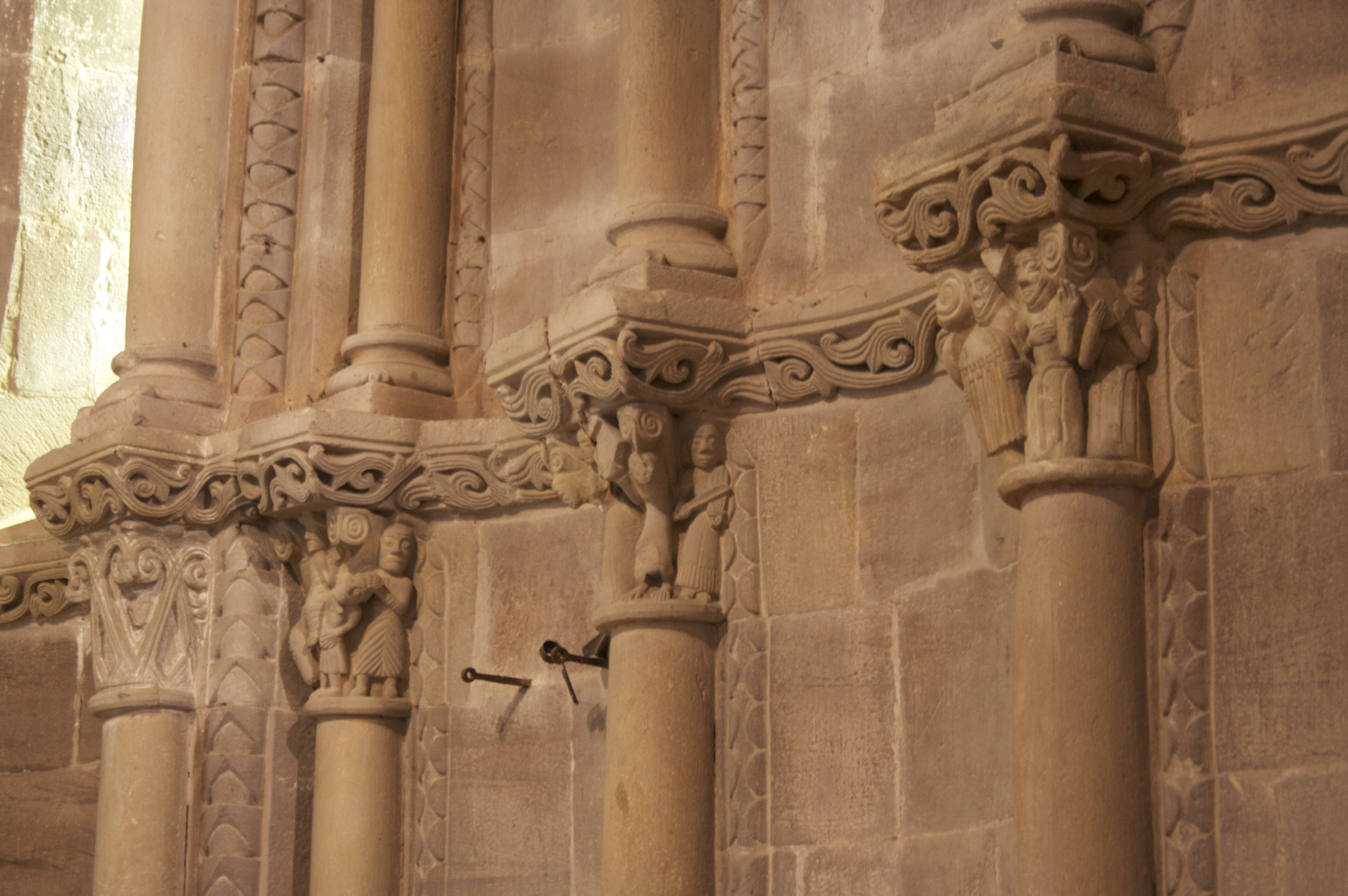

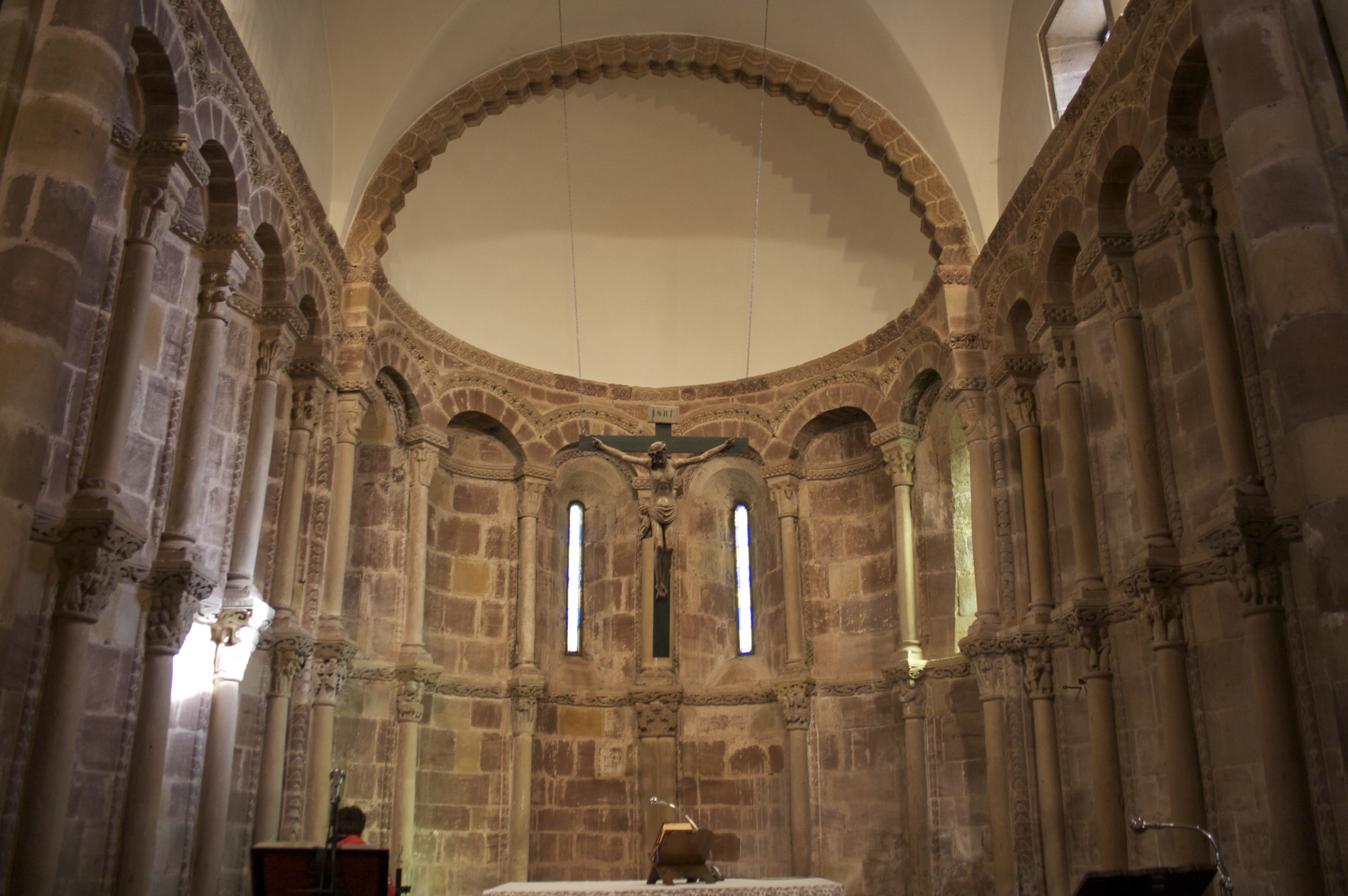

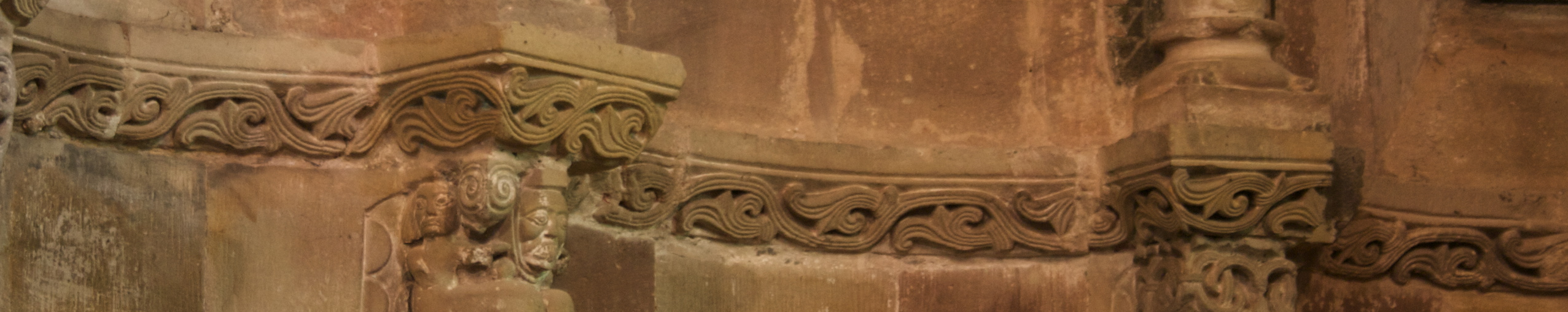
