= Church of San Juan Bautista (Alatoz) =

- Iglesia Parroquial de San Juan Bautista (Spanish)
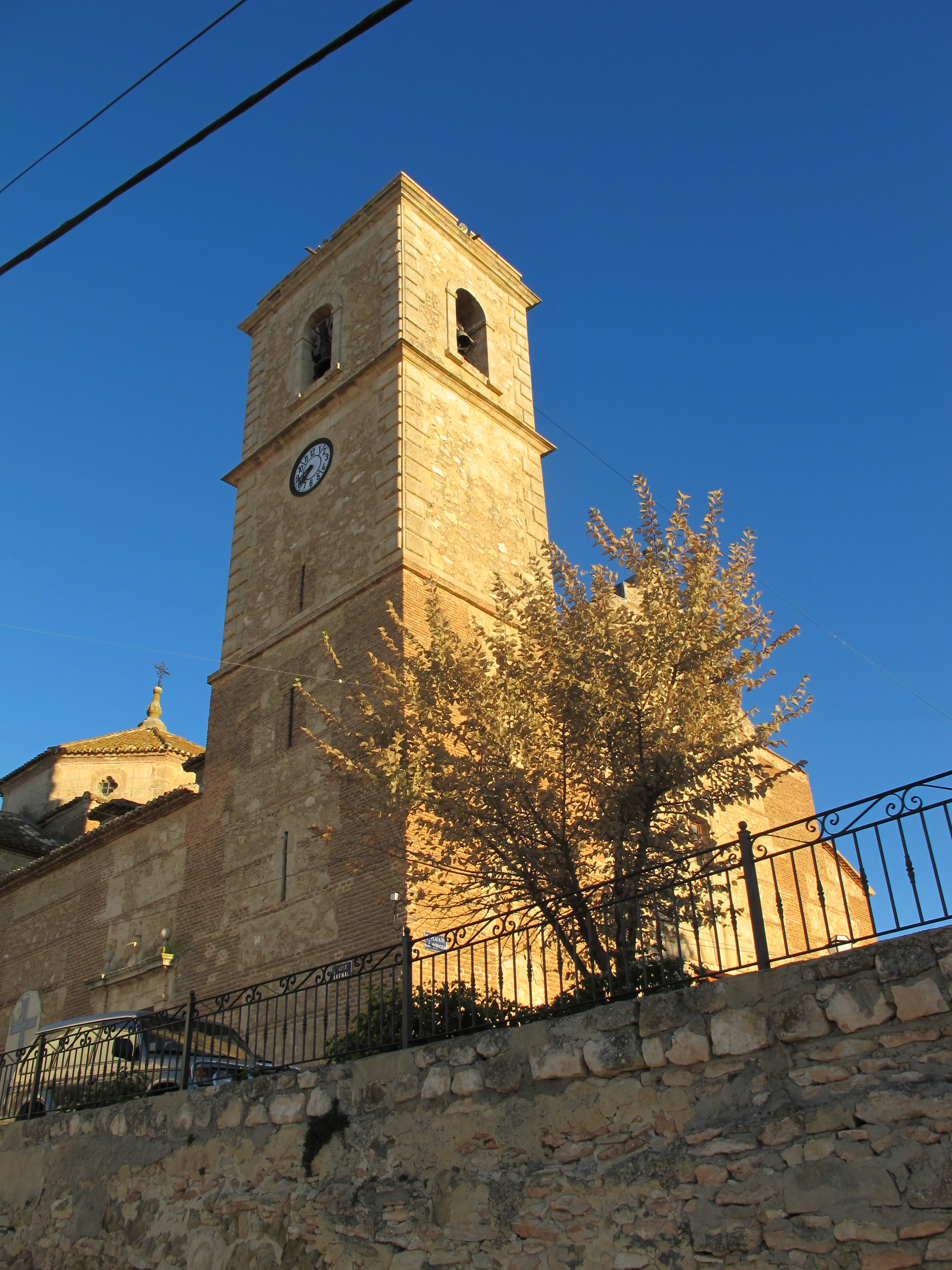

- Location within Spain
- 39.09496°N 1.360648°W
- Location: Alatoz, Spain

Spanish Cultural Heritage
- Official name: Iglesia Parroquial de San Juan Bautista
- Type: Non-movable
- Criteria: Monument
- Designated: 1991
- Reference no.: RI-51-0007103

The Church of San Juan Bautista (Spanish: Iglesia Parroquial de San Juan Bautista) is a Roman Catholic church located in Alatoz, Spain. It was declared Bien de Interés Cultural in 1991.

The neoclassical-style church was erected 1761–1776.
