= Iglesia de San Juan (Priorio) =

Coordinates: 43°20′08″N 5°55′26″W

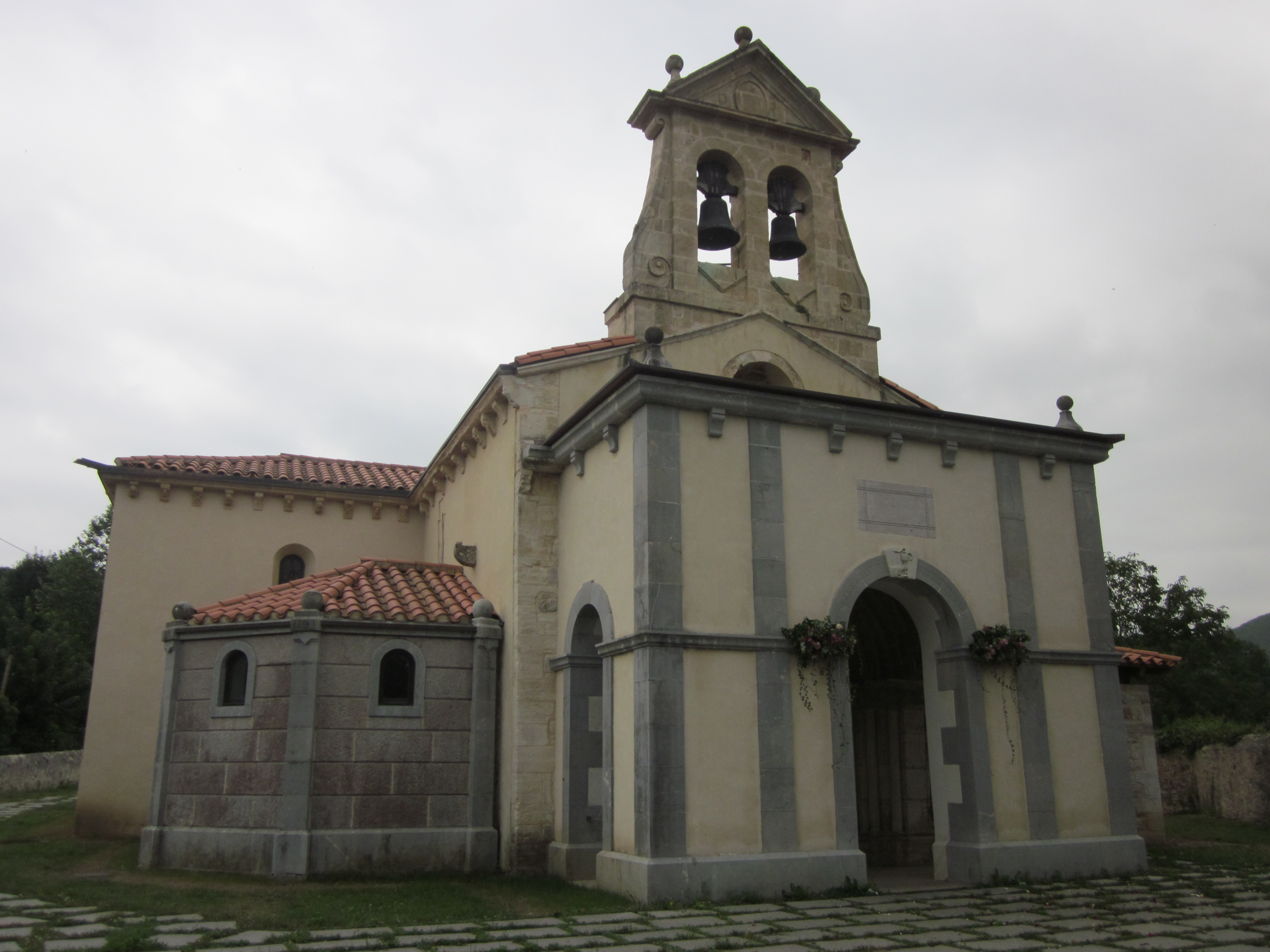
- Church of San Juan de Priorio
- Iglesia de San Juan (Priorio)
- Location: Las Caldas, Oviedo, Asturias
- Country: Spain

Iglesia de San Juan (Priorio) is a church in Asturias, Spain. It was established in the 12th century.

== See also ==
- Asturian art
- Catholic Church in Spain
