= Iglesia de San Juan (Camoca) =

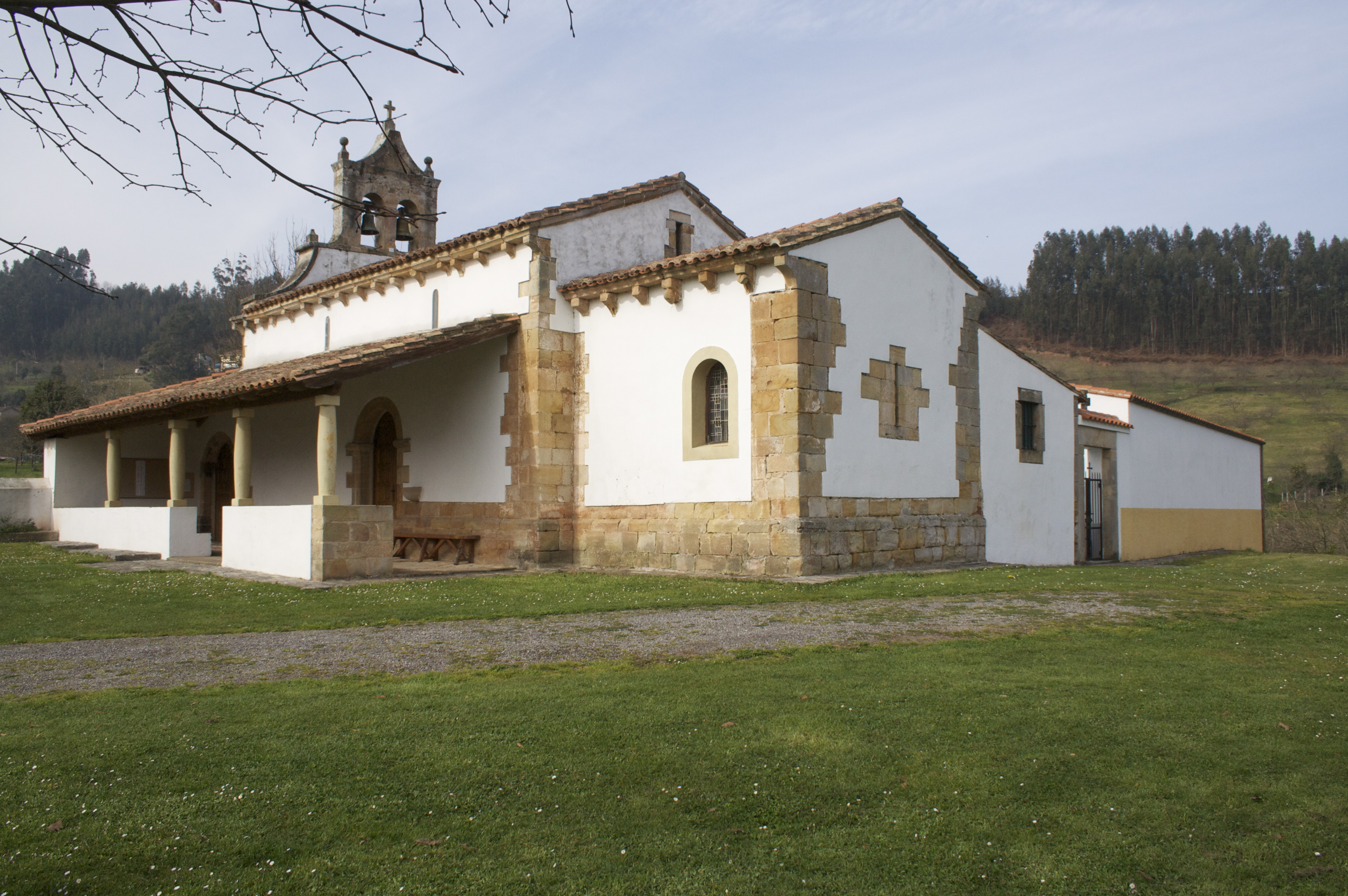
- Iglesia de San Juan (Camoca)
- 43.4601°N 5.47135°W
- Location: Asturias, Spain

Iglesia de San Juan (Camoca) is a church in Asturias, Spain. It was established in the 13th century.

== See also ==
- Asturian art
- Catholic Church in Spain
