= John the Baptist Monument =

- Monumento a San Juan Bautista
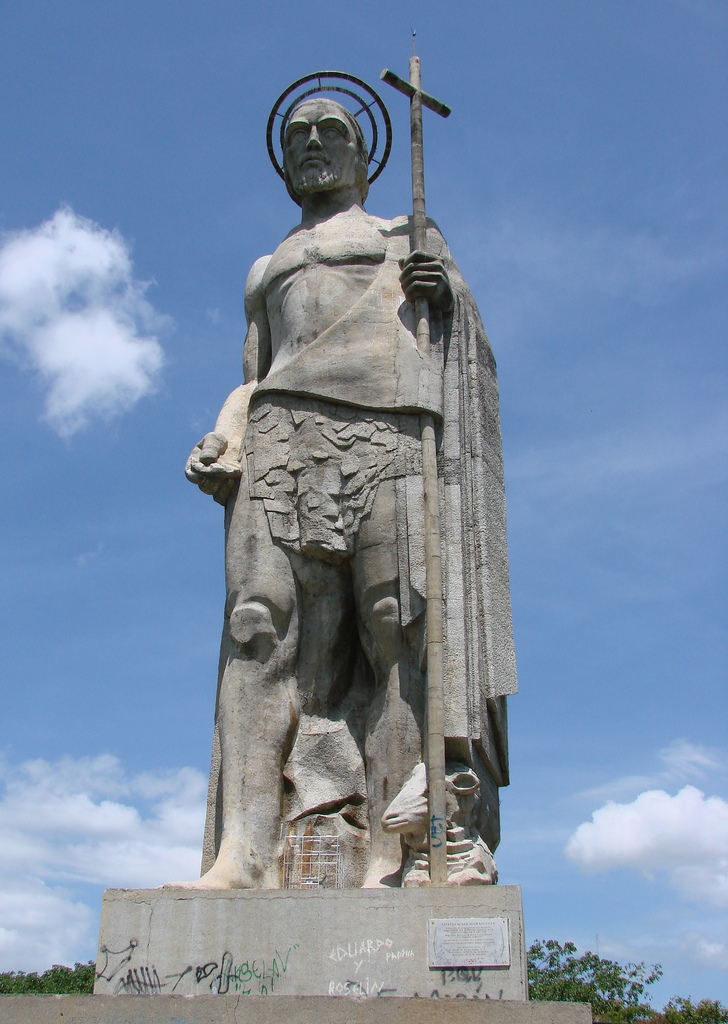
- The monument in June, 2008
- Interactive map of John the Baptist Monument
- Location: San Juan de los Morros, Guárico, Venezuela
- Coordinates: 9°20′53″N 70°27′50″W
- Type: statue
- Material: Concrete
- Height: 19.8 m (65 ft)
- Beginning date: 1933
- Completion date: 1935
- Opening date: December 21, 1935

The John the Baptist Monument is a 19.8-meter (62.3 ft) concrete statue in downtown San Juan de los Morros, Guárico state, Venezuela, erected in honor of John the Baptist. Commonly called San Juanote, it's one of the highest statues in Venezuela. It was built by the command of Venezuelan dictator Juan Vicente Gómez in 1933 as a present to the city when it was declared the capital of Guárico State. The monument was carved in the hills of Calabozo and moved to San Juan in 1935.

San Juan de los Morros and its monument to the Baptist are located in a large geographical area which contact the foothills of the central Venezuelan Coastal Range and lowlands region of the Venezuelan Llanos.

Sanjuanote sits atop the El Calvario hill, a small promontory in the center of the city. The statue is surrounded by concrete lions and old cannons that serve as gatekeepers in a symbolic protective attitude around the monument.

== See also ==
- St. John the Baptist (Ghiberti)
- List of tallest statues
