= Saint-Jean-Baptiste =

Saint-Jean-Baptiste may refer to:

- Saint-Jean-Baptiste, the National Holiday of Quebec celebrated on 24 June
- Saint-Jean-Baptiste, Quebec City, a neighbourhood of Quebec City
- Saint-Jean-Baptiste, Quebec, a municipality in the Montérégie region of Quebec
- Saint-Jean-Baptiste, Quebec, a former municipality in the Bas-Saint-Laurent region of Quebec that is now part of Mont-Joli, Quebec
- Saint-Jean-Baptiste-de-Restigouche, New Brunswick, Canada
- Saint-Jean-Baptiste Society (Société Saint-Jean-Baptiste), institution in Quebec dedicated to protection of francophone interests
- Alès Cathedral, short for Cathédrale Saint-Jean-Baptiste d'Alès, Catholic cathedral and national monument in Alès, France
- Bazas Cathedral, short for Cathédrale Saint-Jean-Baptiste de Bazas, Catholic cathedral and national monument in Bazas, Gironde, France

== See also ==
- Jean-Baptiste
- Baptiste (disambiguation)
- Saint-Jean (disambiguation)
- San Juan Bautista (disambiguation)
- St. John the Baptist (disambiguation)
