= Iglesia de San Juan (Ciliergo) =

Church in Asturias, Spain

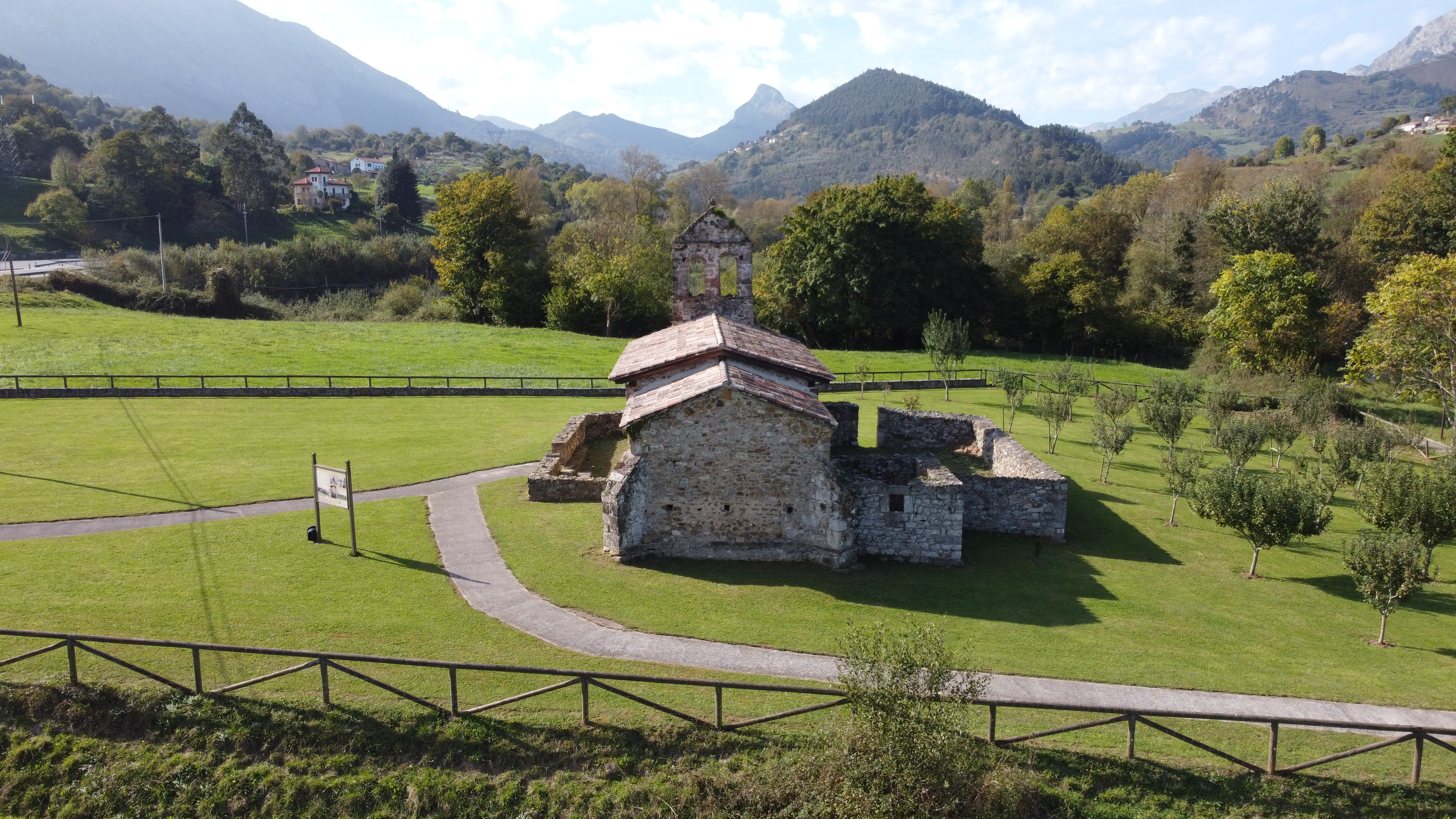
- Iglesia de San Juan in 2021
- Iglesia de San Juan (Ciliergo)
- 43°19′15.05″N 4°35′30.77″W
- Location: Panes, Asturias
- Country: Spain
- Denomination: Roman Catholic

Architecture
- Architectural type: Church
- Style: Romanesque

Iglesia de San Juan is a Catholic church in Asturias, Spain. It was established in the late 13th century.

== See also ==
- Asturian art
- Catholic Church in Spain
