= Church of San Juan Bautista (Jodra del Pinar) =

- Iglesia de San Juan Bautista (Spanish)
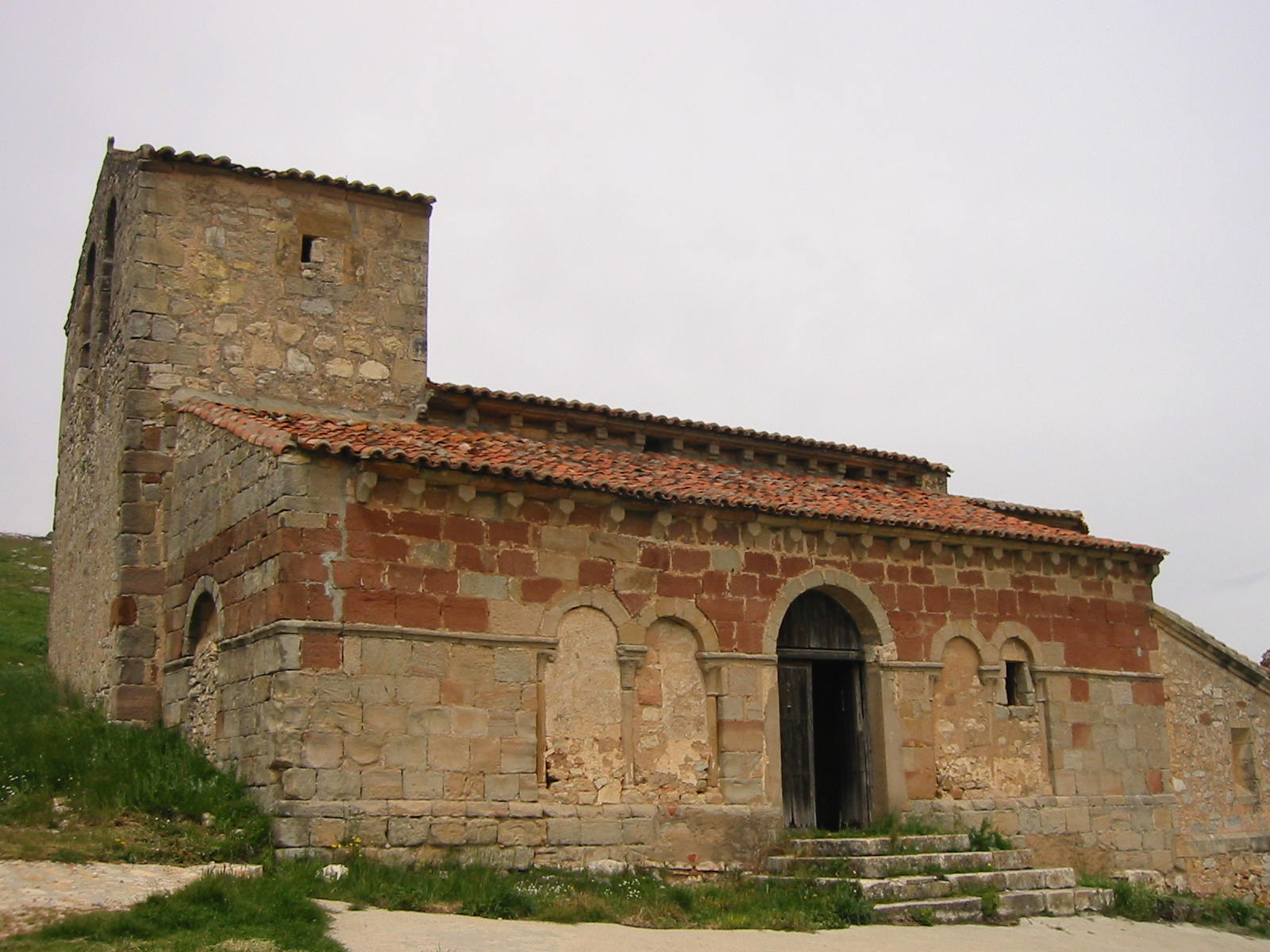

- Location within Spain
- 41.044972°N 2.557358°W
- Location: Saúca, Spain

Spanish Cultural Heritage
- Official name: Iglesia de San Juan Bautista
- Type: Non-movable
- Criteria: Monument
- Designated: 1990
- Reference no.: RI-51-0006977

The Church of San Juan Bautista (Spanish: Iglesia de San Juan Bautista, also known as the Iglesia de San Juan Degollado, where degollado means "beheaded") is a Catholic church dedicated to St John the Baptist that is located in the village of Jodra del Pinar in Saúca, Spain. It was declared a Property of Cultural Interest (Spanish: Bien de Interés Cultural) in 1990.
