= Iglesia de San Juan (Alevia) =

Coordinates: 43.3352°N 4.5974°W

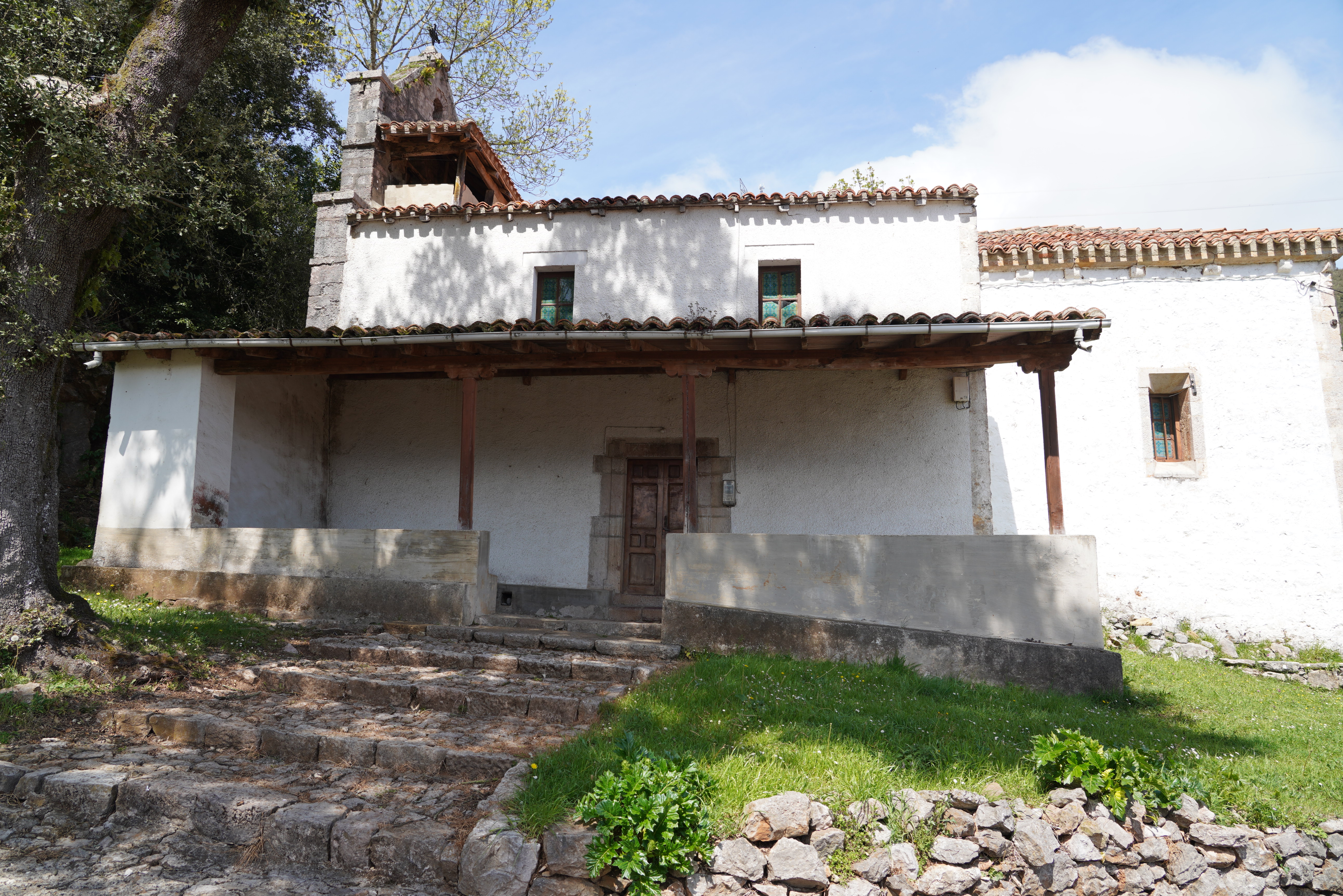
- Iglesia de San Juan (Alevia)
- Location: Asturias, Spain

History
- Dedication: St John the Baptist

The church of San Juan is in the village of Alevia, Asturias, Spain. Founded in the late 14th century, the building is currently a Baroque temple with remnants of the original Gothic construction. There is a Gothic nave with side porch and double chapel on the north side.

== See also ==
- Asturian art
- Catholic Church in Spain
