= Saint John the Baptist (Ghiberti) =

Sculpture by Lorenzo Ghiberti

Coordinates: 43°46′14.29″N 11°15′18.89″E

St. John the Baptist
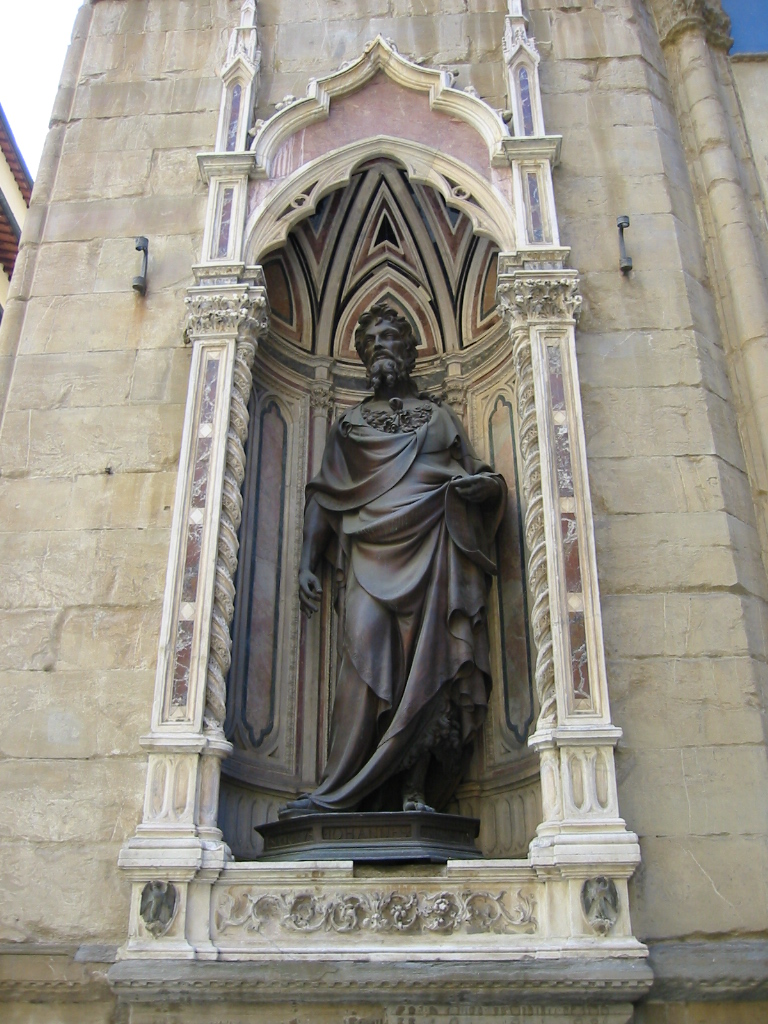
- Artist: Lorenzo Ghiberti
- Year: 1412–1416
- Type: Bronze
- Dimensions: 255 cm (100 in)
- Location: Orsanmichele, Florence

St. John the Baptist (1412–1416) is a bronze statue by Lorenzo Ghiberti located in one of the 14 niches of the Orsanmichele in Florence, Italy. The statue of the Saint was commissioned by the cloth merchant's guild, the Arte di Calimala. The artist's use of unnaturalistic but elegant curves in the hair and drapery of the saint show the influence of the International Gothic style prevalent in Italy at the time the work was created. The work was successfully cast in a single piece, making it the first bronze statue of its size to be cast in a single piece for at least several hundred years in Italy.

== Background ==
After winning the competition for the doors of the Baptistery in 1402 and completing the commission, Ghiberti was commissioned with three sculptures to fill exterior niches at Orsanmichele. The first of these was St. John the Baptist (1412–1416), followed by St. Matthew (1419–1420) and St. Stephen (1428). The sculpture of St. John was the only one commissioned by Arte di Calimala, the merchant guild. The power and influence associated with this guild dictated, at least to some degree, the form which the final work would take. More specifically, in 1406, the Florence City Council passed a decree granting major guilds the power to use bronze, a far more costly material than the traditional stone, for their commissioned projects. After the execution of the bronze Baptistery doors, the construction of which was also overseen by the Calimala guild, the guild was eager to fund another equally impressive project.

The completion of this project set off a wave of demand for bronze statuary. This benefited Ghiberti immensely, as both of his later sculptures were commissioned in bronze.

== The statue ==
Ghiberti's St. John was the largest statue ever cast in Florence up to that point. From its base, it rises 2.55 meters, and sits in an arched Gothic niche. The hollow cast, the thinness of the bronze, and a comparison with his later St. Matthew all indicate that this sculpture was cast in one piece from a wax and clay model. The exceptional detail of the goatskin cloak, the beard and the hair accompany of series of optical corrections. The pronounced cheekbones, the forehead that recedes sharply at the temples, and the slightly furrowed brow that overhangs the deeply inset eyes are examples of this practice that allowed sculptors to construct sited works that would generally be seen from below, rather than from straight ahead.

== Legacy ==
One of Ghiberti's greatest challenges, and ultimately one of his greatest triumphs, with the St. John was the need to cast as large and as masterful a sculpture in bronze as was routinely produced in stone. Though he had used bronze before (such as on the Baptistery doors), all of his previous work had been on a much smaller scale, and more the work of a craftsman. The constraints on the size of bronze sculpture, teamed with the non-monumental customs of the International Gothic style, presented Ghiberti with the challenge of making a work that both befitted its site and meshed in with the other works at the site.

== See also ==
- John the Baptist Monument
