= Iglesia de San Juan Bautista (San Tirso de Abres) =

- Location: Asturias, Spain
- Country: Spain
- Denomination: Roman Catholic

History
- Founded: 16th Century
- Dedication: Saint John

Iglesia de San Juan Bautista (San Tirso de Abres) is a Catholic church located in Asturias, Spain. It was established in the 16th century.

== History ==
The church has been dated back to the 16th century. The church is believed to be associated with the Amaido palace, a 16th‑century manor house of the Santisso and Aguilar families. The church was dedicated to Saint John the Baptist, the town’s patron saint.

For generations it drew pilgrims from the comarca and even Galicia seeking cures for headache ailments.

== Architecture ==
The chapel is a plain rectangular masonry building. According to Asturian heritage records, its architecture is largely Romanesque with some Gothic elements. Notable features include a simple stone bell‐gabled facade and small side windows.

Internally, the former Baroque altarpiece has been dismantled; many of its carved wooden images survive and are locally attributed to the famed sculptor Gregorio Fernández. The church has a single nave (no aisles) divided into two sections: a main chapel and a smaller posterior chamber behind the altar (an early form of an ambulatory). In the apse, the floor contains an ancient Roman milestone (“miliario”) set into the ground, and the rear wall has a niche or hole above it.

== Festivals & traditions ==
Until the mid-20th century, believers practiced a miracle‐cure ritual at the church. They would rub a stone on the Roman milestone and spread the dust on their foreheads inside the wall niche, while reciting prayers, in the hope of curing headaches.

Annually on June 23/24, the Plaza de San Juan, next to the Iglesia de San Juan Bautista, hosts local Saint John the Baptist festivities, including a community sardine feast ('sardinada').

== See also ==
- Asturian art
- Catholic Church in Spain
