= Judith and Holofernes (Preti) =

Painting by Mattia Preti

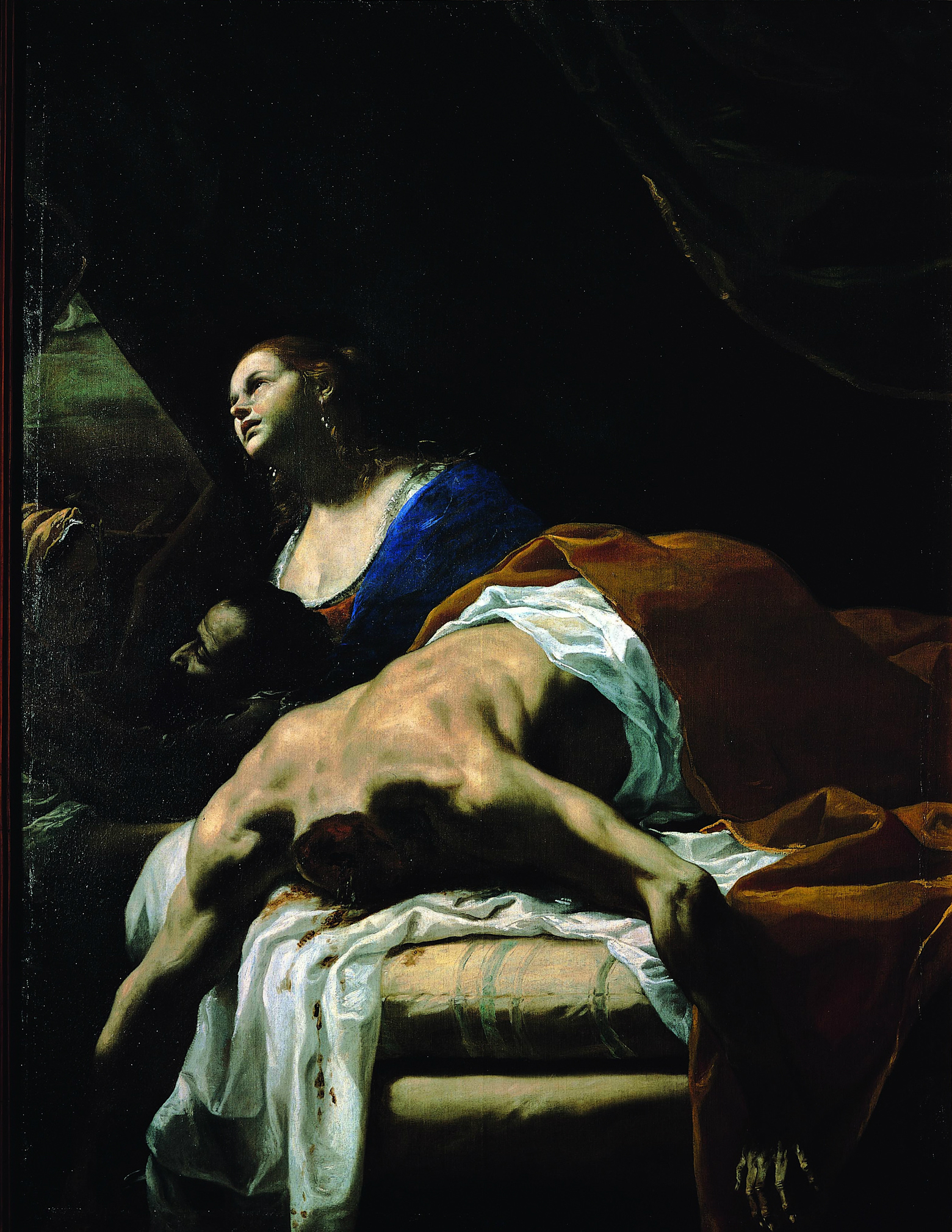
- Artist: Mattia Preti
- Year: c. 1653-1656
- Medium: Oil on canvas
- Dimensions: 186 cm × 143 cm (73 in × 56 in)
- Location: Museo di Capodimonte, Naples

Judith and Holofernes is an oil on canvas painting by Italian artist Mattia Preti, datable to around 1653–1656. It is held at the Museo di Capodimonte, in Naples.

== History ==
The canvas is mentioned for the first time in the last will of the Calabrian lawyer Domenico di Somma, dated of 1659, where another work by Preti, the St John the Baptist is also named.

The legacy of di Somma passed to his collaborator and friend, also from Calabria, Antonino Laratta. Both of them were Preti lawyers during the controversy that the painter had a few years earlier against the priests of the Church of Sant'Andrea della Valle in Rome, for a diatribe relating to fees due for the cycles of frescoes that Preti executed on the life of Saint Andrew.

On the death of Laratta, in 1685, the painting, together with that of St. John the Baptist, passed to the Church of San Domenico Soriano in Naples, a central place for the life of the Calabrian community in the city. The two works, therefore, at the will of the new owner, who in any case complied with a previous request indicated in Somma's will, were placed along the two side walls of the chapel where the lawyer Domenico had been buried, the first on the right of the main altar.

After the suppression of the religious order in 1806, the painting, together with that of St. John the Baptist and another, the first executed by Preti once he arrived in Naples, the St. Nicholas of Bari for the Gallo-Coscia Chapel, were taken and brought into the Bourbon collections of the Palazzo dei Regi Studi. However, unlike the San Nicola, which found a place in the Neapolitan museum from the beginning, the Judith canvas appears in inventory among those permanently exhibited only in 1870, as it was first confined to deposits and then, in 1839, affected by a restoration work on the support.

== Description ==
The painting takes place in the dark interior of a tent, where the Assyrian general Holofernes was sleeping, after being led to believe of the Jews eminent defeat by Judith. The characters seem particularly illuminated in the scene, in contrast with the darkness surrounding them. It depicts Judith after beheading the sleeping general, holding his head on her arms, with an apparently sorrowful look. Judith looks up as if convinced of having fulfilled God's will, while the beheaded and partially naked corpse of Holofernes lies on his bed, with his neck dripping blood. The chiaroscuro of the painting is clearly inspired by Caravaggio.
