= Church of San Juan Bautista (Arganda del Rey) =

Cultural property in Arganda del Rey, Spain

- Iglesia de San Juan Bautista (Spanish)
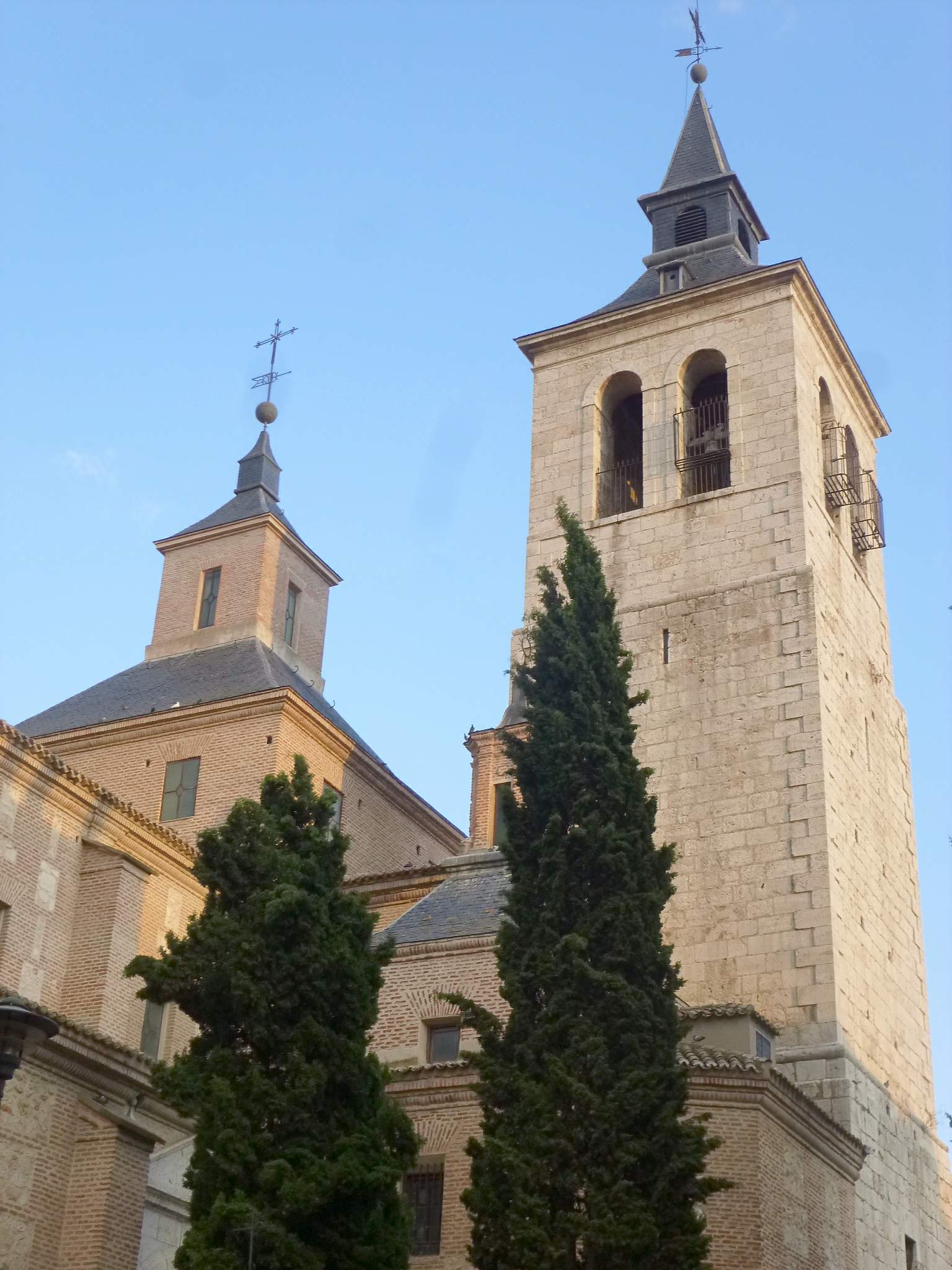

- Location within Spain
- 40.300796°N 3.438922°W
- Location: Arganda del Rey, Spain

Spanish Cultural Heritage
- Official name: Iglesia de San Juan Bautista
- Type: Non-movable
- Criteria: Monument
- Designated: 1999
- Reference no.: RI-51-0010491

The Church of San Juan Bautista (Spanish: Iglesia de San Juan Bautista) is a church located in Arganda del Rey, Spain. It was declared Bien de Interés Cultural in 1999.

The church has a Latin cross plan with three naves. It has a lantern topped with a very harmonious and high-rise spire. The 60-meter-high bell tower erected between 1709 and 1714 is located on the west facade of the building. The tower is topped by a typically Madrid-style slate spire, with a ball, weathercock and cross, built in 1781. The Baroque altarpiece from the first third of the 17th century is remarkable.
