= Iglesia de San Juan Bautista (Maricao, Puerto Rico) =

Historic church in Maricao, Puerto Rico

- Church San Juan Bautista of Maricao
- U.S. National Register of Historic Places
- Puerto Rico Historic Sites and Zones
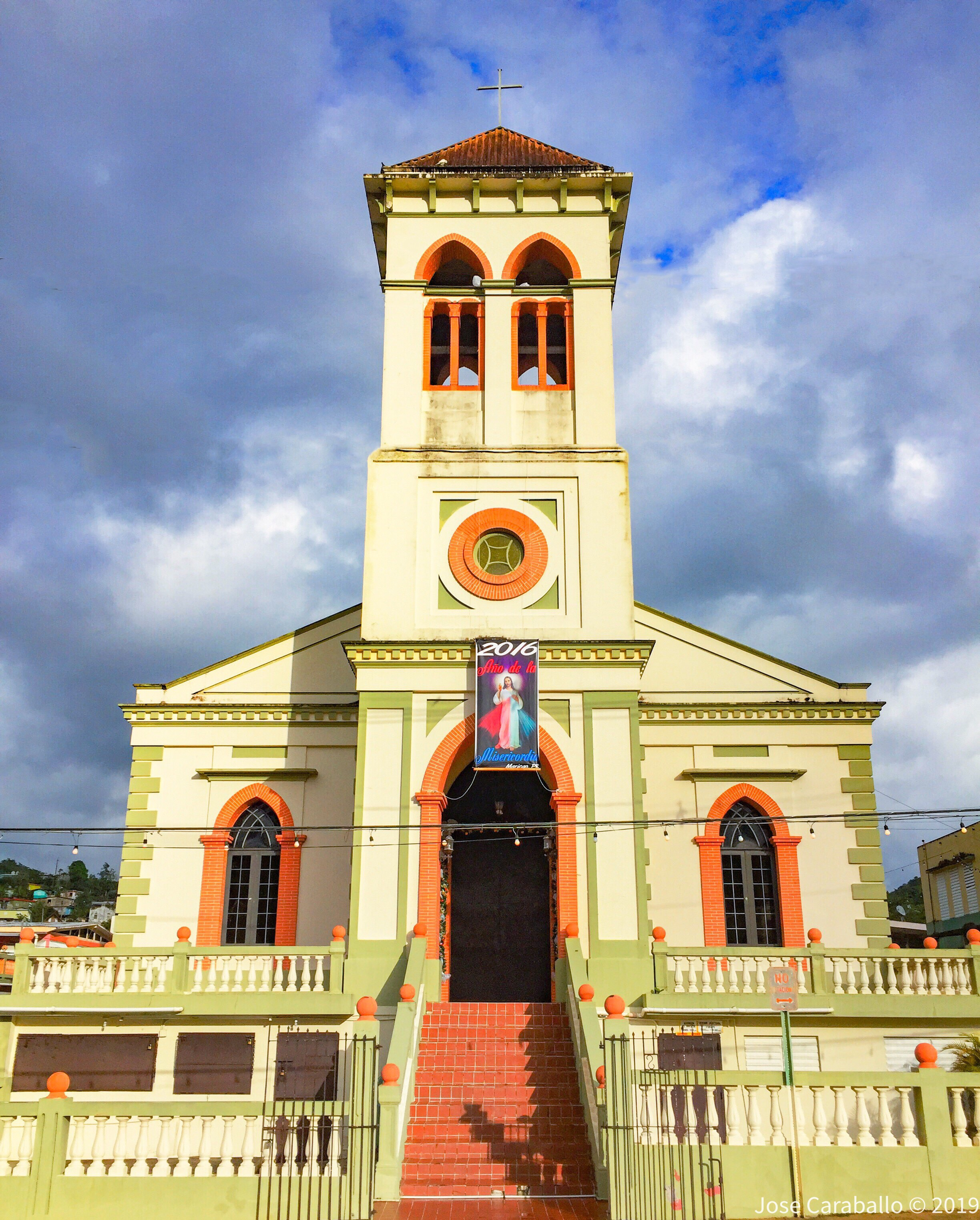
- Iglesia de San Juan Bautista in 2016

- Location within Puerto Rico
- Location: Baldorioty St., Town Plaza, Maricao, Puerto Rico
- Coordinates: 18°10′51″N 66°58′46″W
- Built: 1890–c. 1898
- Engineer: Coranado, Jeronimo Jimenez
- Architectural style: Gothic
- MPS: Historic Churches of Puerto Rico MPS
- NRHP reference No.: 84003125
- RNSZH No.: 2000-(RC)-22-JP-SH

Significant dates
- Added to NRHP: September 18, 1984
- Designated RNSZH: March 15, 2001

The Iglesia de San Juan Bautista (English: Church of Saint John the Baptist) in Maricao, Puerto Rico is a church built during 1890-c.1898. It was listed on the National Register of Historic Places in 1984, and on the Puerto Rico Register of Historic Sites and Zones in 2000.

Its facade, facing onto the plaza of Maricao, is dominated by a three-level square bell tower, whose first level is a portico and which is capped by a pyramidal concrete roof. Its exterior has Gothic-style pointed arches; its interior has more traditional rounded arches. It has a nave and two aisles. The church's original roof was replaced in 1965 by a metal joist structure supporting corrugated asbestos sheets.

It was designed by engineer Jeronimo Jiminez Coranado.

It is one of 31 churches in Puerto Rico reviewed for listing on the National Register in 1984.

== Gallery ==
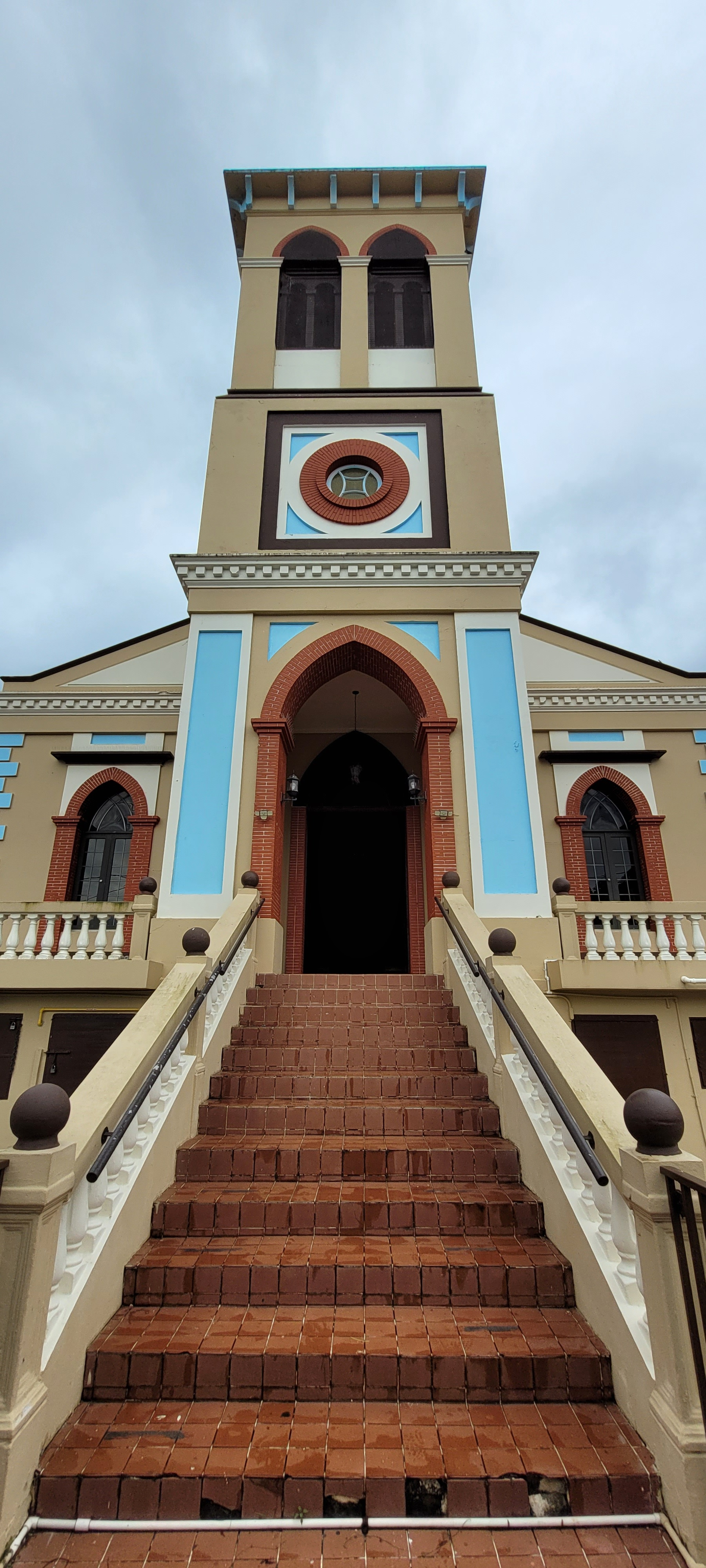

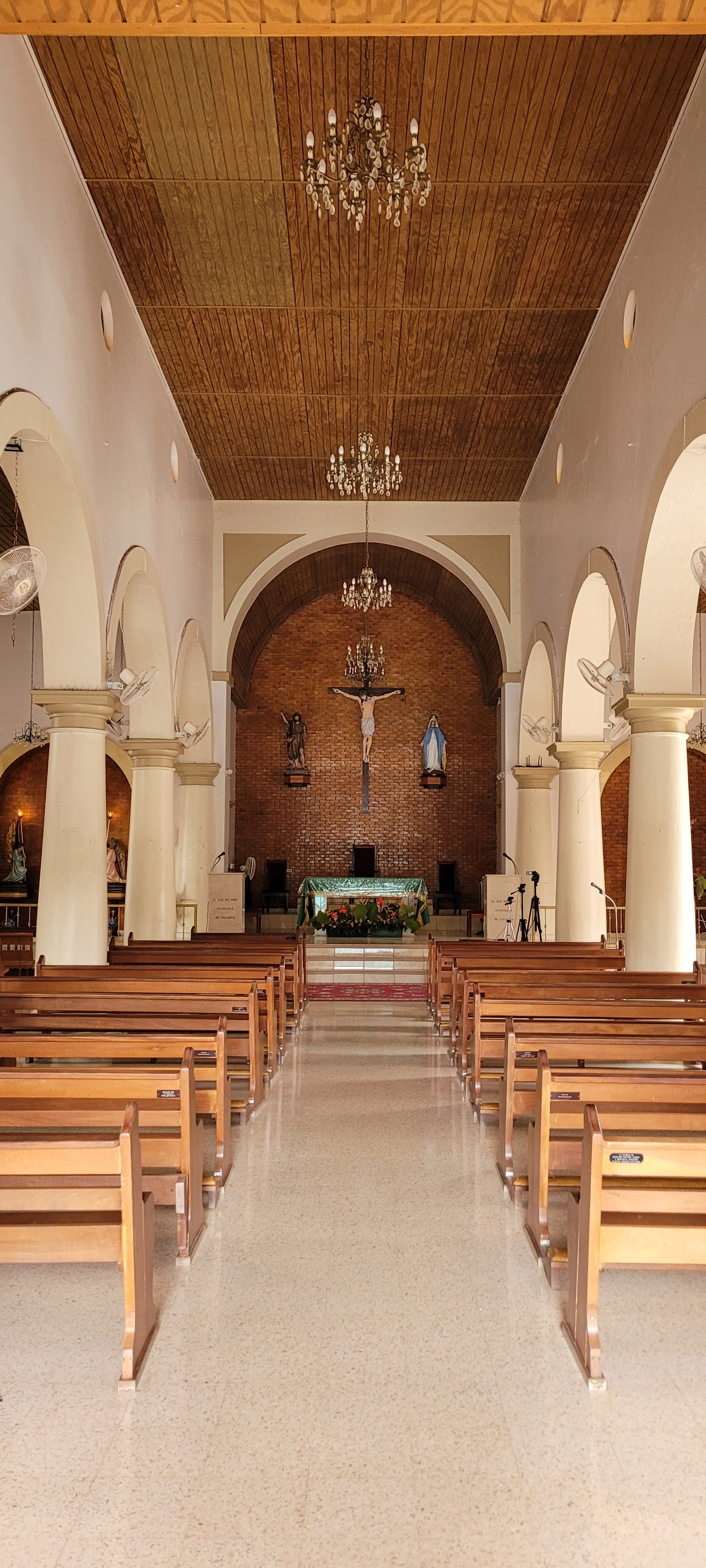

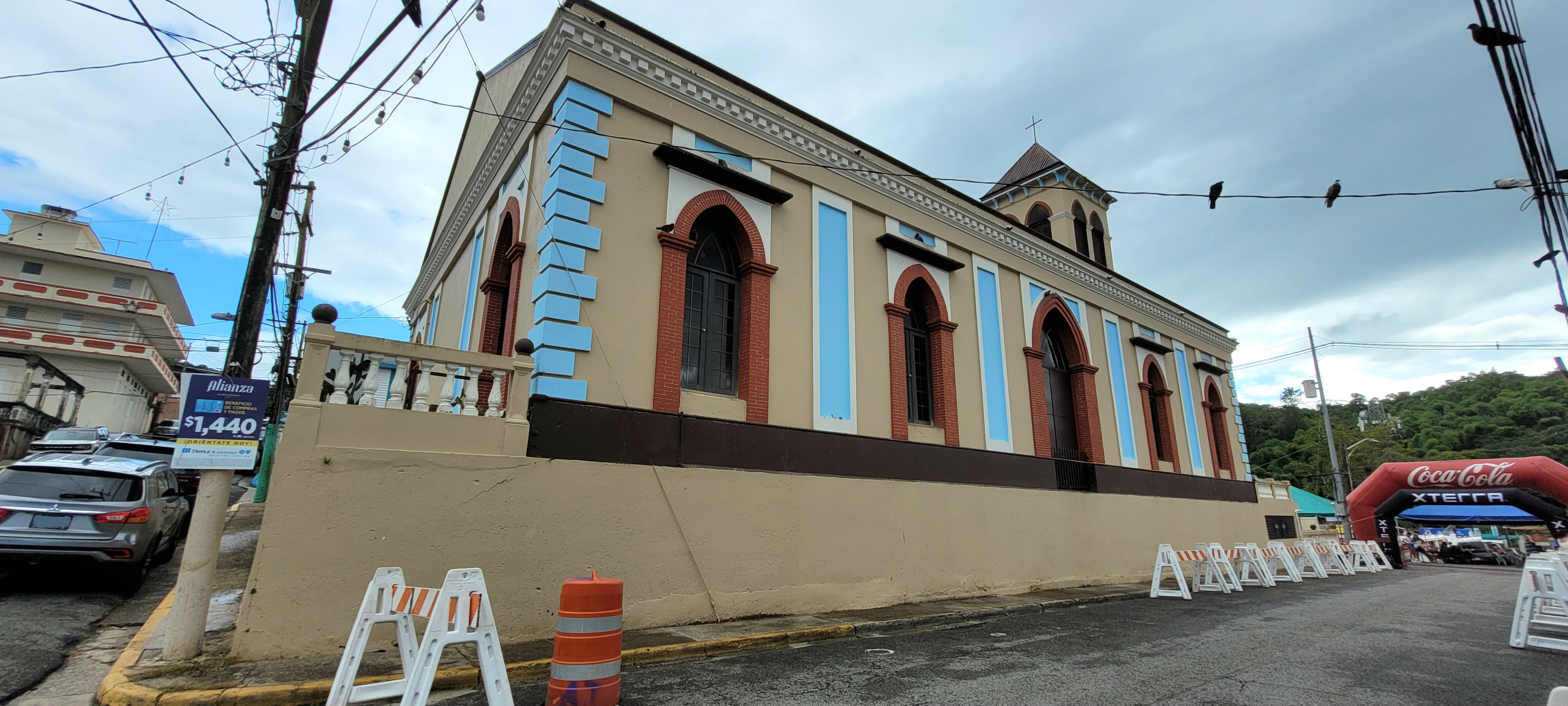
