= Church of San Juan Bautista (Talamanca de Jarama) =

Cultural property in Talamanca de Jarama, Spain

- Iglesia de San Juan Bautista (Spanish)
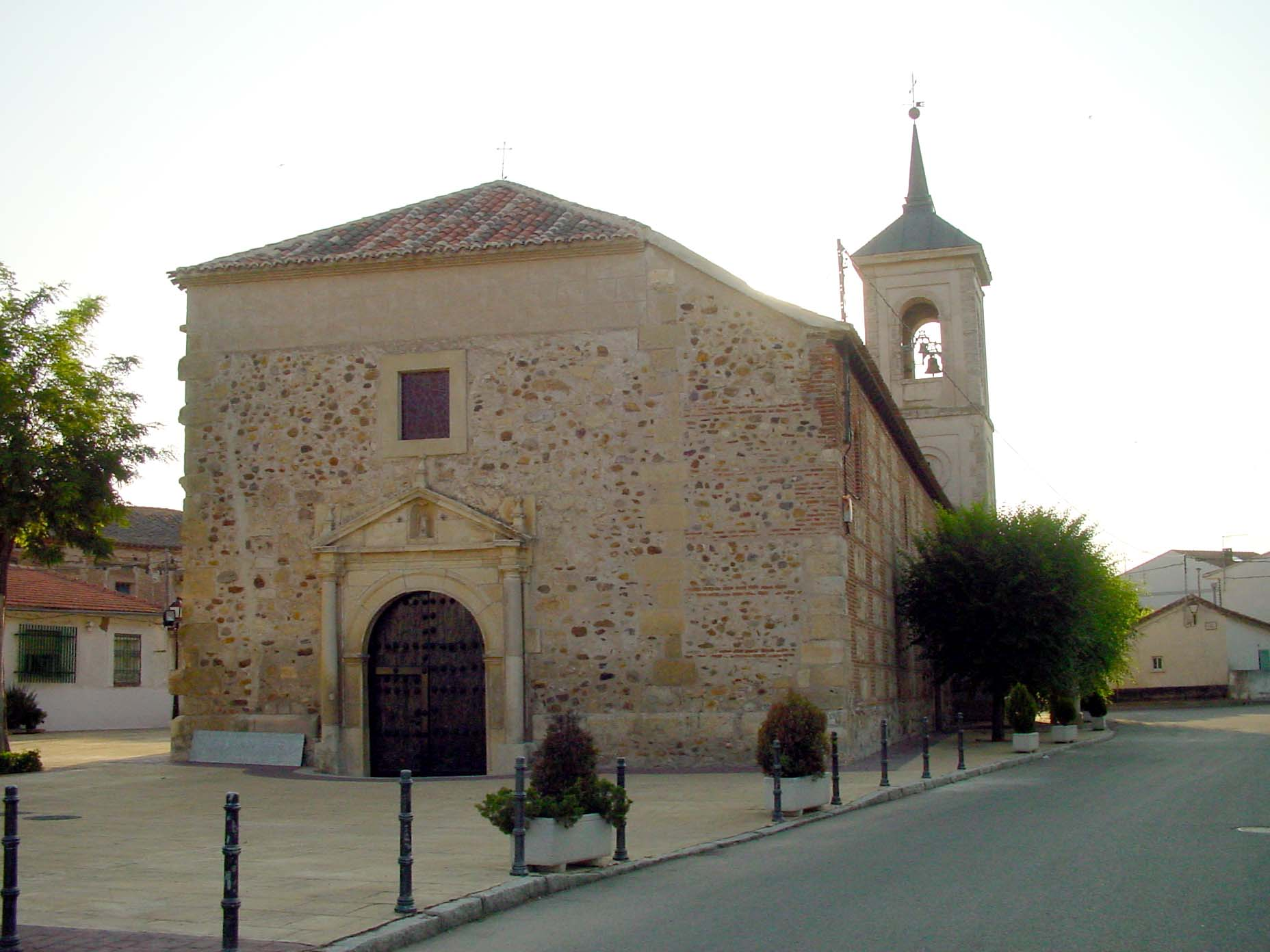

- Location within Spain
- 40.746252°N 3.514912°W
- Location: Talamanca de Jarama, Spain

Spanish Cultural Heritage
- Official name: Iglesia de San Juan Bautista
- Type: Non-movable
- Criteria: Monument
- Designated: 1931
- Reference no.: RI-51-0000724

The Church of San Juan Bautista (Spanish: Iglesia de San Juan Bautista) is a church located in Talamanca de Jarama, Spain. It was declared Bien de Interés Cultural in 1931.

It was built in the late 12th century or the early 13th century, in Romanesque style. However, only the apse has survived from the original edifice, since the rest was demolished in the 16th century and rebuilt according to the Renaissance manner.
