= Church of San Juan Bautista, Baños de Cerrato =

Medieval church in Castile and León, Spain

San Juan Bautista de Baños de Cerrato
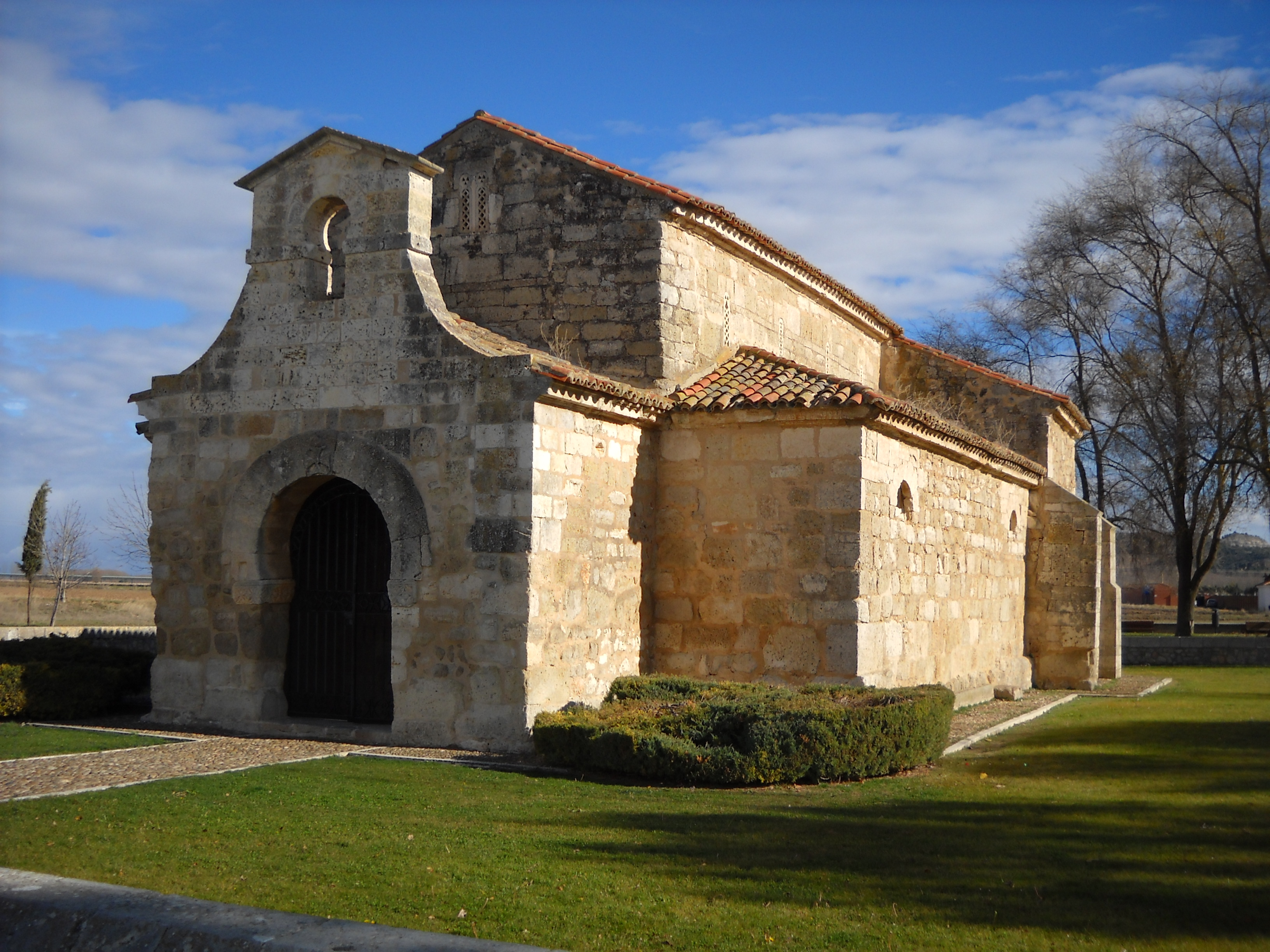

- 41.9208°N 4.47236°W
- Location: Baños de Cerrato, Castile and León, Spain
- Denomination: Roman Catholic
- Tradition: Roman Rite

Architecture
- Architectural type: Church
- Style: Preromanesque
- Completed: 7th century

Specifications
- Materials: Stone

The Church of San Juan Bautista or San Juan Bautista de Baños de Cerrato is a stone Early Medieval Visigothic church dedicated to St John the Baptist in the village of Baños de Cerrato, ancient Balneos, in the province of Palencia, in central Spain.

== History ==
The church is located in the fertile Pisuerga River valley, near the confluence with the Carrión River. In Roman times, the area offered opportunities for vacations and relaxation, with many private villas dotting the landscape. In Roman times as under the Visigoths, this was an important grain-producing region. With the coming of the railways the nearby town of Venta de Baños is now larger and more important than Baños de Cerrato.

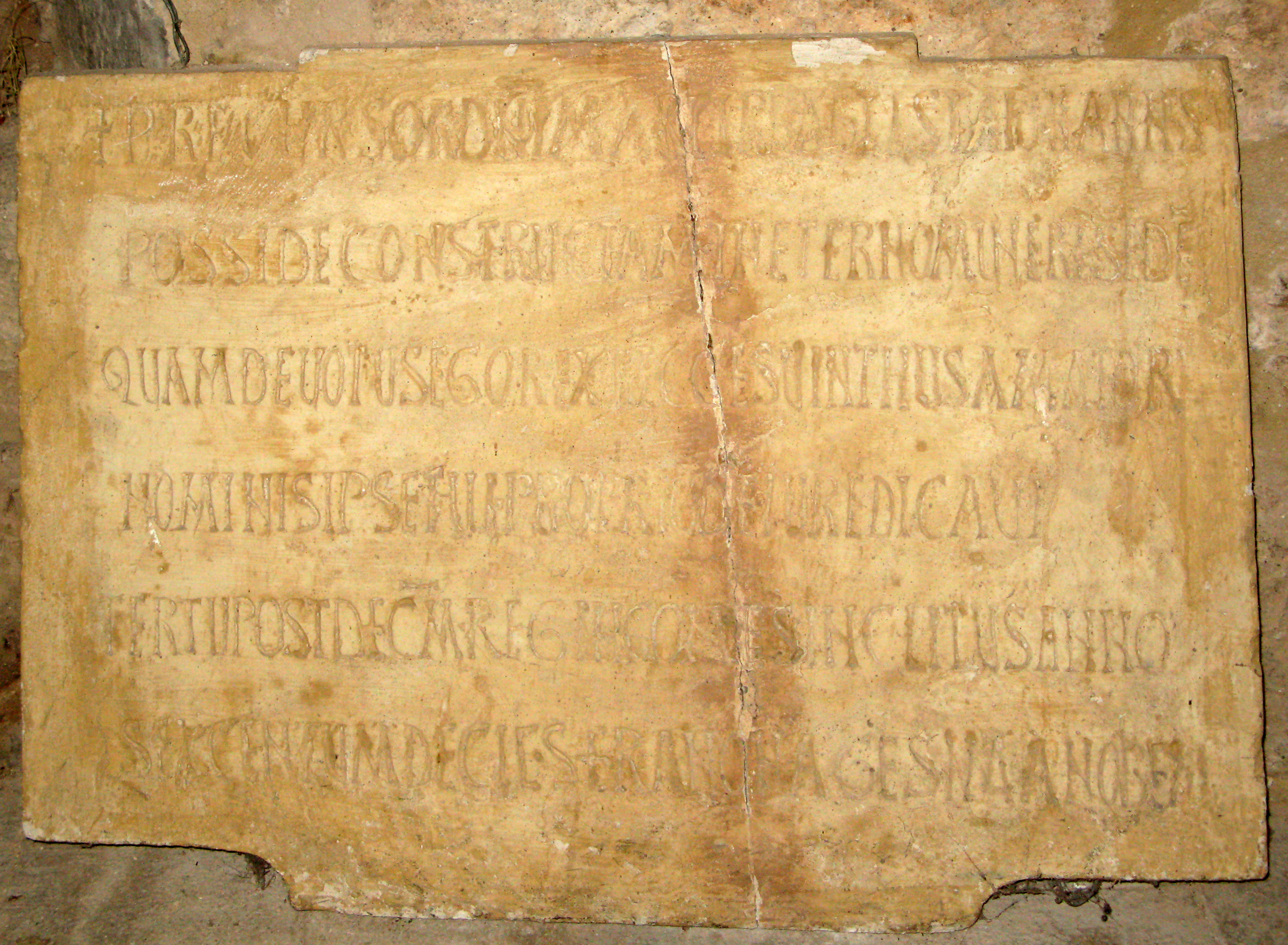
Replica of original consecration inscription

The church was commissioned by the Visigothic king Recceswinth of Hispania (the Iberian Peninsula, comprising modern Spain and Portugal), in the year 661 and whose solemn consecration ceremony is believed to have taken place on 3 January, 661. It has a consecration inscription over its entry, in awkward capital letters. This text is also preserved in a codex of the 10th century, copied from a Toledan manuscript from the 8th century. A literal translation would be:

Forerunner of the Lord, martyr John the Baptist owns this seat, built as an eternal gift which I myself, King Recesvinto, devotee and lover of your name, dedicated to you in his own right, in the third year, after the tenth, as an illustrious companion of the kingdom, in the Era, six hundred and ninety-nine.

The church was built as a royal foundation under the control of the Bishops of Palencia.

Some proponents have suggested that it is not Visigothic, but 9th century or more recent probably 10th century in date. On this basis the pre-Romanesque architecture could be described as Repoblacion or possibly Mozarabic. Some arguments for this revised date include the use of ashlar (unparalleled in buildings archaeologically dated to the Visigothic period), and the evident mismatched use of earlier Visigothic carved stones in the frieze.

== Architecture ==
The church construction is of ashlar (squared stone, as against irregular rubble) set in a drywall manner (with no mortar). It and several other Visigothic churches built in Spain about the same time represent the last ashlar construction in western Europe until Charlemagne, and can be seen as the end of that ancient Roman building tradition in the west. George R.H. Wright notes the Syrian influence seen in the horseshoe-shaped arch in pre-Islamic Spain. The belfry above was added at a later date.

== Related sites ==
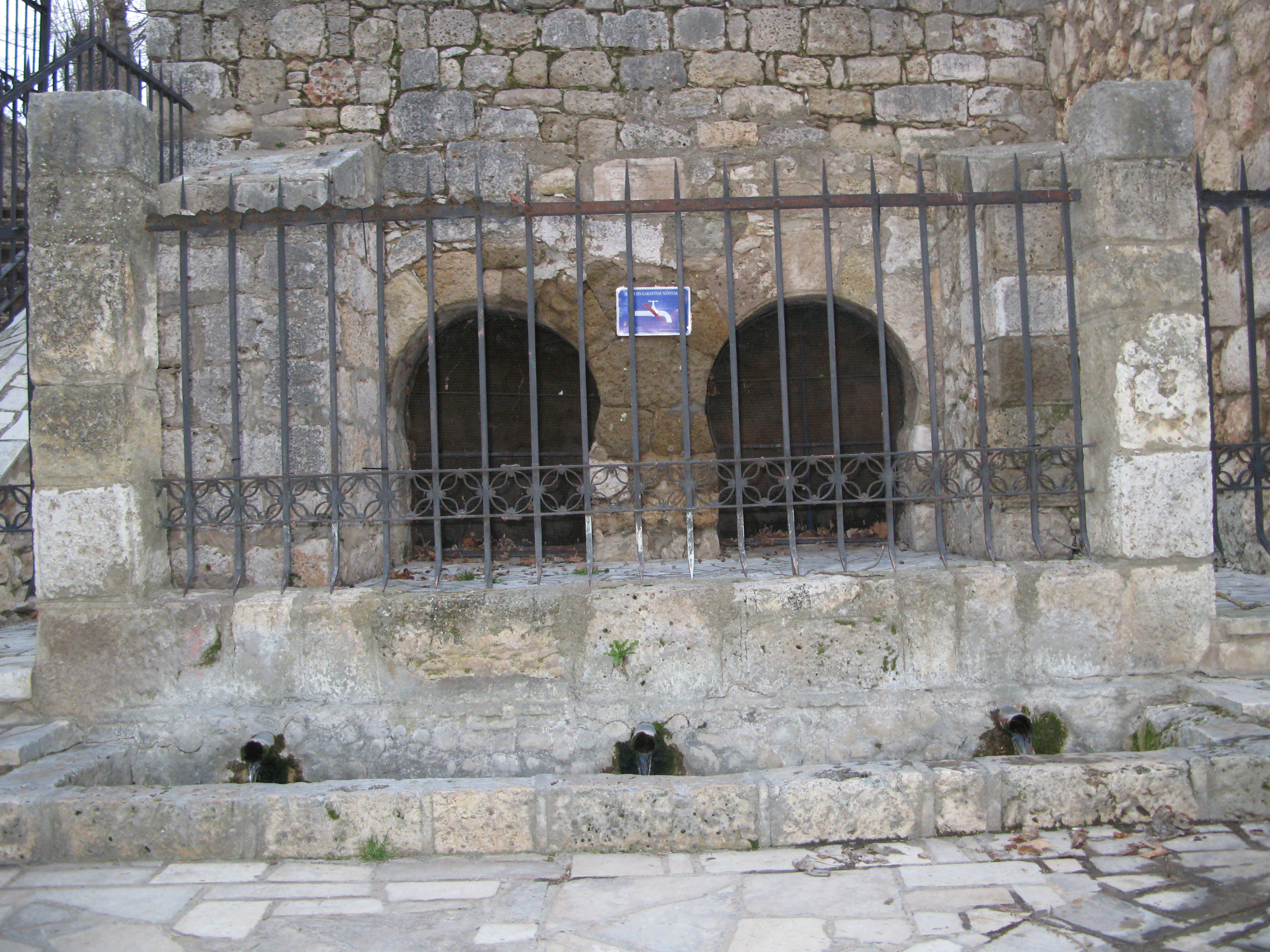

The name of the village references baths, and there is a fountain, the Fuente de San Juan, near the church.

The excavations that were carried out in 1956 and 1963 yielded a medieval necropolis of 58 tombs to the north-west of the church and discovered three pieces of 7th-century bronze: two belt buckles in the shape of a lyre and one liturgical object.

== See also ==
- Visigothic Kingdom
- Ashlar
