= Square du Temple – Elie-Wiesel =

Garden in Paris, France

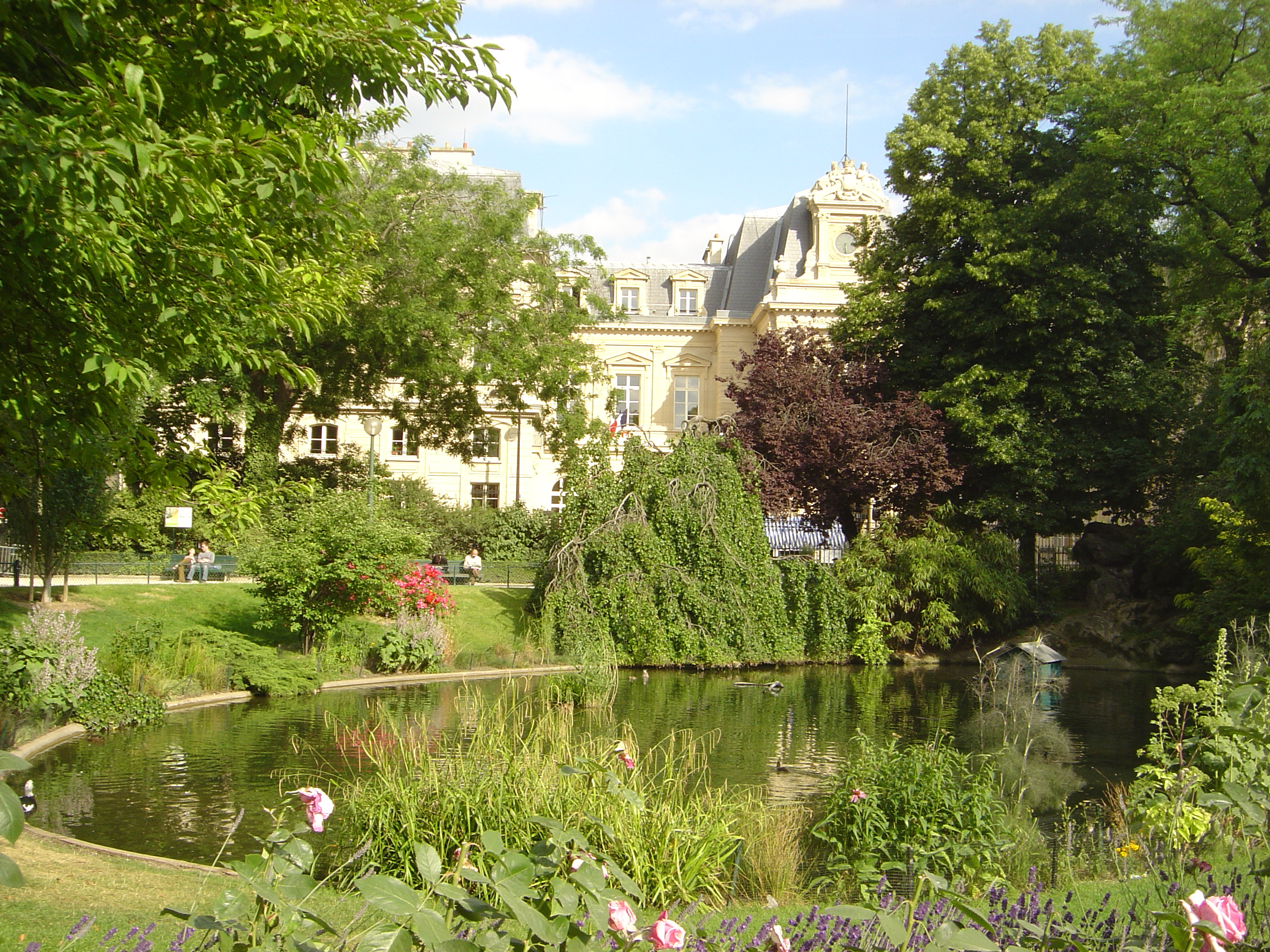
- The square, with the 3rd Arrondissement Town Hall in the background.

- Location within Paris
- Location: 3rd arrondissement, Paris
- Coordinates: 48°51′52″N 2°21′39″E
- Area: 7,700 m^{2}
- Established: 1857

Enclos du Temple
- Paris, France
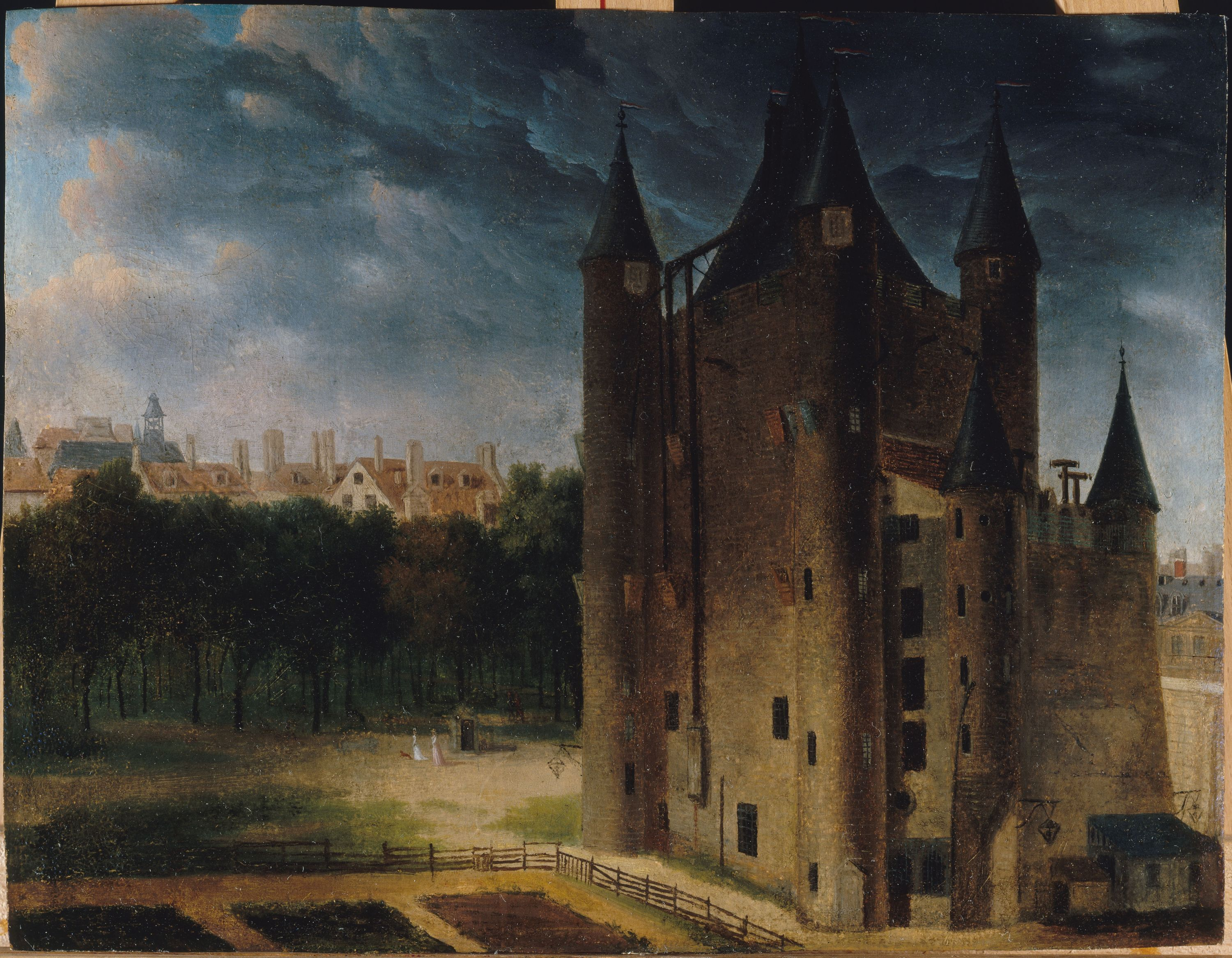
- A view of the Grosse Tour c. 1795, Ecole Française 18th century

Site information
- Type: Medieval fortress
- Condition: Demolished

Location
- Location within Paris

Site history
- Built: mid-13th century
- Built by: Knights Templar
- Demolished: 1808
- Events: French Revolution

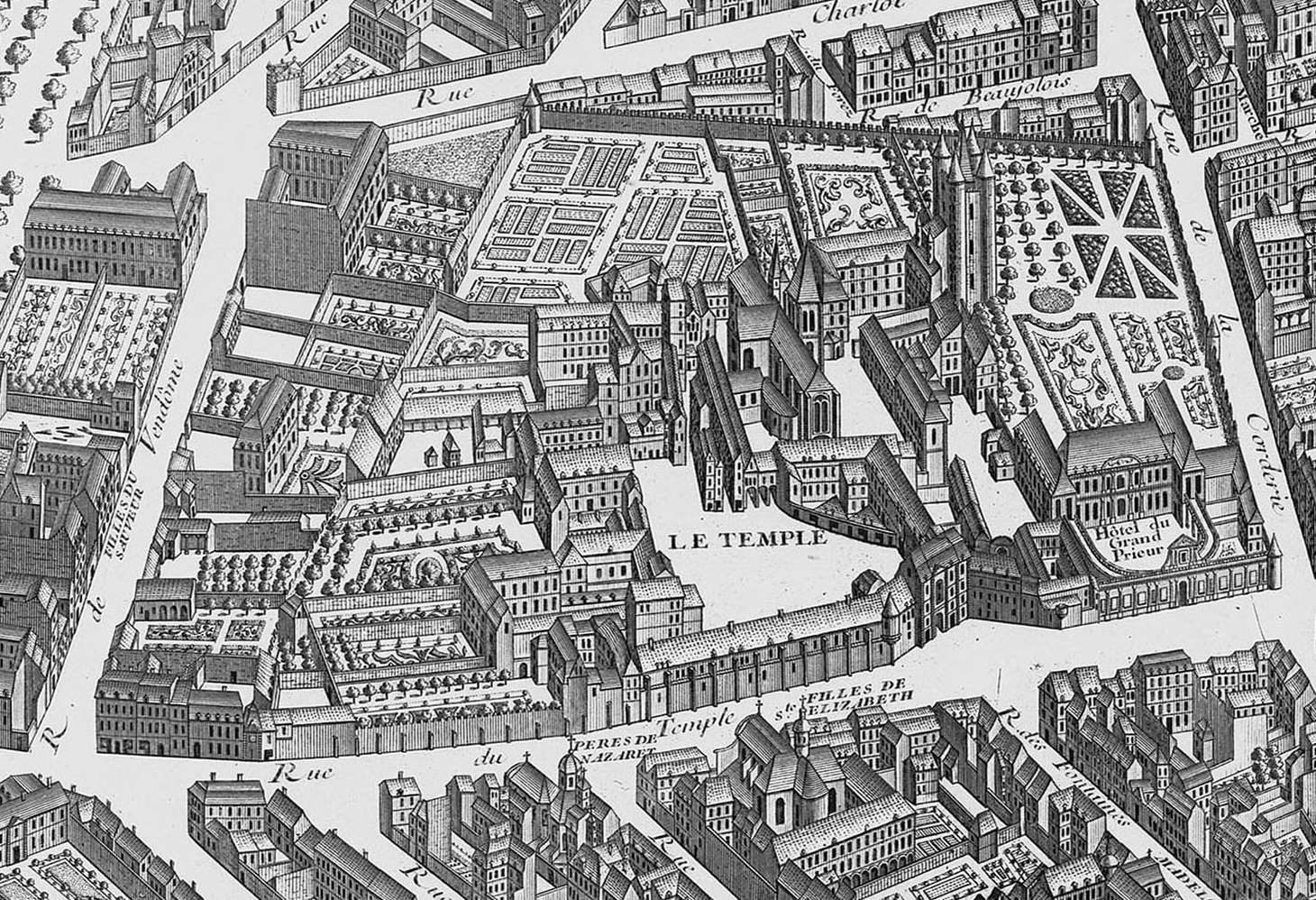
The Temple area in 1734 - detail of the Turgot map of Paris.

The Square du Temple – Elie-Wiesel is a garden square in Paris, France, in the 3rd arrondissement, established in 1857. It is one of 24 city squares planned and created by Georges-Eugène Haussmann and Jean-Charles Adolphe Alphand. The square occupies the site of a medieval fortress in Paris, known as the Enclos du Temple, which was built by the Knights Templar. Parts of the fortress were later used as a prison during the French Revolution and then demolished by the mid-19th century.

== Location and access ==
Marking the northern boundary of the Marais district, the Square du Temple – Elie-Wiesel is bordered by Rue de Bretagne to the south, Rue Eugène-Spuller to the east, Rue Perrée to the north, and Rue du Temple to the west. To the east, it formerly overlooked a public bathhouse, which was subsequently replaced by the 3rd Arrondissement Town Hall, located on the opposite side of Rue Eugène-Spuller.

Like the neighboring Carreau du Temple building, the square occupies a portion of the former Enclos du Temple and partially covers the former site of the Grosse Tour.

Opposite the square, in front of 10 Rue Perrée, stands a Vélib' docking station. Further to the west, at 18 on the same street, a building facing the garden features a sundial embedded within a sculpture that spans five stories. An inscription on the building identifies the sculptor as "J. Rispal."

The square is served by the nearby Temple station on Line 3 of the Paris Metro.

== Features ==
The square features a bandstand dating from 1900, a children's playground, and several lawns—the largest of which is open to the public from April 15 to October 15—as well as fountains and a water feature with an artificial waterfall set amidst rocks from the Forest of Fontainebleau. The wrought-iron fence enclosing the square was designed by the architect Gabriel Davioud.

=== Botany ===
The square is home to 71 trees and 191 plant varieties, including numerous exotic species such as a Turkish hazel (designated a "remarkable tree"), a ginkgo biloba, a Japanese pagoda tree, a honey locust, a Caucasian wingnut, a goldenrain tree, a Chinese quince, and a Spanish cedar. In 2007, the square was awarded the "Ecological Green Spaces" label by ECOCERT.

=== Statuary ===
The square features two statues. One depicts the songwriter Béranger, who lived on the nearby street that was subsequently named after him (Rue Béranger). This is the second statue created in his likeness: an earlier bronze statue—sculpted by Amédée Doublemard and erected following a public subscription launched in 1879 by the newspaper *La Chanson*—was destroyed in 1941. It was replaced in 1953 by the current stone statue, created by Henri Lagriffoul.

Another statue consists of a bust atop a pedestal bearing the inscription: "To B. Wilhelm, Founder (1781–1842) — L'Orphéon Français." Situated beneath this inscription is a medallion portrait accompanied by the text: "To Eugène Delaporte, Promoter (1818–1886)."

== History ==
=== Origins ===
The Enclos du Temple originally hosted the Maison du Temple, the headquarters for the Knights Templar's Province of France and the largest Templar commandery in France.

The precise date of the Templars' establishment there remains unclear; the site replaced the Vieux Temple (Old Temple)—their initial residence, established circa 1140—which was situated opposite the Church of Saint-Jean-en-Grève, on the site of the present-day Rue de Lobau near the Place de Grève. Jacquemin, archivist of the Priory of France, states that the title deeds relating to this foundation were burned by the Templars at the time of their arrest, but without providing proof of this. Historians such as Henri Sauval and Jean-Aymar Piganiol de la Force found nothing regarding its origins; as for Abbé Lebeuf, he states that the House of the Templars was founded during the 12th century, while Cocheris surmises that it was already in existence when Mathieu de Beaumont, in 1152, donated a portion of the lordship of Reuilly and the surrounding lands.

Indeed, a charter dated 1146—issued by Simon, Bishop of Noyon, and discovered at the Commandery of Eterpigny—attests to the presence of a Maison du Temple in Paris, where the Commander and the knights were assembled. Around 1172,^{[a]} Lady Gente granted to the Templars possession of a mill—with a dwelling situated above it—located at the Grand-Pont, within the feudal tenure of the Chapter of Notre-Dame, in exchange for 30 livres paid in a single installment. The deed was executed in the presence of Maurice, Bishop of Paris; Brother Gaudefroy Fouquier, Master of the Temple on this side of the seas; Brother Eustache Le Chien, Master of the Temple in France; and Brother Jean, Commander in Paris. By letters dated 1175, Isambert, Prior of the Church of Saint-Éloi in Paris, granted and confirmed to the Maison du Temple all that it held, subject to the customary rents and usages.

=== Buildings ===
The Enclos du Temple consisted of four major buildings: the Grosse Tour; the Prior’s residence; the Church of Saint-Mary-du-Temple, also known as the Temple Rotunda; and the Temple Cemetery.

=== Early history ===
In 1279, Philip III the Bold concluded an agreement—by means of letters patent—with the Knights Templar regarding the seigneurial justice that the Order exercised over its landed estates. The King acknowledged that the Order held the rights of high, middle, and low justice over all its properties—initially outside the walls of Paris, and subsequently, little by little, within the city limits.^{[b]} By the 14th century, the number of quit-rents or ground rents belonging to the Order was so vast that one would have to list nearly every street and square in Paris to enumerate them all.

In 1312, the Order of the Temple was dissolved, and its assets in France were transferred to the Hospitallers of the Order of Saint John of Jerusalem, thereby establishing the Priory of the Temple. Nevertheless—even though Philip the Fair had ordered the transfer of these assets to the Hospitallers as early as March 28, 1313—the Enclos du Temple was initially withheld, as his son, Louis X, refused to surrender it, designating it instead as the dower for Clementia of Hungary. During the 14th century, the Hospitallers relocated the seat of the Grand Priory of France due to the extensive renovation work required at the site, at a time when their own finances were rather depleted. These renovations were not finally completed until the 15th century, under the tenure of Emery d’Amboise.

=== Early modern history ===
Under Louis XIV, the Châtelet was fiercely jealous of the rights and privileges of the Order of Saint John of Jerusalem and sought every means to curtail them. When, in 1676, the King issued a decree establishing a new Châtelet jurisdiction that would encompass the entirety of Paris, the Hospitallers hastened to Court to lodge a complaint with the King. Louis XIV received them and gave them a hearing. He consented to preserve for them the right of high justice over the Enclosures of the Temple and of Saint-Jean de Latran, along with the right to collect the feudal dues and rents they customarily levied. On this occasion, the King also exempted them from the payment of certain contributions. On March 20, 1678, the Hospitallers sought to present the King's letters—dated January 28—for official ratification; however, the officers of the Châtelet opposed the move. The King, disregarding the officers’ recalcitrance, formally registered the letters by means of a decree issued on September 7.

During the 16th century, Crown officials—much like those of the Châtelet—created difficulties for the Hospitallers in the exercise of their rights and privileges. On one occasion, a royal treasury receiver seized their fief due to the absence of declarations regarding their temporal holdings; on another, a notary brought legal action against the Hospital’s registrar for having executed legal instruments reserved exclusively to the notary's own jurisdiction; and yet again, officers of the Châtelet went so far as to carry out judicial writs within the very precincts of the Enclosure. Under Louis XV and Louis XVI, the Hospitallers enjoyed the ear of the Court. During this era, the Prior (who by then bore the title of Grand Prior) was frequently a Prince of the Blood; this, however, had not been the case during the preceding reigns.

=== French Revolution ===
The Temple is also known for having been the place where the French royal family was jailed on 13 August 1792 during the French Revolution. Members of the royal family imprisoned at the Temple's tower include:

- Louis XVI, King of France, until 21 January 1793, when he was taken to be executed by guillotine at the Place de la Révolution;
- Marie Antoinette, Queen of France, until 1 August 1793, when she was brought to the Conciergerie, from where she was eventually taken to be executed by guillotine;
- Princess Élisabeth, until 9 May 1794, when she was taken to the Conciergerie, from where she was taken to be executed by guillotine the following day;
- Louis XVII, Dauphin of France, until he died of tuberculosis on 8 June 1795, at the age of ten;
- Princess Marie-Thérèse, until 18 December 1795, the eve of her seventeenth birthday, when she was sent into exile.

=== Demolition of the Enclos du Temple ===
In 1808, Napoleon had the Grosse Tour demolished to prevent it from becoming a site of pilgrimage for Royalists. The demolition took two years and was completed in 1811. Today, almost nothing remains of this enclosure and its buildings.

The church—which housed numerous tombs—and the conventual buildings, including a cloister, were destroyed in 1796; the Grand Prior's residence was demolished in 1853.

The palace was the only part of the Enclos du Temple to survive the Revolution and Napoleon’s demolition. Converted first into a gendarmerie barracks, and then, in 1812, into the Ministry of Worship, it was assigned in February 1815—during the First Restoration—to the Benedictine nuns of the Perpetual Adoration of the Blessed Sacrament, a congregation founded by Princess Louise Adélaïde de Bourbon, the sister of the Duke of Bourbon and the last of the Condés.

Forced into exile during the Hundred Days, the Princess established her convent in 1816 within the former mansion of the Grand Priory; adjacent to it, she commissioned the construction of a chapel where she would be laid to rest following her death on March 10, 1824. Following the Revolution of 1848, the nuns were expelled from the palace, which was subsequently demolished in 1853. The portal of its carriage entrance stood on the site now occupied by the entrance to the current Square du Temple - Elie-Wiesel.

=== Square du Temple - Elie-Wiesel ===
Designed by Adolphe Alphand during Haussmann's renovations, the square opened to the public on Wednesday, November 11, 1857. Its total area is 7,700 m^{2}.

It is one of 24 squares created in Paris during Haussmann's renovations by Adolphe Alphand, Director of Public Thoroughfares and Promenades for the City of Paris.

== Notable buildings and sites of memory ==
On October 26, 2007, a stele was inaugurated on the main lawn of the Square du Temple. It bears the first names, surnames, and ages of 85 "little ones who did not have the time to attend school"—Jewish children aged 2 months to 6 years old who lived in the 3rd arrondissement and were deported between 1942 and 1944, then murdered at Auschwitz.

This stele was unveiled in the presence of several hundred people, including elected officials from the arrondissement and the city,^{[c]} as well as representatives of various associations—most notably the Sons and Daughters of Jewish Deportees from France. This ceremony marked the culmination of a project undertaken since 2000 by the association Histoire et mémoire du III^{e} (History and Memory of the 3rd arrondissement), which compiled a census of the names of deported children for every school in the arrondissement—559 children out of the 11,400 Jewish children deported from France—and for whom commemorative plaques have since been affixed to every school building.

These lists were compiled through a meticulous review of school and high school registers, civil registry records held by the town hall, and Serge Klarsfeld’s Memorial to the Deportation of Jews from France.

In 2016, the Mayor of the 3rd arrondissement, Pierre Aidenbaum, proposed renaming the park "Square Elie-Wiesel" in order to pay tribute to Eliezer Wiesel—known as Elie Wiesel—a contemporary American Nobel laureate and Holocaust survivor (1928–2016). A controversy ensued, but on June 29, 2017, the park was officially inaugurated under the name "Square du Temple – Elie-Wiesel."

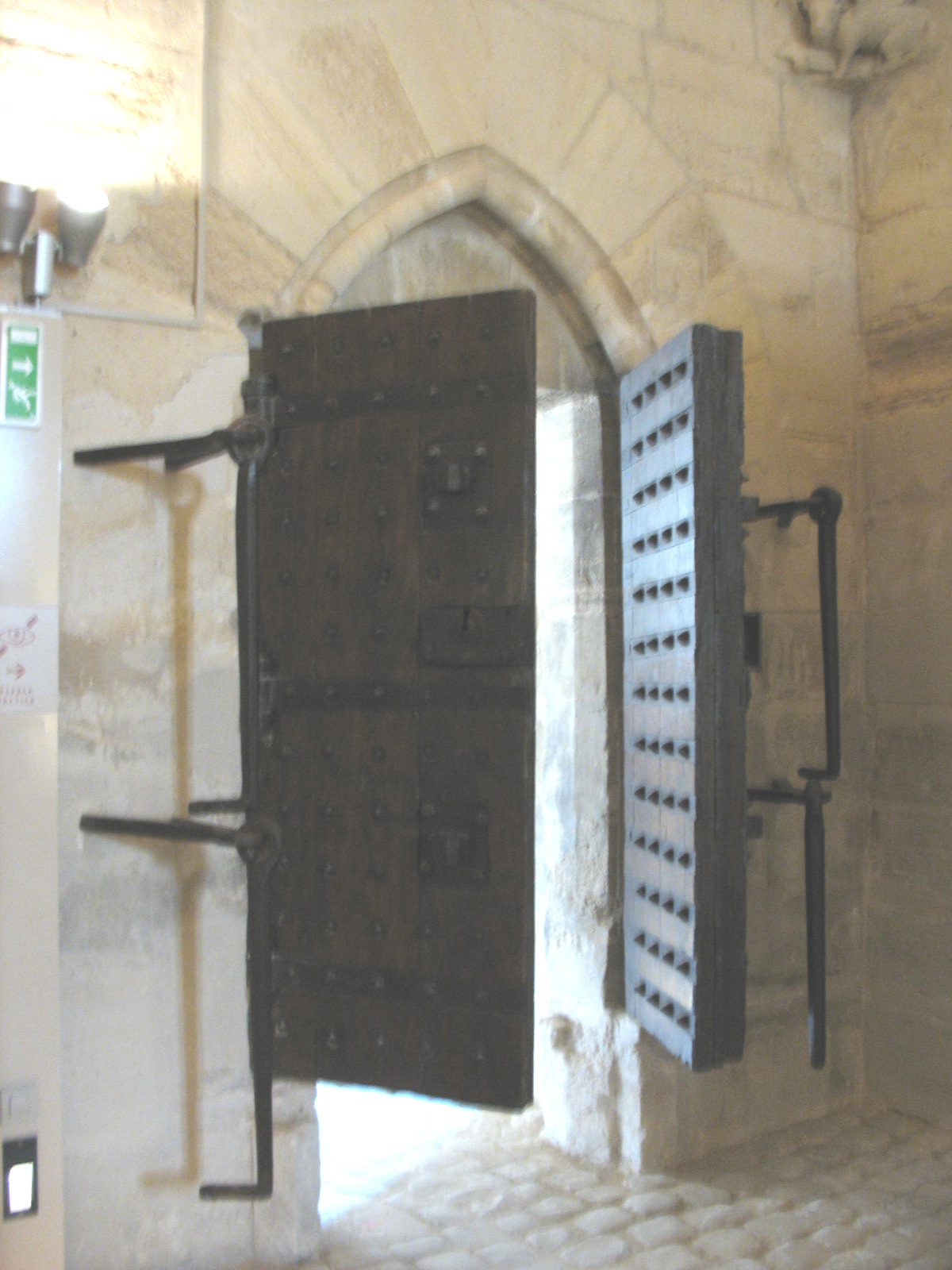
Surviving doors from the Grosse Tour, now found in the Château de Vincennes

== In literature ==
- In Patrick O'Brian's Aubrey-Maturin series, Capt. Jack Aubrey, Dr. Stephen Maturin and a young Lithuanian officer, Jagiello, are held prisoner at the Temple Prison in The Surgeon's Mate.
- In Maurice Druon's Accursed Kings series, the Temple is the residence of Clementia of Hungary and Jacques de Molay is imprisoned at Temple Prison.
The Temple in art

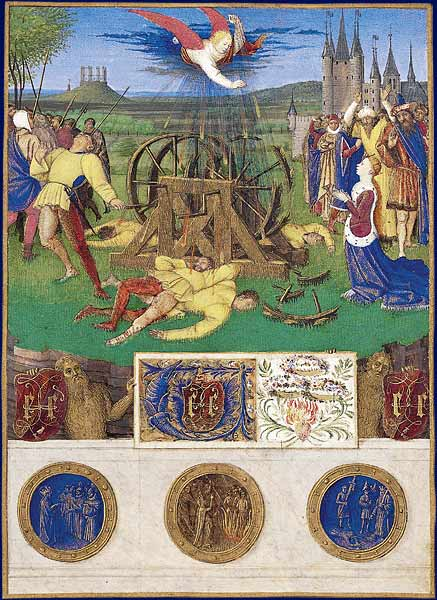
Miniature from the Hours of Étienne Chevalier, with the Temple in the background

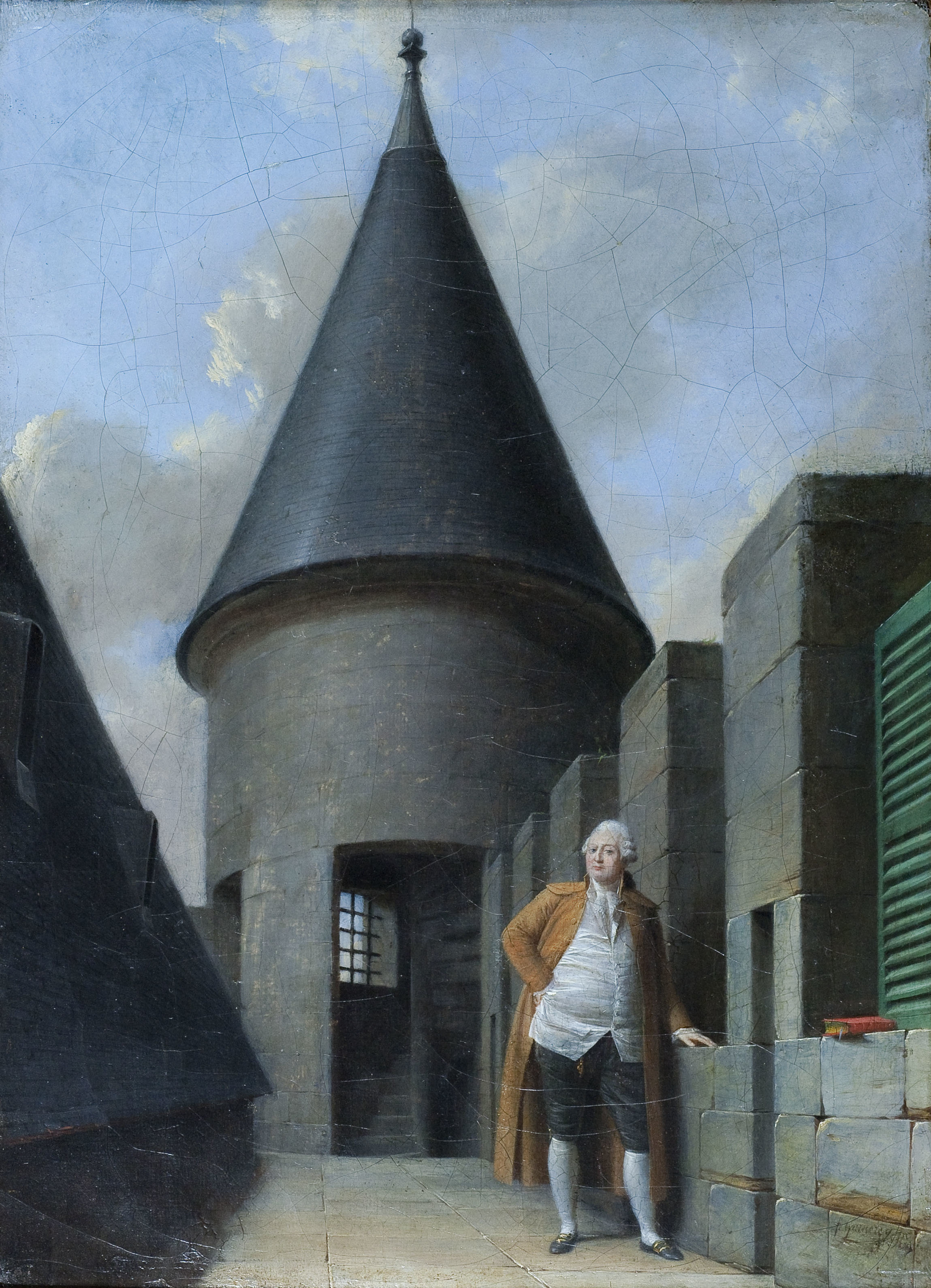
Louis XVI at the Grosse-Tour, by Jean-François Garneray (1755-1837).

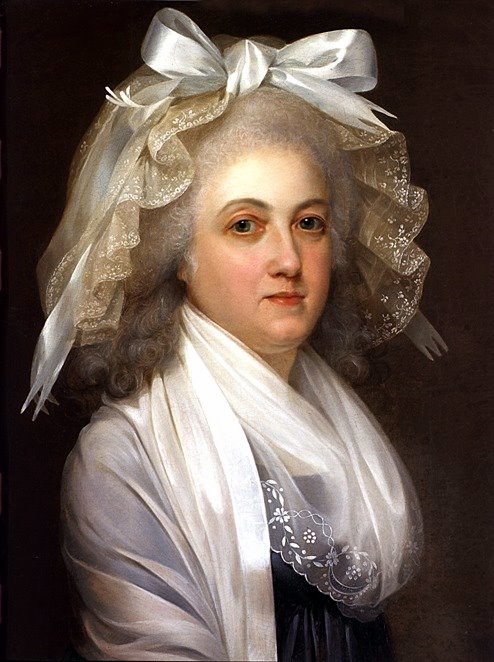
Marie Antoinette in the Grosse-Tour, attributed to Kucharsky

== In popular culture ==
The Temple makes an appearance in the video game Assassin's Creed Unity as the setting for both the prologue of the game during the arrest of Jacques de Molay in 1307, as well as the epilogue of the game, in 1794, where the Assassin Arno Dorian and his lover Élise de la Serre face off against François-Thomas Germain, where after the latter's Sword of Eden explodes, Élise is killed and Germain mortally wounded before being killed off by Arno in vengeance. Fourteen years later upon its demolition in 1808, Germain's fully-decomposed corpse is then discovered from the same place by Arno and Napoleon Bonaparte, and stored in the Paris Catacombs.

== Notes ==
a. The deed bears no date
b. As indicated by a rent roll from the year 1362 (Archives Nationales (France) S 5586), the houses situated on Templar lands numbered 170: 53 on Rue du Temple, 10 on Rue des Poullies, 10 on Rue des Pastourelles, 4 on Rue du Noyer, 12 on Rue Jean Lhuillier, 10 on Rue des Bouchers, 10 on Rue du Chaume, 21 on Rue du Chantier, 11 on Rue des Quatre-Fils-Aymond, 22 on Rue Barbette, and 7 on Rue de Paradis. Included in this total were two smithies, two butcher stalls, and two washhouses. The entire complex was required to pay an annual quit-rent of 265 livres, 5 sols, and 10 deniers.
c. Including Pierre Aidenbaum, Mayor of the 3rd arrondissement; Martine Billard, Member of Parliament for the constituency; Anne Hidalgo, First Deputy Mayor of Paris; Odette Christienne, Deputy Mayor of Paris Responsible For Remembrance And Veterans' Affairs; and several arrondissement councillors.
