= Hélène van Blarenberghe =

Hélène van Blarenberghe , also known as Diane-Hélène-Élisabeth van Blarenberghe or Hélène Torchon (1786–1853), was a French portraitist, miniaturist, lithographer, and landscape painter, and the last professional artist of the Van Blarenberghe dynasty of painters.

== The Van Blarenberghe dynasty ==
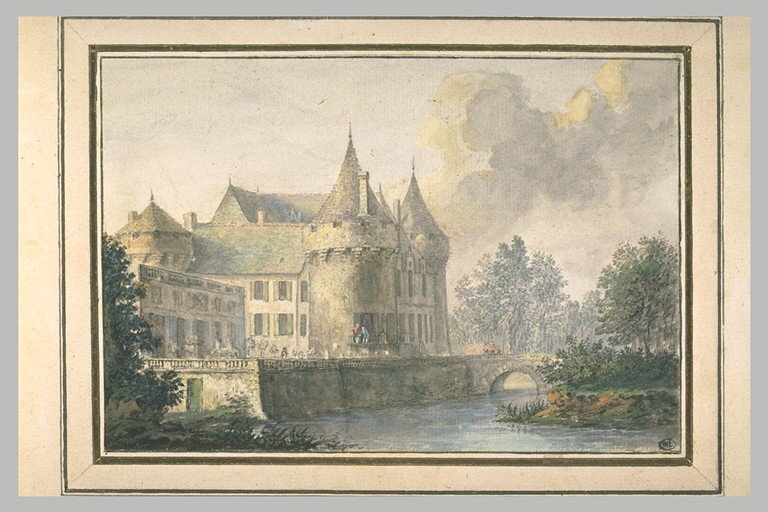
The Château and Moat at Jarnac, near Angoulême, possibly painted by Hélène van Blarenberghe

Hélène van Blarenberghe belonged to the Van Blarenberghe family, a dynasty of painters active in Flanders, Lille, and Paris from the late seventeenth to the early nineteenth century. Originating in Leiden in the Netherlands, the family settled in Flanders at the end of the sixteenth century and later became firmly established in Lille, where several of its members worked as artists.

Hendrik van Blarenberghe (1646–1712) was the first painter in the family, establishing the Van Blarenberghe workshop in Lille. He passed his craft to his son Jacques-Guillaume, a specialist in military subjects, who in turn trained his own son, Louis-Nicolas (1716–1794), the most celebrated member of the family. Louis-Nicolas was appointed painter of battles to the French Ministry of War in 1769 and later to the Ministry of the Navy. His works were preserved in major royal and state collections, including Versailles, the Louvre, and the Hermitage.

Louis-Nicolas's son, Henri-Joseph van Blarenberghe (1741–1825) continued the family tradition as a painter and miniaturist. In 1774 he was appointed drawing master to the royal children, a position he held until the fall of the monarchy in 1792. Hélène van Blarenberghe, who was Henri-Joseph's daughter, was the last professional artist of the Van Blarenberghe family line.

== Early life and training ==
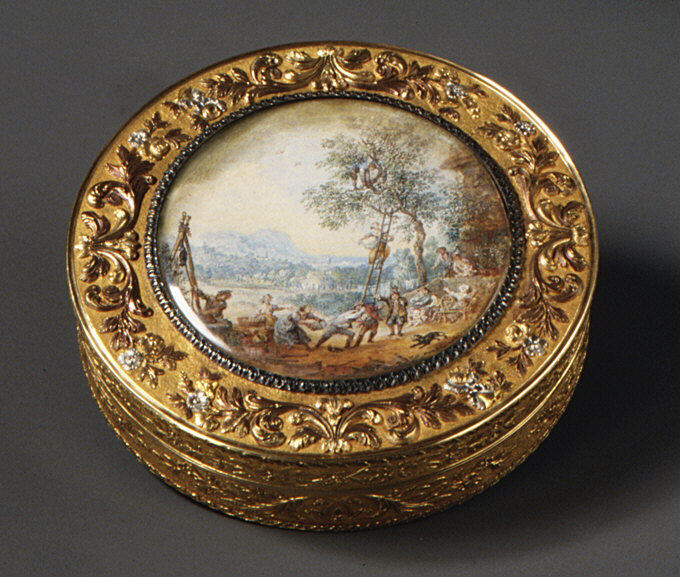
A Van Blarenberghe snuffbox

Diane-Hélène-Élisabeth van Blarenberghe was born on 20 February 1786 in Versailles into a preeminent family serving the French court. She was the daughter of Henri-Joseph van Blarenberghe, the drawing master to the royal children, and Charlotte-Rosalie Damesme, a reader to Élisabeth of France, sister of Louis XVI. She was referred to as Hélène by her family, and was given the names Élisabeth in honour of Élisabeth of France, her godmother, and Diane after Diane de Polignac, first lady of honour to Élisabeth, who represented her at the baptism. Her godfather was the Comte de Provence, the future Louis XVIII, represented by the comte de La Châtre, first gentleman of the chamber.

Hélène's childhood coincided with the tumult of the French Revolution. In August 1792, during the insurrection at the Tuileries, her mother Charlotte-Rosalie Damesme was forced to flee, leaving behind her jewels with a local woman for safekeeping. Her father, Henri-Joseph van Blarenberghe, maintained his role as maître de dessin des enfants de France until the fall of the monarchy, and attempted afterward to continue his teaching by sending models to the daughter of Louis XVI, Marie-Thérèse-Charlotte, in the Temple.

The family adapted by relocating to Lille, where Hélène's father was appointed Conservator of the city's museum, overseeing the restoration and preservation of artworks displaced or damaged during the Revolution, including paintings by Rubens, Van Dyck, Arnould de Vuez, and Jacob Van Oost. From an early age, Hélène trained in her father's workshop and developed both as his pupil and collaborator. Her work closely mirrored his, and in miniatures and gouaches attribution is often difficult.

== Marriage, family and death ==
On 29 November 1812, Hélène van Blarenberghe married Alexandre Torchon, a mobile tax inspector, who was later authorised by Louis XVIII to assume the Van Blarenberghe name. The couple had two children, Alexandrine Charlotte Pauline Hélène and Henri-François-Alexandre van Blarenberghe. With Hélène, however, the Van Blarenberghe line of professional artists came to an end. Although her son later recalled that his grandfather attempted to teach him to draw, he showed no inclination for art, and the family tradition shifted toward technical and engineering professions.

In her later years, Van Blarenberghe lived in Paris at 24 rue de Rivoli. She likely acted as an informal authority on the attribution of works by the Van Blarenberghe family, continuing to engage with the family's artistic legacy. She died at her home on 4 November 1853.

== Work ==
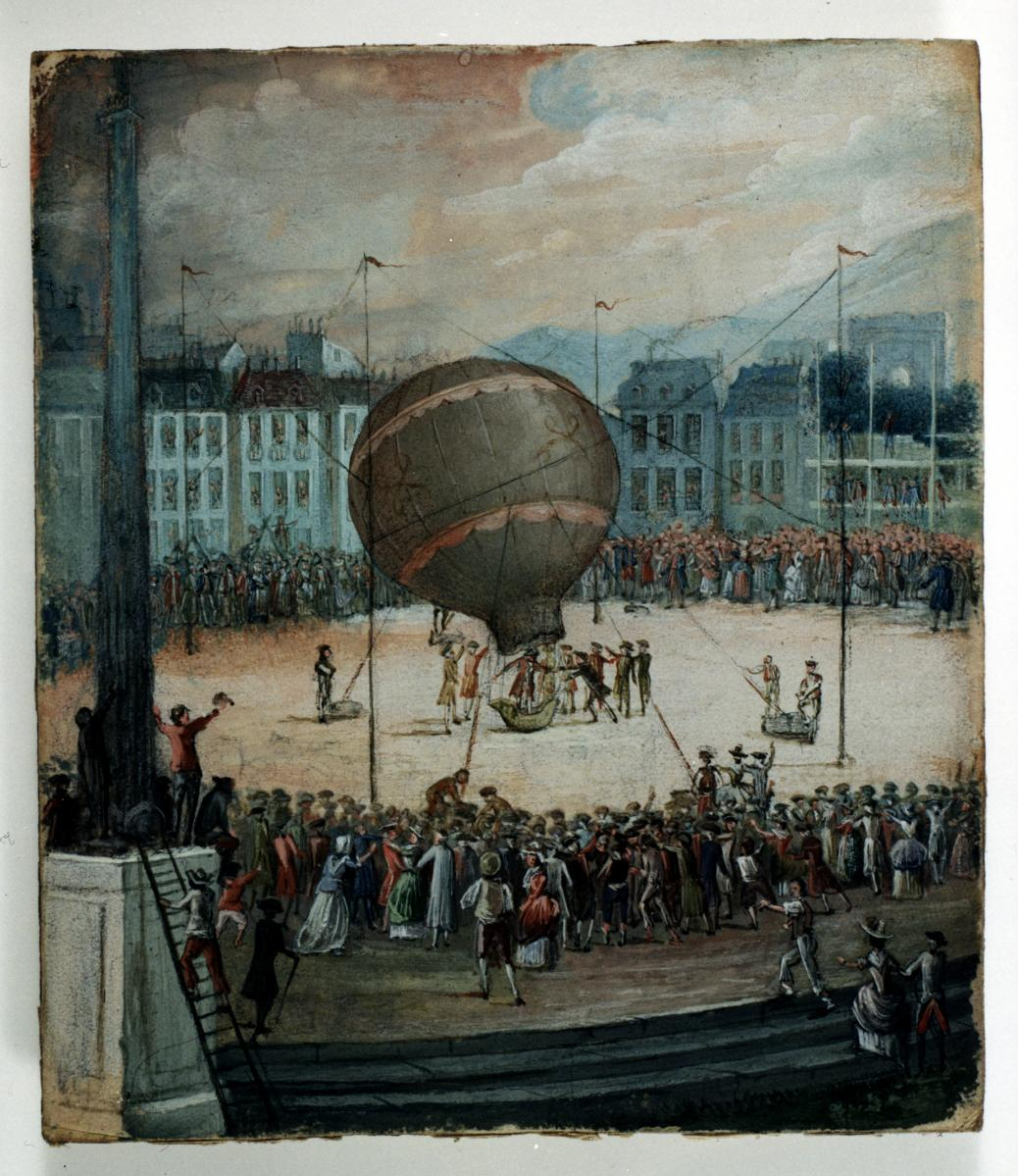
Painting once attributed to Hélène van Blarenberghe

Like her father and grandfather, Hélène worked primarily in miniature painting and gouache, media that the Van Blarenberghe family had mastered for use on luxury objects such as fans, snuffboxes, bonbonnières, and personal ornaments, as well as for independent works on paper or parchment. She also practiced landscape painting, both from life and in composed views, and adopted lithography, a medium that was gaining importance in the nineteenth century.

Among the works securely associated with her are intimate family portraits. Around 1810–1815 she painted a portrait of her father, Henri-Joseph, showing him in a blue frock coat, seated three-quarter length. She also made a lithographic reproduction of this image. Hélène also produced an oval portrait of her mother, Charlotte-Rosalie Damesme, depicted in a green velvet dress and red shawl. A 1914 history of the Van Blarenberghe dynasty of painters notes that among Hélène's works were a self-portrait, a landscape with figures, and a work named Vénus sur un dauphin (Venus on a Dolphin).

The attribution of other works is less certain. A gouache miniature of a balloon ascent over Paris held by the Museo Lázaro Galdiano in Madrid was originally attributed to Diane-Hélène van Blarenberghe. Attribution was later reassigned to her father after comparison with securely signed works, although the softer application of colour and less precise handling of figures were noted as atypical of Henri-Joseph. Nathalie Lemoine-Bouchard has suggested that Le château et les douves de Jarnac, près d'Angoulême (The Château and Moat at Jarnac, near Angoulême), attributed to Henri-Joseph, was actually painted by Hélène.

After the death of her father in 1826, Hélène van Blarenberghe committed herself to preserving and continuing the artistic legacy of her family. She produced copies of works by both her father and her grandfather, Louis-Nicolas van Blarenberghe, and gathered and maintained their drawings, preserving the family's body of work for posterity.

== Legacy ==
With the death of Hélène van Blarenberghe in 1853, the Van Blarenberghe artistic dynasty, which had spanned the entire eighteenth century, came to a close. After the death of Henri-Joseph van Blarenberghe, the family heritage was divided between Hélène and her sister Eugénie Dathis. Works from both branches were reunited in an exhibition dedicated to the Van Blarenberghe legacy held at the Louvre in 2006.
