= Interior portrait =

Painting genre that represents a living space

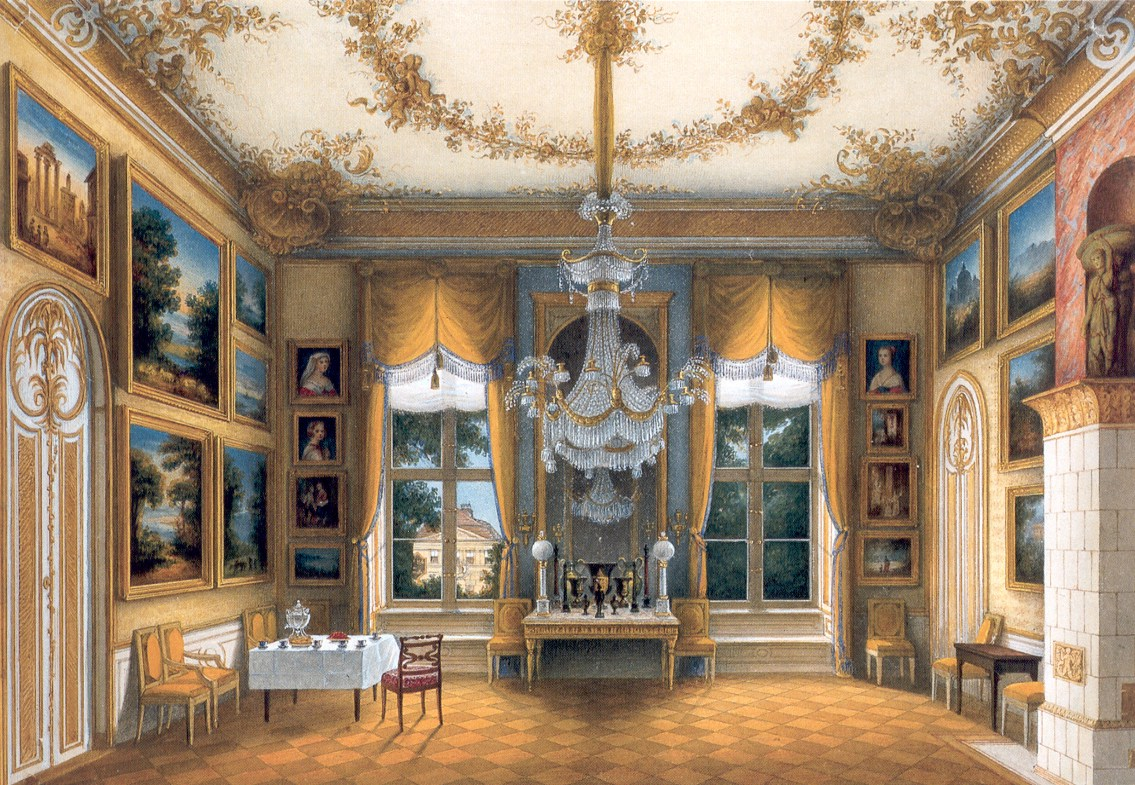
The yellow salon of Queen Louise of Prussia in the City Palace, Potsdam (c.1840), by Friedrich Wilhelm Klose (1804–1863)

The interior portrait (portrait d'intérieur) or, in German, Zimmerbild (room picture), is a pictorial genre that appeared in Europe near the end of the 17th century and enjoyed a great vogue in the second half of the 19th century. It involves a careful, detailed representation of a living space, without any people. These paintings were generally rendered as watercolors and required great technical mastery, if little creativity. By the mid-20th century, although such scenes were still being created, photography had changed this style of painting into a form of intentional archaism.

== Birth of the genre ==
The interior portrait should not be confused with what is called a "conversation piece" in England; a term which designates a scene with a group of people engaged in some activity and often placed outdoors. The true interior piece shows only the room and decor, although previous activity may be suggested by the placement of articles in the room.

This type of scene first appears near the end of the 17th century. At that time, the intent was entirely descriptive. They were usually done specifically to show the contents of an art gallery, personal library or cabinet of curiosities. One of the first known examples depicts the library of Samuel Pepys in London, dating from 1693. They are still valued today by researchers and decorators. In the case of Pepys, it can be seen, firsthand, how a scholar of that time arranges his books in a bookcase (an innovation at that time), uses a lectern, places cushions for his comfort, hangs maps, etc.

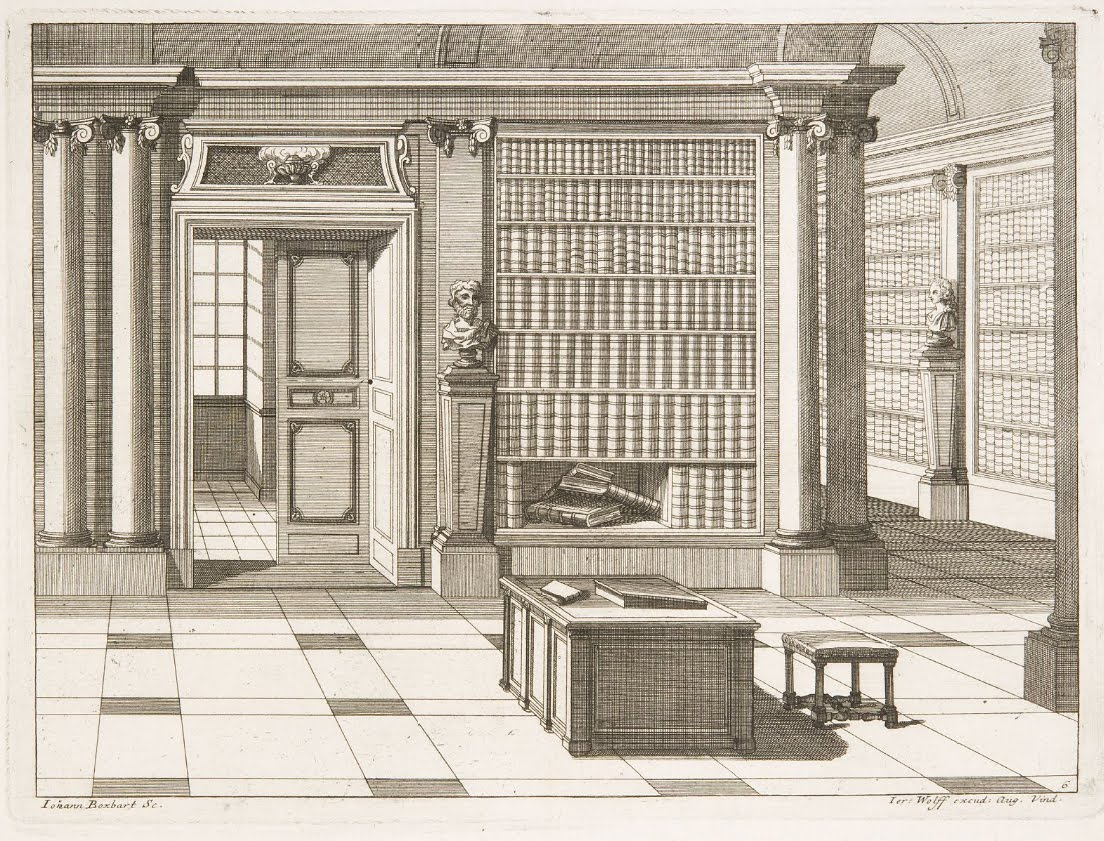
Library project, c.1700. Engraving by Johann Boxbarth (fl.1690–1710)

It was not until the last quarter of the 18th century that a new type of interior portrait with a different intent made its appearance. This type first arose in architectural firms and was done for the benefit of their clients. Great architects such as the James Adam and his brother Robert Adam of Scotland and François-Joseph Bélanger would execute watercolors of their previous projects to entice prospective customers. This created a fad among the wealthy and the nobility to commission paintings of their own rooms, to show off and preserve for posterity. These paintings were often compiled into albums. This craze was particularly prevalent in England. From there, it spread widely throughout Europe.

== Apogee in the 19th century ==
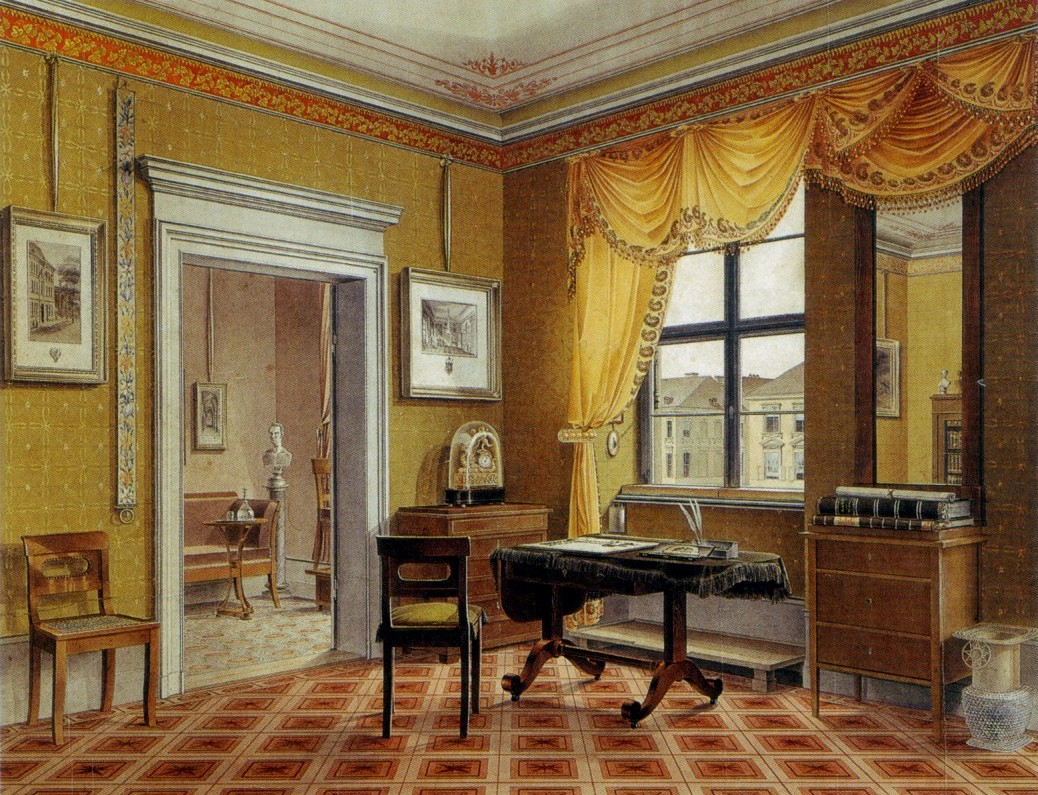
The psychological dimensions of décor: interior portrait by Leopold Zielcke (1791–1861). Berlin, 1825

The first historically important example of the interior portrait represents a small art gallery set up by the Empress Josephine at Malmaison in 1812. In this watercolor by Auguste-Siméon Garneray, we can see her harp, art collection and her shawl, left on an armchair. Thus a new element appears: the psychological elements of the décor and a palpable human presence. One can feel the owner's emotions and thoughts. In this sense, the paintings have truly become "portraits".

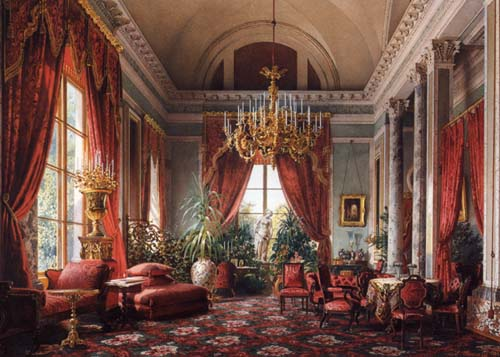
The "petit salon rouge" at the Alexander Palace in Tsarskoye Selo, by Luigi Premazzi (c.1855)

The immense popularity of these paintings in the 19th century can be explained by many factors. Among the nouveau-riche and the bourgeoisie, great importance was given to the home as a place of comfort, intimacy and family. This period also saw a specialization (e.g. separate dining rooms) that were once known only to the very wealthy. These new "middle-classes" were also eager to copy aristocratic tastes and industrialization made a much wider variety of furniture easily affordable. Finally, decorative styles were constantly being changed and resurrected, so interior portraits were a way of preserving one's memories and bequeathing them to the next generation.

Queen Victoria was very fond of these portraits as they allowed her to give the public a look at her family life and the comforts of home in a tasteful manner. The craze was thereby spread throughout the Royal Families of Europe. Due to the number of palaces they possessed (The Winter Palace, Tsarskoye Selo, Gatchina Palace, Peterhof Palace, Pavlovsk Palace...), the Tsars had a lot of interior portraits. Virtually all of their rooms (except the most private ones) were rendered at least once; some several times. These watercolors are considered to be among the best of their genre.

== Speciality artists ==
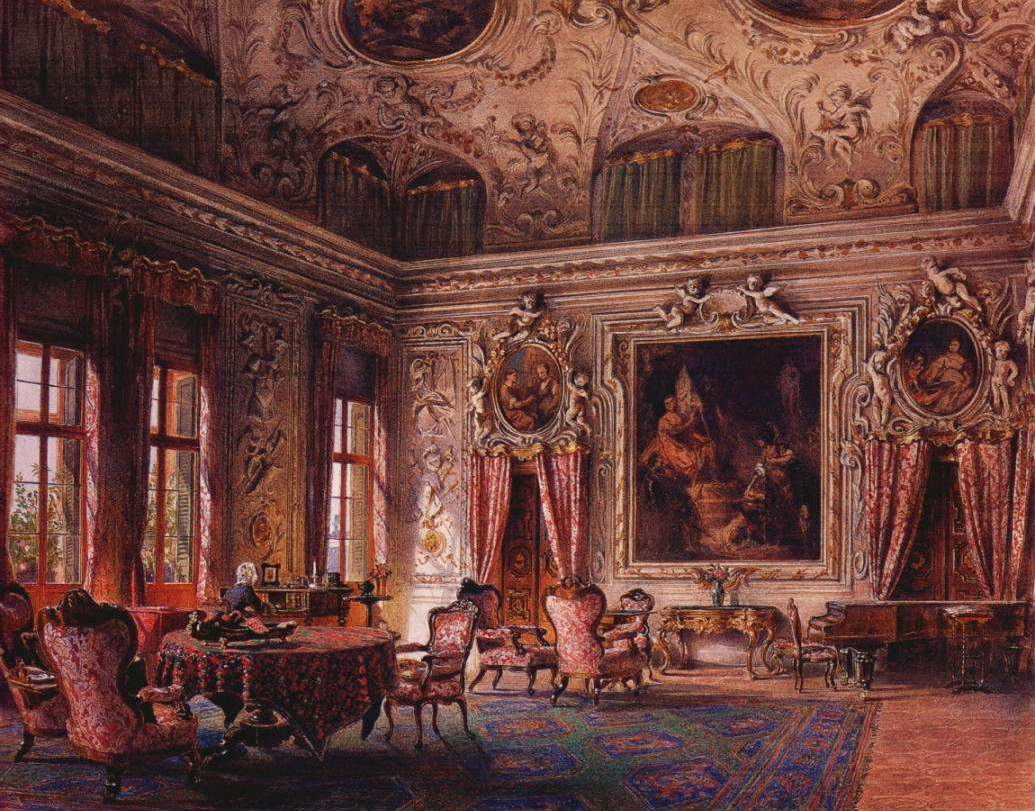
Salon of the Palazzo Barbaro, Venice. Ludwig Passini (1855)

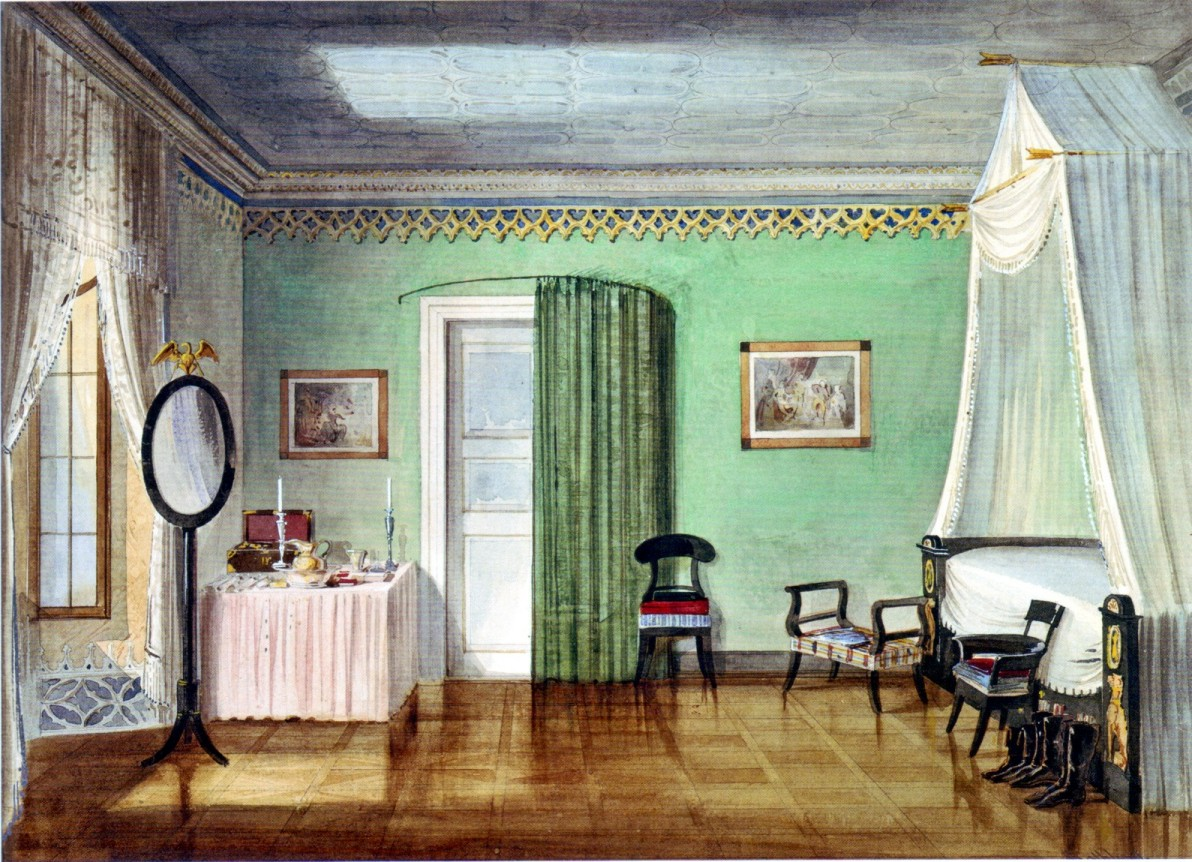
Ferdinand Rothbart, Coburg 1848

At a time when every cultured young woman learned to paint watercolors, many painted their own rooms or the ones where they were given their lessons. Most of the surviving examples are anonymous and rarely of high quality, but they often have a charm that compensates for what they lack in technical expertise.

However, some members of the aristocracy had real talent, verging on the professional. The Polish Count Artur Potocki, for example, travelled widely, painting watercolors of the hotel rooms and other places where he stayed, from Rome to London. High-quality works were often produced by professionals with experience in watercolors and perspective.

With only a few exceptions, such as Jean-Baptiste Isabey and Eugène Lami of France, architect John Nash and furniture-maker Thomas Sheraton (both of England), artists who dealt exclusively with these portraits are unfamiliar today. Among some notable artists who produced them, not previously mentioned:

- In England: William Henry Hunt, Mary Ellen Best, William Henry Pyne
- In France: Charles Percier, Adrien Dauzats
- In Germany and Austria: Ferdinand Rothbart, Rudolf von Alt, Eduard Gaertner, Emanuel Stöckler
- In Russia: Eduard Hau, Vasily Sadovnikov, Konstantin Ukhtomsky, Grigory Chernetsov, Nikanor Chernetsov (his brother), Alexander Brullov, Karl Brullov (his brother), Pyotr Sokolov, Orest Kiprensky, Alexey Venetsianov
- In Poland, Aleksander Gryglewski

== Recent expositions ==
- House Proud: Nineteenth-century Watercolor Interiors from the Thaw Collection, Cooper-Hewith National Design Museum (a division of the Smithsonian, New York, 12 August 2008 – 25 January 2009
- Mario Praz – Scènes d'intérieur, Bibliothèque Marmottan, Boulogne-Billancourt, 20 November 2002 – 15 February 2003
