= Ferdinand Rothbart =

German painter (1823–1899)

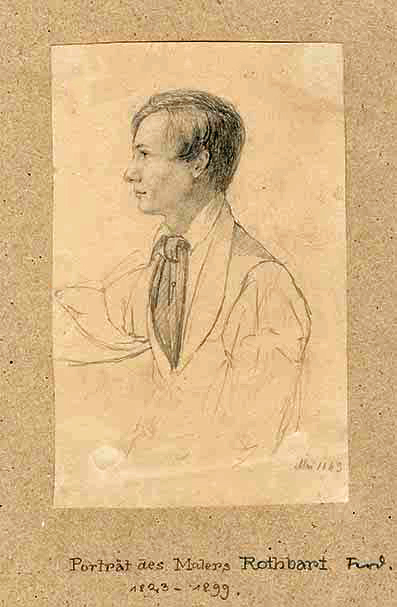
Ferdinand Rothbart Drawing by Albrecht Fürchtegott Schultheiss (1843)

Ferdinand Rothbart (3 October 1823, Roth – 31 January 1899, Munich) was a German draftsman, illustrator and history painter. He also served as curator for the Staatliche Graphische Sammlung in Munich.

== Life ==
When he was a young child, he moved with his family to Nuremberg, where his father owned a wire braiding factory. Shortly thereafter, his father died, and Ferdinand's mother had to support the family by sewing. At the age of five, a guardian took him and his older brother to an orphanage, where they received vocational training. He went on to learn etching, lithography and map coloring at the firm of H. L. Petersen.

From 1845 to 1848, he executed a series of watercolors for Ernest I, Duke of Saxe-Coburg and Gotha: interior portraits of rooms at the various ducal residences in Coburg (Rosenau, Ehrenburg) and Gotha (Schloss Friedrichsthal, Winterpalais).

In 1855, he moved to Munich and became a freelance book illustrator, publishing some of his own works directly, as well. He also studied painting, and produced many genre works with landscape or architectural backgrounds. His health was fragile, due to repeated haemorrhages, but he was able to live in Rome from 1860 to 1863, having received a scholarship from the "Martin von Wagner Foundation". While there, he worked as a librarian in addition to his painting.

In 1871, he was hired as curator for the "Königlichen Kupferstich- und Handzeichnungs-Cabinet" (Royal Engraving and Sketch Collection, now the Staatliche Graphische Sammlung) in Munich. While there, he strove to make the works of the old masters available to a wider audience.

He developed severe asthma in 1885, which forced his retirement. After spending recovery time in several spas, he returned to painting and illustrating. Health permitting, he continued to take part in all the affairs of the Munich art community.

== Selected works ==
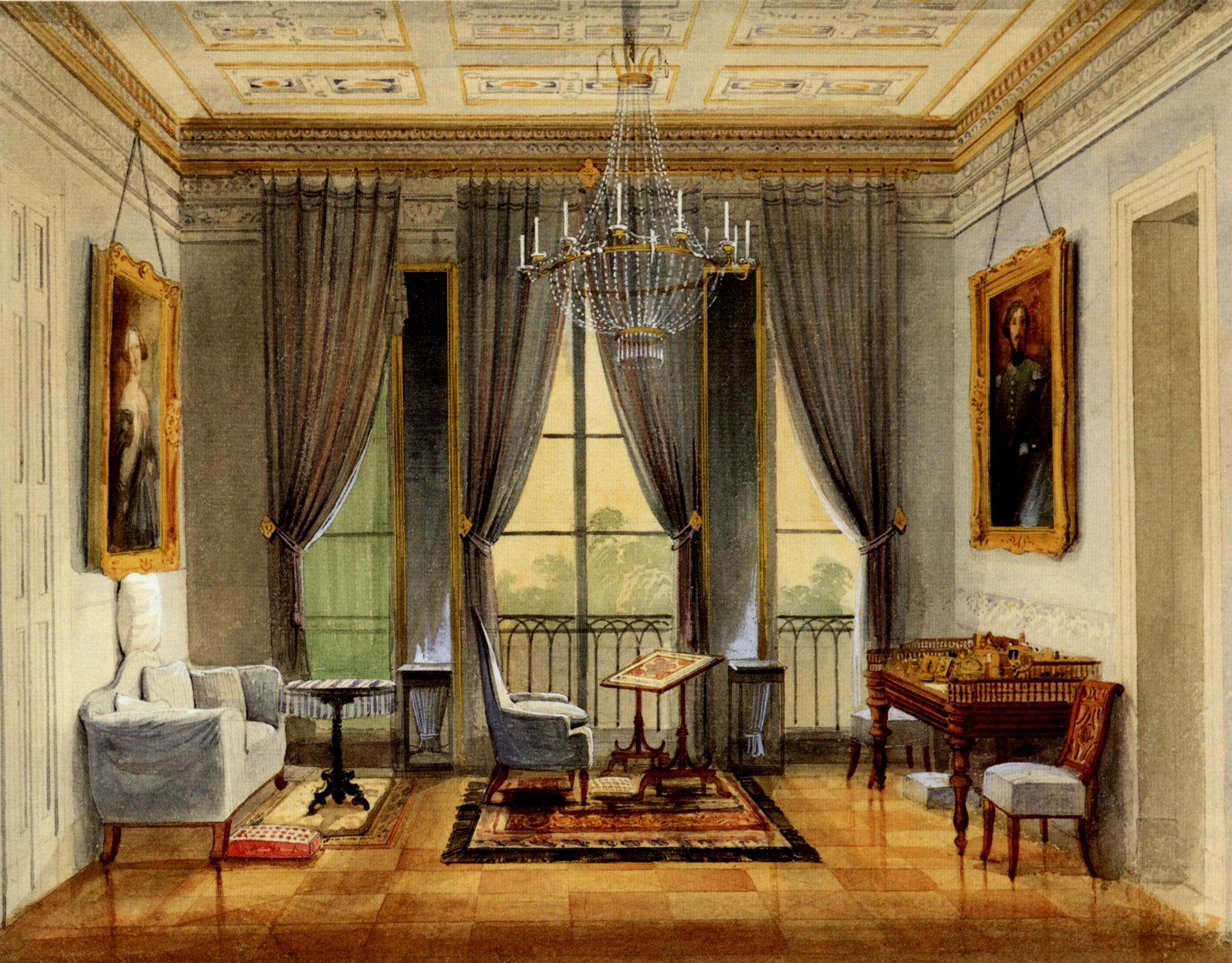
Balcony room in the Winterpalais (1848)

- Illustrations for poems by Ludwig Uhland, in steel engravings by E. Dertinger and A. Schultheiß
- Illustrations for Goethe's Götz von Berlichingen (Berlin). Reissued by the Nabu Press (2012) ISBN 1-2791-3175-6
- Frescoes for the History Gallery at the Bavarian National Museum
- Illustrations for Lessing's Nathan the Wise (Berlin 1868)
- Window for a church in Darley (near Troon), Scotland, showing the Four Evangelists
