= Aleksander Gryglewski =

Polish painter and art professor

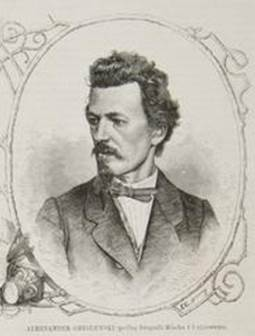
Aleksander Gryglewski; by Franciszek Tegazzo from Tygodnik Illustrowany (1868)

Aleksander Konstanty Gryglewski (4 March 1833 – 28 July 1879) was a Polish painter and art professor at the Kraków Academy of Fine Arts. He is primarily known for his interior portraits of notable buildings throughout Poland.

== Life ==
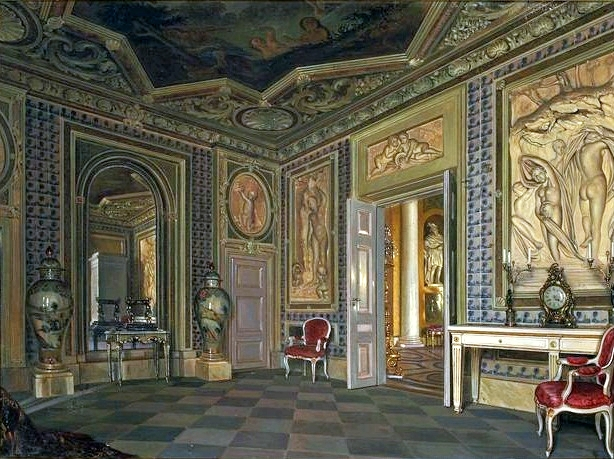
Łazienki Palace bathing room, 1875

He was born in Brzostek. Until 1852, he attended the public schools in Krosno, then took courses in drawing at the academy in Kraków. There, he became a friend of Jan Matejko and followed him to Munich when he went there to continue his studies. Gryglewski returned to Krakow in 1860 and spent the next nine years doing interior portraits of the city's famous buildings; mostly churches. His paintings were reproduced as woodcuts in several publications throughout the early 1870s, including Kłosy (Ears of Corn) and Tygodnik Illustrowany.

He produced similar portraits in Prague and Vienna from 1870 to 1872, notably St. Stephen's Cathedral. Upon his return, he concentrated on portraits of buildings related to Royalty. From 1872 to 1873, he depicted the interior of the Royal Baths at Łazienki Park and, from 1873 to 1875, was at the Royal Castle and the Primate's Palace then, lastly, the Wilanów Palace. From 1875 to 1877, he returned to Krosno to do similar works.

In 1877, he was appointed to the chair of "Perspective" at the academy in Krakow. His most notable pupil there was Piotr Stachiewicz.

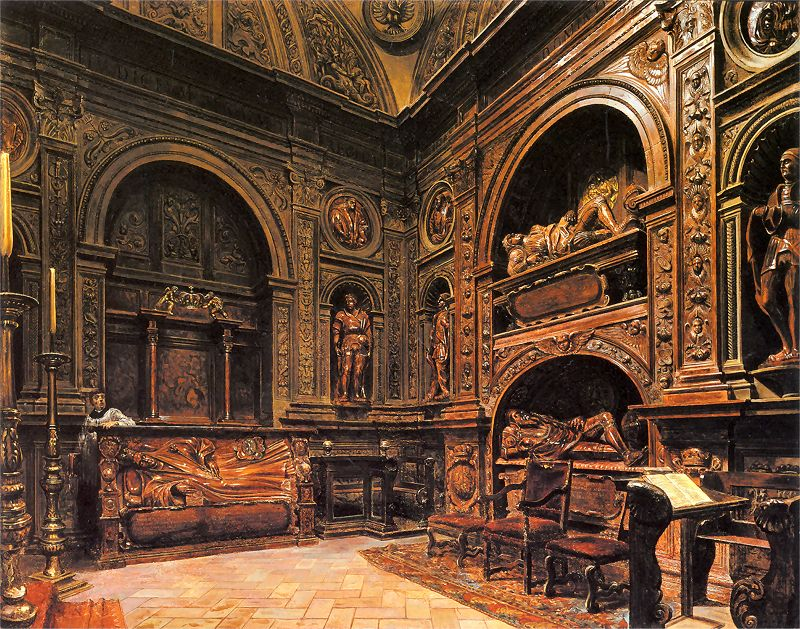
Sigismund's Chapel in Wawel

In 1879, he went to Gdańsk to do interiors of the Main Town Hall. While there, overwhelmed by serious financial problems and depressed by his separation from his wife, he committed suicide by jumping from one of the Town Hall's windows.

== See also ==
- List of Poles
