= Hippolyte Jean-Baptiste Garneray =

French painter

Hippolyte Jean-Baptiste Garneray (1787–1858) was a French painter.

Garneray was the third son of the painter Jean-François Garneray. He was active in history painting, marine painting, engraving, landscape art and watercolour. Garneray's works include Un perron époque Louis XIII (Musée de la Chartreuse de Douai).
