= Henri-Joseph Van Blarenberghe =

French painter

- Born: October 10, 1741; Lille
- Died: December 1, 1826 (aged 85)
- Style: military painting miniature painting historical scenes
- Father: Louis-Nicolas Van Blarenberghe

Henri-Joseph Van Blarenberghe (October 10, 1741 – December 1, 1826) was a French painter.

== Biography ==
He was born in Lille. He descended from a family of painters, of which his father Louis-Nicolas Van Blarenberghe was the best known of the dynasty. His mother's name was Marie-Jeanne Bassecour, and his wife was Charlotte-Rosalie Damesne. The other painters of the same family were Joris Van Blarenberghe (1612–1670), Jacques-Guillaume Van Blarenberghe and Diane-Hélène Van Blarenberghe (1786–1853).

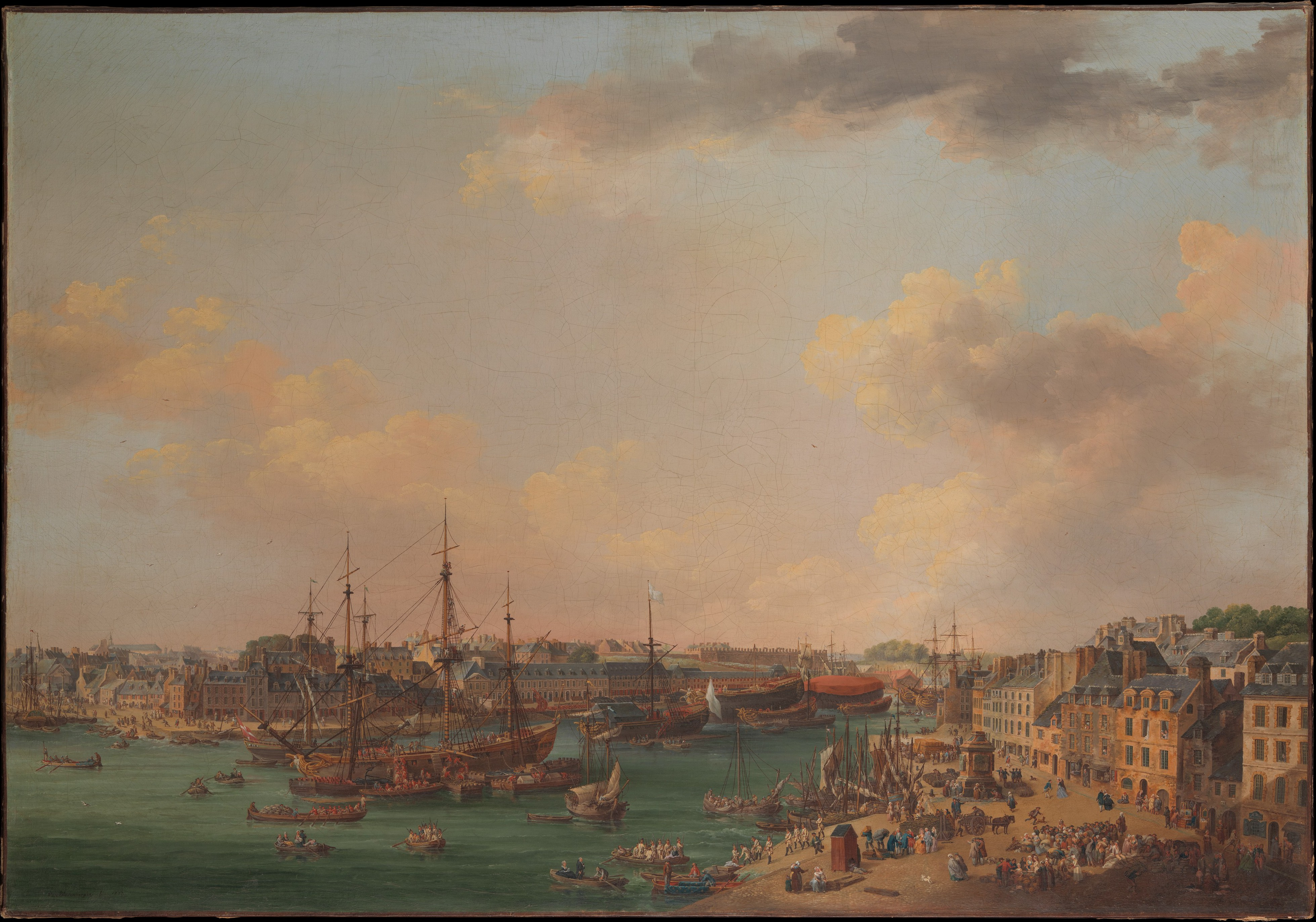
Henri-Joseph Van Blarenberghe, Exterior of the port of Brest, Metropolitan Museum, 1773

During the reign of Louis XVI of France Henri-Joseph became a specialist of battle scenes, due to the fact that he was a military painter in the retinue of the French army, as was his father. He painted the military port of Brest.

He also devoted himself to painting miniatures, to decorate boxes for smoking tobacco, made of wood or precious metals: gilded silver, gold, even gold and platinum. Excellent at capturing the details of clothing and decorations, he finished his little boxes with particular accuracy and grace. On these tiny enameled plaques he created gallant scenes, groups of characters dressed in Turkish style, women in unlikely dresses à la circassienne. An acolyte of these precious boxes is in the Wallace Collection (London).

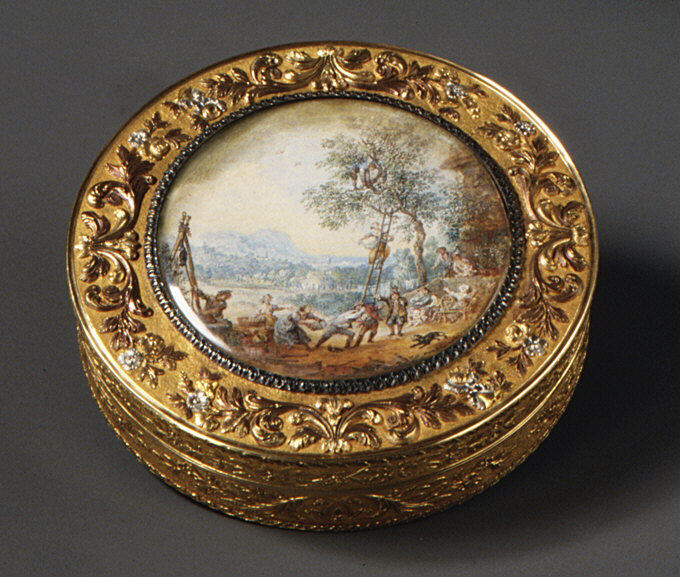
Smoking tobacco box, gold and platinum, with fruit-picking scene, 1820, Metropolitan Museum

During the period of the French Revolution Henri-Joseph Van Blarenberghe devoted himself to painting historical scenes, including the Storming of the Bastille. At the Carnavalet Museum there is a work of his that represents the festive dance in the square that took place on the first anniversary of the historical event.

He made gouaches with court scenes, with pleasant animated landscapes; he also painted with watercolors and oil on canvas, preferring popular festivals, groups of people devoted to daily work, foreshortenings with family interiors, even sports activities such as ice skating. His paintings are a testimony to the life of the time in France. He also painted French patrician homes, such as the Castle of Amboise (Indre-et-Loire), with the famous pagoda that adorns the garden.

He was in charge of teaching drawing to royal princes. He founded and was the first conservator of the Palais des Beaux-Arts de Lille, where his gouaches are preserved. He died in Lille in 1853.

== Bibliography ==
- Maillet-Chassagne, Monique; Pupil, François (2001). Une dynastie de peintres lillois, les Van Blarenberghe (in French). Bernard Giovanangeli. ISBN 978-2-909034-26-3. OCLC 902221311.
- Maillet-Chassagne, Monique (2004). Catalogue raisonneé des oeuvres des Van Blarenberghe (1680-1826) (in Dutch). Soprepart. ISBN 978-2-9522136-0-8. OCLC 738478635.
- de Château-Thierry, Irène; Méjanès, Jean-François (2006). Les Van Blarenberghe des reporters du XVIIIe siècle; [accompagne l'exposition Les Van Blarenberghe, des reporters du XVIIIe siècle organiseée au Paris, au musée du Louvre, du 27 janvier au 30 avril 2006 (in French). Ghent: Ed. Snoeck. ISBN 978-2-35031-049-7. OCLC 846072342.
