= Schloss Friedrichsthal =

Palace in Thuringia

Coordinates: 50.9472°N 10.7109°E

Schloss Friedrichsthal is an 18th-century palace located in Gotha, Thuringia, Germany. It is located east of Friedenstein Palace.

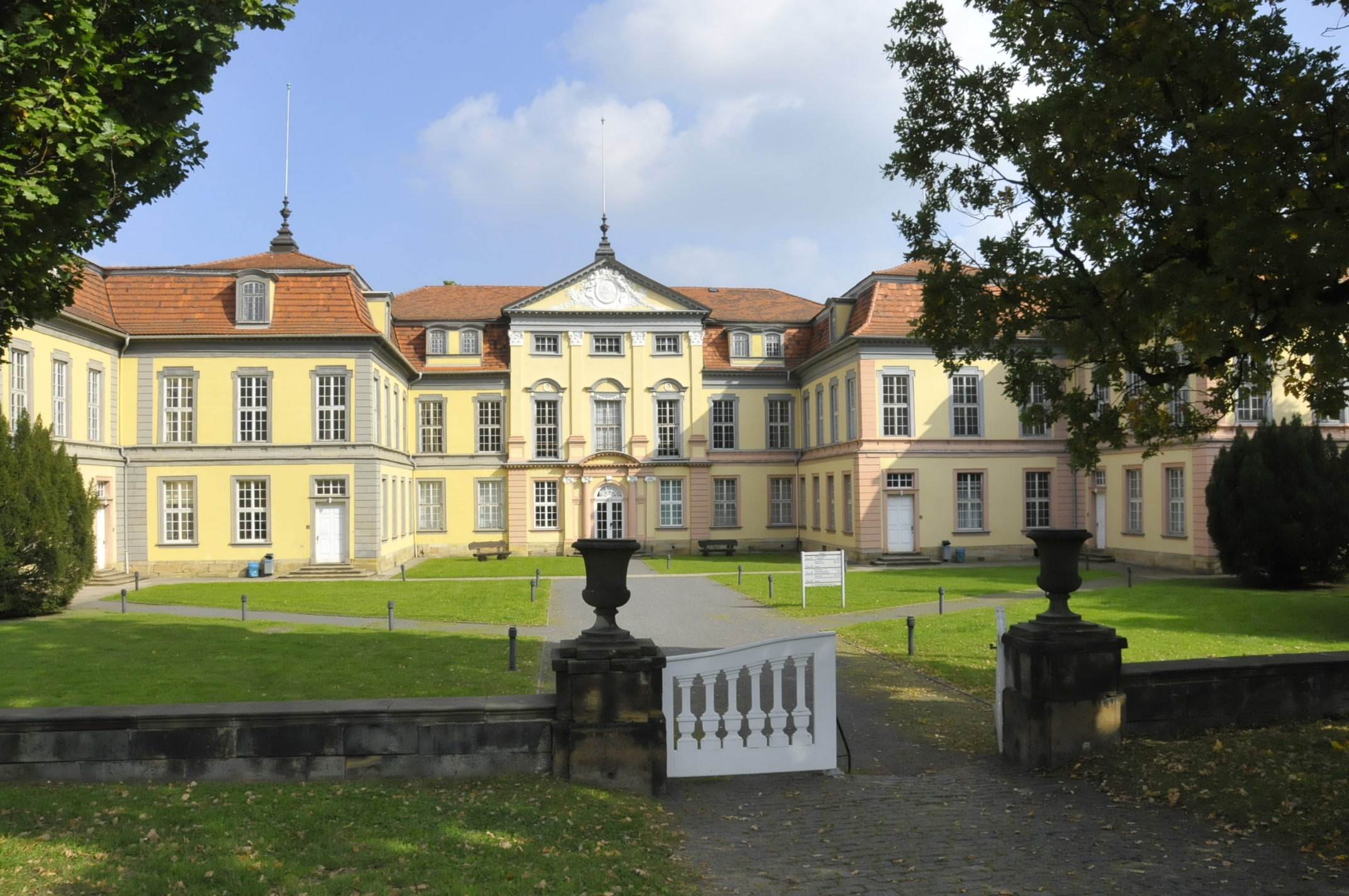
Friedrichsthal Palace

== History ==
Schloss Friedrichsthal was built between 1708 and 1711. The construction process was supervised by chief building director Wolf Christian Zorn von Phobsheim. The palace was initially planned and ordered by Frederick II, Duke of Saxe-Gotha-Altenburg.

The interior of the building has mostly been preserved. Due to numerous modifications of the building's façade, it has greatly changed its outside appearance over the years.

== Function ==
The main function of Schloss Friedrichsthal was as Gotha's state ministry up to 1918. From 1918 to 1945 it served as the district office. The building is now owned by the Gotha city administration.

== Architecture ==
Schloss Friedrichstal was built in the French Baroque style. It has three storeys and a central pediment.

The building is surrounded by a fence. In the past, it was a favorite palace of many aristocrats, including Prince Albert and Queen Victoria.
