= Memorial to the Deportation of Jews from France =

Coordinates: 31.67317°N 35.01436°E

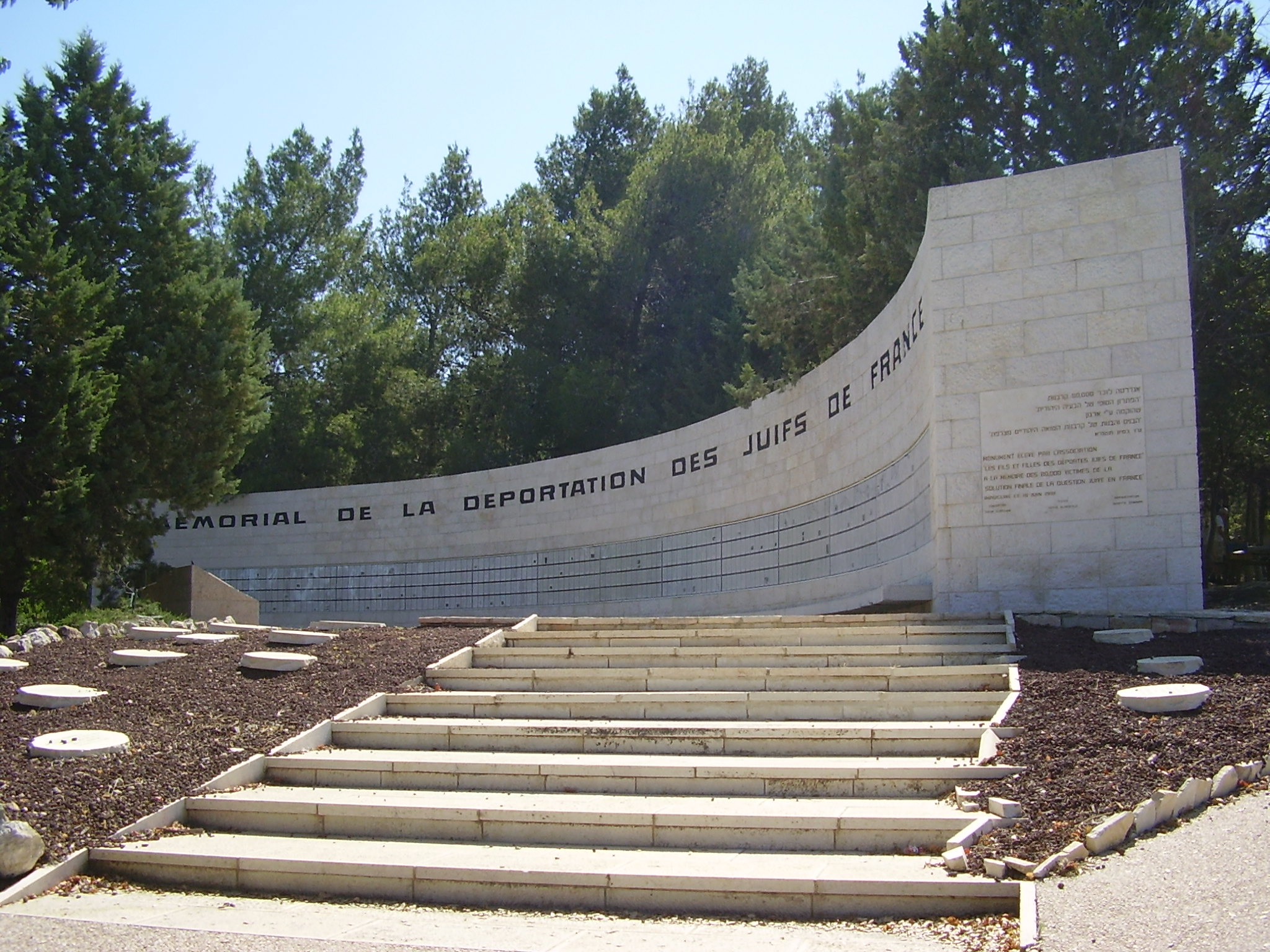
The memorial near Neve Michaels

The Mémorial de la Déportation des Juifs de France (Hebrew יָד לִגֵּירוּשׁ יְהוּדֵי צָרְפַת, translit.: Yad li-Geyrūš Yəhūdey Tsarfat) is a memorial in Israel to the deportation of Jews from France during the National Socialist era.

Located in a pine forest near Beit Shemesh, near Neve Michael in the Elah Valley, the site was built through the initiative of the Association des Fils et Filles des Déportés Juifs de France (Association of the sons and daughters of Jews deported from France), chaired by Beate Klarsfeld and Serge Klarsfeld, and opened on 18 June 1981. The concept was developed by Simon Guerchon. The memorial measures 100 metres in length and 13 metres in height. On the memorial are all of the pages from the book of the same name, Mémorial de la Déportation des Juifs de France, published by Serge and Beate Klarsfeld in 1978, reproduced on fibreglass panels, and which contains the convoys of deportations first and last names and date and place of birth of the deportees. The pine forest around the memorial with 80,000 trees in memory of the 80,000 deported Jews from France was planted by the Jewish National Fund.

Two celebrations take place annually at the monument: On Yom HaShoah, the Day of Remembrance of the Shoah (27 Nisan, April/May), when the members of UNIFAN (Union of Immigrants from France, North Africa and Francophonie, הִתְאַחֲדוּת עוֹלֵי צָרְפַת, צְפוֹן אַפְרִיקָה וְדוֹבְרֵי צָרְפִיתִית, translit.: Hit'aẖdūt 'Ōley Tsarfat, Tsfōn Afrīqah, və-Dōvrey Tsarfatīt) to hold a commemoration ceremony (in the presence of a delegation from the French Embassy) following a workshop in Yad Vashem. On 16 July (the anniversary of the raid on the Velodrom-Vélodrome d'Hiver in Paris), the members of the Aloumim Association (עֲלוּמִים, Association of Israeli Children Hiding in France during the Shoa) pay tribute to their relatives at the Memorial.
