= Jean-François Garneray =

French painter (1755–1837)

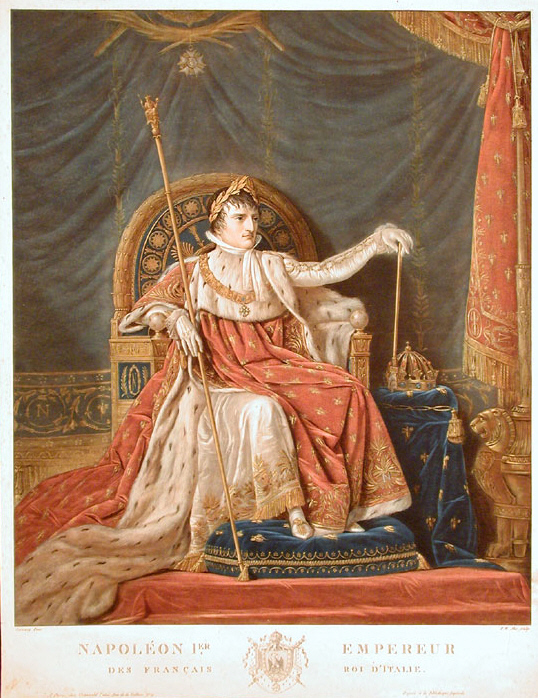
Napoleon I, Emperor of the French, King of Italy - engraving by Pierre-Michel Alix after Jean-François Garneray (c. 1805)

Jean-François Garneray (1755 – 11 June 1837) was a French painter born in Paris. He was a student of Jacques-Louis David.

== Personal ==
He had three sons who were painters:

- Ambroise Louis Garneray (1783–1857), sea painter
- Auguste-Siméon Garneray (1785–1824), troubadour style painter
- Hippolyte Jean-Baptiste Garneray (1787–1858), painter mainly of landscapes and genre

Garneray died in 1837 in Auteuil.

== Selected works ==
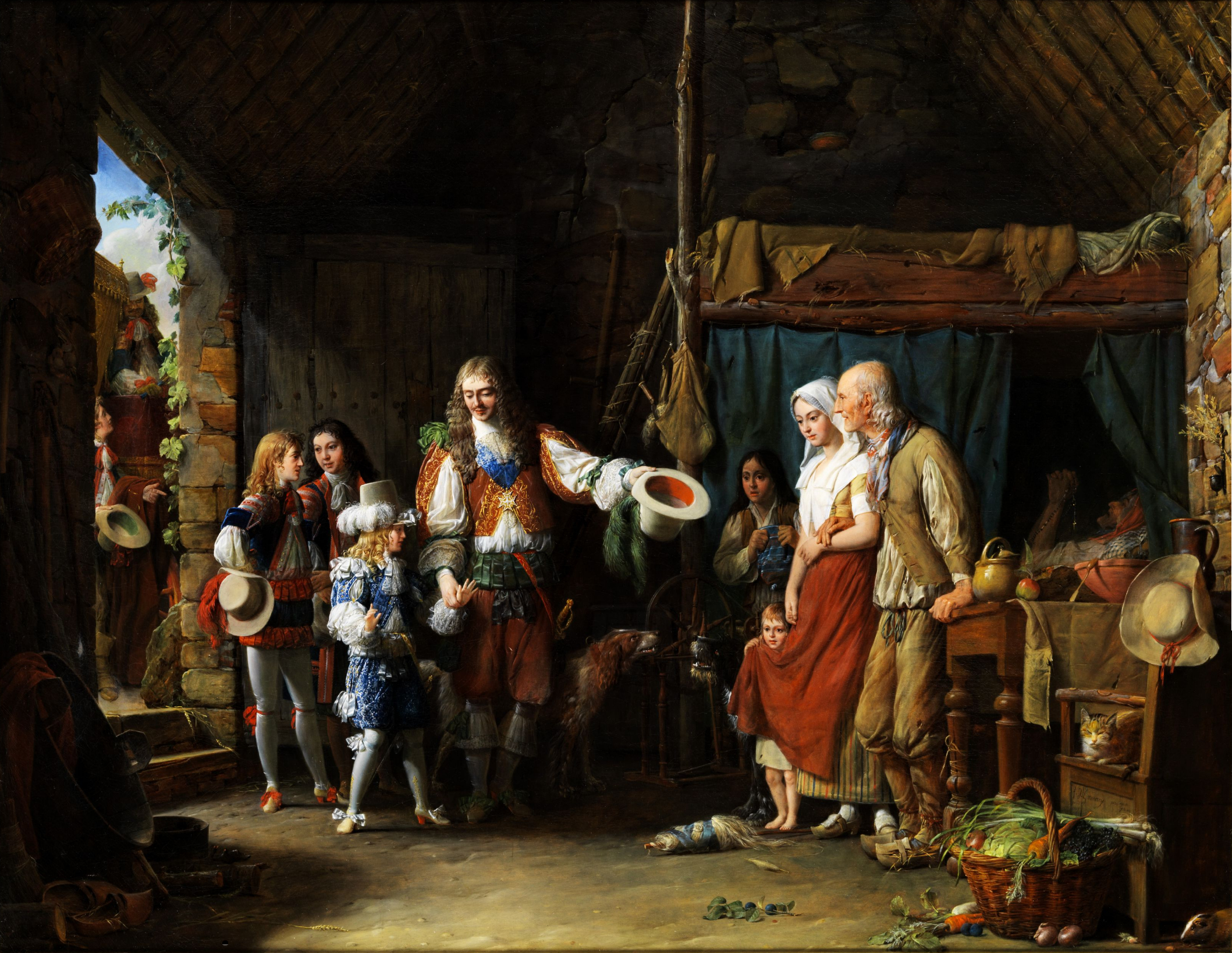
The Grand Dauphin visits a hut, led by the Duc de Montausier

- The grand Dauphin visits a hut, led by the Duc de Montausier - oil on canvas, 113 by 147.6, signed and dated aged 72 years, exhibited at the 1827 Paris Salon with the caption He took advantage of the emotion which caused the young prince to show unaccustomed attention to the misery reigning in this poor man's house, in order to dispose his soul to pity for them and to relieve them for one day, sold for 95,000 euros by the Hampel auction house in Munich on 16 June 2010 as lot 350
- Portrait of Jean-Baptiste Milhaud (Musée du Louvre) - this was long attributed to Garneray's teacher David, due to a dedication reading Au conventionnel Milhaud, son collègue, David-1793 (To the Convention-member Milhaud, his colleague David-1793), but in 1945 Gaston Brière reattributed it to Garneray. A miniature portrait of the same subject, 9 cm in diameter and signed Garneray Ventôse, l'An 2 de la République française (Year 2 of the French Republic), confirmed this attribution.
