= Auguste-Siméon Garneray =

French painter

Auguste-Siméon Garneray (1785 in Paris – 1824) was a French troubadour style painter.

== Life ==
The second of three sons of the painter Jean-François Garneray, Auguste-Siméon studied under Jean-Baptiste Isabey and himself taught queen Hortense and later the duchesse de Berry. He also designed costumes for the Paris Opera. He produced the watercolours commissioned by empress Marie Louise for a Histoire de Mlle de La Vallière, along with the illustrations for an edition of Molière.
