= Papal tombs in Old St. Peter's Basilica =

Burials from 462 to 1591

Coordinates: 41.9022°N 12.4533°E

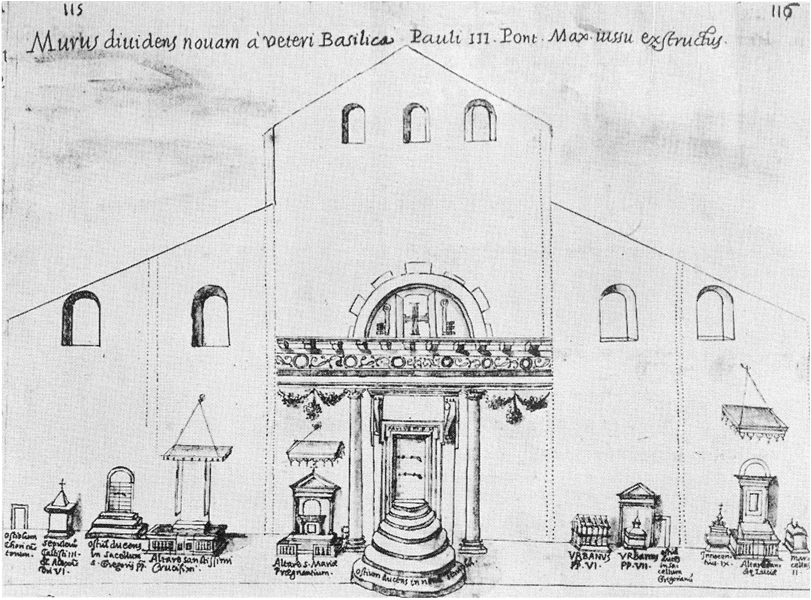
A sketch by Giacomo Grimaldi of the interior of St. Peter's during its reconstruction, showing the temporary placement of some of the tombs

In Old St. Peter's Basilica, the papal tombs were the final resting places of the popes, most of which dated from the 5th to 16th centuries. The majority of these tombs were destroyed during the 16th through 17th century demolition of the basilica, except for one which was destroyed during the Saracen Sack of the church in 846 CE. The remainder were transferred in part to new St. Peter's Basilica, which stands on the site of the original basilica.

== History ==
Along with the repeated translations from the ancient catacombs of Rome and two fourteenth century fires in the Archbasilica of Saint John Lateran, the rebuilding of St. Peter's is responsible for the destruction of approximately half of all papal tombs. As a result, Donato Bramante, the chief architect of modern St. Peter's Basilica, has been remembered as "Mastro Ruinante" ("master wrecker").

Although the original basilica's construction was begun during the reign of emperor Constantine I and completed in the fourth century, Pope Leo I (440–461) was the first pope buried in the Constantian basilica. Over the centuries, both the atrium, chapels, and the nave of the basilica were packed with papal tombs, which were juggled between different sections of the church as construction took place on each section of the basilica. All that remains of the original tombs are a few sarcophagi and sculptural fragments. Allegedly, Pope Julius II, the pope who initiated the destruction of the Constantinian basilica, wished to clear space for a "monstrous" tomb of his own by Michelangelo.

Very little is known about the placement and appearance of the original tombs: one of the most valuable accounts is that of church canon and historian Giacomo Grimaldi (a senator of Genoa and the father of Girolamo Grimaldi-Cavalleroni), who sketched the tombs as they were moved around the basilica on the way to their destruction; Grimaldi's sketches record the shape and complexity of the early tombs, many of which were three-tiered. A few destroyed papal tombs are also detailed in the writings of Alphonsus Ciacconius.

Not all popes were buried in Rome. See list of non-extant papal tombs

== Papal tombs ==
Partially extant, moved, or rebuilt tombs are shown with a darkened background.

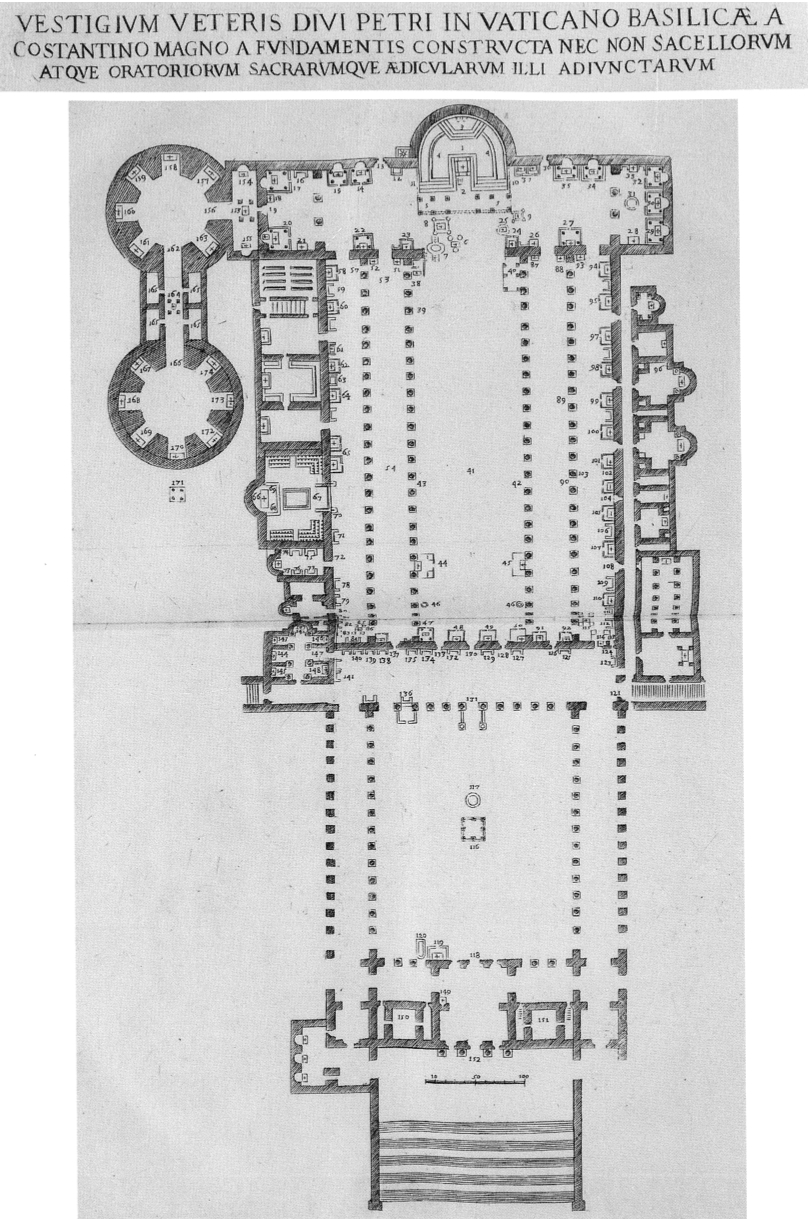
A map, circa 1590, by Tiberio Alfarano of the interior of Old Saint Peter's, noting the locations of the original chapels and tombs.

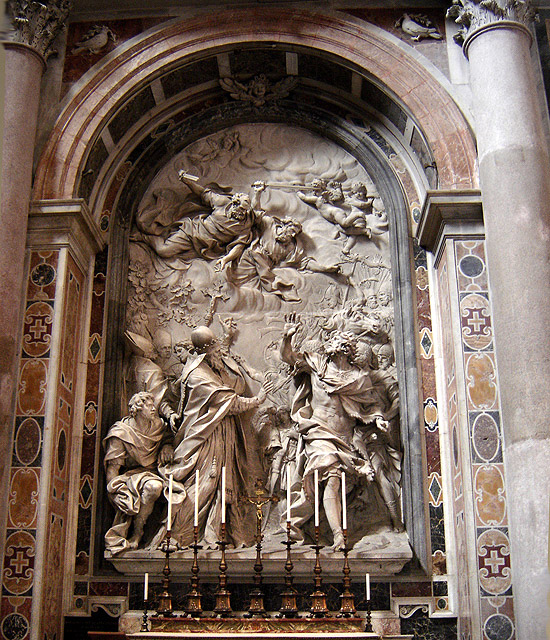
Algardi's Fuga d'Attila, above the altar containing the translated remains of Pope Leo I, "the Great"

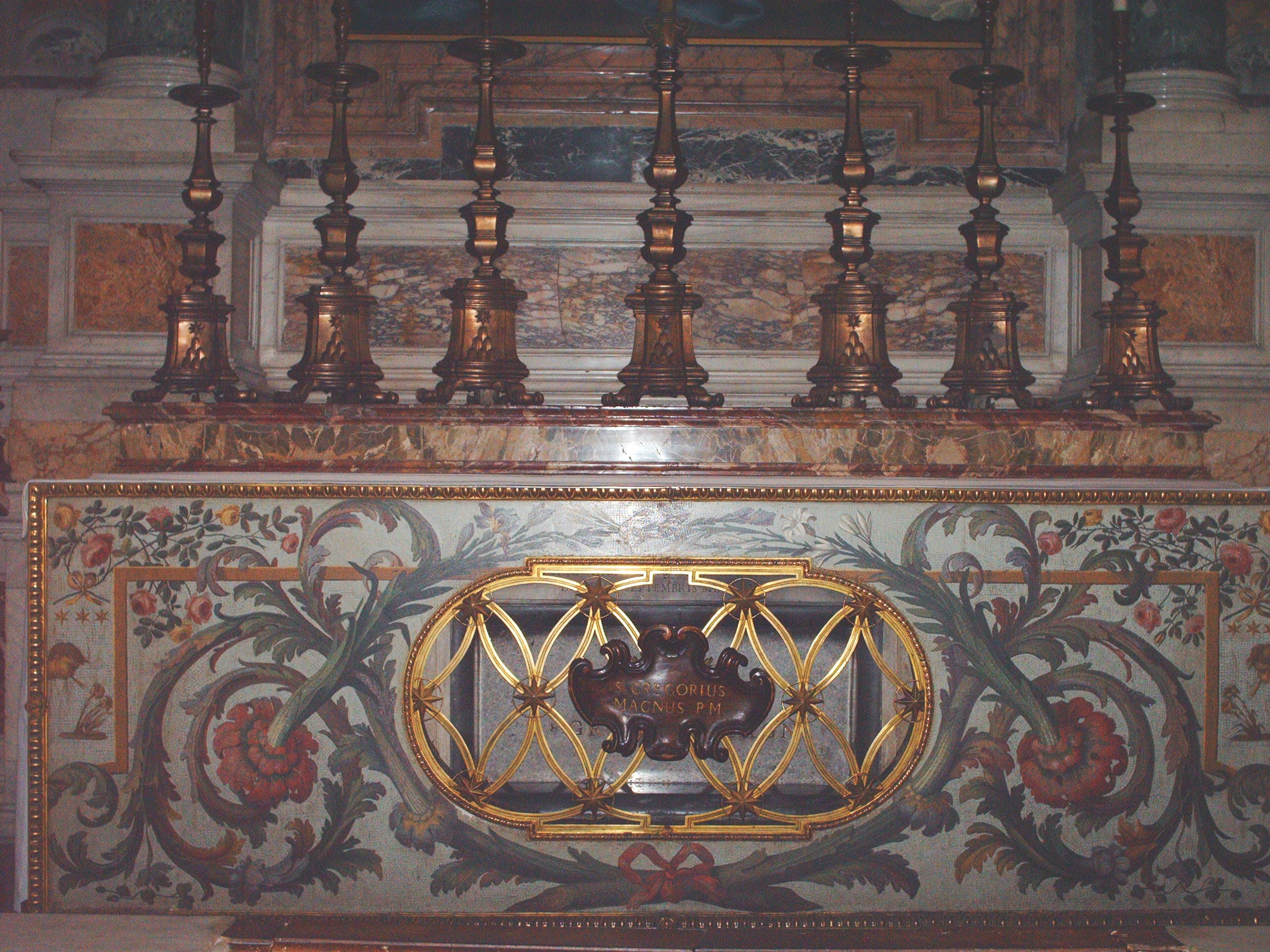
The altar above the translated remains of Pope Gregory I, "the Great"

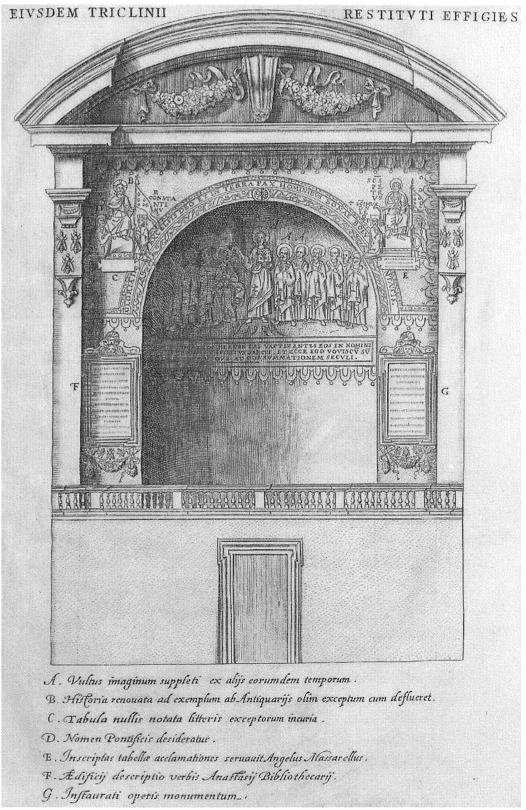
A drawing of the original tomb of Pope Leo III

The atrium of Old St. Peter's Basilica, a popular site for tombs

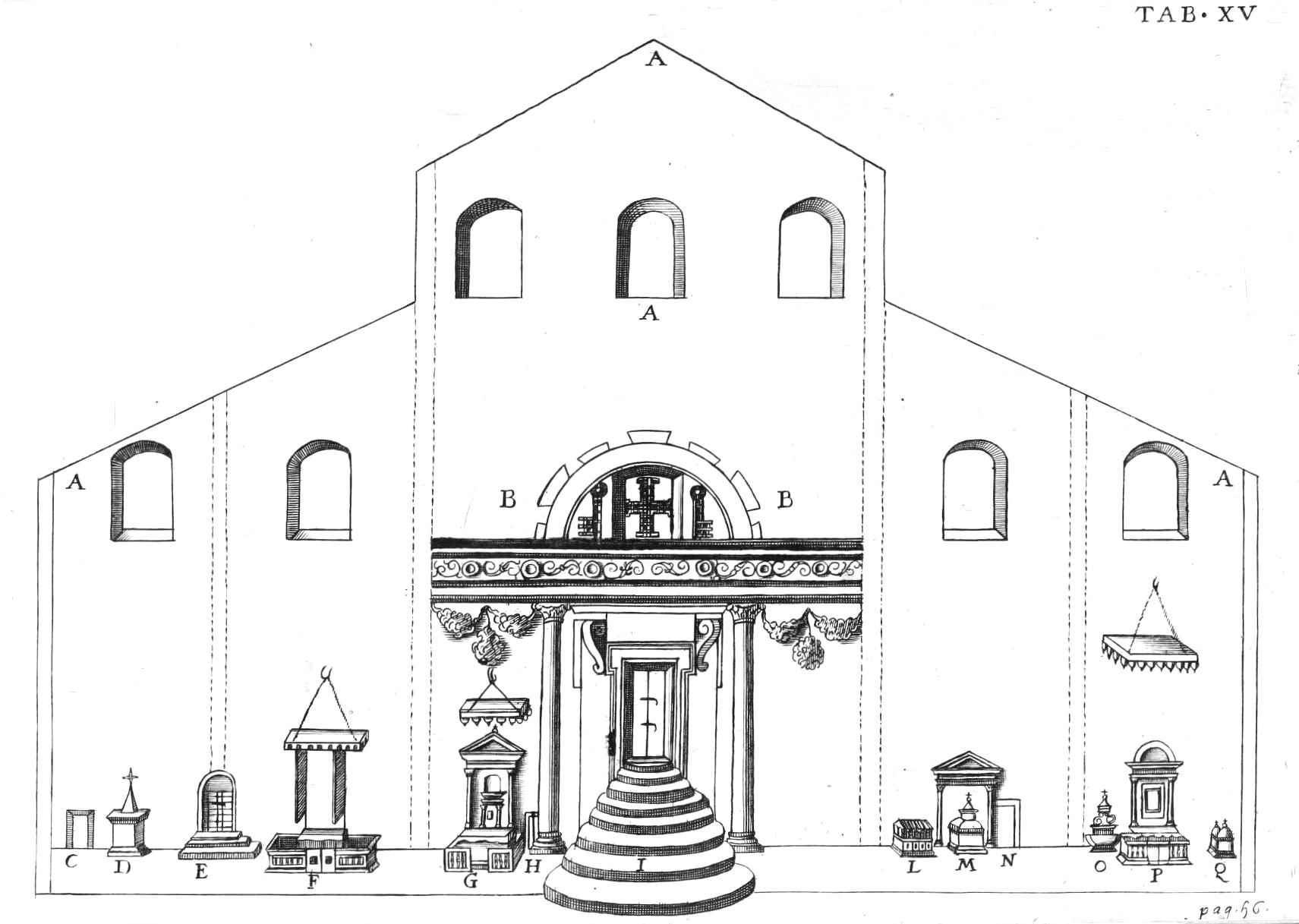
Drawing of papal tombs, from De sacris aedificiis... by Giovanni Ciampini (1693)

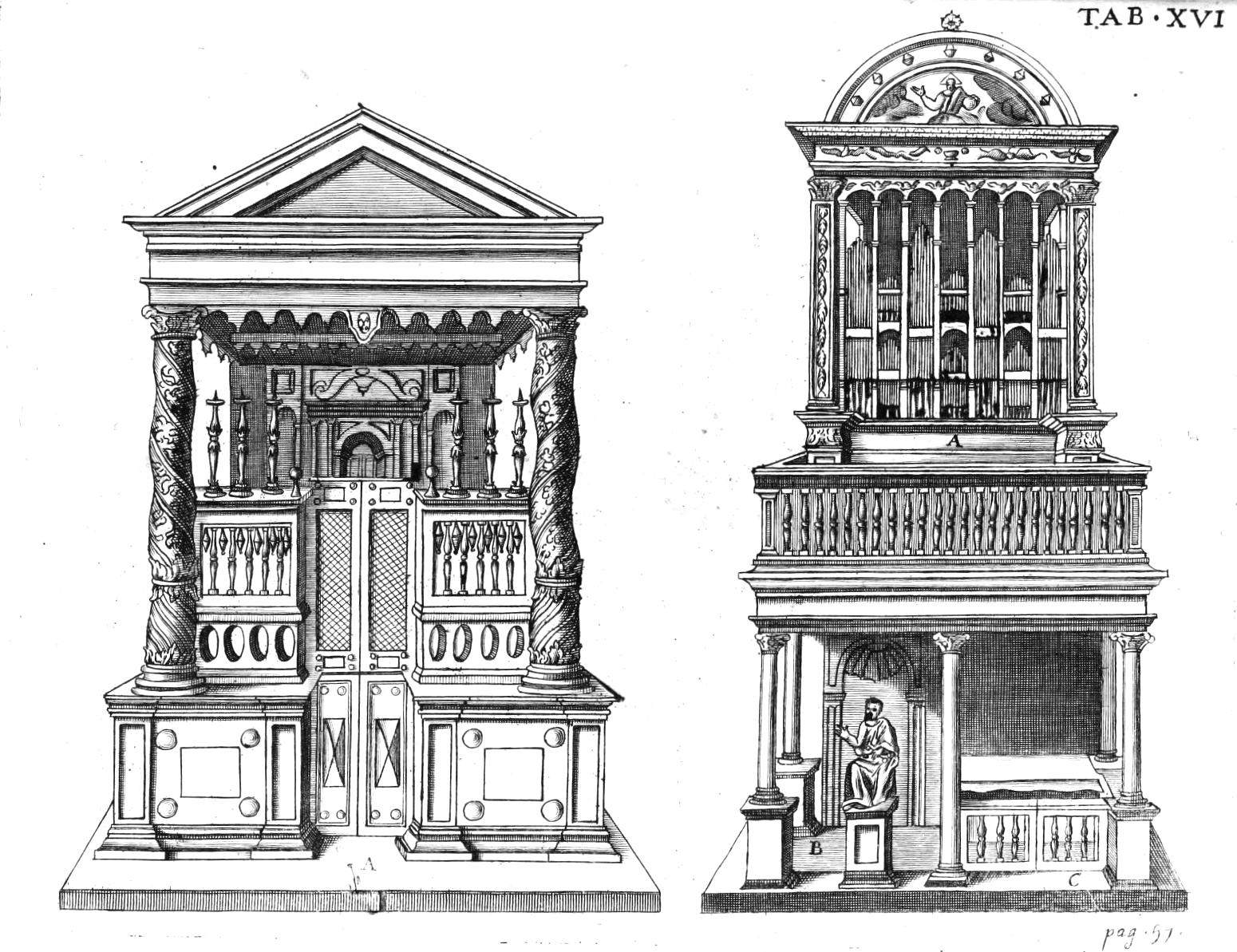
Drawing of papal tombs

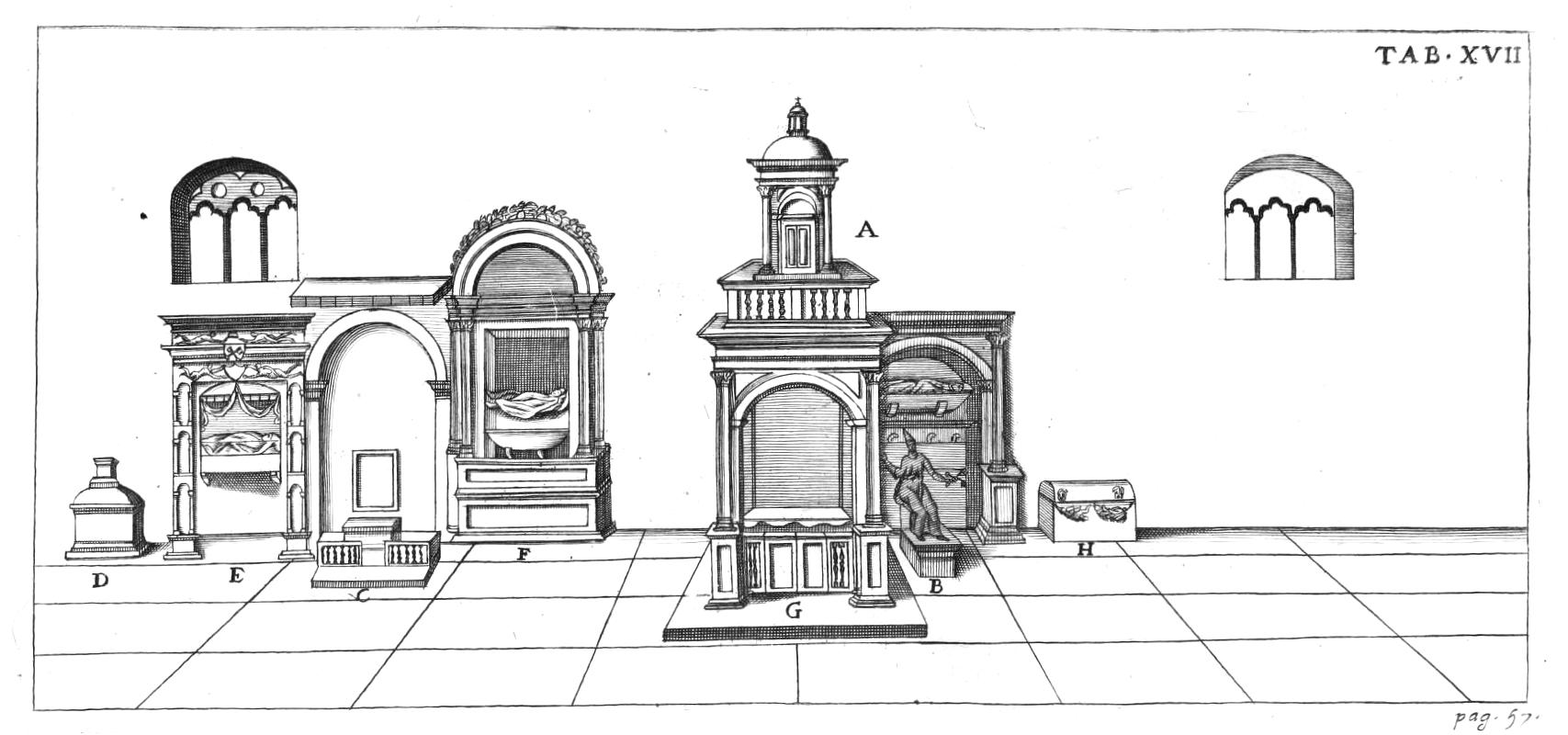
Drawing of papal tombs

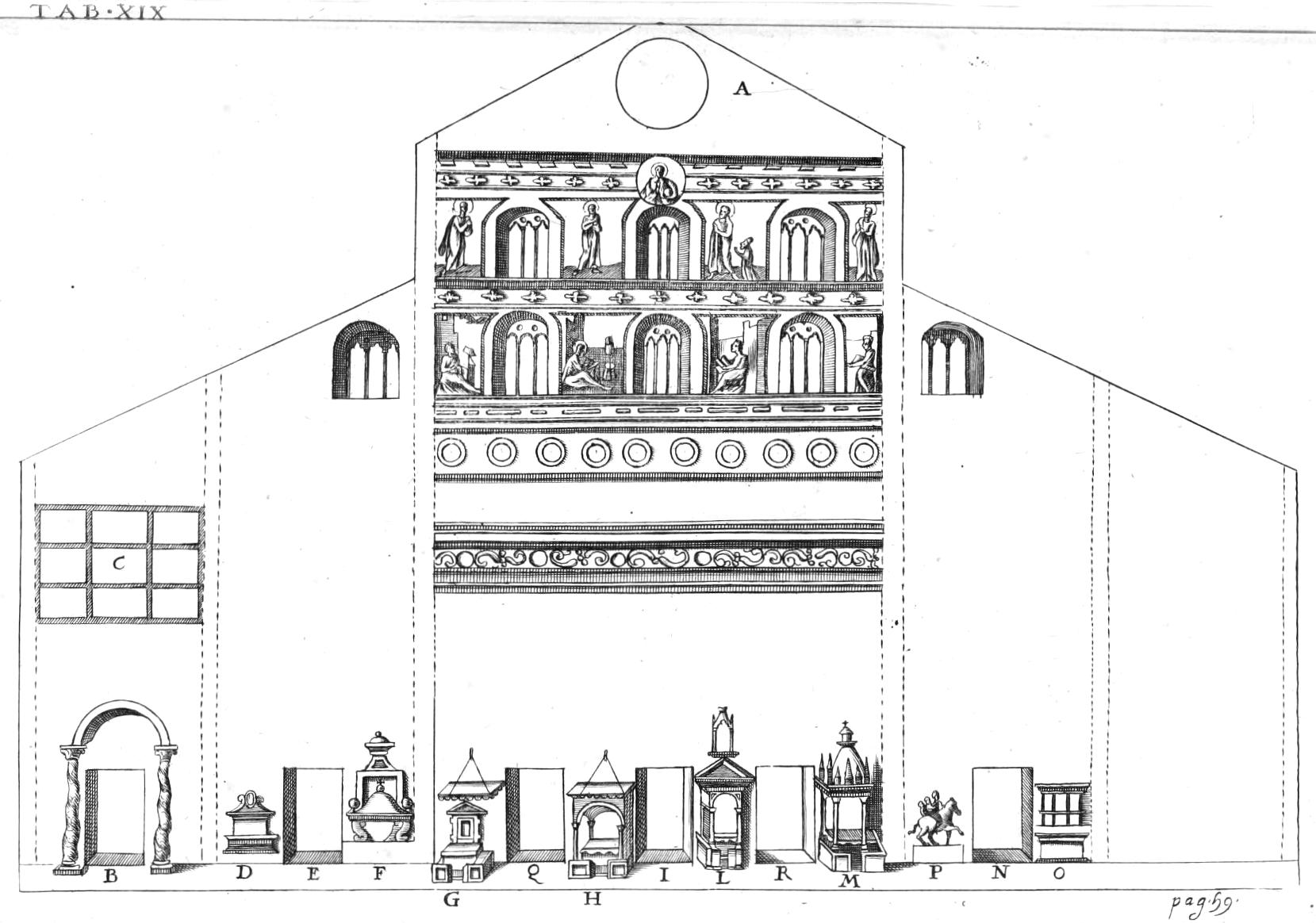
Drawing of papal tombs

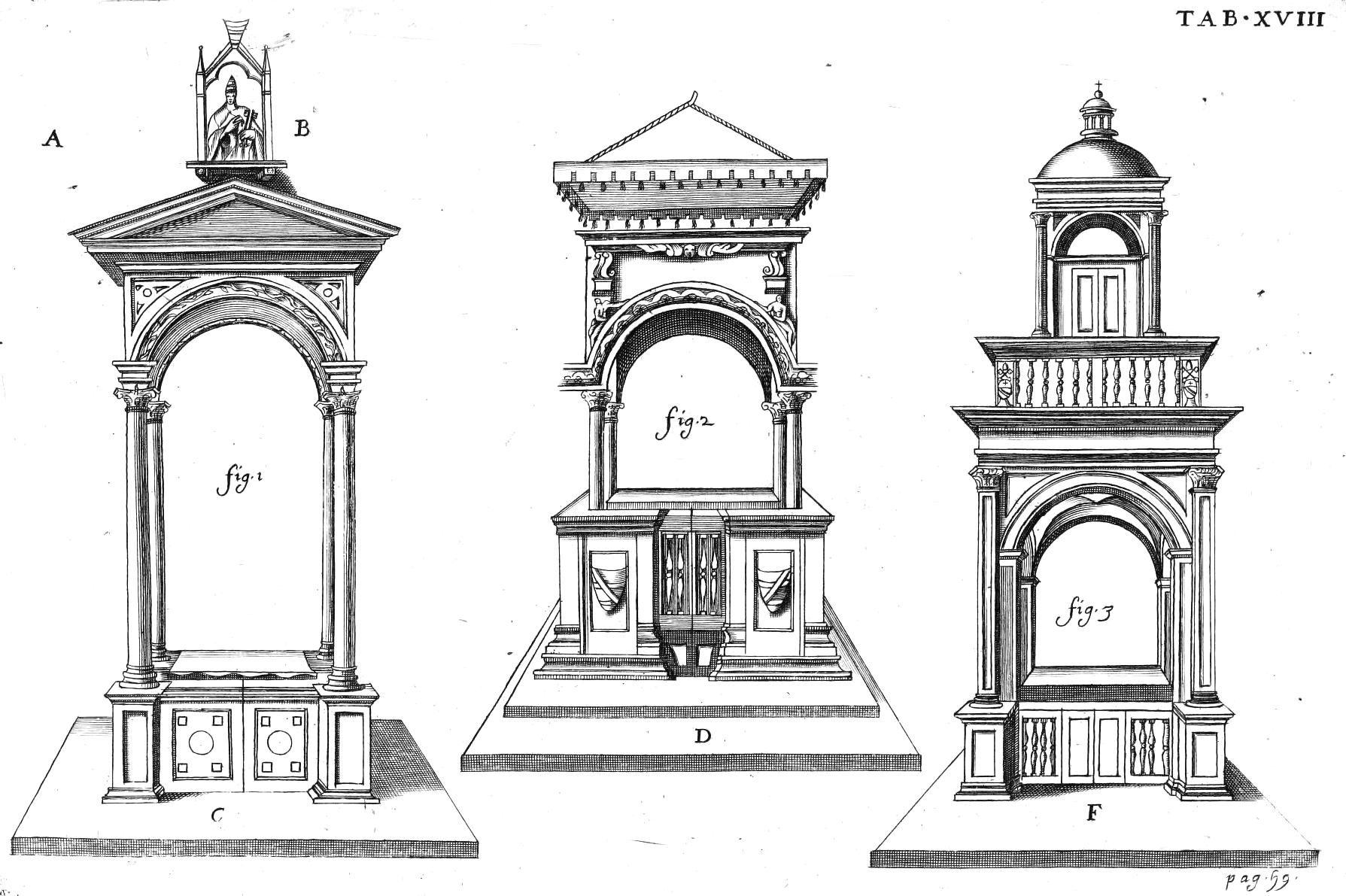
Drawing of papal tombs

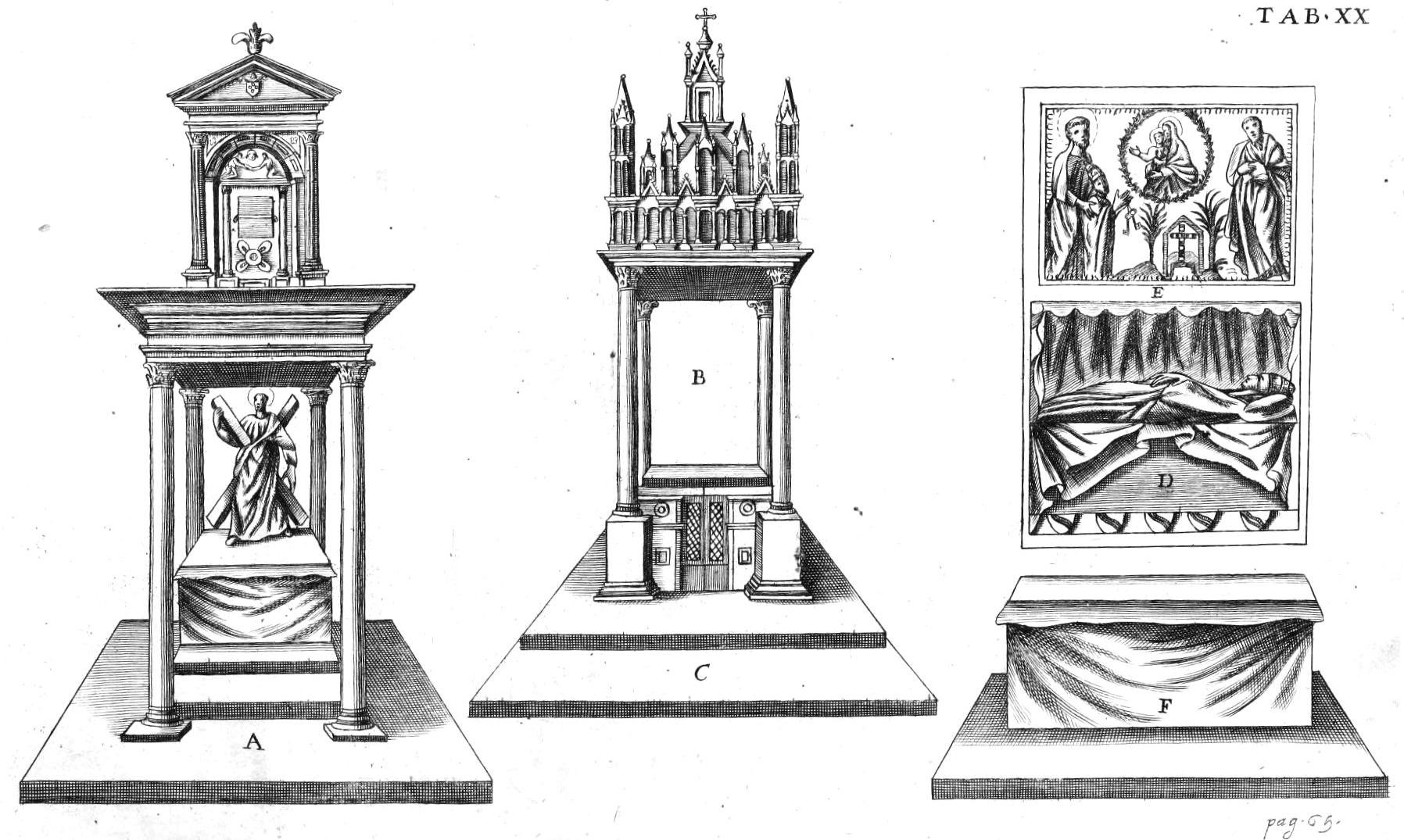
Drawing of papal tombs

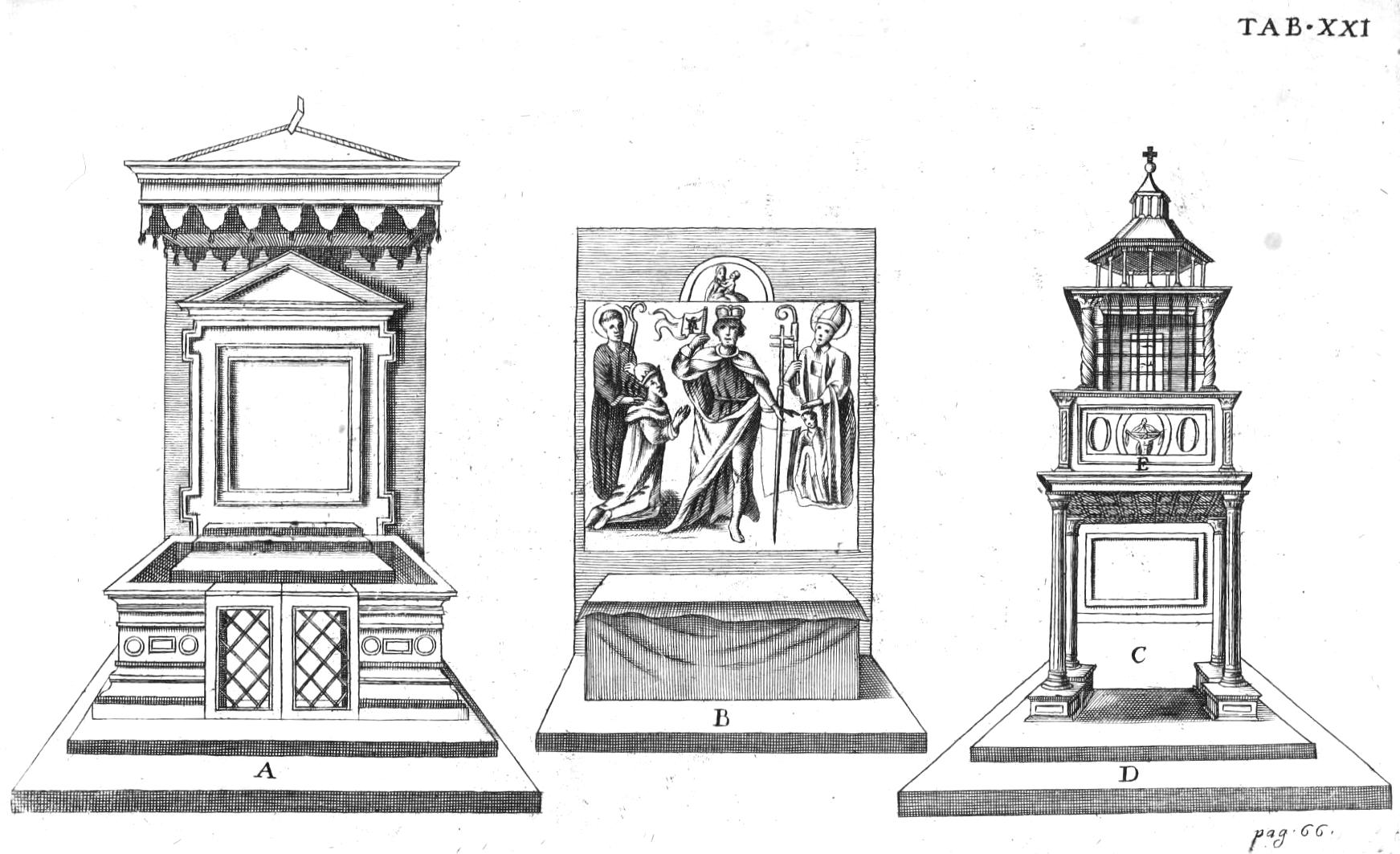
Drawing of papal tombs

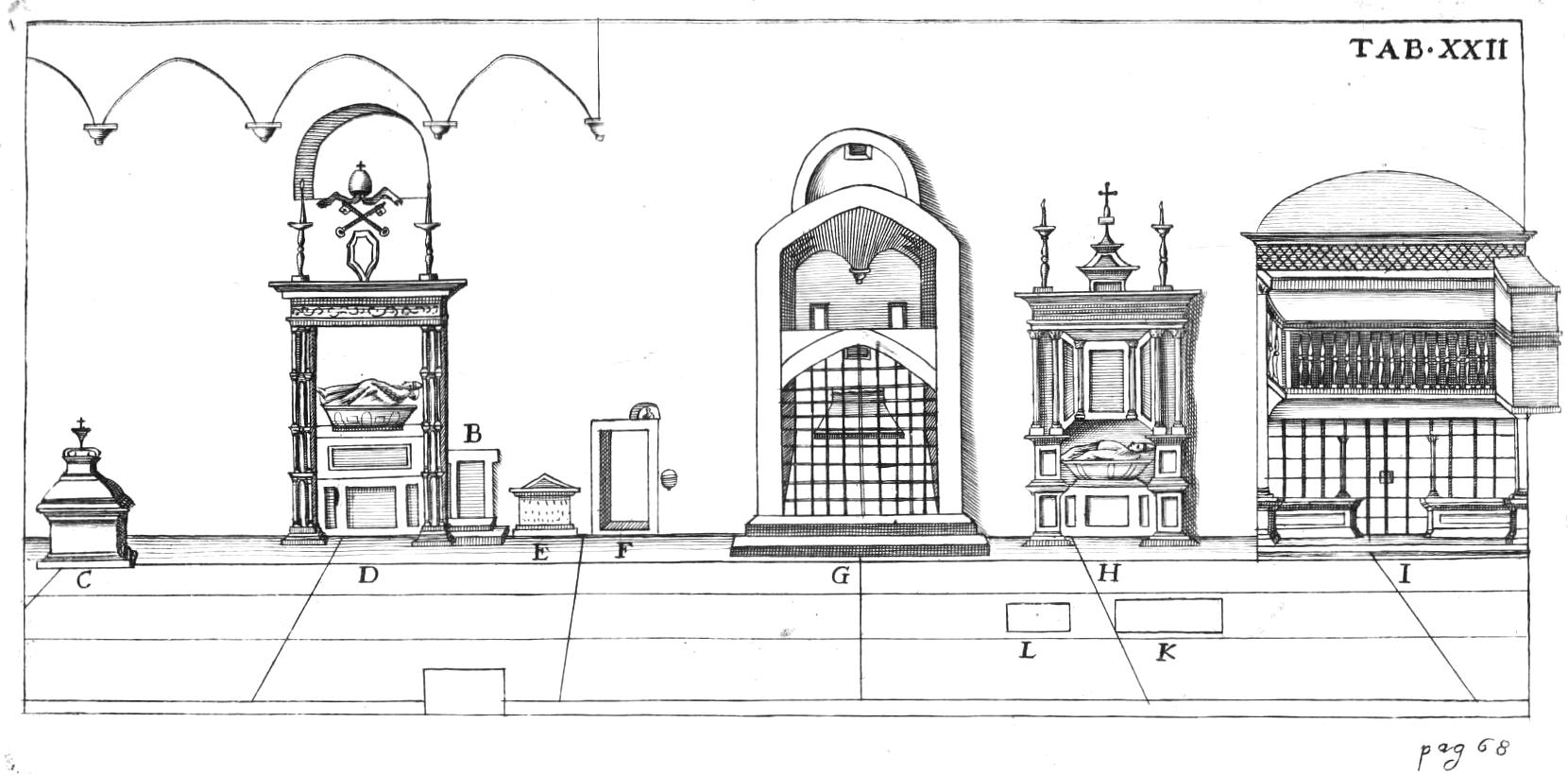
Drawing of papal tombs

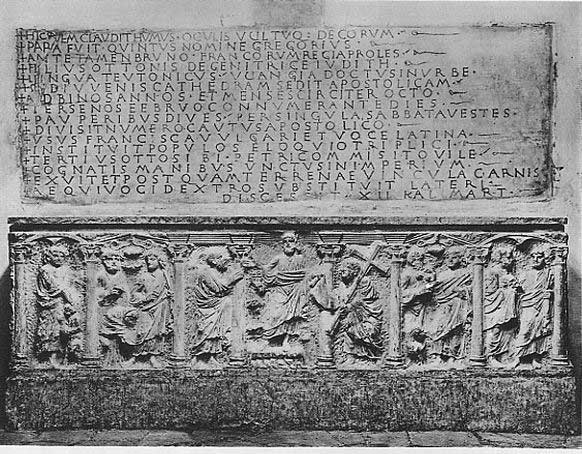
An early Christian sarcophagus in which Pope Gregory V was buried after his tomb was discovered beneath the pavement during the demolition

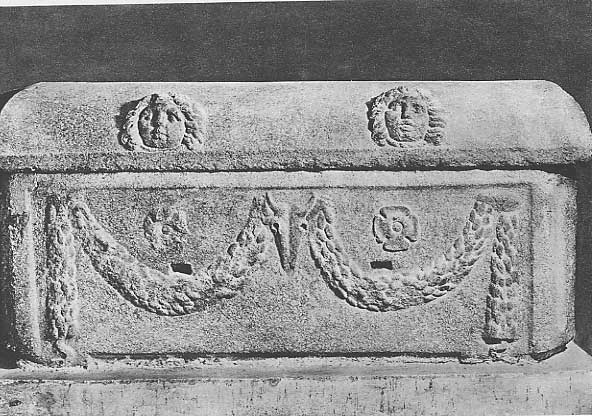
The sarcophagus of Pope Adrian IV, which is extant in the Vatican Grottoes

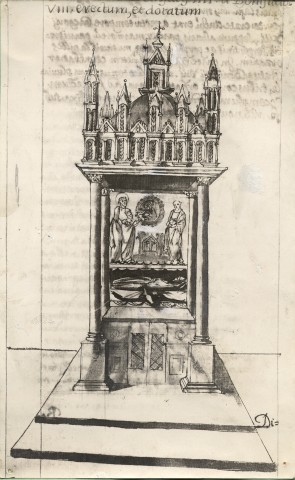
Drawing of the tomb of Boniface VIII together with a shrine to Boniface IV

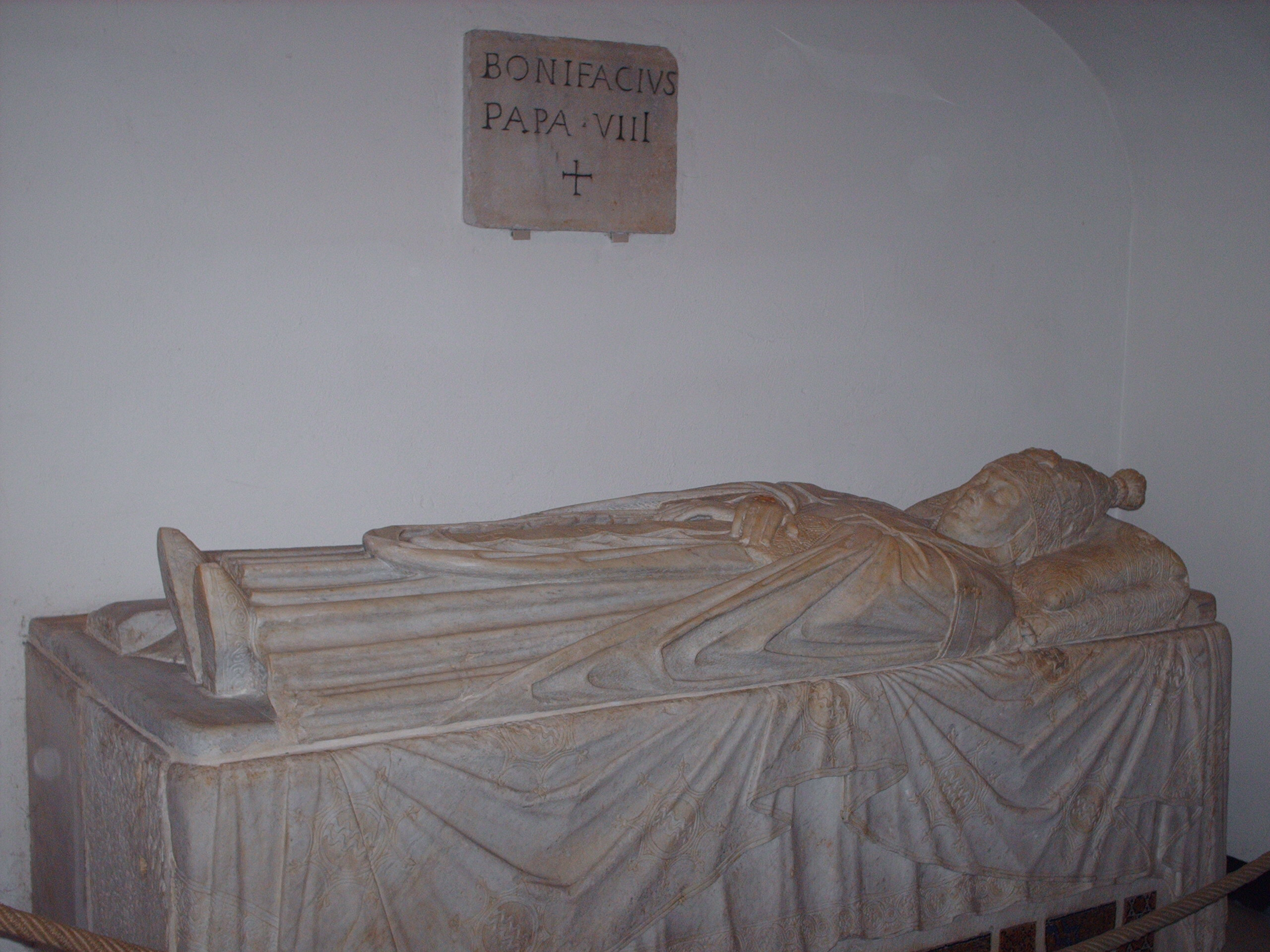
The extant sarcophagus of Boniface VIII

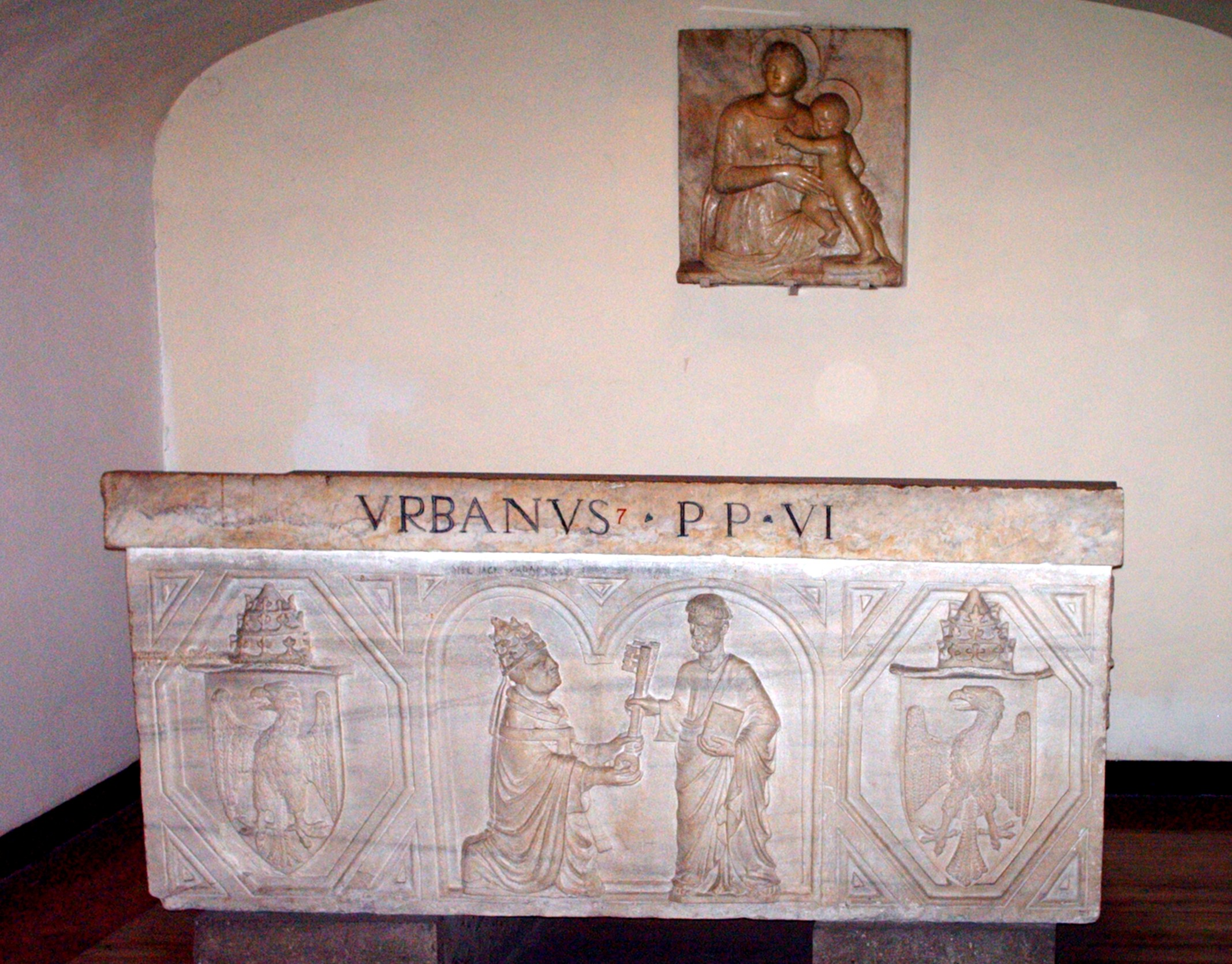
The nearly dumped sarcophagus of Urban VI

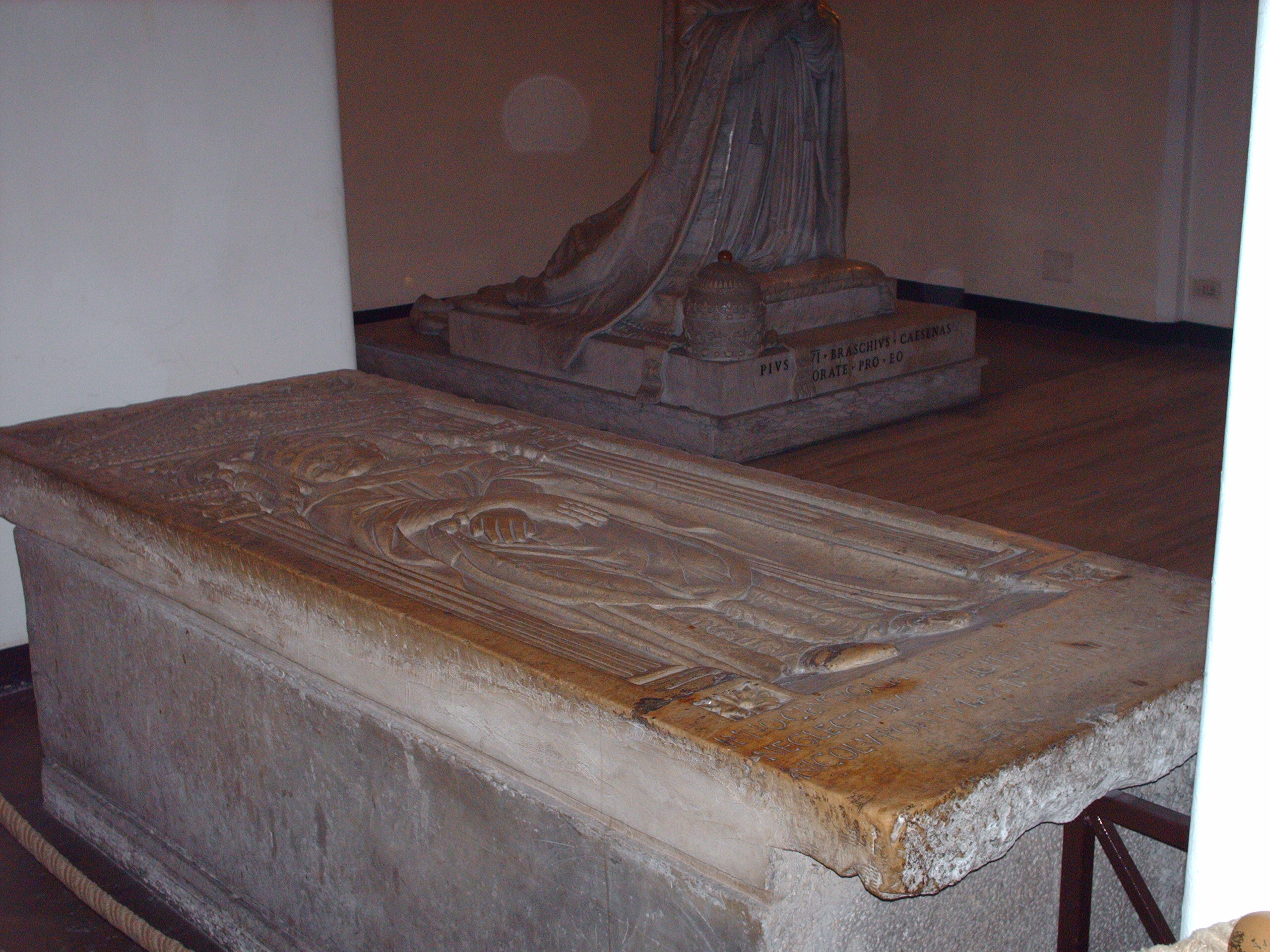
The remains of Pope Innocent VII were translated to a copy of the original sarcophagus.

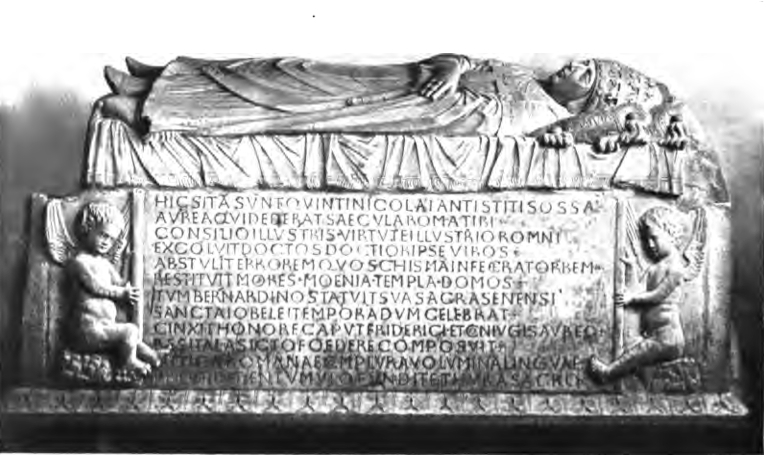
The sarcophagus of Pope Nicholas V

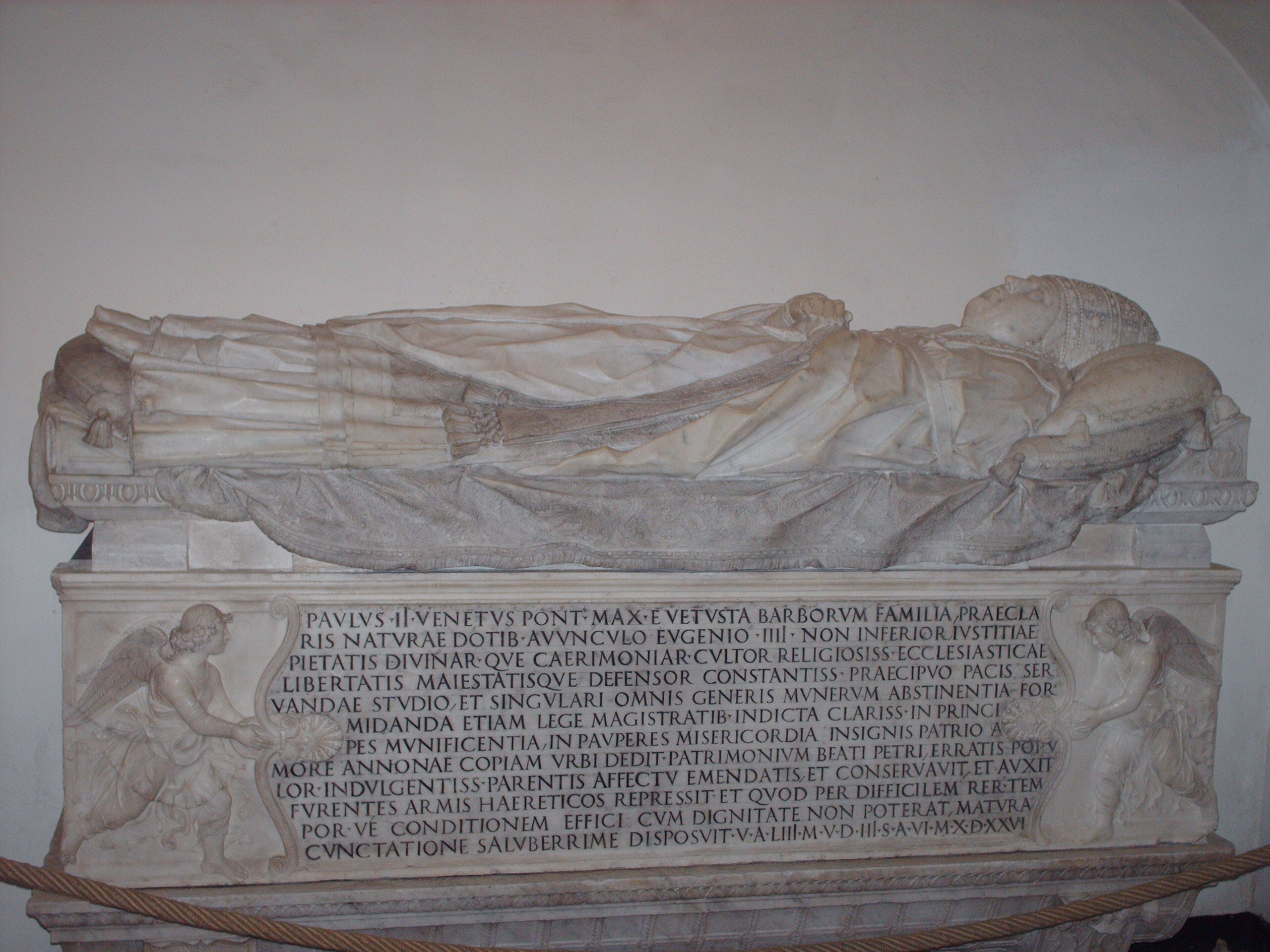
The sarcophagus of Pope Paul II

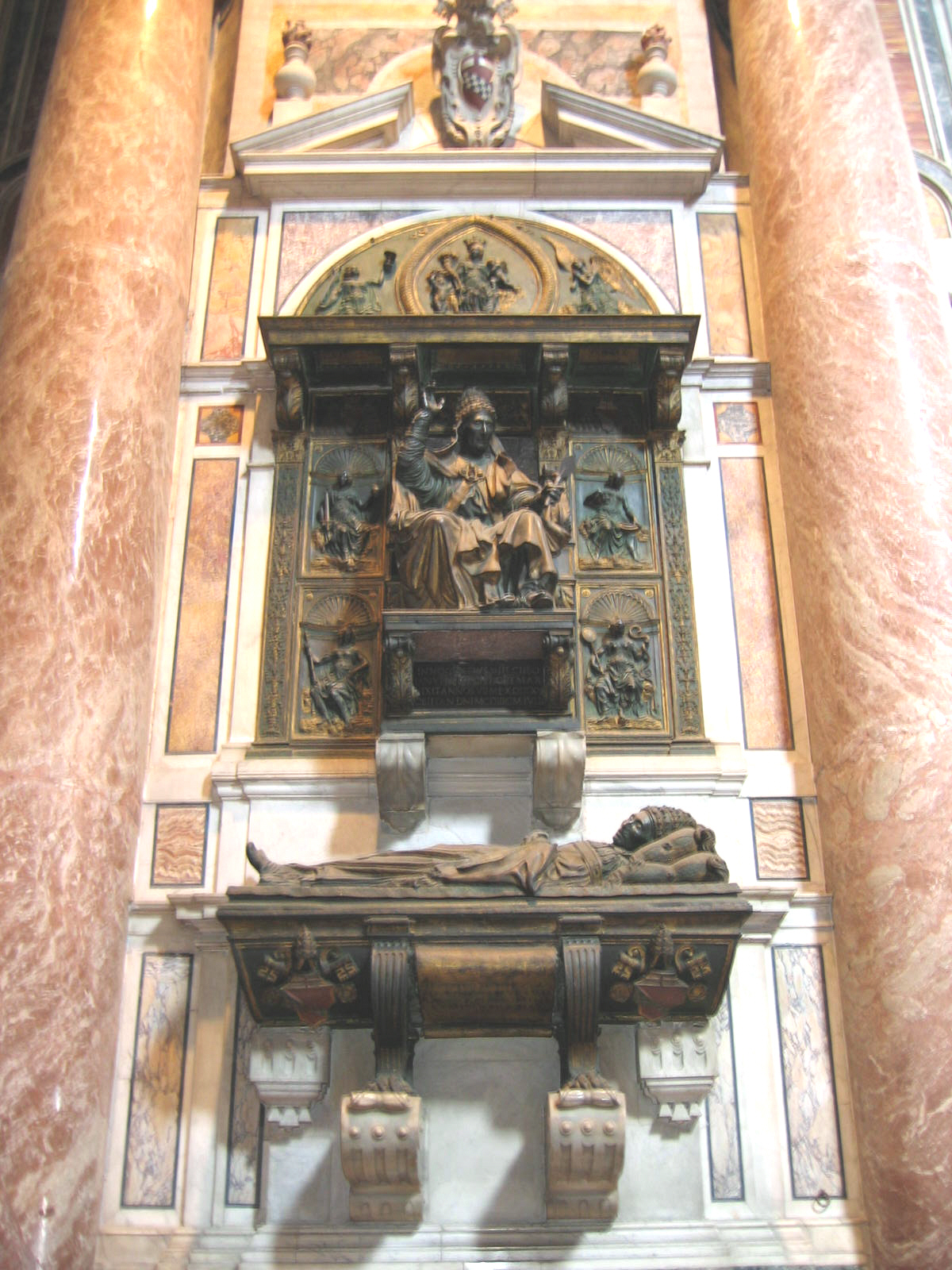
The tomb of Pope Innocent VIII was the first to depict a live pontiff.

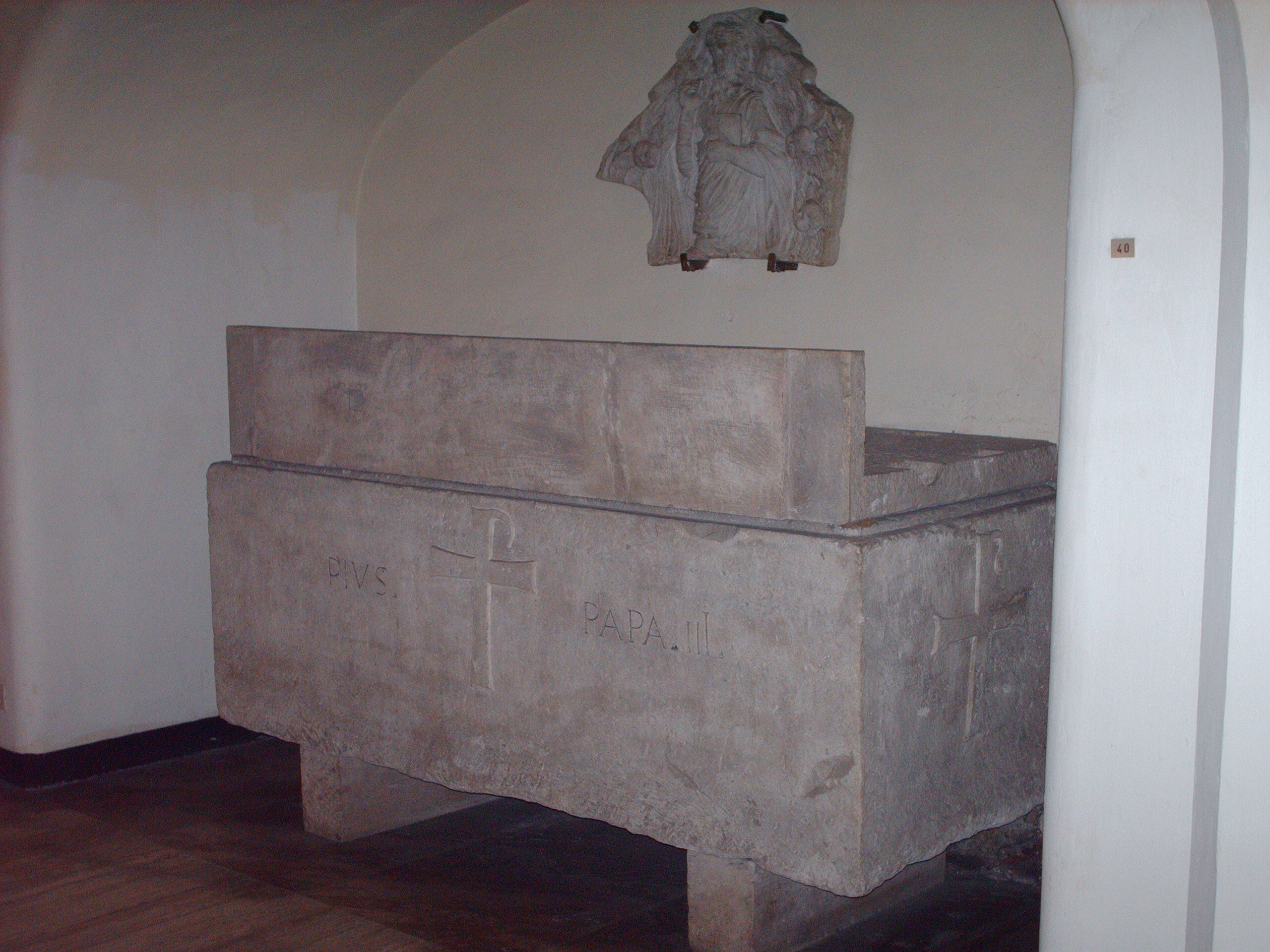
The tomb of Pope Pius III was translated to Sant'Andrea della Valle.

The tomb of Pope Paul III

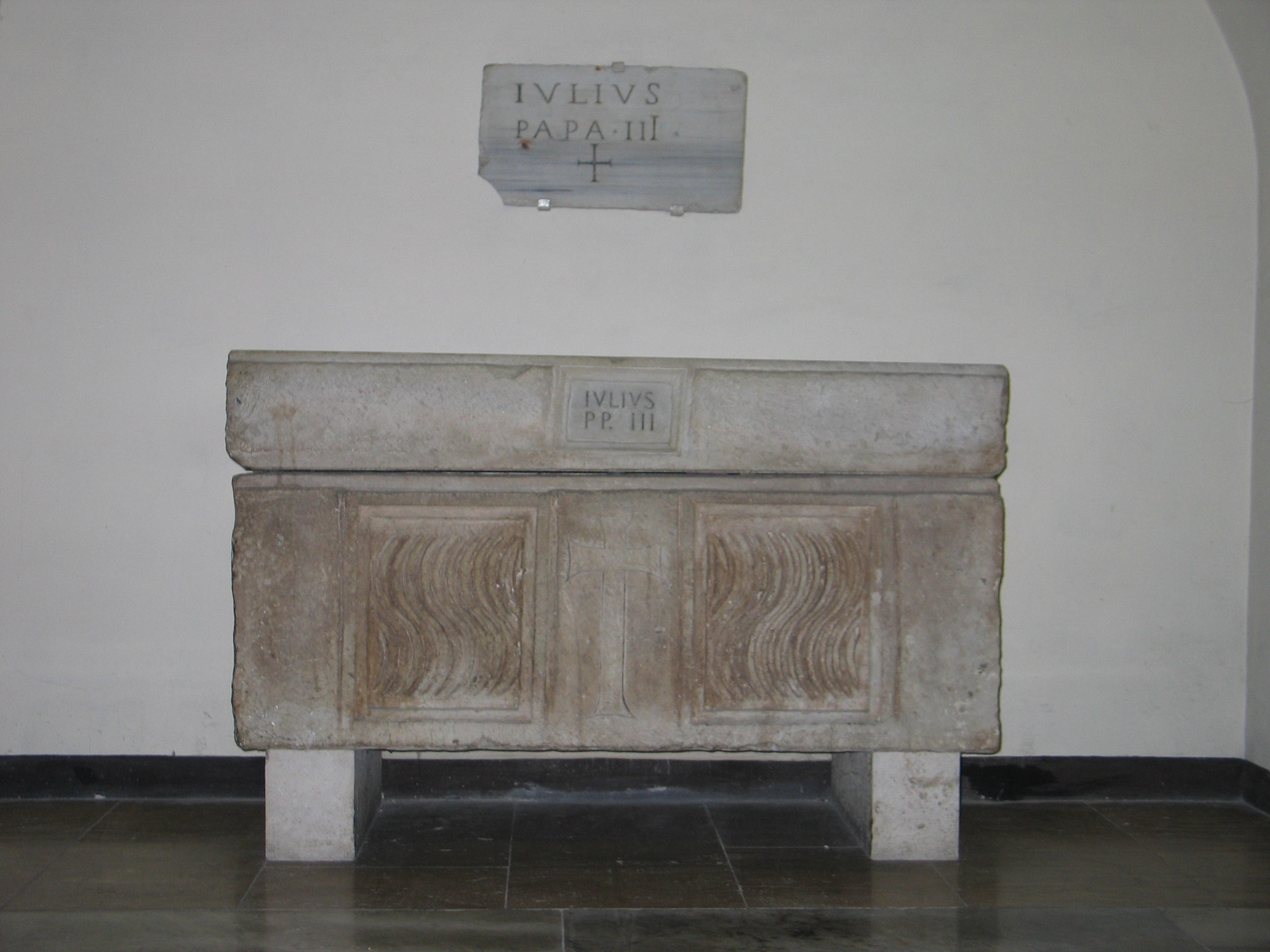
Pope Julius III was reinterred in an ancient sarcophagus.

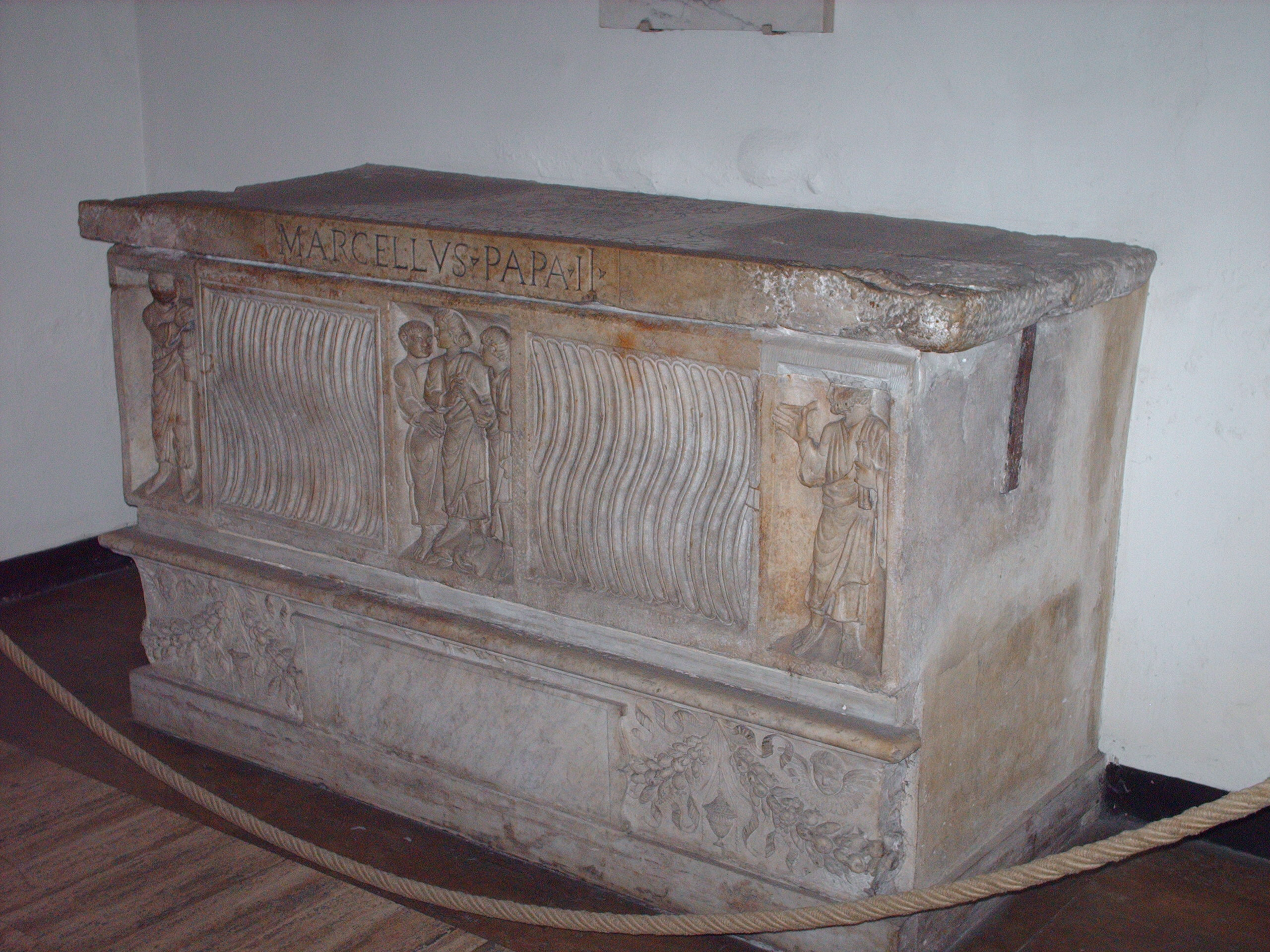
Pope Marcellus II reused a fourth-century sarcophagus.

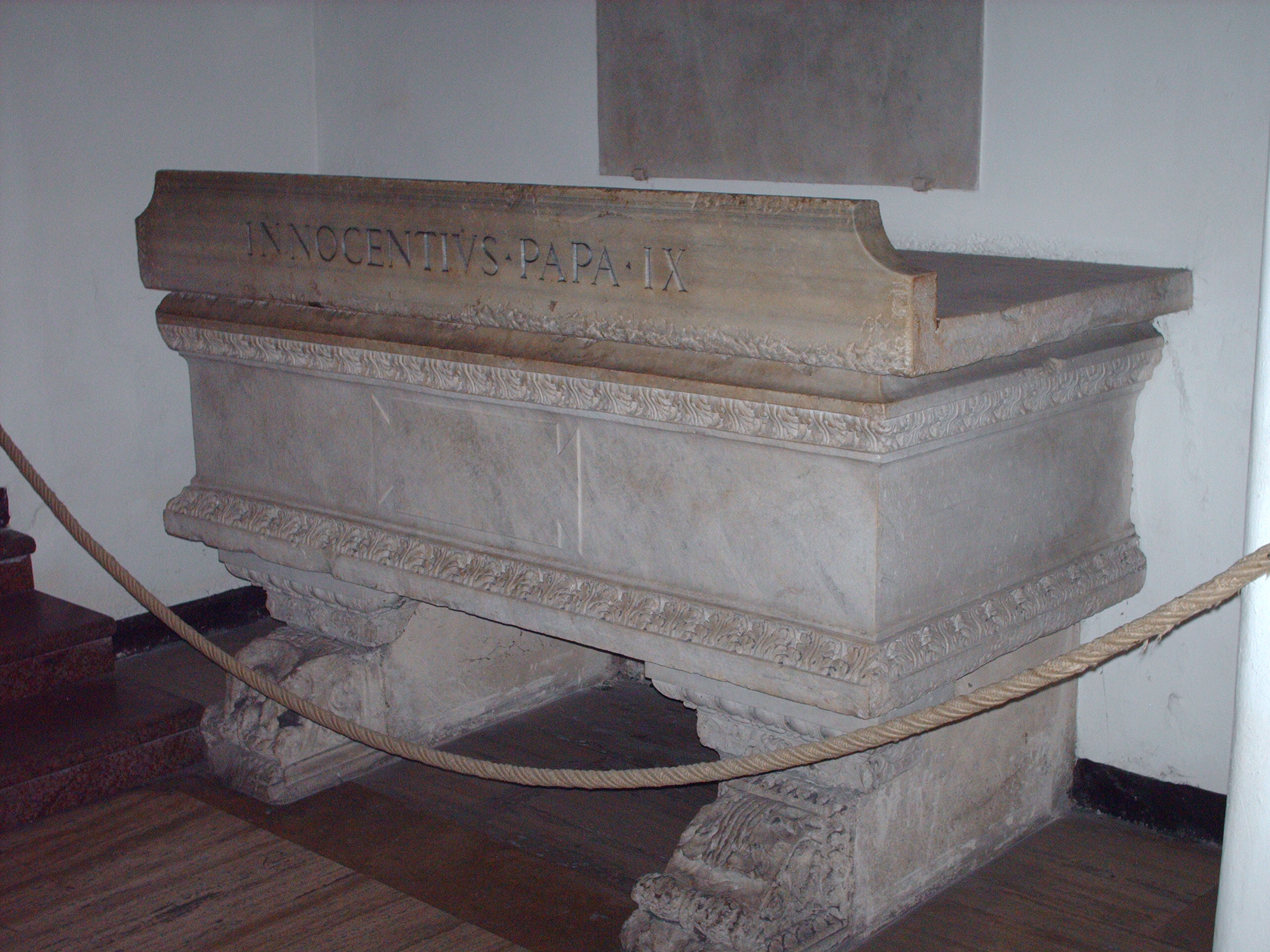
The tomb of Pope Innocent IX was the last installed in Old St. Peter's.

| Pontificate | Portrait | Common English name | Notes |
|---|---|---|---|
| 440–461 | | Leo I Saint Leo; Leo the Great | Tomb located in portico. First pope buried on the porch of Old Saint Peter's Basilica; translated multiple times, combined with Leos II, III, and IV circa 855; removed in the seventeenth century and placed under his own altar, below Algardi's relief, Fuga d'Attila (pictured) in the Chapel of the Madonna of Partorienti. |
| 468–483 | | Simplicius; Saint Simplicius | Tomb located in portico, near tomb of Leo I. Destroyed during the demolition. |
| 492–496 | | Gelasius I Saint Gelasius | Tomb located in portico |
| 496–498 | | Anastasius II | Tomb located in atrium. Destroyed during the demolition. |
| 498–514 | | Symmachus; Saint Symmachus | Tomb located in portico. Destroyed during the demolition. |
| 514–523 | | Hormisdas; Saint Hormisdas | Destroyed during the demolition |
| 523–526 | | John I Saint John | Located in the nave. Destroyed during the demolition. |
| 526–530 | | Felix IV; Saint Felix | Located in the atrium. Destroyed during the demolition. |
| 530–532 | | Boniface II | Located in the portico. Destroyed during the demolition. |
| 533–535 | | John II | Destroyed during the demolition |
| 535–536 | | Agapetus I Agapitus; Saint Agapetus | Located in the atrium. Destroyed during the demolition. |
| 556–561 | | Pelagius I | Located in the atrium. Destroyed during the demolition. |
| 561–574 | | John III | Destroyed during the demolition |
| 575–579 | | Benedict I | Located in the vestibule of the sacristy. Destroyed during the demolition. |
| 579–590 | | Pelagius II | Located in the atrium. Destroyed during the demolition. |
| 590–604 | | Gregory I, O.S.B. Saint Gregory; Gregory the Great | Located in the portico. Originally buried in the portico of Old St. Peter's, partly transferred to Soissous; during the demolition of St. Peter's, transferred to Sant'Andrea della Valle then Cappella Clementina, near the entrance of the modern St. Peter's. |
| 604–606 | | Sabinian; Saint Sabinian | Original monument in the atrium of Old Saint Peter's destroyed during the demolition; small fragment of the original epitaph remains in the crypt of St. Peter's Basilica |
| 607-607 | | Boniface III | Destroyed during the demolition |
| 608–615 | | Boniface IV, O.S.B. Saint Boniface | Originally buried in the portico of Old Saint Peter's; translated to the interior; one arm translated to Santa Maria in Cosmedin; other relics translated to the Chapel of St. Sylvester beside the Church of the Quattro Coronati; remainder translated to another chapel of St. Peter's; oratory which once contained the tomb is extant, as well as a sketch of the tomb by Ciampini |
| 615–618 | | Adeodatus I | |
| 619–625 | | Boniface V | Destroyed during the demolition |
| 625–638 | | Honorius I | Destroyed during the demolition |
| 638–640 | | Severinus | Located in the porch. Destroyed during the demolition. |
| 640–642 | | John IV | Destroyed during the demolition |
| 642–649 | | Theodore I | Located in the atrium. Destroyed during the demolition. |
| 654–657 | | Eugene I Saint Eugene | Destroyed during the demolition |
| 657–672 | | Vitalian; Saint Vitalian | Destroyed during the demolition |
| 672–676 | | Adeodatus II, O.S.B. | Destroyed during the demolition |
| 676–678 | | Donus | Destroyed during the demolition |
| 678–681 | | Agatho; Saint Agatho | Destroyed during the demolition |
| 681–683 | | Leo II; Saint Leo | Originally buried in Old Saint Peter's; translated under the altar of the Chapel of the Madonna della Colonna; combined with Leo I in the early seventeenth century; for centuries believed to be under the altar of the Church of San Stefano in Ferrara; combined remains of Leo's I, II, and IV in Chapel of the Madonna of Partorienti when found during the demolition |
| 684–685 | | Benedict II; Saint Benedict | Destroyed during the demolition |
| 685–686 | | John V | Located in the atrium. Destroyed in a Saracen raid in 846. |
| 686–687 | | Conon | Located in the left nave. Destroyed during the demolition. |
| 687–701 | | Sergius I Saint Sergius | First pope buried in Saint Peter's proper (not a portico); tomb destroyed during the demolition |
| 701–705 | | John VI | Destroyed during the demolition |
| 705–707 | | John VII | Located in the Chapel of the Blessed Virgin Mary. Destroyed during the demolition; surviving mosaic of John VII in the Vatican grottoes believed to be part of his original tomb |
| 708-708 | | Sisinnius | Located in the left nave. Destroyed during the demolition. |
| 708–715 | | Constantine | Located in the left nave. Destroyed during the demolition. |
| 715–731 | | Gregory II; Saint Gregory | Located in the atrium. Destroyed during the demolition. |
| 731–741 | | Gregory III | Located in the Oratory of Our Lady. Destroyed during the demolition. |
| 741–752 | | Zachary; Saint Zachary | Destroyed during the demolition |
| Never took office as Pope | | Pope-elect Stephen | Located in the atrium. Destroyed during the demolition. |
| 752–757 | | Stephen II | Located in the atrium. Destroyed during the demolition. |
| 757–767 | | Paul I Saint Paul | Located in the Oratory of Our Lady. Temporarily buried in San Paolo fuori le Mura; moved to the Oratory of Our Lady in Old Saint Peter's; destroyed during the demolition. |
| 767–772 | | Stephen III | Located in the atrium. Destroyed during the demolition |
| 772–795 | | Adrian I | Original monument in the Oratory of Cathedra Petri destroyed during the demolition; inscription, composed by Charlemagne, remains in the portico of modern St. Peter's |
| 795–816 | | Leo III; Saint Leo | Located in the Chapel of the Madonna of Partorienti. Originally buried in Old Saint Peter's (above); combined with Leo II and IV by Pope Paschal II; combined sarcophagus destroyed during the demolition; combined with Leo I in 1601 and placed in a sarcophagus under the altar of our Savior della Colonna in new Saint Peter's (below) |
| 816–817 | | Stephen IV | Destroyed during the demolition |
| 824–827 | | Eugene II | Destroyed during the demolition |
| 827–827 | | Valentine | Destroyed during the demolition |
| 827–844 | | Gregory IV | Destroyed during the demolition |
| 844–847 | | Sergius II | Located in the Altar of the chapel of Saints Sixtus and Fabian. Destroyed during the demolition. |
| 847–855 | | Leo IV, O.S.B. Saint Leo | Located under the altar of Our Savior della Colonna. Combined with Leos I, II, and III. |
| 855–858 | | Benedict III | Located in the Narthex. Destroyed during the demolition. |
| 858–867 | | Nicholas I Saint Nicholas; Nicholas the Great | Originally buried in the atrium of Old Saint Peter's; epitaph partially preserved during the demolition, extant in the Vatican grottoes |
| 867–872 | | Adrian II | Originally buried in Old Saint Peter's; epitaph partially preserved during the demolition, still visible in the Vatican grottoes |
| 872–882 | | John VIII | Located in the portico or nave. Destroyed during the demolition. |
| 882–884 | | Marinus I | Located in the portico. Destroyed during the demolition. |
| 885–891 | | Stephen V | Located in the portico. Destroyed during the demolition. |
| 891–896 | | Formosus | Originally buried in old Saint Peter's; exhumed, defrocked, defingered, and thrown in the Tiber River (see: Cadaver Synod); reinterred in Old Saint Peter's; destroyed during the demolition |
| 896-896 | | Boniface VI | Located in the portico. Destroyed during the demolition. |
| 896–897 | | Stephen VI | Located in the portico. Destroyed during the demolition. |
| 897–897 | | Romanus | Destroyed during the demolition |
| 897 | | Theodore II | Destroyed during the demolition |
| 898–900 | | John IX, O.S.B. | Located in the portico, left nave, or just outside. Destroyed during the demolition. |
| 900–903 | | Benedict IV | Located near the gate of Guido. Destroyed during the demolition. |
| 904–911 | | Sergius III | Destroyed during the demolition |
| 911–913 | | Anastasius III | Located in the atrium. Destroyed during the demolition. |
| 913–914 | | Lando | Destroyed during the demolition |
| 928–928 | | Leo VI | Destroyed during the demolition |
| 928–931 | | Stephen VII | Destroyed during the demolition |
| 931–935 | | John XI | Destroyed during the demolition |
| 936–939 | | Leo VII, O.S.B. | Destroyed during the demolition |
| 939–942 | | Stephen VIII | Destroyed during the demolition |
| 942–946 | | Marinus II | Destroyed during the demolition |
| 964–965 | | Leo VIII | Destroyed during the demolition |
| 973–974 | | Benedict VI | Destroyed during the demolition |
| 983–984 | | John XIV | Destroyed during the demolition |
| 985–996 | | John XV | Located in the Oratory of St. Mary. Destroyed during the demolition. |
| 996–999 | | Gregory V | Tomb discovered on August 14, 1607, under the pavement of St. Peter's; exhumed and reburied on January 15, 1609, in a fourth/fifth century sarcophagus |
| 1012–1024 | | Benedict VIII | Destroyed during the demolition |
| 1024–1032 | | John XIX | Destroyed during the demolition |
| 1045–1046 | | Gregory VI | Destroyed during the demolition |
| 1049–1054 | | Leo IX; Saint Leo | Originally buried in the east wall of Old Saint Peter's, close to the altar of Gregory I; coffin opened on January 11, 1606, during the demolition and parts were taken as relics; remainder reburied under the altar of Saints Marziale and Valeria, now dedicated to the stigmata of St. Francis of Assisi |
| 1088–1099 | | Urban II, O.S.B. Blessed Urban | First tomb destroyed during the demolition |
| 1145–1153 | | Eugene III, O.Cist. Blessed Eugene | Destroyed during the demolition |
| 1154–1159 | | Adrian IV, O.S.A. | Reused an Early Christian sarcophagus |
| 1227–1241 | | Gregory IX | Destroyed during the demolition |
| 1241–1241 | | Celestine IV | Destroyed during the demolition |
| 1277–1280 | | Nicholas III | Original destroyed during the demolition; combined with two Rainaldo Orsinis in 1620 |
| 1294–1303 | | Boniface VIII | Original tomb chapel, into which Boniface VIII had moved the relics of Boniface IV, destroyed during the demolition |
| 1378–1389 | | Urban VI | Saved during the deconstruction of Old Saint Peter's; nearly dumped by workmen for use as a water trough |
| 1389–1404 | | Boniface IX | Located in the Chapel of Saints Peter and Paul. Tomb by Giovanni Tomacelli among the first destroyed during the demolition. |
| 1404–1406 | | Innocent VII | Originally buried in the Chapel of Saints Peter and Paul, moved to the Chapel of St. Thomas in 1455, moved into a mid-fifteenth century copy of the original sarcophagus on September 12, 1606 |
| 1447–1455 | | Nicholas V | Moved from the left outer aisle of Old Saint Peter's to the right outer aisle. Still monument by Mino da Fiesole, but not sarcophagus, destroyed during the demolition. |
| 1464–1471 | | Paul II | Effigy by Giovanni Dalmata; figures and bas-reliefs by Mino da Fiesole. Monument moved in 1544 and torn down in seventeenth century; sarcophagus survived demolition. |
| 1471–1484 | | Sixtus IV, O.F.M. | Sculpted by Antonio del Pollaiuolo. Originally located in the choir chapel of Old Saint Peter's; moved in 1610 to the sacristy; moved in 1625 to the Chapel del Coro in new Saint Peter's; combined with Julius II in 1926; moved again in 1940s. |
| 1484–1492 | | Innocent VIII | Sculpted by Antonio del Pollaiuolo. First papal tomb to depict a live pope rather than a deathbed effigy; originally placed in the Oratory of Our Lady in Old St. Peter's. |
| 1503–1503 | | Pius III | Sculpted by Sebastiano Ferrucci. Originally built in Old Saint Peter's; last papal mausoleum erected in Old St. Peter's; moved to Sant'Andrea della Valle during the reign of Paul V. |
| 1523–1534 | | Clement VII | Originally buried in a brick tomb in Old Saint Peter's; current tomb is across from that of Leo X, another Medici pope in Santa Maria sopra Minerva |
| 1534–1549 | | Paul III | Sculpted by Guglielmo della Porta. Moved in 1599. |
| 1550–1555 | | Julius III | Originally buried in St. Peter's Basilica sans monument in a red stone sarcophagus in the chapel of San Andrea; reinterred in an ancient sarcophagus in 1608, which was reopened two years later during the demolition; sometimes cited as buried in the Del Monte chapel of San Pietro in Montorio along with his adopted cardinal-nephew, Innocenzo Ciocchi Del Monte |
| 1555–1555 | | Marcellus II | No monument; fourth century sarcophagus, bearing a traditio legis |
| 1572–1585 | | Gregory XIII | Original monument destroyed; new monument built in eighteenth century |
| 1590–1591 | | Gregory XIV | Sculpted by Prospero Antichi. |
| 1591–1591 | | Innocent IX | No monument |

== See also ==
- Index of Vatican City-related articles
- Papal tombs
- St. Peter's tomb
