= Vatican Grottoes =

Section of St. Peter's Basilica, Vatican City

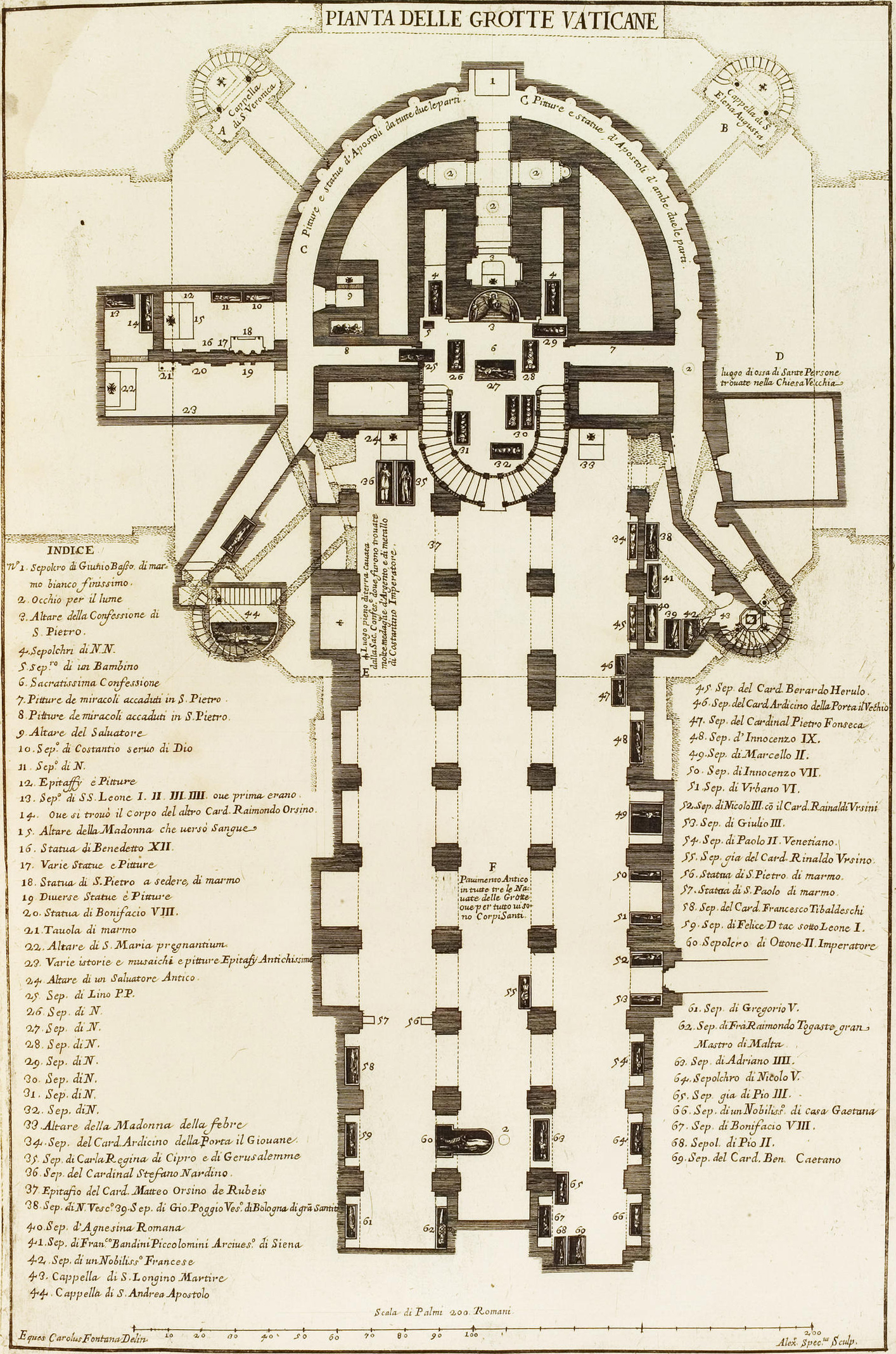
Plan of the Vatican Grottoes (1694)

The Vatican Grottoes are a series of underground chambers and chapels located under part of the nave of St. Peter's Basilica in the Vatican. They are situated three meters below the current floor, and extend from the high altar (the papal altar) to about halfway down the aisle, forming a true underground church that occupies the space between the current floor of the Basilica and that of the old Constantinian basilica of the 4th century.

The Vatican Grottoes are not to be confused with the Vatican Necropolis, which is an ancient burial ground that dates back to the Roman times and lies at a lower level beneath the Grottoes and the Basilica.

== History and development ==
=== Origins ===
The origins of the Vatican Grottoes date back to the 16th century, specifically around 1590–1591, when they were constructed to support the floor of the Renaissance-era St. Peter's Basilica. The initial concept was proposed by architect Antonio da Sangallo the Younger to Pope Leo X following Raphael's death in 1520.

Pope Clement VIII, in 1592, undertook significant renovations of the medieval crypt, naming it the "Clementine" and installing a seventeenth-century altar near the tomb of Saint Peter. Between 1616 and 1617, Pope Paul V added straight corridors leading to the Confessio of Saint Peter, along with several chapels such as the Chapel of the Salvatorello and the Chapel of the Madonna of Bocciata, adorned with hagiographic paintings by Giovanni Battista Ricci.

In the 17th century, under Pope Urban VIII, four small oratories were created at the base of the pillars supporting the dome, designed by Gian Lorenzo Bernini and decorated by artists like Agostino Ciampelli and Guidobaldi Abbatini.

Over the years, several popes have contributed to their expansion and embellishment.

=== Later additions and significance ===
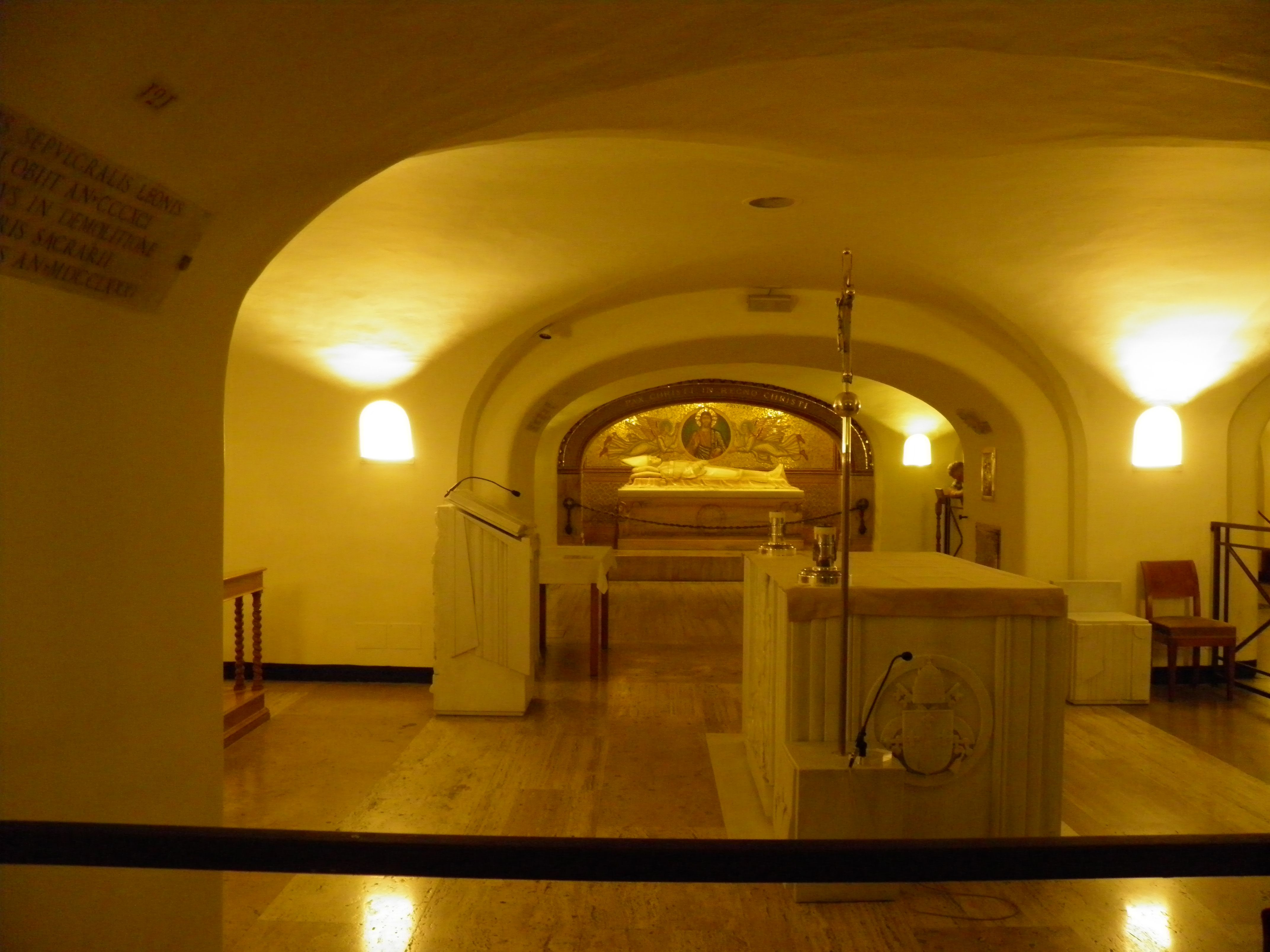
Chapel in the Grottoes

Post mid-20th century, several chapels were added around the tomb of Saint Peter, representing various nationalities and patron saints. Notable among these are the Irish, Polish, Lithuanian, Patron Saints of Europe, and Mexican chapels, and the oratory with the tomb of Pope Pius XII.

In 1979, a large archway was opened to make the front of the Confessio, with the Niche of the Pallia, visible. This area, closest to Saint Peter's tomb, is surrounded by chapels dedicated to Our Lady, forming a crown around the Apostle's tomb. The central space of the grottoes, encompassing the tombs of successive popes, resembles a lower basilica with three naves.

== Art and architecture ==
The Vatican Grottoes house frescoes, mosaics, sculptures, and inscriptions, many of which are relics from the older version of St. Peter's Basilica. The grottoes served as a memorial space, preserving the last images and elements of the ancient basilica.

== Burials ==
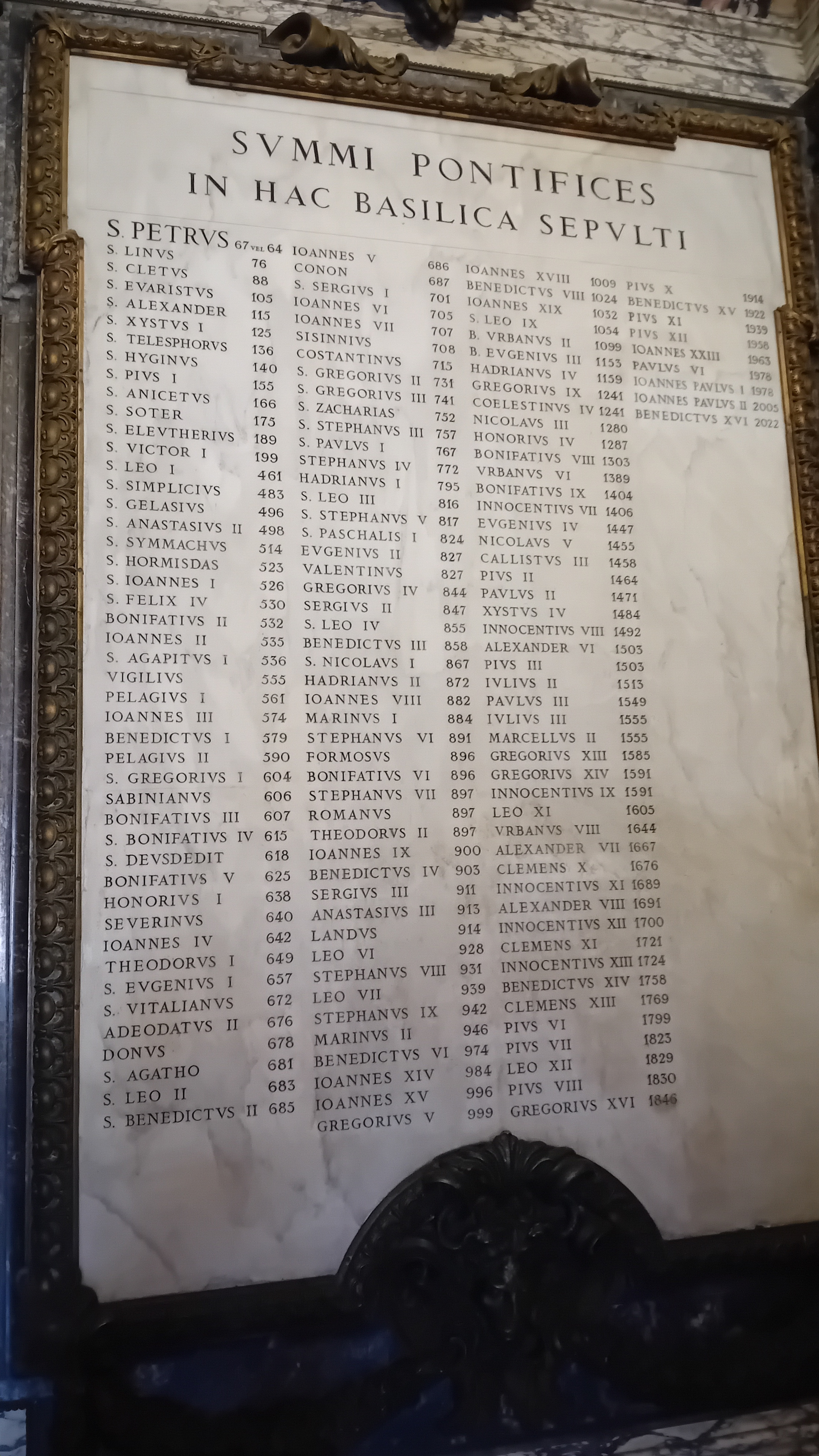
List of popes buried in St Peter's Basilica, as of 2023

The Grottoes contain the tombs of 91 popes. Notably, Pope John Paul II was initially buried here in 2005 before his remains were moved to the Altar of St. Sebastian. Additionally, it houses the graves of some royals, such as Queen Christina of Sweden and Queen Charlotte of Cyprus. Within the Clémentine Chapel, behind the altar, lies St. Peter's Tomb, marked by a grill covering some white marble.

== See also ==
- List of non-extant papal tombs
- List of extant papal tombs
- Index of Vatican City–related articles
- Saint Peter's tomb
