= Giacomo Grimaldi =

Italian historian and Vatican archivist

Giacomo Grimaldi (November 1568 – 7 January 1623) was an Italian historian and Vatican archivist, who lived in the early 17th century.

== Biography ==
His principal surviving works deal with the Catholic Church. Several papal tombs in old St. Peter's Basilica, that were destroyed during the rebuilding, are only known through illustrations by Grimaldi, who was the basilica’s notary. He is also notable for saving Pope Urban VI's remains from being discarded in 1606 and his sarcophagus used for a water trough.

Many of his drawings were copied and published by Giovanni Giustino Ciampini in his book "De sacris aedificiis a Constantino Magno constructis", published in 1693.

== Gallery ==
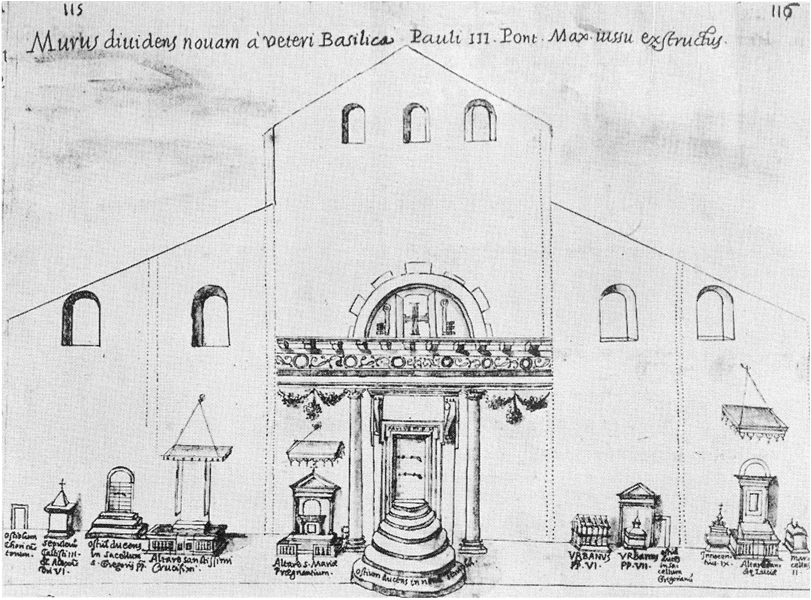
Sketch of the interior of St. Peter's during its reconstruction, showing the temporary placement of some of the papal tombs
