= Giovanni Ciampini =

Italian historian and archeologist (1633–1698)

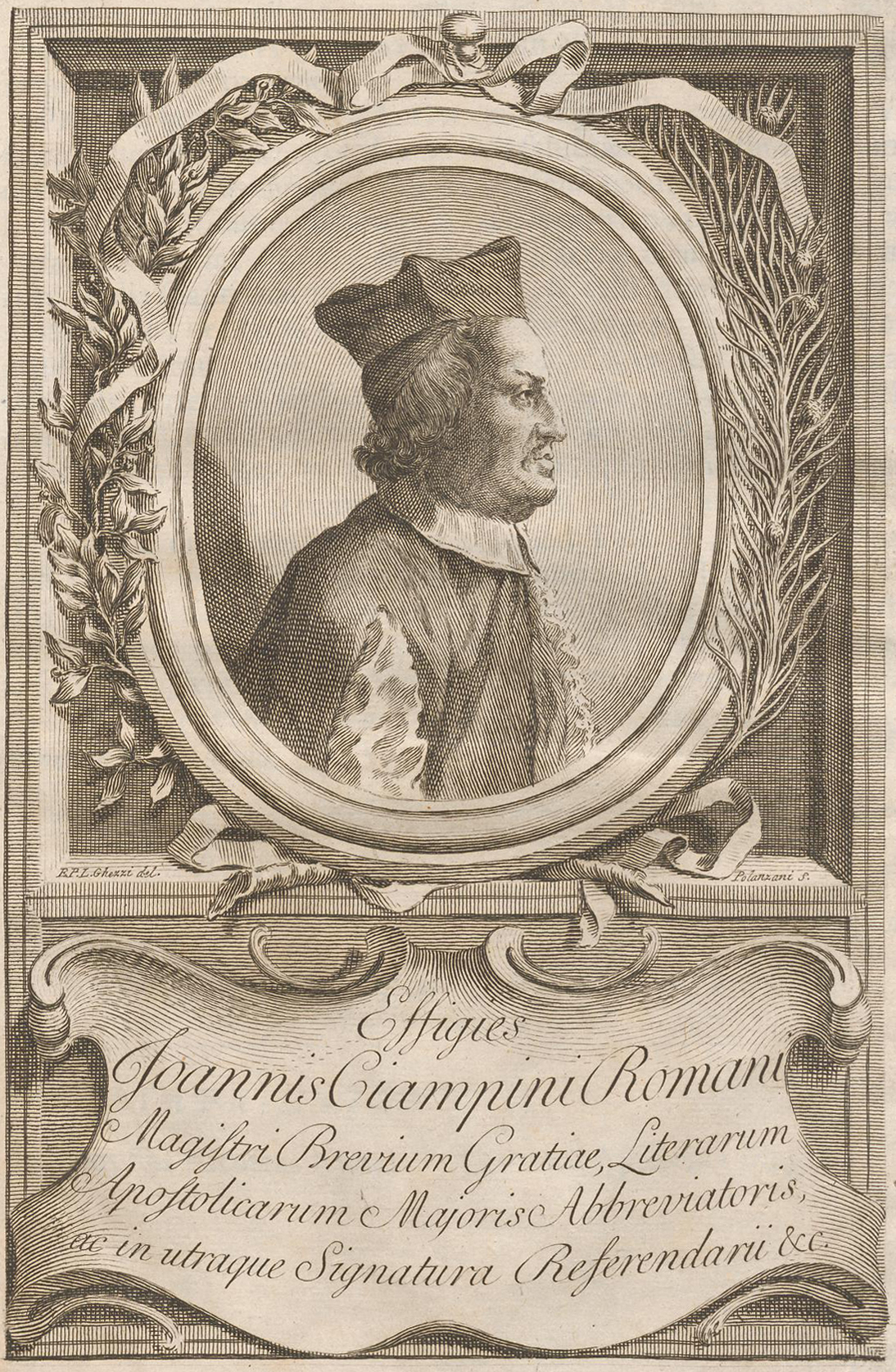
- Born: 13 April 1633; Rome, Papal States
- Died: 12 July 1698; Rome, Papal States
- Education: University of Macerata (LL.D., 1657)
- Occupations: Church historian, archaeologist, writer, historian, naturalist, prelate
- Parent(s): Antonio Ciampini and Margherita Ciampini (née Taglietti)

Signature
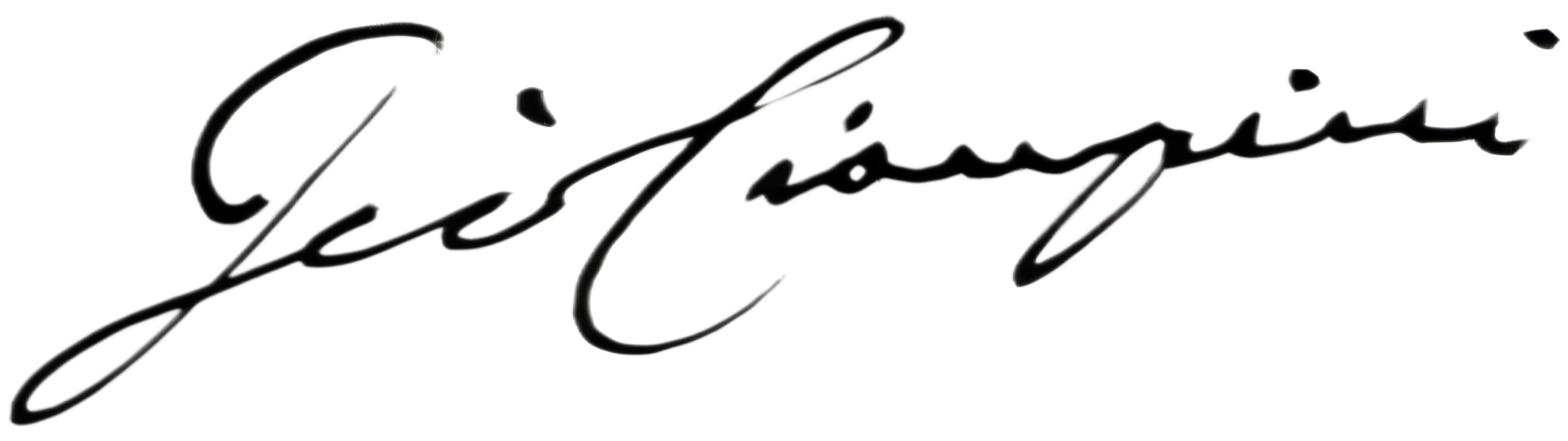

Giovanni Giustino Ciampini (born Rome, 1633 – died 1698 in Rome) was an ecclesiastical archaeologist.

== Biography ==
He graduated from the University of Macerata as a student of law but soon devoted himself to archaeological interests, which an important office (Magister brevium gratiæ) in the Apostolic Chancery permitted him to pursue. He devoted himself to the collection of books, coins, and statues, and to the creation of scientific circles for the development of antiquarian learning; thus he founded, in 1671, a society for ecclesiastical history and, in 1679, an academy of the sciences, the latter under the patronage of his friend, Queen Christina of Sweden.

He continued the school of archaeological research begun by Onofrio Panvinio and Antonio Bosio, and carried on a smaller scale by Fabretti, Boldetti, and Bottari, and later Alarchi and Giovanni Battista de Rossi. Apart from some minor archaeological studies (1693), he has left two illustrated works:

- "De sacris aedificiis a Constantino magno constructis", published in 1693 in Rome, is a history of the ancient churches East and West built by Emperor Constantine the Great
- "Vetera monimenta in quibus praecipua . . . musiva opera . . . illustrantur", published in two volumes in 1690–99 in Rome, is a history of the art of mosaics

Both works contain good illustrations of many ancient Christian edifices and mosaics that have since perished or suffered change and deterioration. Many of his drawings were copies or based on previous works, such as by Giacomo Grimaldi. His works were edited (Rome, 1747) in three volumes by Carlo Giannini.

== Gallery ==
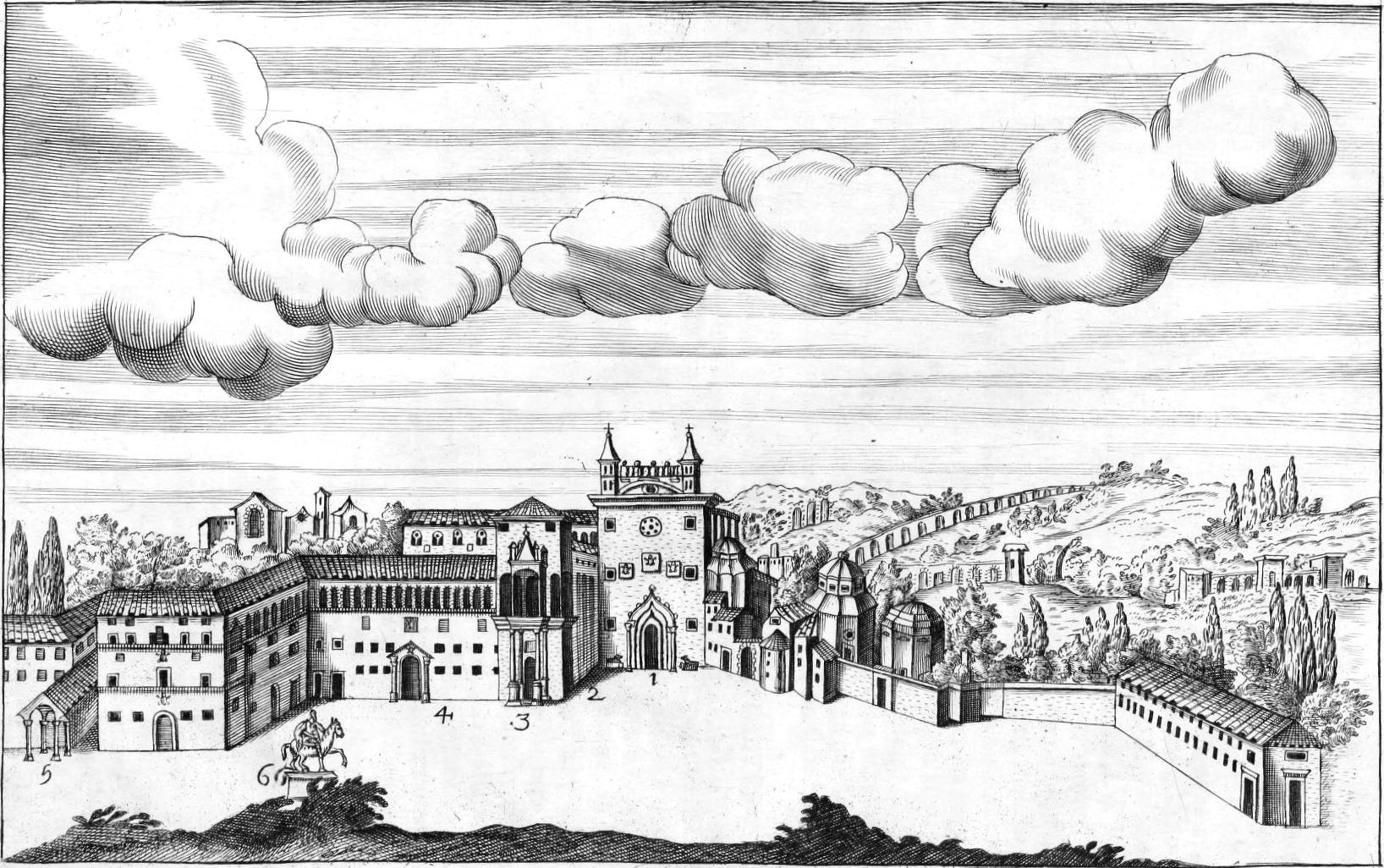
View of the Lateran, from "De sacris..." (1693)

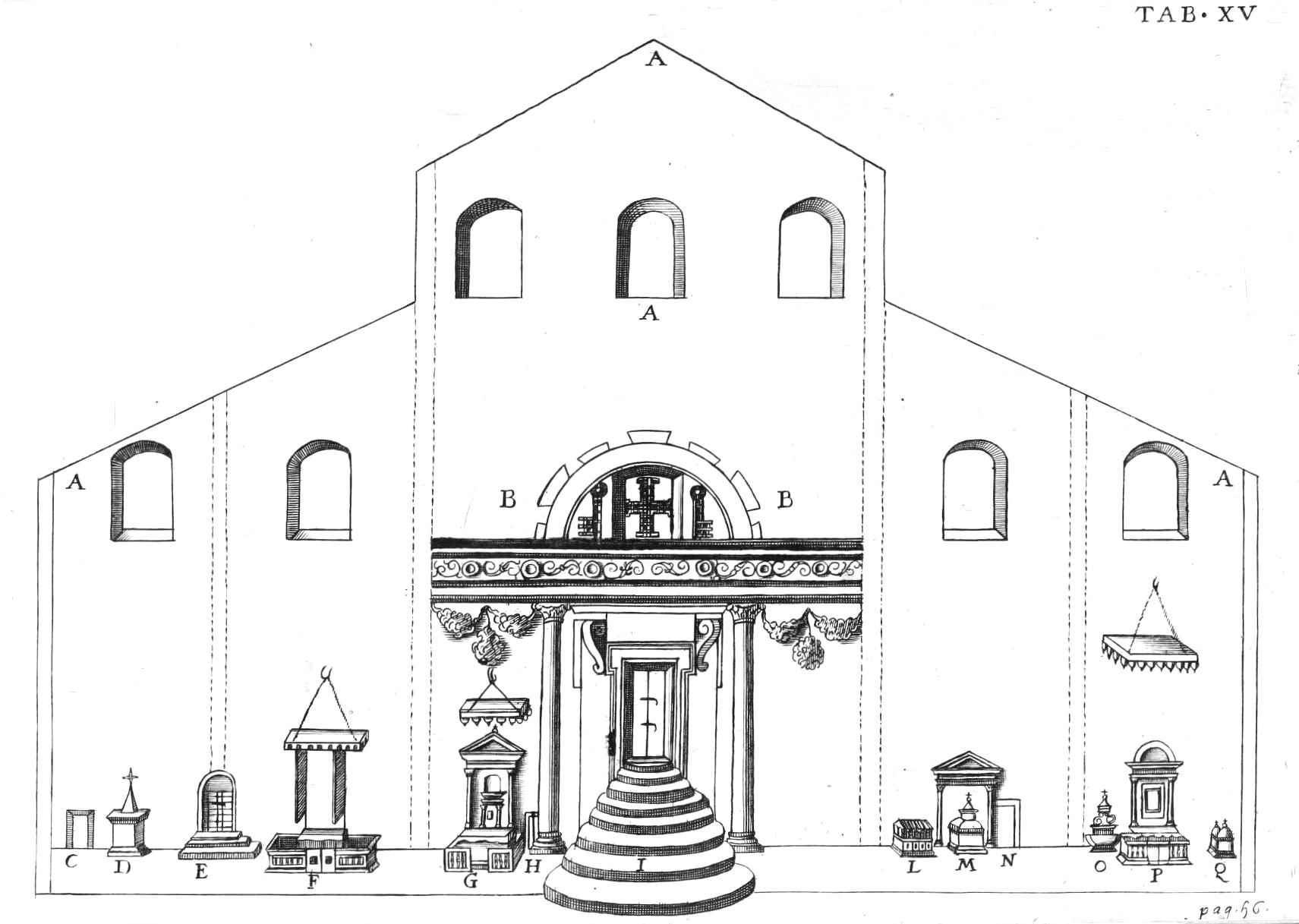
Interior of old St. Peter's Basilica, from "De sacris..." (1693)

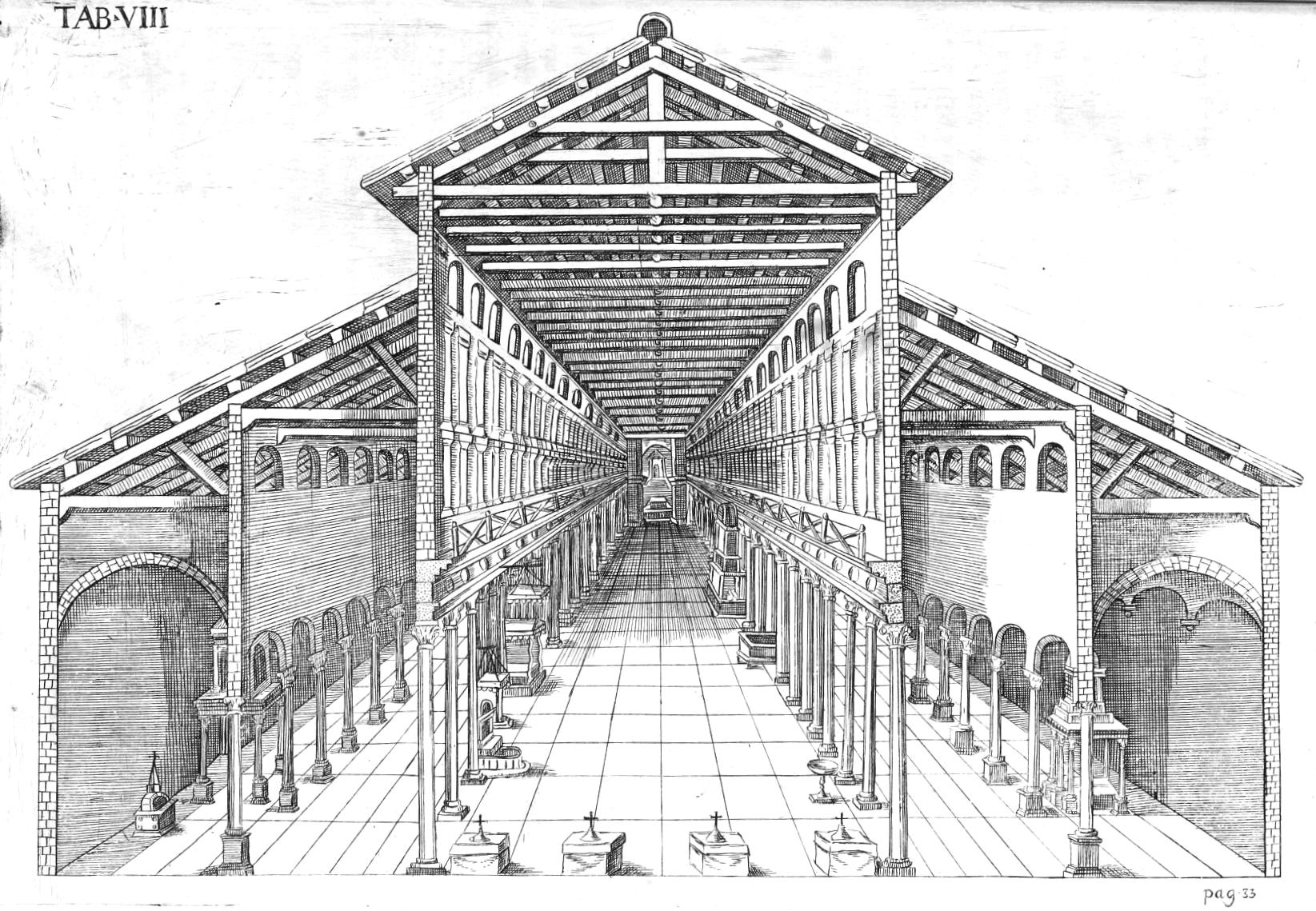
Interior of old St. Peter's Basilica, from "De sacris..." (1693)

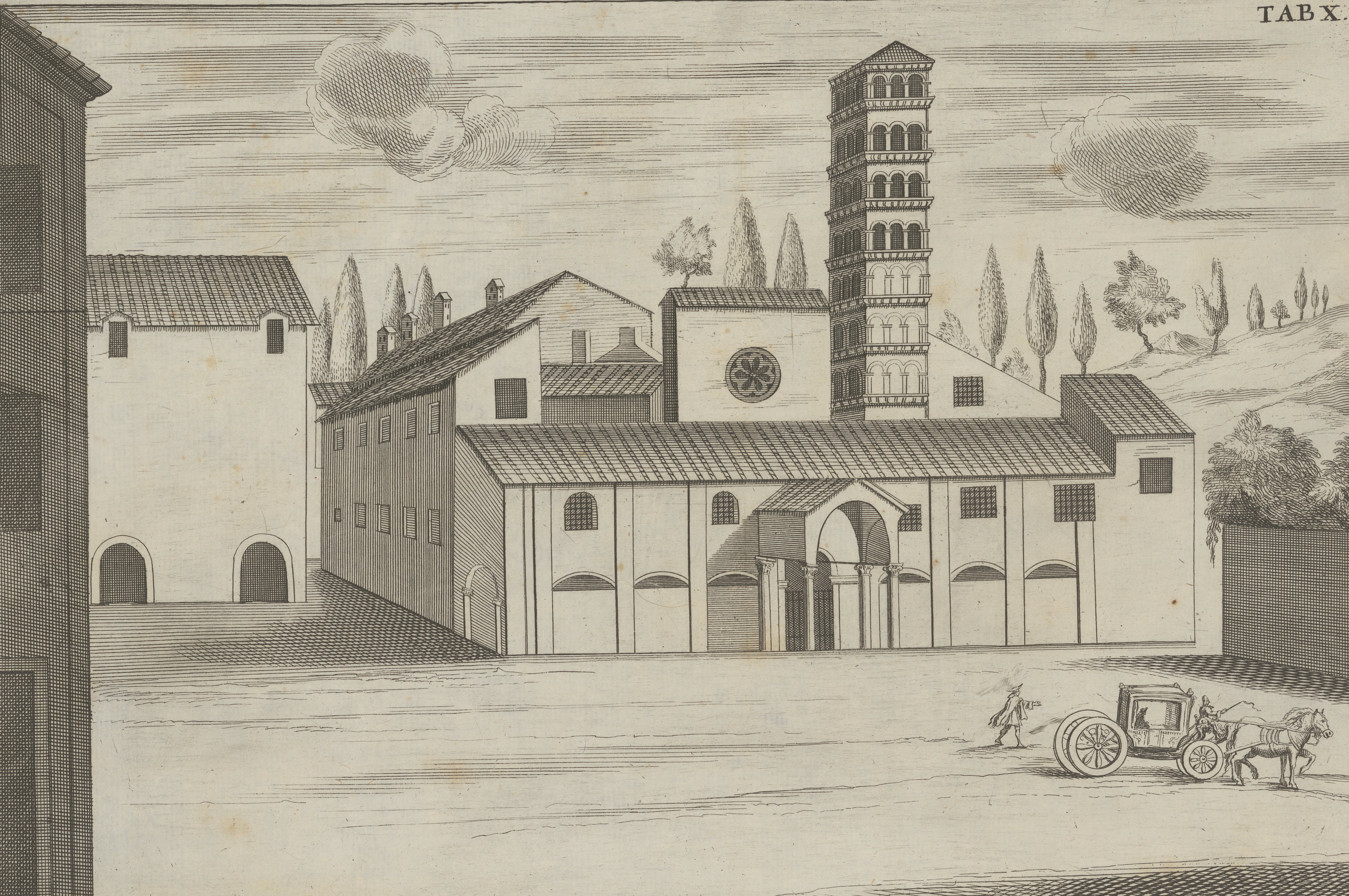
Façade of San Clemente, Rome in De Sacris... (1693)

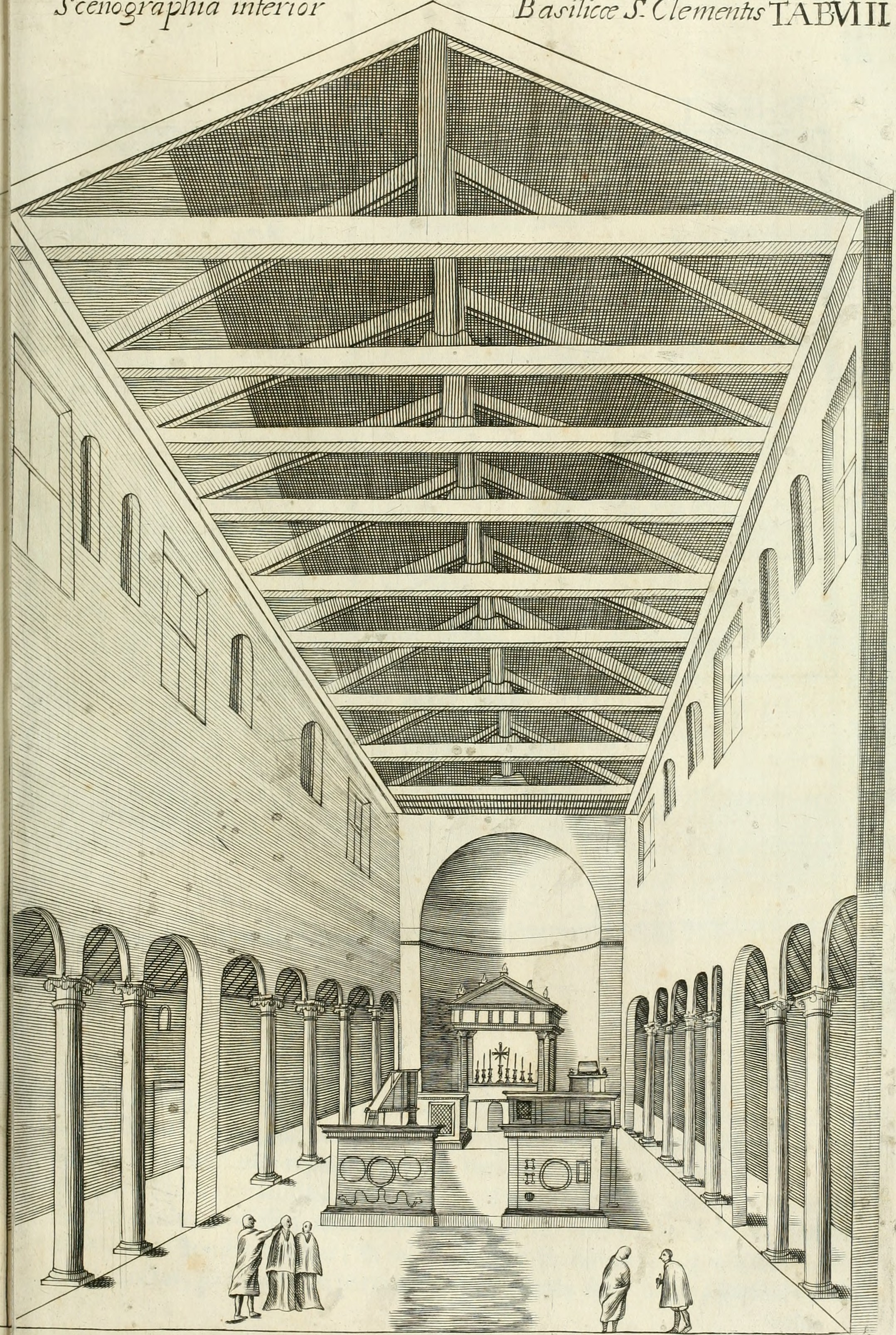
Interior of San Clemente in Vetera Monimenta (1690)
