= List of non-extant papal tombs =

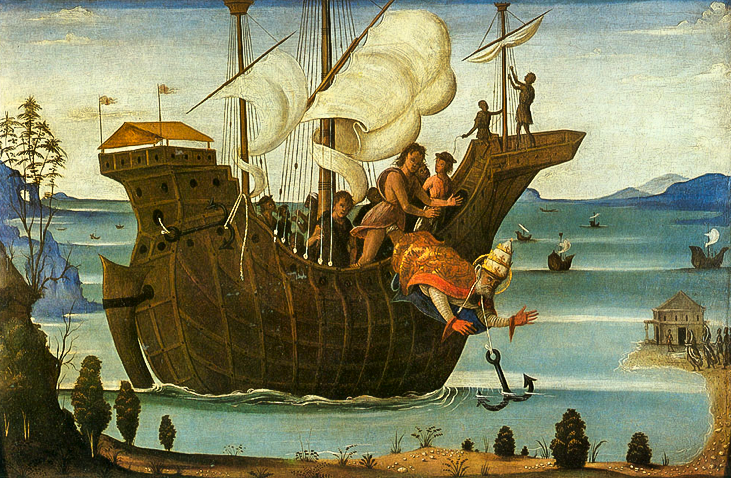
Despite his being regarded as martyred into the Black Sea, multiple churches have laid claims to the translated relics of Pope Clement I.

This is a list of non-extant papal tombs, which includes tombs not included on the list of extant papal tombs. Information about these tombs is generally incomplete and uncertain.

Chronologically, the main locations of destroyed or unknown papal tombs have been: the obscure tombs of the first two centuries of popes near Saint Peter, the repeated waves of translations from the Catacombs of Rome, the demolition of the papal tombs in Old St. Peter's Basilica, and the 1306 and 1361 fires in the Archbasilica of Saint John Lateran.

Papal tombs have also been destroyed by other instances of fire, remodeling, and war (most recently, World War II). Others are unknown due to creative or geographically remote methods of martyrdom, or—in the case of Pope Clement I—both. Burial in churches outside the Aurelian Walls of Rome (Italian: fuori le Mura)—in the basilicas of Paul or Lorenzo—have not generally survived.

== Main locations ==
The main locations of destroyed or lost papal tombs include:

- Saint Peter's tomb, around which the following popes were traditionally believed to have been buried: Linus, Anacletus, Evaristus. Telesphorus, Hyginus, Pius I, Anicetus (later transferred to the Catacomb of Callixtus), Victor I. Epigraphic evidence exists only for Linus, with the discovery of a burial slab marked "Linus" in 1615; however, the slab is broken such that it could have once read "Aquilinius" or "Anullinus".
- The Catacombs of Rome, specifically the Catacomb of Callixtus, the Catacomb of Priscilla (and San Silvestro in Capite, built over the catacomb), the Catacomb of Balbina, the Catacomb of Calepodius, the Catacomb of Pontian, and the Catacomb of Felicitas, which were emptied by repeated translations by the ninth century
- Papal tombs in Old St. Peter's Basilica, which once numbered over 100 papal tombs, nearly all of which were destroyed during the sixteenth/seventeenth century demolition
- Archbasilica of Saint John Lateran, where over a dozen tombs were destroyed in two fires (1308 and 1361)

== Other destroyed or unknown tombs ==
=== 1st century ===
Pontificate	Portrait	Common English name	Tomb	Sculptor	Location	Notes
88/92–97/101		Clement I Saint Clement			According to tradition, translated to the Church of the Tithes (Kyiv)	According to tradition thrown into the Black Sea near Crimea, translated to the Church of the Holy Apostles, then Basilica di San Clemente, then the Church of the Tithes.

=== 2nd century ===
Pontificate	Portrait	Common English name	Tomb	Sculptor	Location	Notes
105/107–115/116		Alexander I Saint Alexander			Competing claims (involving translation): Santa Sabina (Rome); San Pelino at Valva (Sulmona); Paeligni Basilica; Freising, Bavaria (Catholic Encyclopedia)	
115/116–125		Sixtus I Saint Sixtus			Competing claims (involving translation and a finger): Alatri Cathedral; Alife Cathedral; Abbey of St. Michael (Lorraine)	
174/175–189		Eleuterus; Saint Eleutherus			Competing claims: Near Peter, on Vatican Hill; San Giovanni della Pigna; Santa Susanna (American Church in Rome)	

=== 5th century ===
Pontificate	Portrait	Common English name	Tomb	Sculptor	Location	Notes
31 July 432–March/August 440		Sixtus III; Saint Sixtus			San Lorenzo fuori le Mura	Then called San Lorenzo al Verano; sarcophagus destroyed, possibly in 1943
19 November 461 – 29 February 468		Hilarius; Saint Hilarius			San Lorenzo fuori le Mura, crypt	Then called San Lorenzo al Verano; sarcophagus destroyed, possibly in 1943
13 March 483 – 1 March 492		Felix III; Saint Felix			Either San Paolo fuori le Mura or the crypt of Santissima Concenzione near Piazza Barberini	Then called San Lorenzo al Verano; sarcophagus destroyed, possibly in 1943

=== 6th century ===
Pontificate	Portrait	Common English name	Tomb	Sculptor	Location	Notes
1 June 536 – 11 November 537		Silverius; Saint Silverius			Palmaria	Non-contemporary shrine extant on Ponza Island
29 March 537 – 7 June 555		Vigilius			Either San Marcello on the Via Salaria (Oxford Dictionary of Popes) or San Silvestre over the Catacomb of Priscilla on the Via Salaria (Catholic Encyclopedia)	

=== 7th century ===
Pontificate	Portrait	Common English name	Tomb	Sculptor	Location	Notes
July 649 – 16 September 655		Martin I Saint Martin			Church of our Lady (Blachdernæ), near Chersonesus	Possibly buried in Archbasilica of St. John Lateran

=== 9th century ===
Pontificate	Portrait	Common English name	Tomb	Sculptor	Location	Notes
25 January 817 – 11 February 824		Paschal I Saint Paschal			Unknown, but likely destroyed	Alleged to have been buried in the chapel of St. Zeno of Santa Prassade (disproved by modern research); possibly buried under the altar of the oratory of Saints Processus and Martiniano and lost when the oratory was moved in 1548 or 1605.

=== 10th century ===
Pontificate	Portrait	Common English name	Tomb	Sculptor	Location	Notes
July 903 – September 903		Leo V			Unknown but destroyed	Either cremated and thrown in the Tiber, buried (and thus destroyed) in Old Saint Peter's, or buried whole in Archbasilica of Saint John Lateran
1 October 965 – 6 September 972		John XIII			Basilica of Saint Paul Outside the Walls	Destroyed

=== 11th century ===
Pontificate	Portrait	Common English name	Tomb	Sculptor	Location	Notes
June 1003 – December 1003		John XVII			Unknown but destroyed	Either San Paolo fuori le Mura, Archbasilica of Saint John Lateran or Santa Sabina
25 December 1003 – July 1009		John XVIII			Unknown but destroyed	Either San Paolo fuori le Mura or Archbasilica of Saint John Lateran
1032–1044		Benedict IX			Abbey of Grottaferrata	Discovered on March 4, 1739; destroyed during World War II
1045		Sylvester III			Unknown	
13 April 1055 – 28 July 1057		Victor II			Santa Maria Rotunda (Ravenna)	Destroyed; claimed reburied in San Reparata (Florence) unsupported by evidence
2 August 1057 – 29 March 1058		Stephen IX, O.S.B.			Santa Reparata (Florence)	Tomb discovered in 1357 during the laying of the foundation for the new Duomo
6 December 1058 – 27 July 1061		Nicholas II			Santa Reparata (Florence)	Possibly reburied in the outer left aisle of St. Peter's; no remains of tomb in either today
30 September 1061 – 21 April 1073		Alexander II			Unknown but lost	Either the Lateran Archbasilica or St. Peter's

=== 12th century ===
Pontificate	Portrait	Common English name	Tomb	Sculptor	Location	Notes
21 October 1187 – 17 December 1187		Gregory VIII, Can. Reg.			Pisa Cathedral, Chapel of Our Lady	Destroyed in the fire of 1600; ordered the desecration of the tomb of Antipope Victor IV in Lucca on his way to Pisa, where he died

=== 13th century ===
Pontificate	Portrait	Common English name	Tomb	Sculptor	Location	Notes
18 July 1216 – 18 March 1227		Honorius III			Basilica di Santa Maria Maggiore	No longer extant
12 December 1254 – 25 May 1261		Alexander IV			Viterbo Cathedral	Destroyed in 1490; no longer extant
