= Gabriele Sforza =

Archbishop of Milan (1423-1457)

- Archbishop of Milan
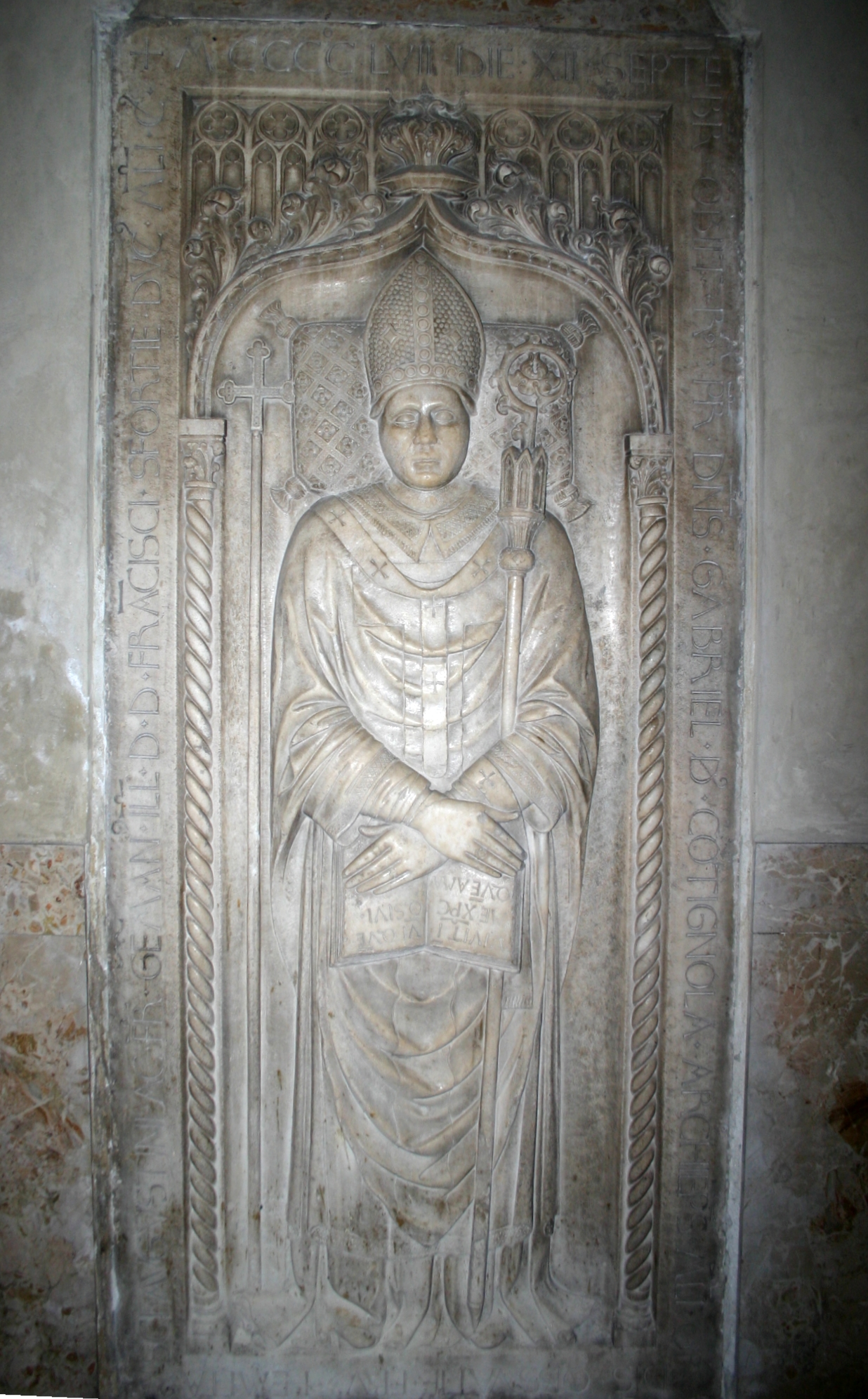
- Gravestone for the Archbishop of Milan, Gabriele Sforza in the Santa Maria Incoronata, Milan
- Church: Catholic Church
- See: Milan
- Appointed: 20 June 1454
- Term ended: 12 September 1457
- Predecessor: Timoteo Maffei
- Successor: Carlo da Forlì

Orders
- Consecration: 28 July 1454 (Bishop) by Giovanni Castiglione

Personal details
- Born: Carlo Sforza; 15 June 1423
- Died: 12 September 1457 (aged 34) Milan
- Buried: Santa Maria Incoronata, Milan

Gabriele Sforza (born Carlo Sforza; 1423–1457), was a member of the Augustinian Order who served as Archbishop of Milan from 1445 to his death in 1457.

== Family ==
His father was Giacomo Muzio Attendolo, who had three marriages and sixteen children: one child with his first wife Antonia Salimbeni, three children with his second wife Caterina Alopo; two children (including Carlo) with his third wife Maria Marzani countess of Celano; and ten children with his mistresses Tamira di Cagli and Lucia Terzani da Marsciano. Muzio Attendolo earned the nickname Sforza ("Strong") on the battlefield, which became the family surname under his son Francesco I Sforza, who was the Duke of Milan from 1450 to 1466. Francesco I Sforza had as sibling Carlo, who took the religious name of Gabriele.

== Biography ==
Carlo was born on 15 June 1423, in San Giorgio La Molara. Some sources give his mother as Maria Marzani, while others suggest he was the result of one of his father's extramarital affairs. The name Carlo was given to the child at the baptismal font to please Queen Giovanna II of Naples, in memory of her father Charles III of Anjou-Durres.

He spent the early part of his life serving in the military, but soon grew tired of the profession of arms. On 18 January 1442 he entered the Augustinian Monastery of San Salvatore di Selva di Lago, also known as the Monastery of the Holy Saviour at Lecceto, located outside Siena. He received the sacrament of Holy orders and took the name Gabriele di Cotignola or Gabriele Sforza as he is now known. At the monastery he dedicated himself to his studies and wrote various religious epistles, orations, moral treatises, essays on the gospels and four books on Scholastic Theology. His achievements did not go unnoticed, and he was soon appointed to serve as a religious teacher at the Monastery.

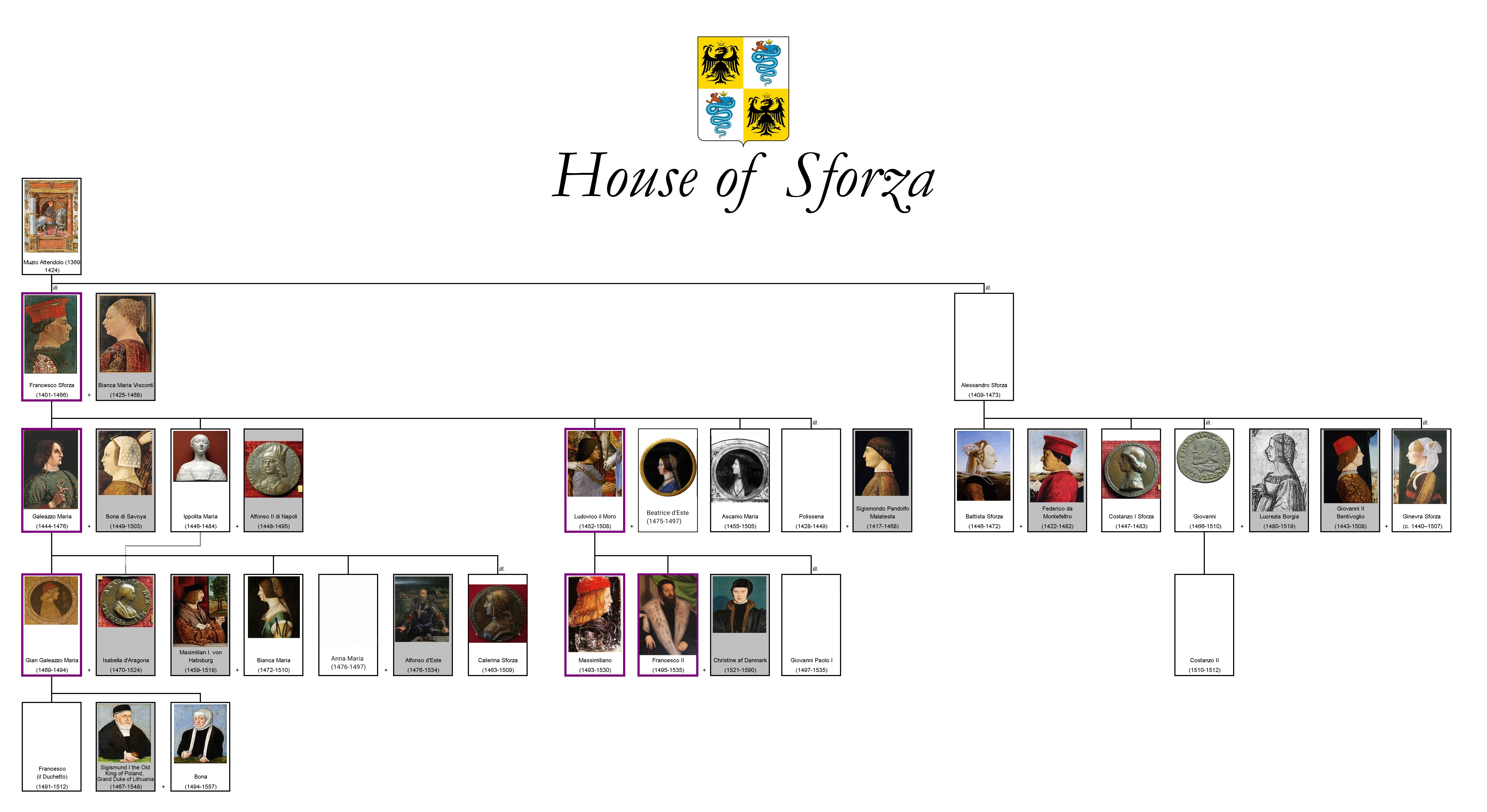
Family Tree of the House of Sforza

His brother Francesco later obtained for him by Pope Nicholas V the appointment, on 20 June 1545, as Archbishop of Milan. Gabriele accepted unwillingly, and was consecrated bishop in the church of Santa Maria Incoronata on 28 July 1454 by Giovanni Castiglione bishop of Pavia.

In 1456 the Archbishop began paying pastoral visits to the parishes of the Archdiocese of Milan. In order to respond to the needs of his people, he urged his brother Francesco to build the Ospedale Maggiore, one of the first community hospitals in Europe.

In April 1457 Sforza made a pilgrimage to Loreto, and fell ill on the way back, Gabriele Sforza died on the night between Sunday 11 and Monday 12 September 1457 in his apartment at Santa Maria in Brera in Milan. He was buried in the church of Santa Maria Incoronata, Milan, which his brother had commissioned. His funerary monument was created by Francesco Solari.

Because of his dedication to faith, Gabriele Sforza was sometime later considered as blessed, even if he has no liturgical memory.
