= Diet of Regensburg =

Diet of Regensburg may refer to any of the sessions of the Imperial Diet, Imperial States or the prince-electors of the Holy Roman Empire which took place in the Imperial City of Regensburg (Ratisbon), now in Germany.

An incomplete lists of Diets of Regensburg (Ratisbon) includes:

- Diet of Regensburg (976)
- Diet of Regensburg (1274)
- Diet of Regensburg (1454), where bishop Giovanni Castiglione represented Pope Nicholas V
- Diet of Regensburg (1471)
- Diet of Regensburg (1532)
- Diet of Regensburg (1541) (Colloquy of Ratisbon)
- Diet of Regensburg (1546), where bishop Michael Helding served as a Roman Catholic delegate
- Diet of Regensburg (1556/57)
- Diet of Regensburg (1567)
- Diet of Regensburg (1576)
- Diet of Regensburg (1594)
- Diet of Regensburg (1597/98)
- Diet of Regensburg (1601)
- Diet of Regensburg (1603)
- Diet of Regensburg (1608)
- Diet of Regensburg (1613)
- Diet of Regensburg (1623)
- Diet of Regensburg (1630)
- Diet of Regensburg (1640/41)
- Diet of Regensburg (1653/54)
- Perpetual Diet of Regensburg (1663–1806)

== See also ==
- Regensburg Interim
