= Georg Hesler =

German Roman Catholic cardinal and bishop (1427–1482)

His Eminence Georg Hesler
- Prince-Bishop of Passau
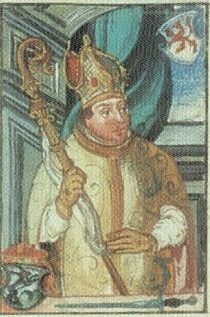
- Church: Catholic Church
- Diocese: Passau
- Appointed: 13 February 1480
- Term ended: 21 September 1482
- Predecessor: Ulrich von Nußdorf
- Successor: Friedrich Mauerkircher
- Other posts: Cardinal-Priest of Santa Lucia in Selci (1477-1482)

Orders
- Ordination: 1458 by Giovanni Castiglione
- Consecration: 21 September 1482 by Pope Sixtus IV
- Created cardinal: 10 December 1477 by Pope Sixtus IV
- Rank: Cardinal-Priest

Personal details
- Born: 1427 Würzburg, Germany
- Died: 21 September 1482 (aged 54–55) Near Vienna, Austria

Georg Hesler (1427–1482) (called the Cardinal of Santa Lucia) was a German Roman Catholic cardinal and bishop.

== Biography ==
Georg Hesler was born in Würzburg in 1427, the second son of commoners Hans and Agatha Hesler. With his brother Johannes, he traveled to Italy in 1454, studying at the University of Pavia and becoming a doctor of both laws.

After graduating, he went to the papal court in Rome where Pope Callixtus III appointed him privy treasurer on 5 May 1456. He became a canon of the Stiftskirche dedicated to Saints Peter and Paul in Öhringen, and of the church dedicated to St. Stephan in Bamberg. He was also awarded the parish of Dollnstein. He was ordained as a priest by Giovanni Castiglione, Bishop of Pavia, in 1458.

He then returned to help his family recover possessions they had lost. During this time, he entered the service of Dietrich Schenk von Erbach, Archbishop of Mainz. After the death of the archbishop's secretary, Hesler took over as his secretary, and gained a canonry in the collegiate church of Saints Peter and Alexander in Aschaffenburg.

In autumn 1458, he returned to the papal court, where Pope Pius II was the new pope. At the end of 1459, he was in the service of Albert VI, Archduke of Austria. In 1460, he became an assessor of the Aulic Council in Vienna; at this time, he registered at the University of Vienna.

Later in 1460, he was appointed one of seven members of the cathedral chapter of Cologne Cathedral and moved to Cologne. During this period, he formed a close friendship with Ruprecht of the Palatinate, future Archbishop of Cologne. In 1463, when Ruprecht became archbishop, he appointed Kesler as his chancellor and sent Kesler to Rome to obtain papal approval of Ruprecht's election as archbishop.

After successfully completing this mission, he served as a counselor to Matthias Corvinus, King of Hungary. In 1464, he became secretary to Frederick III, Holy Roman Emperor and also served as his ambassador to the Kingdom of France.

In early 1466, he became domherr of Speyer Cathedral by special papal permission. He traveled to Rome in October 1466, at which time the pope made him a protonotary apostolic. In 1474, Friedrich III made him an advisor. He performed so well that he later became the emperor's chancellor, in which capacity he arranged the marriage of the emperor's son Maximilian and Mary of Burgundy.

In 1474, the emperor requested that Pope Sixtus IV make Hesler a cardinal. Over the opposition of the College of Cardinals, Sixtus IV announced in February 1477 that he intended to make Hesler a cardinal. As such, in the consistory of 10 December 1477, Hesler was created a cardinal priest. On 12 December 1477, he received the titulus of Santa Lucia in Selci (a deaconry raised pro illa vice to the status of titulus), and Hesler received the red hat on 13 January 1478.

Cardinal Hesler wished to become a prince-bishop. His patron, Friedrich III, convinced Sixtus IV to issue a papal bull dated 1 July 1478 forbidding the cathedral chapters of St. Martin's Cathedral, Utrecht, Liège Cathedral, Cambrai Cathedral, the Cathedral of Trier, Cologne Cathedral, Mainz Cathedral, Würzburg Cathedral, Bamberg Cathedral, Eichstätt Cathedral, Speyer Cathedral, Salzburg Cathedral, St. Stephan's Cathedral, Passau, Augsburg Cathedral, Freising Cathedral, Münster Cathedral, Regensburg Cathedral, and Besançon Cathedral from electing a bishop without the prior permission of the pope and the emperor. In Speyer, Strassburg, and Passau, the chapters simply ignored this prohibition.

Following the death of Ulrich of Nußdorf, Prince-Bishop of Passau, on 9 September 1479, the cathedral chapter of Passau Cathedral elected Friedrich Mauerkircher as the new bishop. Mauerkircher stayed in Rome to settle the question. Sixtus IV annulled his election and on 28 January 1480 insisted on the election of Cardinal Hesler to the position, issuing papal bulls threatening Mauerkircher and his supporters with excommunication and interdict. Pope Sixtus IV personally consecrated Hesler as a bishop on 13 February 1480.

On 1 May 1480, Hesler left Rome for the imperial court. Three canons from the Passau cathedral chapter now defected to Hesler's side. They proclaimed Hesler the rightful bishop and Hesler's investiture took place in Vienna without incident.

However, Passau still refused to recognize Hesler as its ruler. It remained in a state of rebellion until the emperor pronounced the proscription over the city in 1482. Finally, in August 1482, an agreement was reached whereby Hesler would become bishop and Mauerkircher was recognized as his successor.

Hesler died on 21 September 1482 while traveling to Vienna to meet the emperor. He is buried in the church of Santa Maria ad Ripas in Vienna.
