= Santa Maria Incoronata =

Santa Maria Incoronata or Holy Mary Crowned is an Italian of veneration of the Virgin as Queen. In Italy it can refer to:

- Santa Maria Incoronata, Milan
- Santa Maria Incoronata, Naples
