= Campeggio =

Campeggio is a surname. Notable people with the surname include:

- Lorenzo Campeggio (1474–1539), Italian cardinal and politician
- Alessandro Campeggio (1504–1554), Italian Roman Catholic bishop and cardinal
