= Anastasio Fontebuoni =

Italian painter (1571–1626)

Anastasio Fontebuoni (also spelt Anastazio Fontebuoni, or Anastagio Fontebuoni) (1571–1626) was an Italian painter of the Baroque, native of Florence. Fontebuoni proved to be one of the Florentine painters are more open to the influence of Caravaggio's naturalism. Fontebuoni was educated in the school of Domenico Passignano. According to Giovanni Baglioni, he visited Rome in the pontificate of Paul V, where he painted some pictures for the churches. His work flourished in Rome from 1600 to 1620 but this promising artist died young in Florence in 1626.

== Major works ==
- San Giovanni dei Fiorentini: two paintings of the Birth of the Virgin and the Death of the Virgin, which are considered his best works.
- Santa Prisca: frescoes depicting the Saints and angels with the instruments of passion
- Santa Balbina: frescoes of the triumphal arch depicting Saint Paul and Saint Peter. Frescoes in the apse representing Saint Balbina between other martyrs.
- Santa Lucia in Selci: the Annunciation
- San Giacomo degli Spagnoli: frescoes of the vault
