= Johann Gropper =

German cardinal and church politician

His Eminence Johann Gropper
- Cardinal Deacon of Santa Lucia in Selci
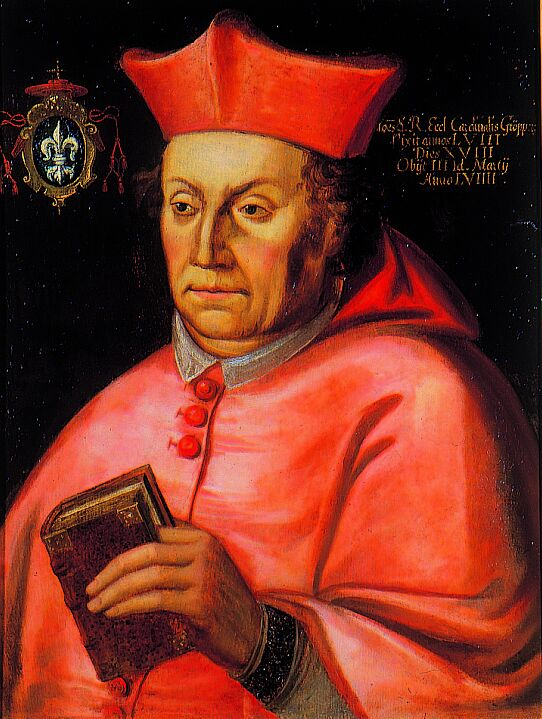
- Cardinal Johann Gropper, portrait from 1555
- Church: Roman Catholic
- Installed: 13 January 1556
- Term ended: 13 March 1559
- Predecessor: Alessandro Campeggio
- Successor: Innico d'Avalos d'Aragona

Orders
- Created cardinal: 20 December 1555 by Paul IV

Personal details
- Born: 24 February 1503 Soest, Arnsberg
- Baptised: 24 February 1503
- Died: 13 March 1559 (aged 56) Rome, Papal States
- Buried: Santa Maria dell'Anima, Rome

This is about the 16th century churchman. For the 20th Century political artist, see William Gropper.

Johann Gropper (John or German: Johannes Gropper; 24 February 1503 – 13 March 1559) was a German cardinal and church politician of the Reformation period.

== Early life: follower of Erasmus ==
After being made keeper of the seal of the archbishopric of Cologne, he was appointed scholasticus of St. Gerson in 1527. Gropper was an adherent of Erasmus, and aided the reform efforts of Hermann von Wied, archbishop of Cologne. This led him, after having completed his legal studies at Cologne in 1525, to devote himself to theological study. He edited the Landrecht of Cologne, and also the canons of the provincial council at Cologne held in 1536 (both published in 1538, together with a detailed manual of Christian doctrine which he had composed).

In both of these Gropper's Erasmian tendency showed itself; in both he took pains to make the Bible and the Church Fathers his point of departure. In many matters, especially in the doctrine of justification, he approximated Protestant views, but he did not approve of the doctrine of the Reformers concerning the concept and the organization of the Church. He championed the seven sacraments and the veneration of images and relics. He rejected the doctrine of the priesthood of believers, he defended the hierarchical order of the Middle Ages and the primacy of the pope, though on these very points his differences with the representatives of the papal system were apparent. Protestant and Jesuit writers alike censured the book.

== Against the Reformation in Cologne ==
Gropper took a zealous part in the negotiations for church union and in the religious colloquies held in 1540 and 1541 in Hagenau, Worms, and Regensburg. In the latter place he secured agreement on the formulation of the doctrine of justification; but he and his sympathizers could not reach an understanding with the Protestants about the organization of the Church. When, therefore, Archbishop Hermann, felt himself committed to a far-reaching reform of ecclesiastical affairs in his archdiocese, and invited the Straßburg Reformer Martin Butzer for that purpose, Gropper came forward as the spokesman of the clergy of Cologne in opposition to the plans for Protestant reform proposed by his former patron; as a representative of the cathedral chapter he sought in the Landtag of March and July, 1543, to persuade the Estates to oppose Hermann and Butzer.

As he was unsuccessful, he prepared an answer to the memorial for reformation which the archbishop laid before the latter Landtag. The answer was approved by a committee of the cathedral chapter and was published in 1554 in its name, in German and Latin. When even this document did not convert the archbishop, Gropper and the members of his party lodged complaints against him with the emperor and the pope. Gropper now negotiated eagerly with imperial counselors. He addressed to the emperor his Wahrhaftige Antwort against accusations by Butzer. In connection with this fight against the Protestantism, Gropper came to favor the settlement of the Jesuits in Cologne. Canisius, who was especially advanced by him, praises in the highest terms Gropper's merits in saving Catholicism within the archdiocese of Cologne. When the victory was won, and the previous coadjutor, Adolf von Schaumburg, had been enthroned as bishop, Gropper received the provostship in Bonn formerly held by a brother of Hermann. Under the new archbishop, Gropper worked by word and pen against the Protestants; he likewise acted as imperial commissioner for the carrying out of the Augsburg Interim in his native city of Soest.

== Later years ==
How little in accordance with his wishes, however, ecclesiastical affairs developed in the next years, he himself states in a letter of 1556, in which he sets forth the reasons why he did not wish to accept the dignity of the cardinalate which had been offered to him.

A letter of the following year betrays a still gloomier mood; he begged Peter Canisius not to be suspicious of him if he held aloof from the religious colloquy soon to be held in Worms. In 1558 he saw new dangers arise for those near him, when Johann Gebhard von Mansfeld was chosen archbishop of Cologne. To prevent his confirmation by the pope, Gropper decided to make the journey to Rome, whither Paul IV had formerly invited him in vain. The pope received him with honor and demanded his opinion in weighty matters; nevertheless, not only did he not accomplish that which he wished in the Cologne affair, but he was denounced to the Inquisition by the Venetian Delfino.

On March 13, 1559, he died in poverty, and was buried in the church of Santa Maria dell'Anima. The pope, probably convinced by Gropper's defense that he was innocent, spoke before a consistory on March 15 in praise of the services of the deceased and transferred his benefices to his brother Kaspar. As a papal nuncio at Cologne Kaspar was later the zealous servant of the Counter-reformation, which directed its efforts against the Erasmian tendency which Gropper had once represented; with the result that in 1596 Gropper's Enchiridion, "the most detailed and most important pre-Tridentine dogmatic of the Reformation period," was put upon the Index Librorum Prohibitorum.
