= Santa Lucia in Selci =

Ancient Roman Catholic church in Rome, Italy

Church of Saint Lucy at Selci
- Santa Lucia in Selci
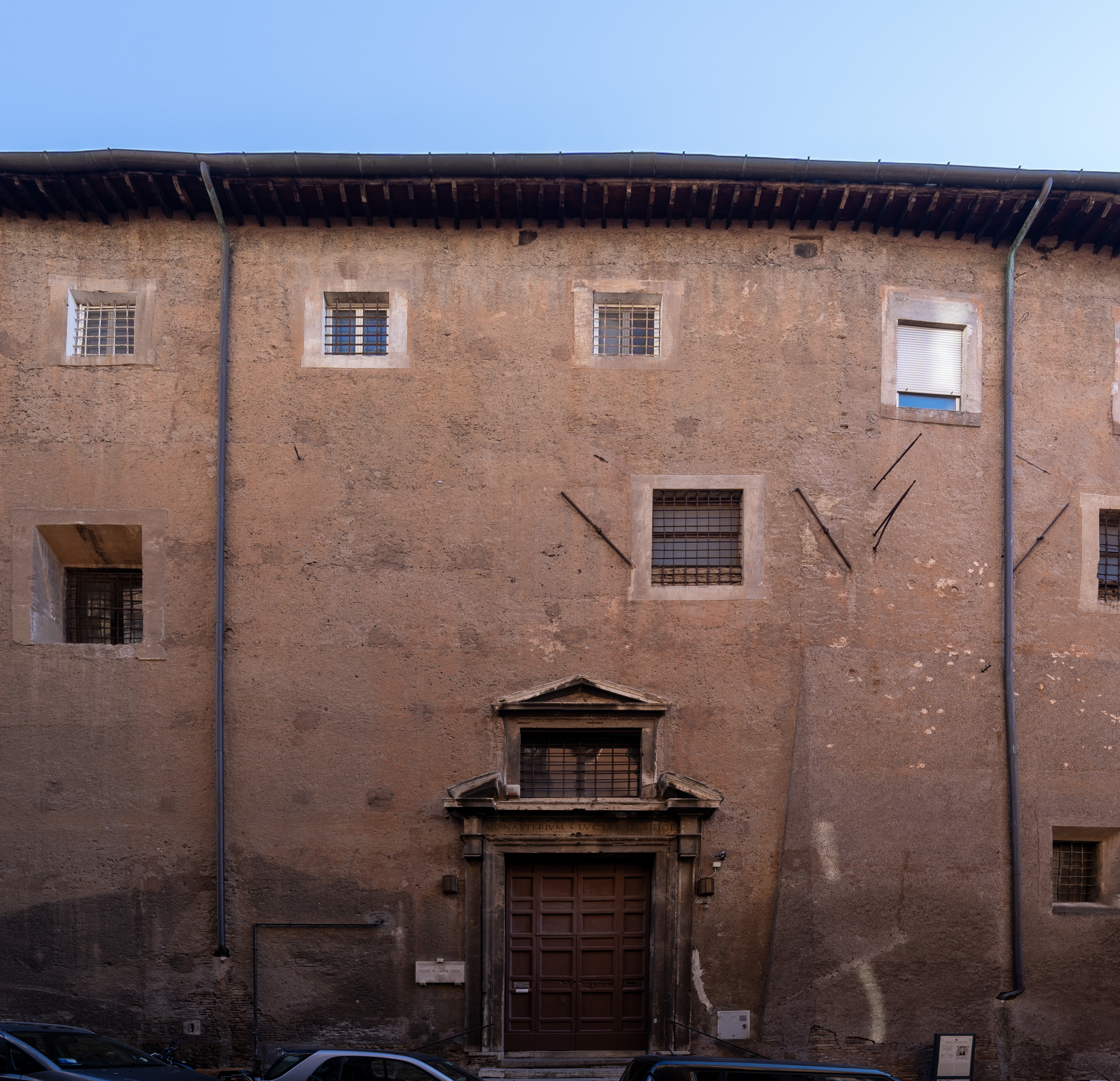
- Entrance of the church.
- Click on the map for a fullscreen view.
- 41°53′40.6″N 12°29′47″E
- Location: Rome
- Country: Italy
- Denomination: Roman Catholic

Architecture
- Architect(s): Carlo Maderno, Francesco Borromini
- Architectural type: Church
- Style: Baroque
- Groundbreaking: 7th century
- Completed: 1638

The Church of Saint Lucy in Selci (Italian: Santa Lucia in Selci, also known as Santa Lucia in Silice or Santa Lucia in Orfea (in Orphea, in Orthea)) is an ancient Roman Catholic church, located in Rome, dedicated to Saint Lucy, a 4th-century virgin and martyr.

== History ==
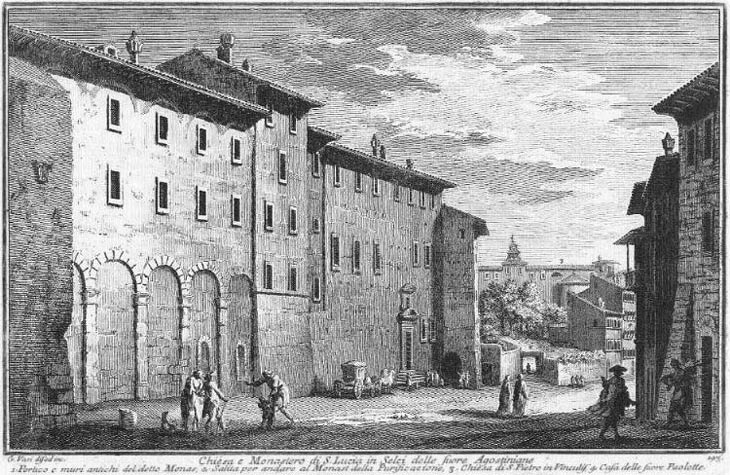
Depiction of the plain facade of the Monastery of Santa Lucia in Selci (circa 1743), by Giuseppe Vasi, uses artistic license to widen the narrow street in front.

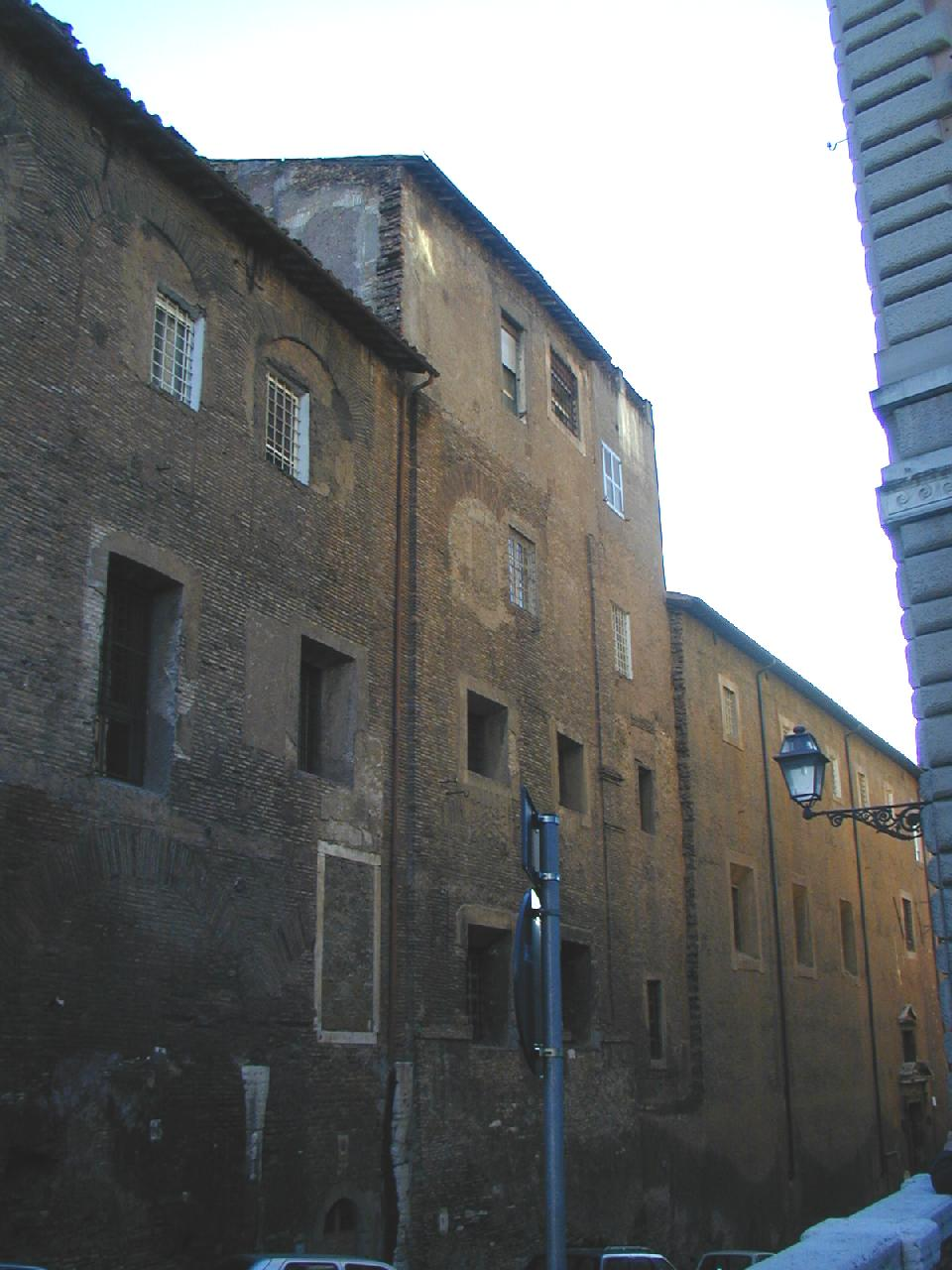
Detail of same view expressed by Vasi, with entrance to monastery and church at lower right corner.

The church was built no later than the 8th century above the ruins of a Roman structure, the Portico of Livia. According to the tradition, the first church was built under Pope Symmachus (498-514) back in the 6th century. The building was restored by Pope Honorius I in the 7th century and again by Pope Leo III in the 9th century.

The deaconry of Saint Lucy in Silice (or in Orpha) created around 300 is one of the seven original deaconries in Rome. It was confirmed by Pope Sylvester I ca. 314. The church was restored by Pope Honorius I ca 630 in the vicinity of the monumental fountain lacus orphei. It was assigned to one of the seven deacons by Pope Agatho ca. 678. According to Liber Pontificalis, this deaconry received donations from Pope Leo III (795-816). After the 10th century it was known as Santa Lucia in Silice or in Selci because it was decorated with large flintstones (selci). The deaconry was suppressed in 1587 by Pope Sixtus V.

In the 13th century, a monastery was attached to the church, enclosing it. In 1370, it was granted to the Carthusians. In 1534, it was given to the Benedictines, and in 1568 Pope Pius V granted it to the Augustinians, who still serve the church. Pope Urban VIII altered the monastery in 1624, enlarging it and dividing it into three parts. One was kept by the Augustinians, one was given to Dominican friars and the last was given to the Poor Clares. The monastery was amplified in 1603 according to designs by Bartolomeo Bassi, active in Rome at that time. However, all that remains of this amplification is the portal of the exterior. In 1878 the Italian state expropriated the convent of the Poor Clares, adjacent to San Lorenzo in Panisperna, but the nuns came to the monastery of Santa Lucia in Selci.

Carlo Maderno reconstructed the church in 1604, keeping it enclosed within the Augustinian monastery. Francesco Borromini worked in the restoration of the church in 1637-1638, in the decoration of the Trinity Chapel, in 1628-1639.

== Interior ==
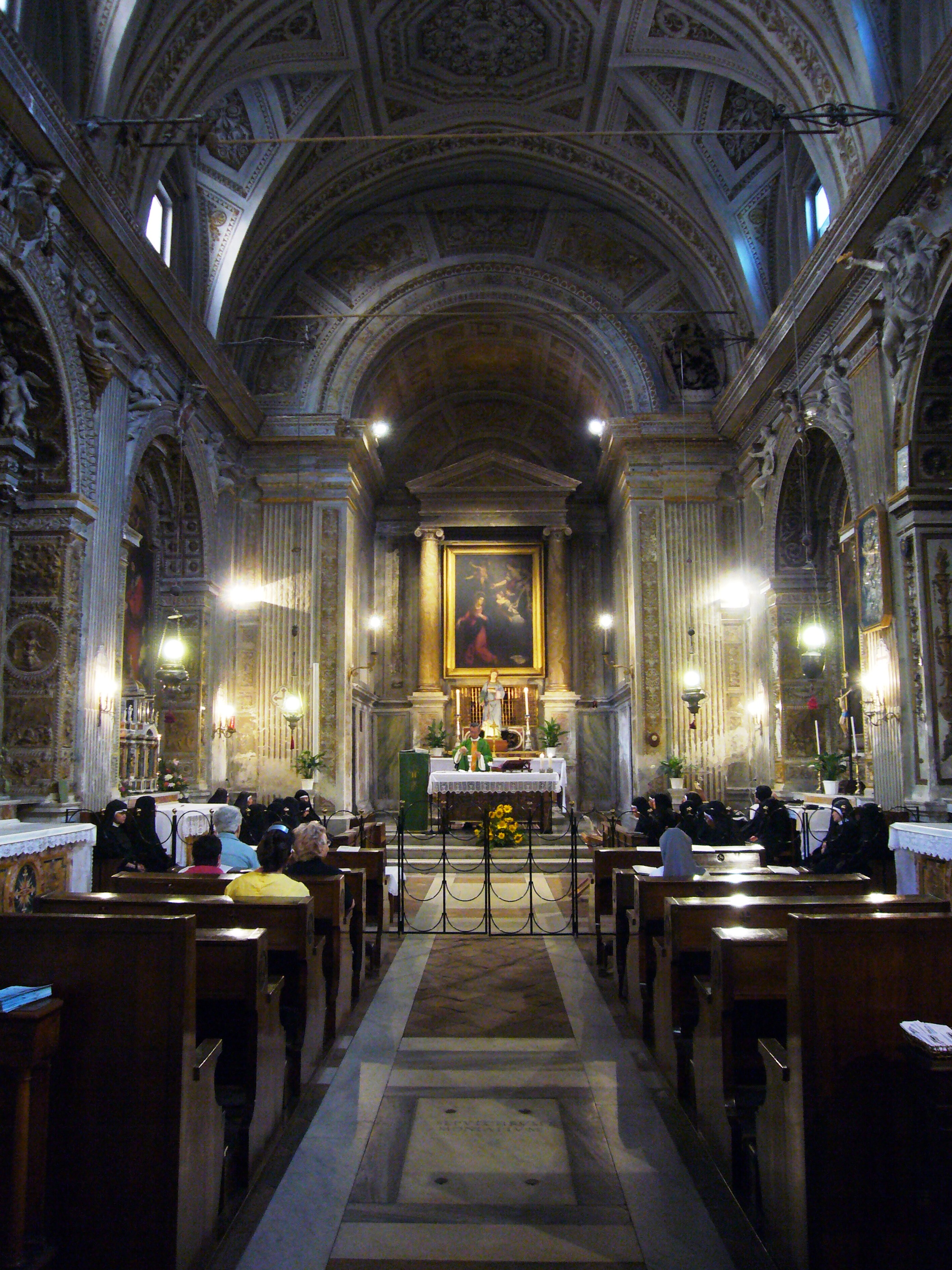
View of nave interior toward main altar.

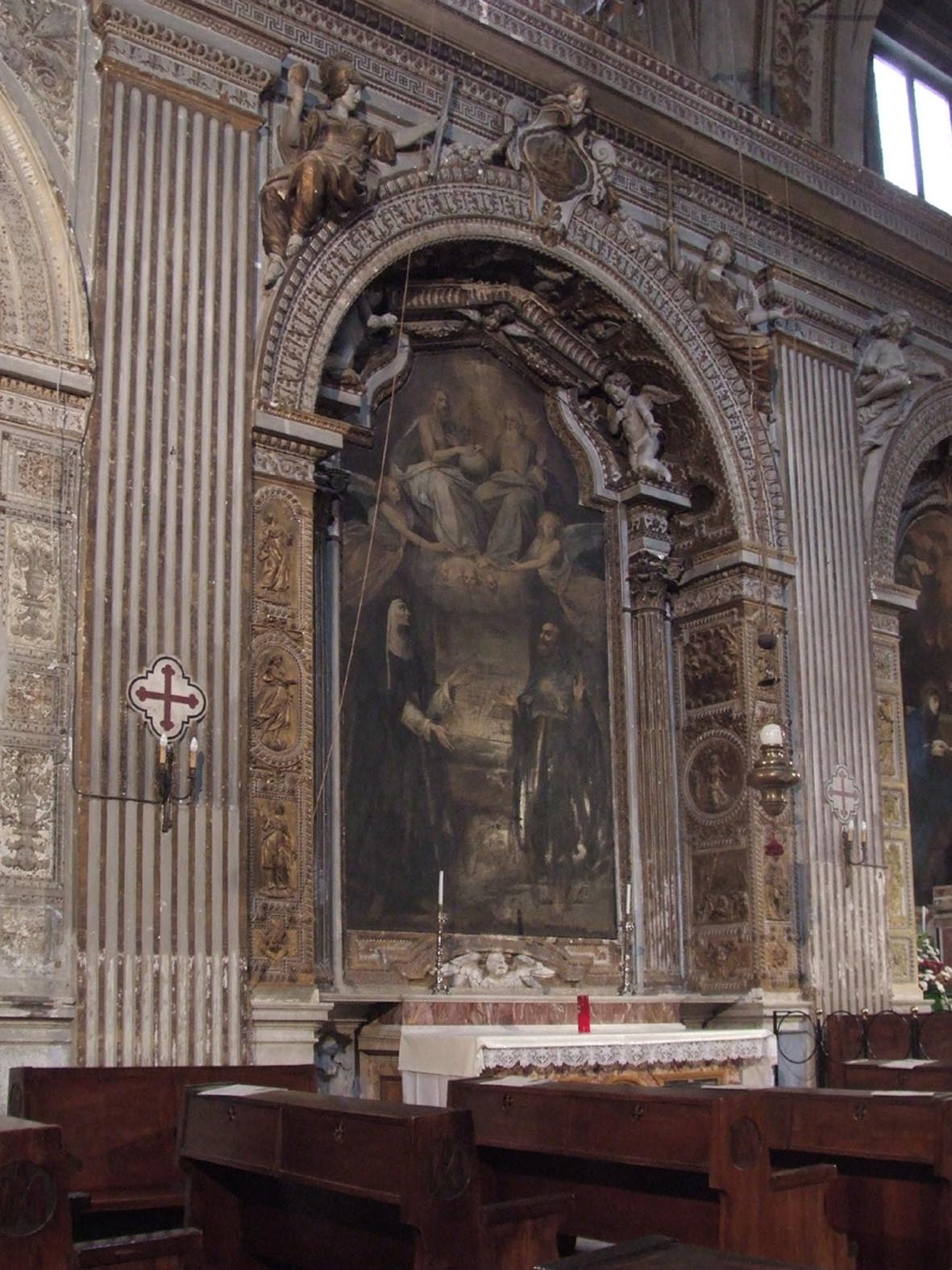
Landi Chapel, by Francesco Borromini

The church is built on a rectangular ground plan and barrel vault. It has a single nave with three shallow chapels on each side. The barrel vault has a 19th-century fresco by an unknown artist that replaced one with the same motif by Giovanni Antonio Lelli, depicting the Glory of St Lucy. The counterfaçade is decorated with the painting God the Father by Cavaliere d'Arpino. The high altar dates from the 19th century, and replaces one made by Borromini. The painting above the high altar depicting the Annunciation is a work of the Florentine painter Anastasio Fontebuoni.

The Landi Chapel, commissioned by the prioress Vittoria Landi, is the first chapel on the left. It was decorated by Borromini, and the altarpiece depicts The Holy Trinity with Saint Augustine and Saint Monica by Cavaliere d'Arpino .

The Chapel of the Blessed Sacrament, the second on the left, contains works attributed to Carlo Maderno: a tabernacle in polychrome marble and gilt bronze and the alabaster statues.

At the first altarpiece on the right depicts Martyrdom of St Lucy by Giovanni Lanfranco.

The Vision of St Augustine by Andrea Camassei is at the second altar on the right. In the choir, attributed to Francesco Borromini, several paintings by Baccio Ciarpi are displayed .

== List of Cardinal-deacons of Santa Lucia in Selci ==
List of the Cardinal-deacons until the suppression of the deaconry in 1577:

- Cardinal Cencio Savelli (1193–1201)
- Cardinal Leone Brancaleone (December 1200 - 1202)
- Cardinal Pelagio Galvani (1205 - 1210)
- Cardinal Rainiero (1213 – 18 June 1217)
- Cardinal Francesco Napoleone Orsini (17 December 1295 - 1312)
- Cardinal Gaillard de la Mothe (17 December 1316 - 20 December 1356)
- ...
- Cardinal Philibert Hugonet (17 May 1473 – 17 August 1477)
- Cardinal Georg Hesler von Wurzburg (12 December 1477 – 21 September 1482)
- Cardinal Hélie de Bourdeilles (15 November 1483 – 5 July 1484)
- Cardinal Ippolito I d'Este (23 September 1493 – 3 September 1520)
- Vacant (1520 - 1540)
- Cardinal Giacomo Savelli (16 April 1540 – 8 January 1543)
- Cardinal Ranuccio Farnese (5 May 1546 – 8 October 1546)
- Cardinal Alessandro Campeggio (4 December 1551 – 21 September 1554)
- Cardinal Johann Gropper (13 January 1556 – 13 March 1559)
- Cardinal Innico d'Avalos d'Aragona (3 June 1561 – 30 July 1563)
- Cardinal Luigi d'Este (22 October 1563 – 31 July 1577)

== Books and articles ==
- Schroeder, Joseph (1913). "John Gropper" . In Herbermann, Charles (ed.). Catholic Encyclopedia. New York: Robert Appleton Company.
- Ott, Michael (1913). "Pope Honorius II" . In Herbermann, Charles (ed.). Catholic Encyclopedia. New York: Robert Appleton Company.
- Caroline Goodson, The Rome of Pope Paschal I: Papal Power, Urban Renovation, Church Rebuilding and Relic Translation, 817-824 (Cambridge: CUP 2010), pp. 101-102, 297.
