= Simpliciano of the Nativity =

Venerable Simpliciano della Natività O.F.M.

Priest
- Born: Aniello Francesco Saverio Maresca; 11 May 1827; Meta, Naples, Campania, Kingdom of the Two Sicilies
- Died: 25 May 1898 (aged 71); Rome, Kingdom of Italy
- Venerated in: Roman Catholic Church
- Attributes: Franciscan habit
- Patronage: Franciscan Sisters of the Sacred Hearts

Simpliciano of the Nativity (11 May 1827 – 25 May 1898) – born Aniello Maresca – was a Franciscan priest and the founder of the Congregation of the Franciscan Sisters of the Sacred Hearts (SFSC/FSSH) in Santa Balbina, Rome, Italy.

== Early days ==
Simpliciano of the Nativity was born at Meta in the Campania region of southern Italy on May 11, 1827. He was baptized on the same day as Aniello Francesco Maresca in the Church of the Madonna del Lauro. Very little is known about his earlier years except for his prowess in Latin and his fondness for frequenting activities in the Franciscan churches which abounded in the area. In his adolescent years he enrolled as a nautical student. One year, during the Feast of Saint Aniello (a Franciscan), he heard a panegyric about the saint which may have inspired him to follow the ancient call of his heart. Thus, at the age of seventeen, he joined the Order of the Friars Minor (Franciscans of the Strict Observance) in Naples.

== Calling ==
As a young friar, he dedicated himself to theological studies and was devoted in his prayer life and asceticism. After his ordination as a priest, he was appointed "guardian" in the convent of Portici, where he used one wing of the convent to provide free education for poor children.

On June 5, 1869, he was called to serve as the Secretary General of the Franciscan Alcantarines at the Roman Curia. A need arose for an additional chaplain at the Consolazione Hospital, in the department specifically intended for women prostitutes who were mandated by the Italian government to undergo periodic clinical check ups. The post was offered to him and he accepted it readily with the blessing of his Superior. During his free time, he heard confessions while he officiated regularly at Mass. In one of his masses, he gave a sermon on the "Parable of the Lost Sheep". Immediately after the service, fifteen young girls sought his counsel, telling him that they wanted to go back to the path of Christian moral life. After that, with the blessing of his Superior, Bernardino Portogruaro, he took upon himself the mission of helping to alleviate the plight of these girls.

== Mission ==
Six years later, he founded an institution, the "Istituto di Sta. Margherita" in Rome where in a span of 10 years, more than 800 girls were rehabilitated and reintegrated back into their families. It stood adjacent to the Sta. Balbina Church, the very spot where the first nucleus of the SFSC's, then called the Margheritines, was born and was nurtured under the guidance of Simpliciano. The institute was aimed for the education of the girls towards self-sufficiency and their reintroduction to genuine Christian life. Programs offered included vocational courses like embroidery, sewing and knitting, baking, housekeeping and the plating of sacred vessels. The girls were also instructed in the social graces, hygiene and the Catholic catechism. Year after year, his work became known and published even in the local newspapers of Rome and in the Franciscan "Eco" aside from the monthly newsletter "Riabilitazione e Lavoro" of which he himself was the Editor. He started receiving referrals, donations and invitations from all over Europe. During his lifetime, his apostolic activity proceeded onwards with the help of donations from all sectors of society. Sensitive to the signs of the times, he understood that the very young who are homeless and orphaned or neglected need protection and nurture to keep them from falling victims of human egoism and depravity. For them he also instituted orphanages and provided formal schooling.

== Principles ==
The underlying principle of Simpliciano's pedagogy was "Prayer and Work", basically following the Benedictine "Ora et Labora" but in his case with the added element of rehabilitation through work. This principle is behind the primary mission call of the SFSC's, that of "serving as fortresses for humanity against the torrents of egoism and immorality.". (Constitution of the Congregation, 1886)

Simpliciano, the founder, educator, theologian and spiritual director died on May 25, 1898. His ideals and experiences with God remain as an example to hundreds of religious sisters of the congregation he founded.

Today, the Congregation of the Franciscan Sisters of the Sacred Hearts operates on four continents, Europe, South America, Asia, and Africa, dedicating itself to the education of the young in schools, parishes, orphanages, rehabilitation centers and boarding houses. Simpliciano's apostolic fervour is further extended to the aged, the sick in hospital and the provision of assistance to priests.
