= Giovanni Antonio Lelli =

Italian painter

Giovanni Antonio Lelli (1591 – 3 August 1640) was an Italian painter of the Baroque period. He was a pupil of the painter Cigoli. In the church of San Matteo in Merulana in Rome (now demolished), he painted an Annunciation. He painted a Visitation for the Convent della Minerva. Giovanni Antonio Lelli also painted a ceiling fresco (now lost) for the church of Santa Lucia in Selci.
