= Santa Balbina =

Roman Catholic basilica, a landmark of Rome, Italy

- Saint Balbina (in English); Sancta Balbina (in Latin)
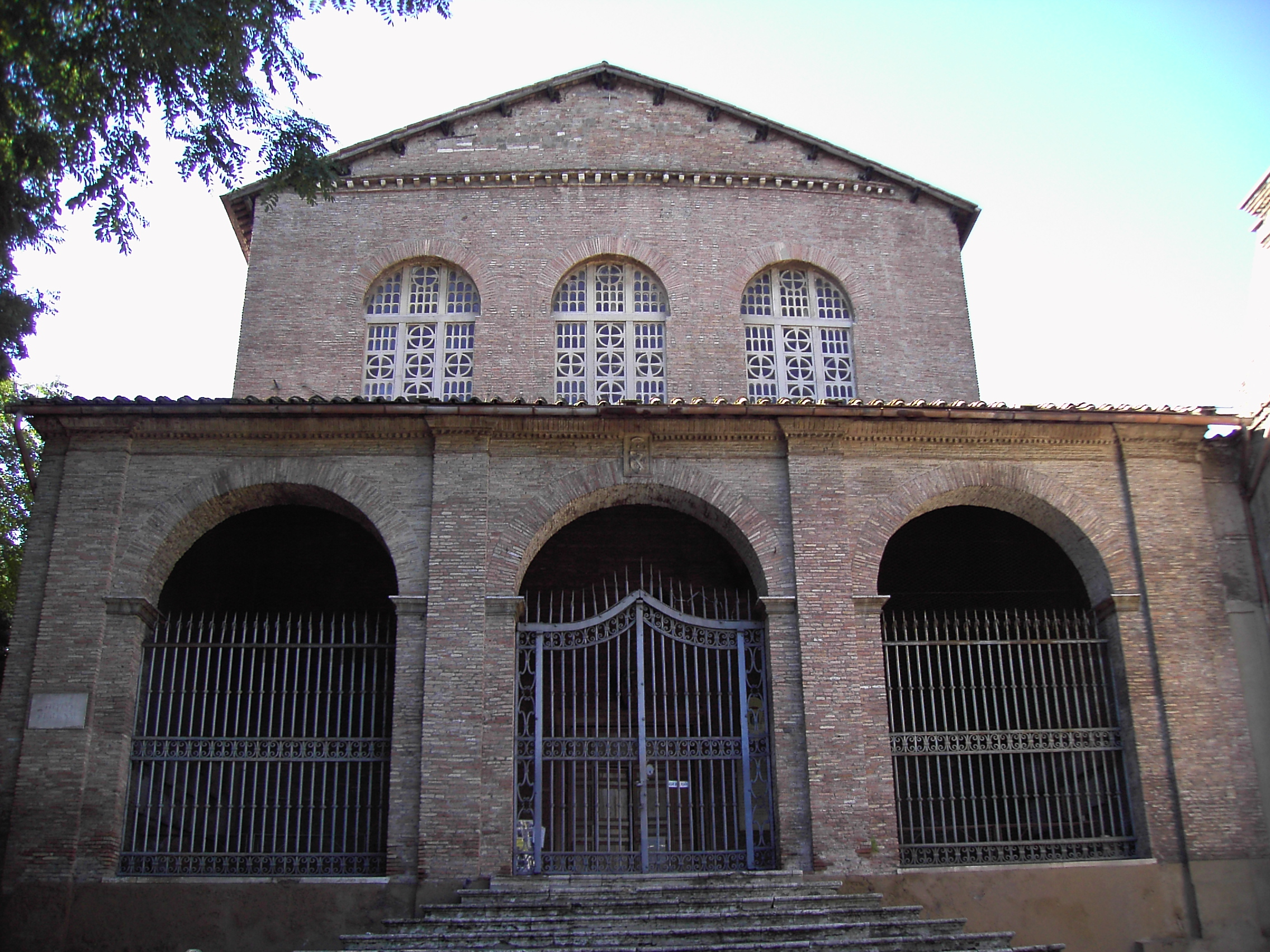
- The façade of Santa Balbina.
- Click on the map for a fullscreen view
- 41°52′50″N 12°29′23″E
- Location: Rome
- Country: Italy
- Denomination: Roman Catholic

History
- Status: Titular church
- Dedication: Balbina of Rome

Architecture
- Architectural type: Church
- Groundbreaking: 4th Century

Administration
- District: Lazio
- Province: Rome

Santa Balbina is a Roman Catholic basilica church in a quiet area on the side of the Aventine Hill, in Rome. It is next to the Baths of Caracalla.

== History ==
This had been the site of the large home of Lucius Fabius Cilo, a wealthy Roman of the late second century. It had been a gift to him from Septimius Severus, and is marked on the Forma Urbis Romae. Christian ownership resulted in substantial renovation in around 370: walls were heightened and the internal layout was modified along the lines of today's church. The original title of this church is uncertain. It has been suggested it was known as titulus Tigridae, referring perhaps to an early sponsor or founder. It has been handed down that when the Emperor Constantine departed to found the city that became Constantinople, he bade farewell to Pope Sylvester I at this church.

In the eighth century, the basilica was consecrated by Pope Gregory III to the entirely mythical St Balbina, whose legend has her dying around 130 CE.

The building underwent many revisions, including under Pope Paul II in 1464, and under Cardinal Pompeo Arrigoni in 1600. Initially affiliated with the Augustinians, the church came into the charge of secular priests of Naples during Pope Innocent XII's time.

The adjoining monastery has a commanding medieval defence tower. Inside the basilica there is a very fine episcopal chair with Cosmatesque decoration from the 13th century. The church was heavily restored in the 1930s. An ancient sarcophagus was discovered during the restoration. It is now used as a font. Frescoes were discovered on the side walls from the 9th to 14th centuries. The Baroque frescoes in the apse and the triumphal arch were painted by Anastasio Fontebuoni in 1599. The triumphal arch is decorated with the figures of Sts Paul and Peter. In the apse the mythical St Balbina is depicted between martyrs.

Previous titulars include Alfonso de la Cueva, marqués de Bedmar and Francisco Jiménez de Cisneros.

It was at this church in 1875 that the Franciscan priest Simpliciano of the Nativity founded the Franciscan Sisters of the Sacred Heart.

== Hungarian connection ==
In 1270 the first known Hungarian cardinal, Stephen Báncsa was buried in the basilica. Another 13th-century Hungarian clergyman, Pál, Bishop of Paphos, erected an altar in the church for Saint Nicolas. Both the altar and the grave disappeared during later centuries, but a plaque commemorates the offerings of Pál. Until 2023, the cardinal priest of this church was Péter Erdő, Archbishop of Esztergom and Primate of Hungary. He suggested the Hungarian links to the church played a part in the pope's decision to assign him Santa Balbina. Erdő recommended Hungarian pilgrims visit the basilica. The cardinal said he feels a special responsibility for the building. Because the church's physical state had deteriorated, Cardinal Erdő was appointed cardinal priest of Santa Maria Nuova in March 2023.

== List of Cardinal-Priests ==
- Guido (attested 1099)
- Vitalis (1111—1116)
- Guido (1116-1119/1120)
- Odalis (1120—1122)
- Gregorio (1125—1139)

...

- Simon d'Armentières (1294–1297)

...

- Eleazario da Sabran (18 September 1378–August 1381)
- Bandello Bandelli (19 September 1408-October 1416)
- Guglielmo Carbone (6 June 1411–22 November 1418)
- John Kemp (8 January 1440-21 July 1452)
- Amico Agnifili (13 November 1467-13 October 1469)
- Giovanni Battista Cibò (Pope Innocent VIII) (17 May 1473-January 1474)
- Girolamo Basso Della Rovere (12 December 1477-9 July 1479)
- Juan Margarit I Pau (17 March 1484-21 November 1484)
- Juan de Vera 5 October (1500-4 May 1507)
- Francisco Jiménez de Cisneros, OFM (17 May 1507-8 November 1517)
- Adrian Gouffier de Boissy (1517-1523)
- Giovanni Piccolomini (11 June 1521-24 July 1524)
- Girolamo Ghinucci (31 May 1521-25 January 1524)
- Gasparo Contarini (15 January 1537-9 November 1539)
- Pierpaolo Parisio (28 January 1540-11 May 1545)
- Jacopo Sadoleto (11 May 1545-27 November 1545)
- Otto Truchess von Waldburg (27 November 1545-28 February 1550)
- Pedro Pacheco de Villena (10 March 1550-20 September 1557)
- Lorenzo Strozzi (20 September 1557-14 December 1571)
- Gaspar Cervantes de Gaete (23 January 1572-17 October 1575)
- Gaspar de Quiroga y Vela (15 December 1578-12 November 1594)
- Pompeio Arrigoni (24 January 1597-4 April 1616)
- Antonio Zapata y Cisneros (17 October 1616-27 April 1635)
- Alfonso de la Cueva (9 July 1635-17 October 1644)
- Juan De Lugo y De Quiroga, SJ (17 October 1644-30 August 1660)
- Pascual de Aragón-Cordoba (21 November 1661-28 September 1677)
- Lazzaro Pallavicino (8 November 1677-21 April 1680)
- José Sáenz de Aguirre (10 November 1687-30 August 1694)
- Ferdinando d'Adda (2 January 1696-16 April 1714)
- Antonio Felice Zondadari (23 September 1715-9 April 1731)
- Girolamo Grimaldi (3 September 1731-18 November 1733)
- Thomas Philip Wallard D'Hénín-Liétard D'Alsace-Boussu de Chemay (2 December 1733-17 July 1752)
- Girolamo Spinola (15 February 1760-13 March 1775)
- Alessandro Mattei (27 May 1782-3 April 1786)
- Antonio Felice Zondadari (23 December 1801-13 April 1823)
- Ercole Dandini (16 May 1823-22 July 1840)
- Silvestro Belli (15 July 1841-9 September 1844)
- Giacomo Piccolomini (19 January 1846-4 October 1847)
- Giuseppe Pecci (3 October 1850-21 January 1855)
- Enrico Orfei (18 March 1858-22 December 1870)
- Giuseppe Andrea Bizzarri (5 July 1875-26 August 1877)
- Giacomo Cattani (27 February 1880-14 February 1887)
- Amilcare Malagola (19 January 1893-22 June 1895)
- Donato Maria Dell'Olio (18 April 1901-18 January 1902)
- Auguste-René-Marie Dubourg (7 December 1916-22 September 1921)
- Jean Verdier, PSS (19 February 1929-9 April 1940)
- Clément-Émile Roques (22 February 1946-4 September 1964)
- Léon-Étienne Duval (25 February 1965-30 May 1996)
- Péter Erdő (21 October 2003 - 29 March 2023)

== Gallery ==
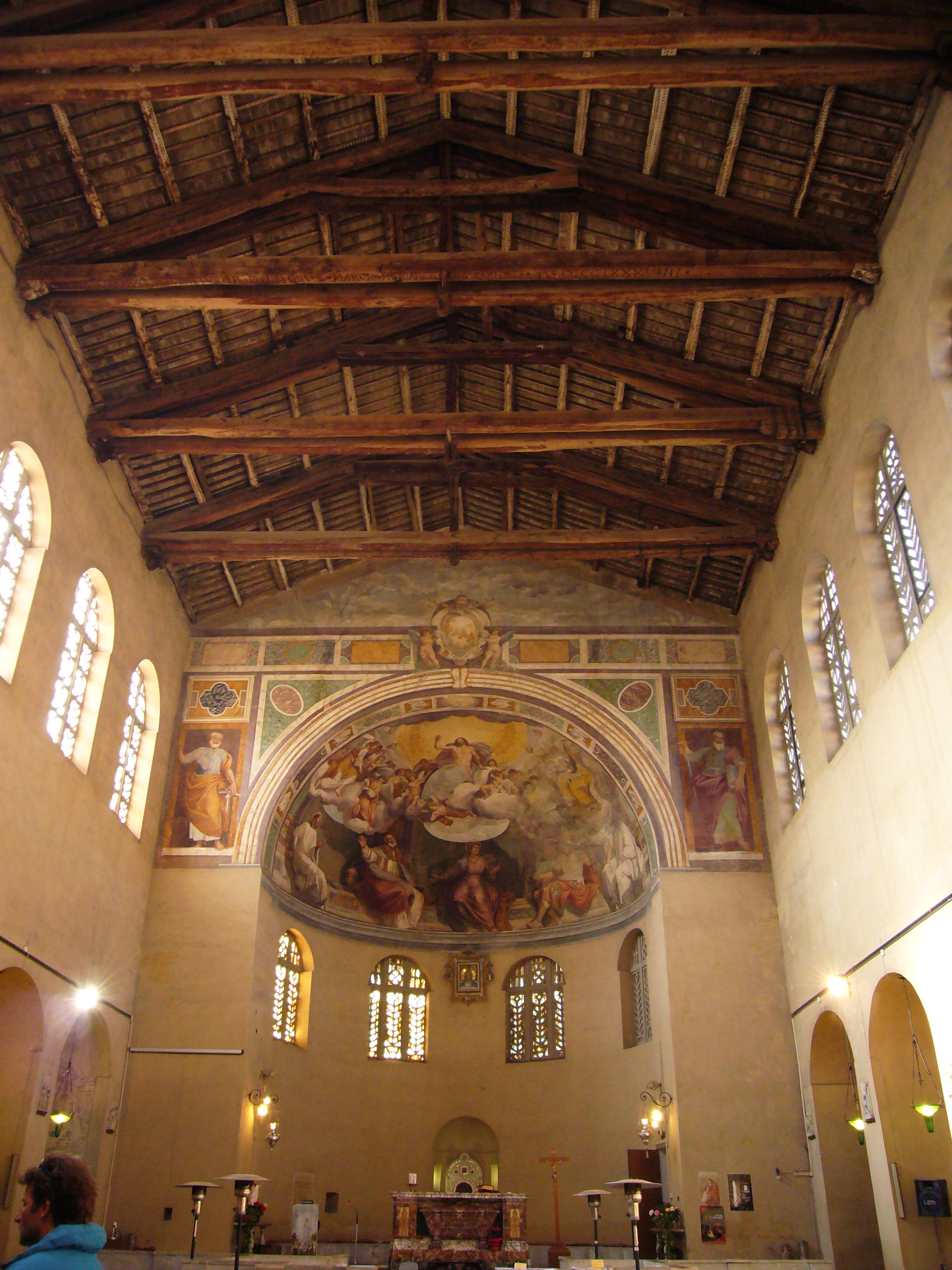
Interior

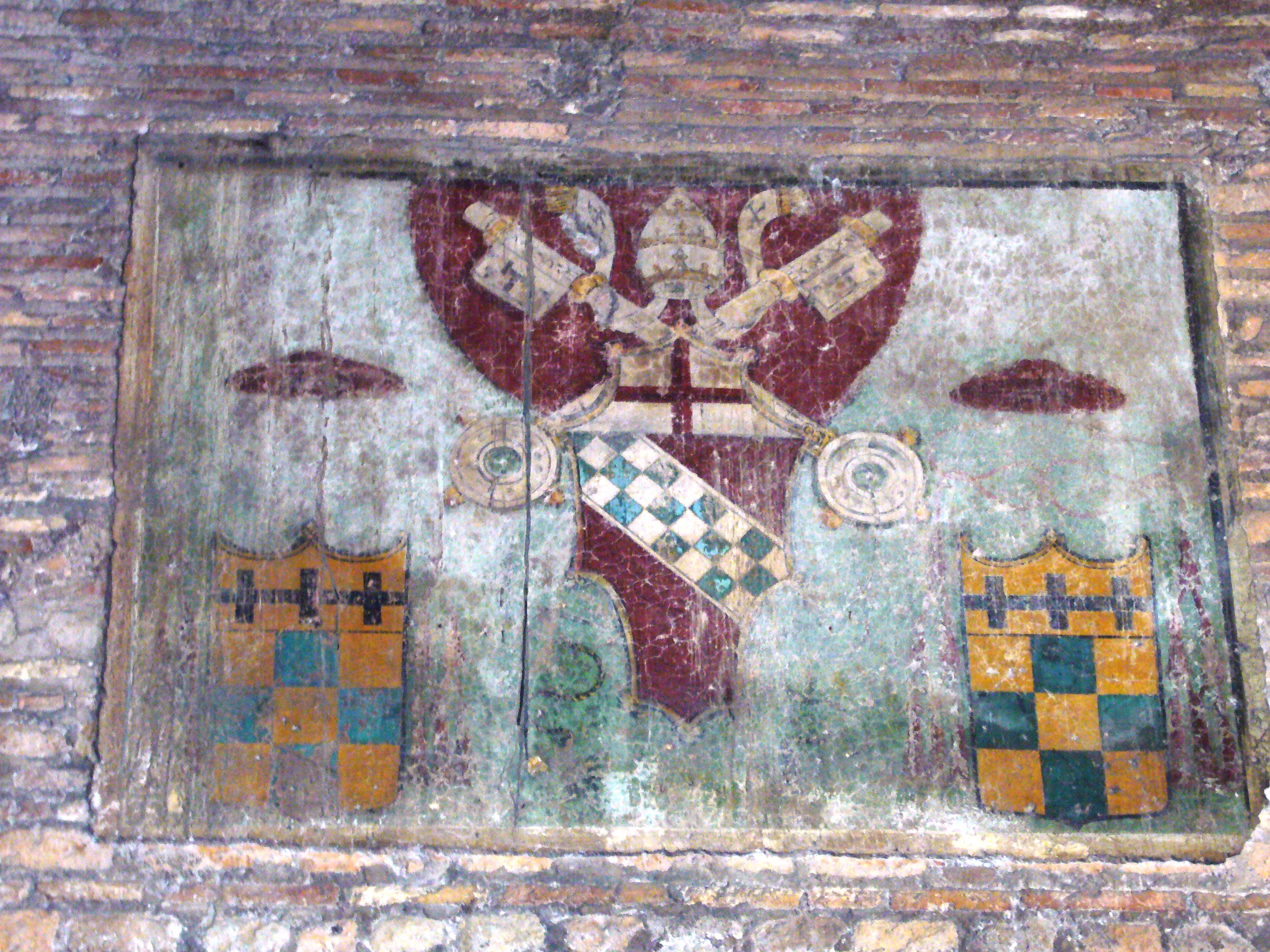
Santa Balbina in Rome: Coat of arms of Pope Innocent VIII (1473-1474) in the portico

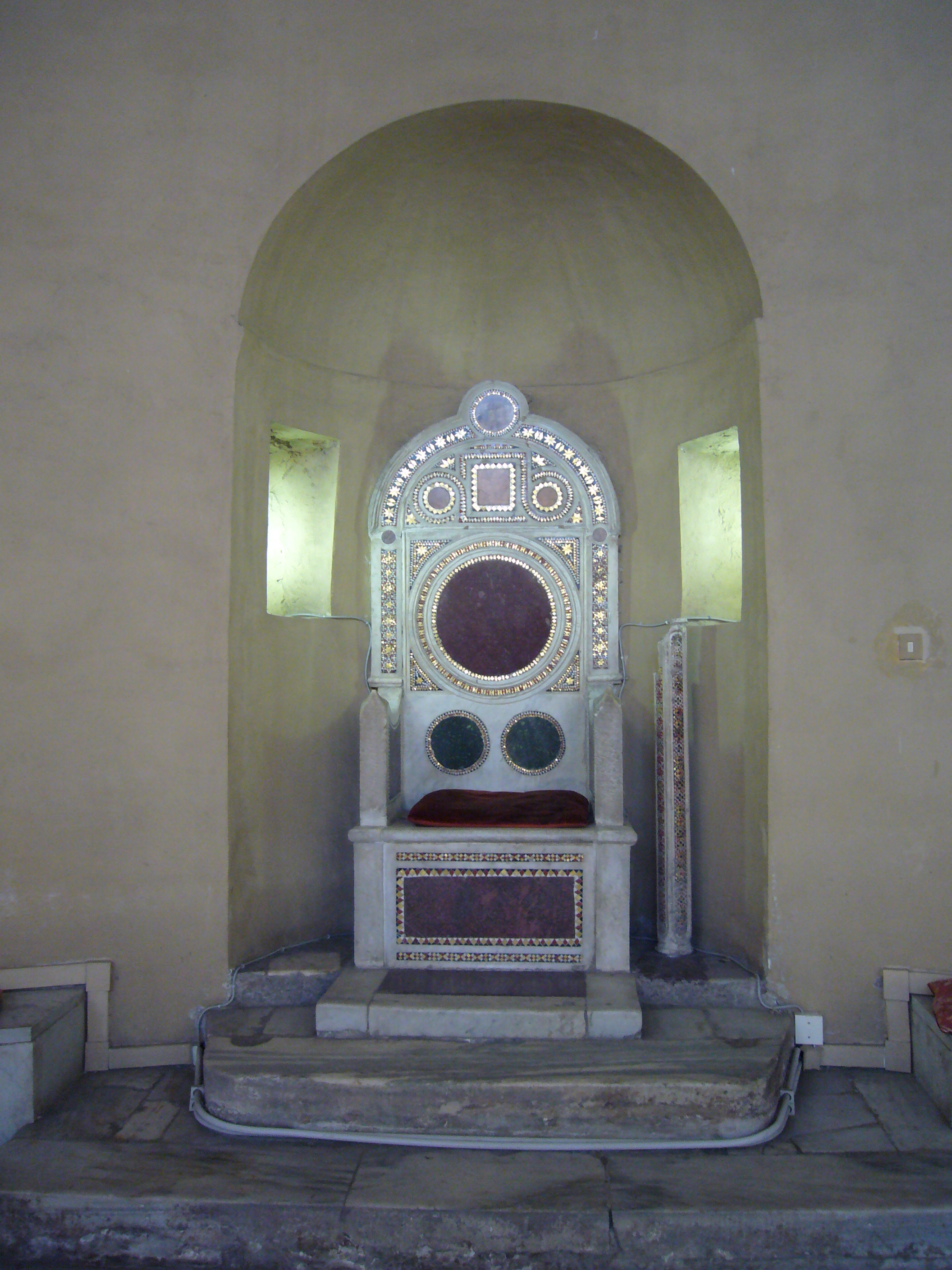
Bishop's Chair adorned in mosaic by the Cosmati - 13th century

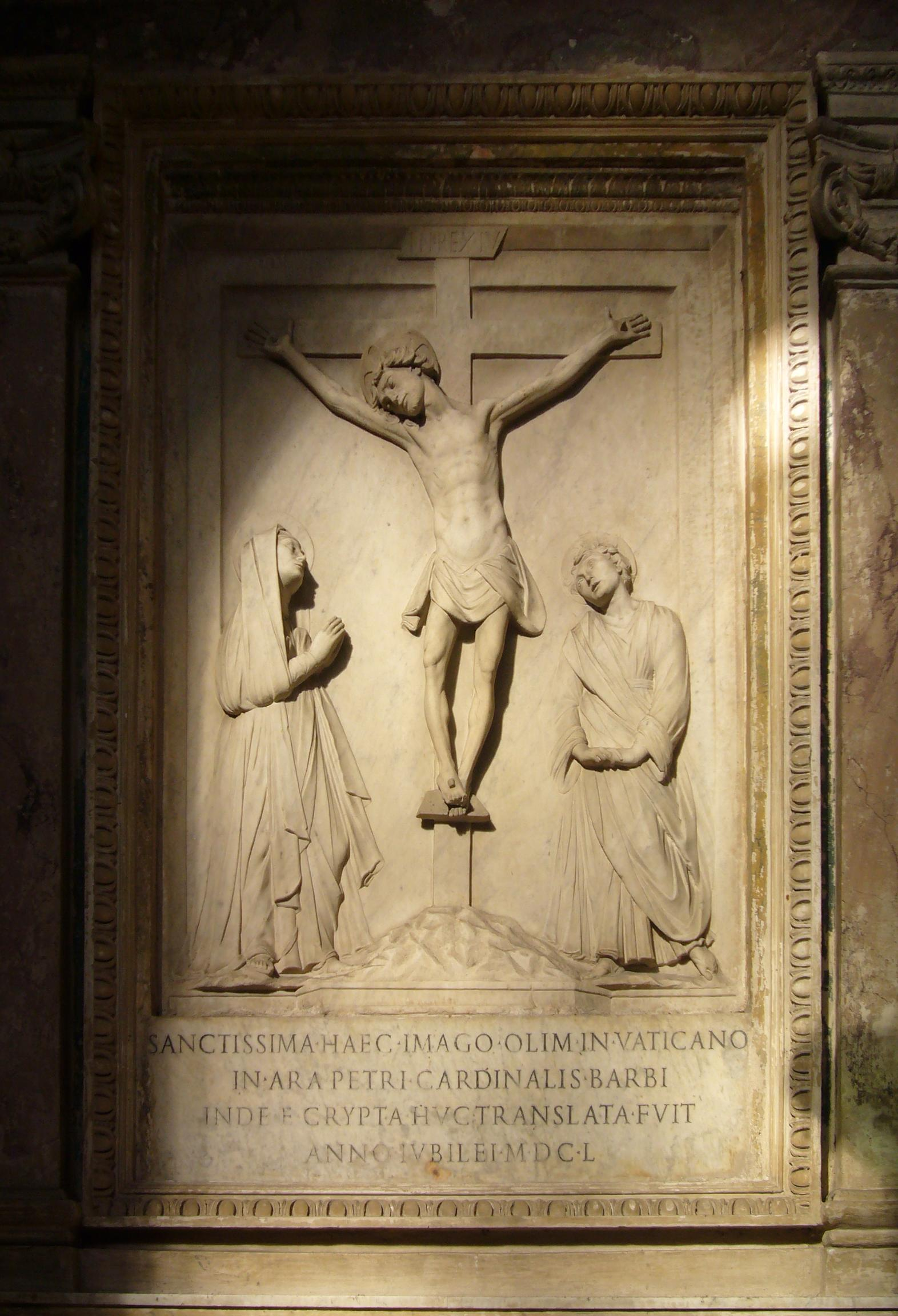
Crucifixion relief done for the tomb of Pope Paul II by Mino da Fiesole

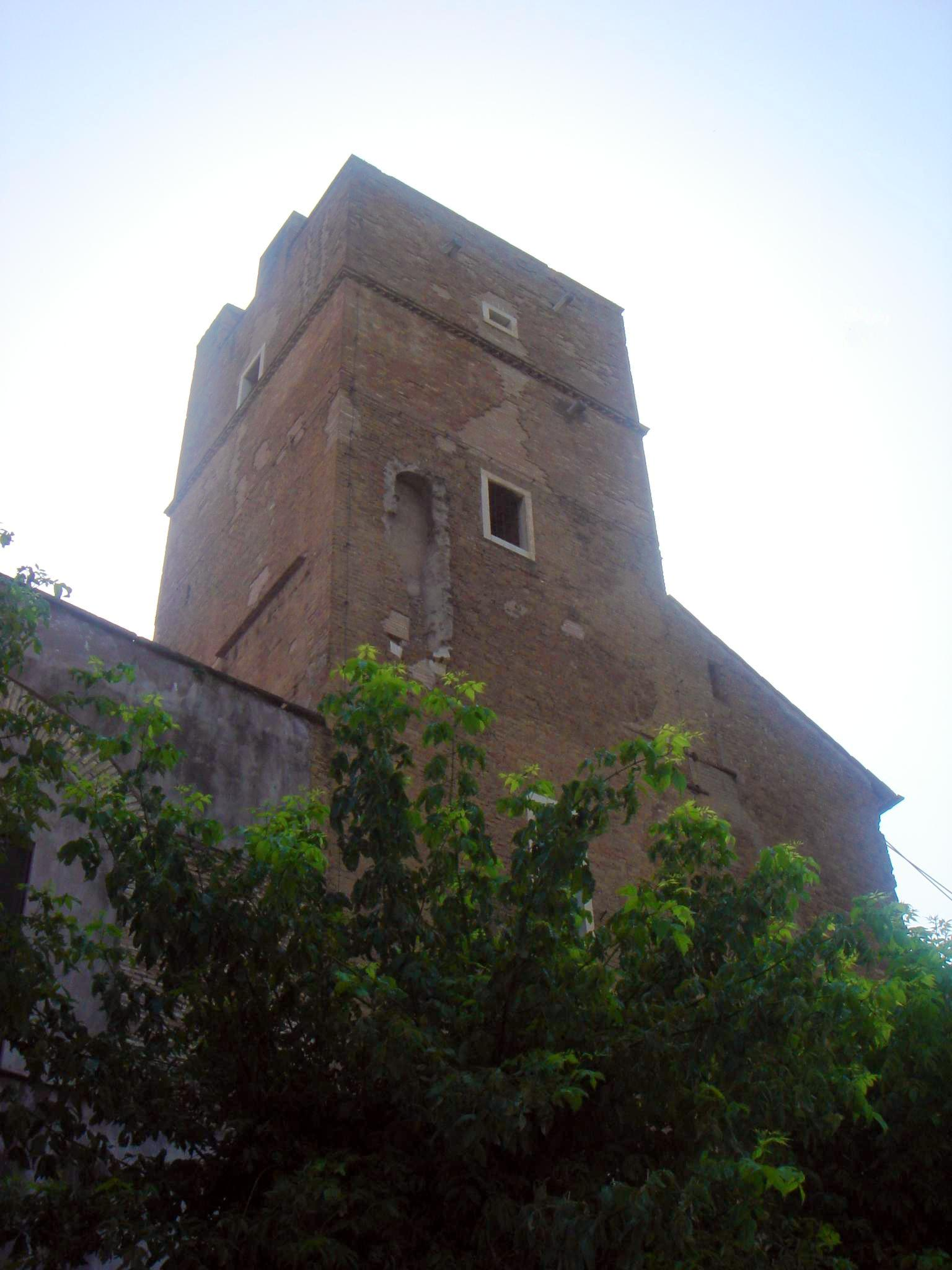
Fortified tower of the Santa Balbina Convent

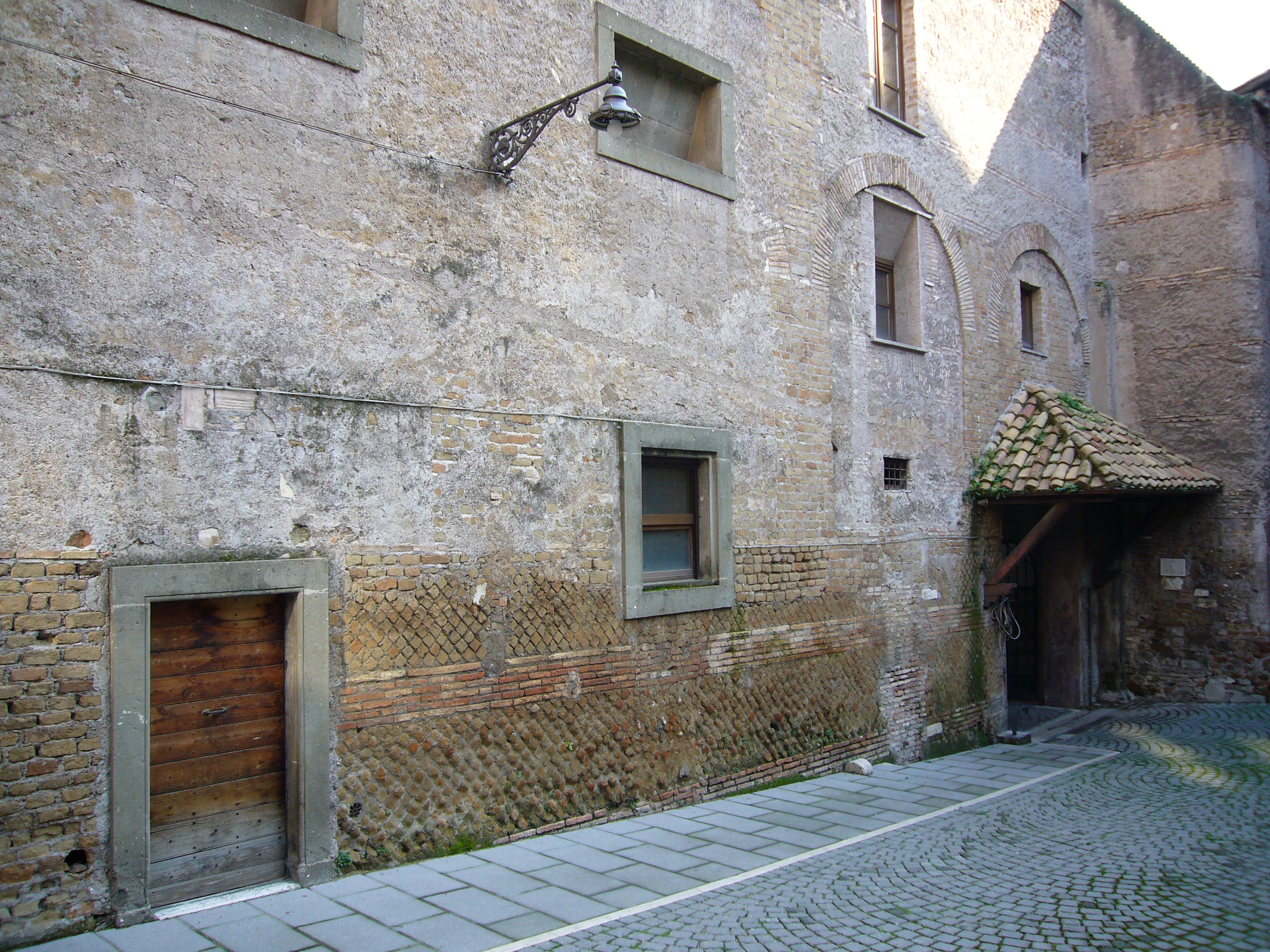
Opus listatum in the walls of the convent now called Santa Dorotea

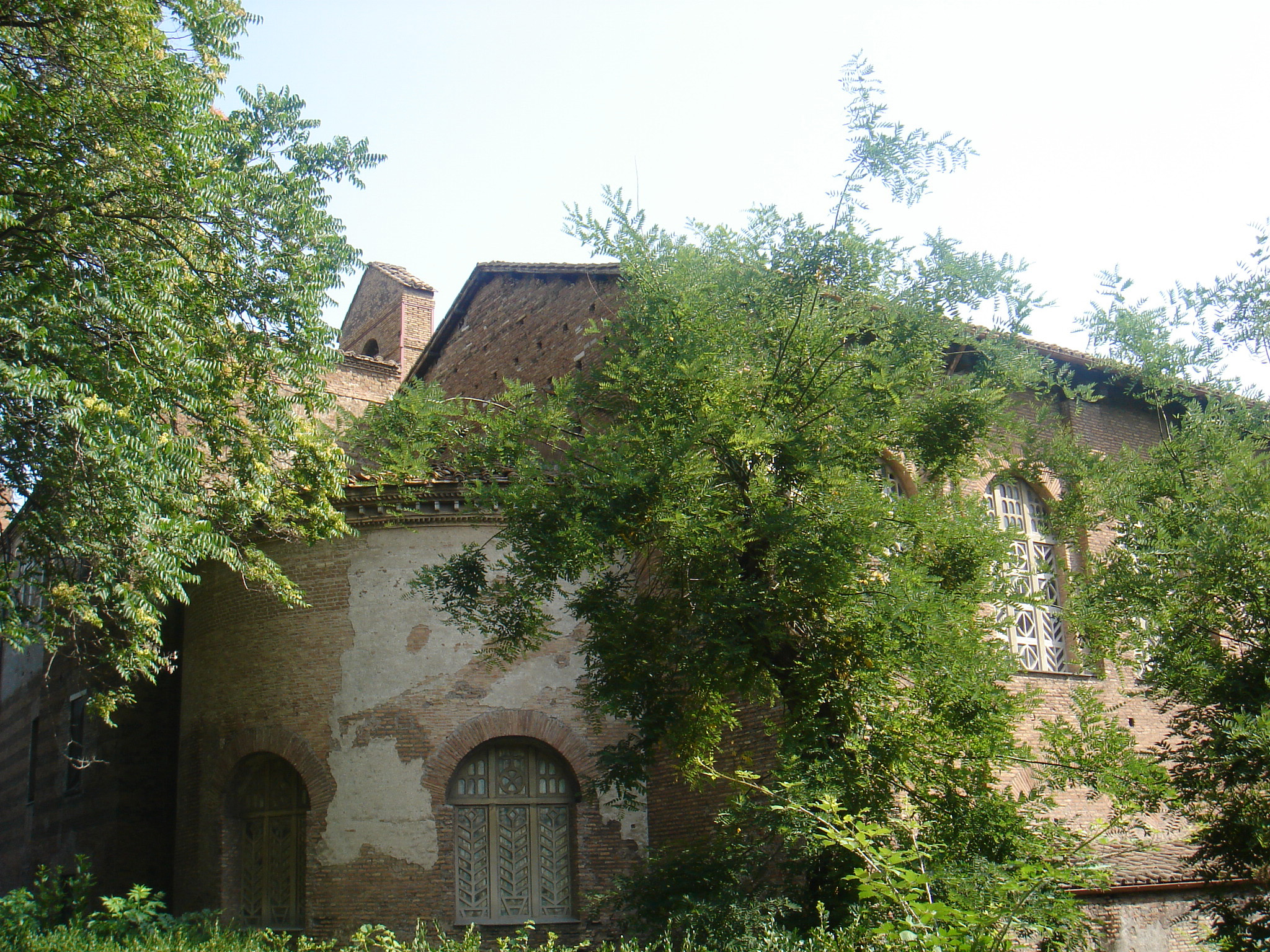
Santa Balbina Exterior

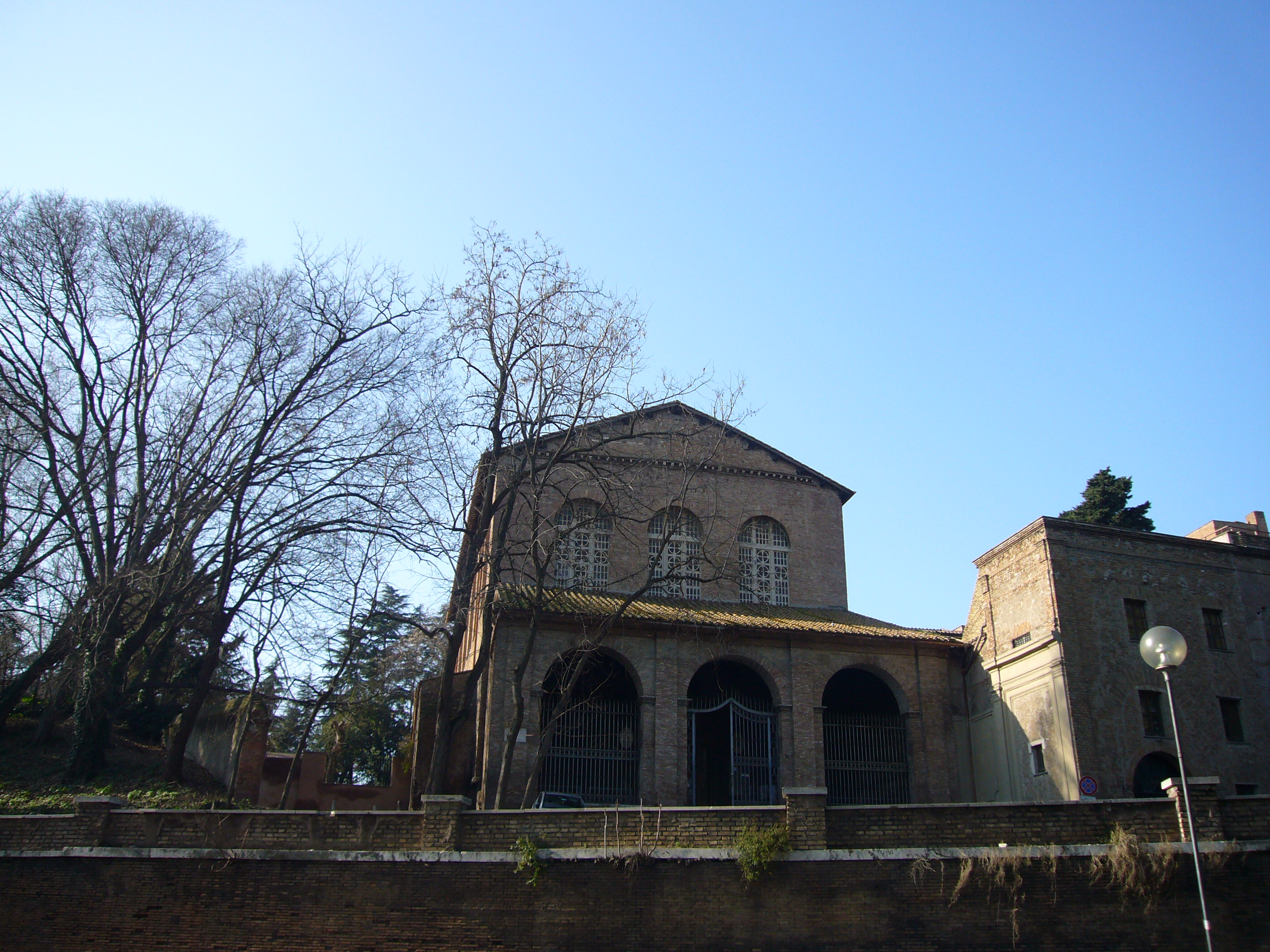
Santa Balbina, near the Baths of Caracalla

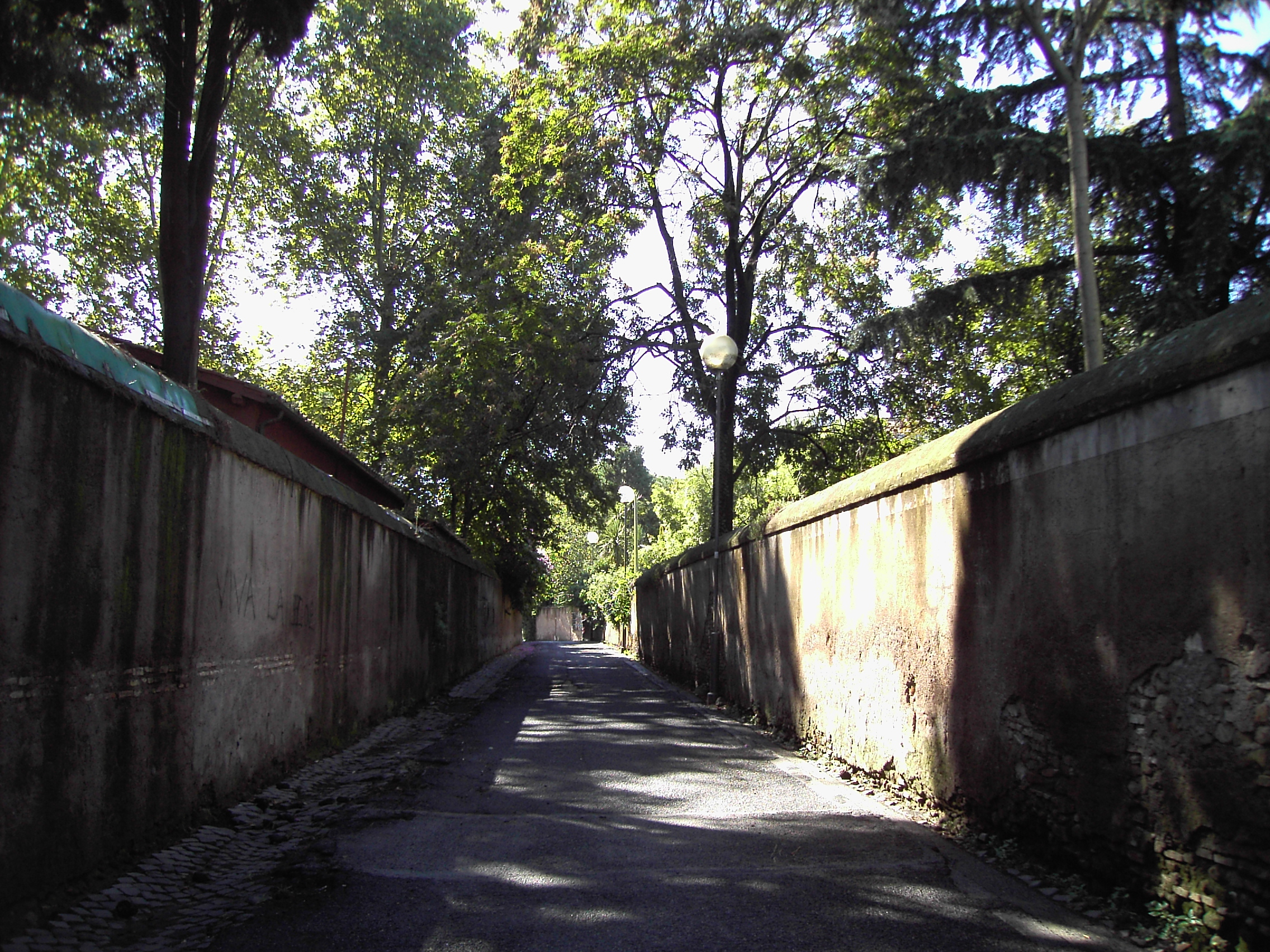
The way to Santa Balbina

== Bibliography ==
- Eubel, Conradus, ed. (1913). Hierarchia catholica (in Latin). Vol. Tomus 1 (second ed.). Münster: Libreria Regensbergiana.
- Eubel, Conradus, ed. (1914). Hierarchia catholica (in Latin). Vol. Tomus 2 (second ed.). Münster: Libreria Regensbergiana.
- Gulik, Guilelmus (1923). Eubel, Conradus (ed.). Hierarchia catholica (in Latin). Vol. Tomus 3 (second ed.). Münster: Libreria Regensbergiana.
- Gauchat, Patritius (Patrice) (1935). Hierarchia catholica (in Latin). Vol. Tomus IV (1592-1667). Münster: Libraria Regensbergiana.
- Ritzler, Remigius; Sefrin, Pirminus (1952). Hierarchia catholica medii et recentis aevi (in Latin). Vol. Tomus V (1667-1730). Patavii: Messagero di S. Antonio.
- Ritzler, Remigius; Sefrin, Pirminus (1958). Hierarchia catholica medii et recentis aevi. Vol. Tomus VI (1730-1799). Patavii: Messagero di S. Antonio.
- Ritzler, Remigius; Sefrin, Pirminus (1968). Hierarchia Catholica medii et recentioris aevi (in Latin). Vol. VII (1800–1846). Monasterii: Libreria Regensburgiana.
- Remigius Ritzler; Pirminus Sefrin (1978). Hierarchia catholica Medii et recentioris aevi (in Latin). Vol. VIII (1846–1903). Il Messaggero di S. Antonio.
- Hüls, Rudolf (1977). Kardinäle, Klerus und Kirchen Roms: 1049–1130 (in German). Bibliothek des Deutschen Historischen Instituts in Rom. ISBN 978-3-484-80071-7.

Preceded by Santi Apostoli, Rome	Landmarks of Rome; Santa Balbina	Succeeded by San Bartolomeo all'Isola
