= Regensburg Interim =

The Regensburg Interim, traditionally called in English the Interim of Ratisbon, was a temporary settlement in matters of religion, entered into by Emperor Charles V with the Protestants in 1541.

It was published at the conclusion on 29 July 1541 of the Imperial Diet known as the Diet of Ratisbon. It was based on the result of the previous conference between Roman Catholics and Protestants, in which an agreement had been reached on the idea of justification and other points of doctrine. Consequently the imperial "recess" enacted:

- that the adjustment of the religious question should be postponed until the next general council or imperial diet;
- that meanwhile the Protestants should not go beyond or against the articles agreed upon;
- that an ecclesiastical reform be inaugurated by the prelates;
- that the Nuremberg Religious Peace (1532) should be maintained;
- that monasteries and chapter-houses should remain intact;
- that the ecclesiastics should retain their possessions;
- that the Protestants should not draw anyone to their side;
- that all judicial proceedings in matters of religion should be suspended; that the imperial court of justice (Reichskammergericht) should remain as before;
- and that the recess of Augsburg (1530) should remain in force.

Owing to the opposition of the Protestants Charles V, in a secret declaration, made them concessions which practically nullified the recess. The articles agreed upon were to be accepted in the sense of their theologians; the monasteries and chapter-houses might be called on to inaugurate a reform; the ecclesiastics, monasteries, and chapter-houses, that had embraced the Confession of Augsburg, were to remain in the full possession of their property; the Protestants were not to compel the subjects of Catholic princes to embrace their faith, but if anyone came to them spontaneously, he was not to be hindered; the members of the imperial court of justice were not to be molested, if they turned Protestants; and the recess of Augsburg was to have force only in matters not appertaining to religion.

== See also ==
- Augsburg Interim (1548)
- Leipzig Interim (1548)
