= Diet of Regensburg (1541) =

Holy Roman conference on Protestant-Catholic unity

The Colloquy of Regensburg, historically called the Colloquy of Ratisbon, was a conference held at Regensburg (Ratisbon) in Bavaria in 1541, during the Protestant Reformation, which marks the culmination of attempts to restore religious unity in the Holy Roman Empire by means of theological debate between the Protestants and the Catholics.

== Background ==
Delegates from the various factions had met at Haguenau in 1540 and at Worms in January 1541 but the latter session of the Imperial Diet was adjourned by the Emperor Charles V as the Diet was preparing to meet at Regensburg. The subject for debate was to be the Augsburg Confession, the primary doctrinal statement of the Lutheran movement, and the Apology of the Augsburg Confession, a defense of the Confession written by Philipp Melanchthon.

On 15 December 1540 a secret conference took place between Johann Gropper, canon of Cologne, and Gerhard Veltwick, the Imperial secretary, on the one side and Butzer and Capito, the delegates of Protestant Strasbourg, on the other. The two sides agreed their positions on original sin and justification, but the promise made by the Catholic party at Haguenau, to negotiate on the basis of the Confession and Apology, was withdrawn.

Early in 1541, Butzer sent a draft of the conclusions to Joachim II, Elector of Brandenburg, with the request to communicate it to Luther and the other princes of the Protestant league. The document was essentially identical with the later so-called Regensburg Book, which formed the basis of the Regensburg Conference in place of the Augsburg Confession.

It was divided into twenty-three articles, some of which closely approached the Protestant view; but it decided no questions of dogma and did not exclude the Catholic positions. On 13 February 1541 the book reached the hands of Luther. In spite of the apparent concessions made in regard to the doctrine of justification, he perceived that the proposed articles of agreement could be accepted by neither party.

== The Colloquy ==
On 23 February 1541 the Emperor entered Regensburg. In consideration of his difficult political situation, especially of the threatened war with the Ottoman Turks and the negotiations of the French king with the Protestants in his country, it was his desire to pacify Germany. The conference was opened on 5 April. The negotiators were Gropper, Pflug, and Eck on the Catholic side, under the oversight of the Papal Legate Cardinal Contarini; Bucer, the elder Johannes Pistorius, and Melanchthon for the Protestants. Besides the presidents, Count Palatine Frederick and Granvella, six witnesses were present, among them Burkhardt and Feige, chancellors of Saxony and Hesse respectively, and Jakob Sturm of Strasbourg.

The first four articles, on the condition and integrity of man before the fall, on free will, on the cause of sin, and on original sin, passed without difficulty. The article on justification encountered great opposition, especially from Eck, but an agreement was finally arrived at; neither Elector John Frederick nor Luther were satisfied with this article. With respect to the articles on the doctrinal authority of the Church, the hierarchy, discipline, sacraments, etc., no agreement was possible, and they were all passed over without result. On 31 May the book, with the changes agreed upon and nine counter-propositions of the Protestants, was returned to the Emperor. In spite of the opposition of Mainz, Bavaria, and the Imperial legate, Charles V still hoped for an agreement on the basis of the articles which had been accepted by both parties, those in which they differed being postponed to a later time.

As it was perceived that all negotiations would be in vain if the consent of Luther were not obtained, a deputation headed by John of Anhalt arrived at Wittenberg, where Luther resided, on 9 June. Luther answered in a polite and almost diplomatic way. He expressed satisfaction in reference to the agreement on some of the articles, but did not believe in the sincerity of his opponents and made his consent dependent upon conditions which he knew could not be accepted by the Roman Catholics.

Before the deputation had returned from Wittenberg, the Roman party had entirely destroyed all hope of union. The formula of justification, which Contarini had sent to Rome, was rejected by a papal consistory. Rome declared that the matter could be settled only at a council, and this opinion was shared by the stricter party among the estates. Albert of Mainz urged the Emperor to take up arms against the Protestants. Charles V tried in vain to induce the Protestants to accept the disputed articles, while Joachim of Brandenburg made new attempts to bring about an agreement. With every day the gulf between the opposing parties became wider, and both of them, even the Roman Catholics, showed a disposition to ally themselves with France against the Emperor.

Pope Paul III addresses the mighty Emperor of Germany, and we may properly say that Calvin, though indirectly, does the same. This strange colloquy is well worth the trouble of listening to it. The Pope:"We are desirous of the peace and the unity of Germany; but of a peace and a unity which do not constitute a perpetual war against God." Calvin:"That is to say, against the earthly god, the Roman god. For if he (the pope) wished for peace with the true God, he would live in a different manner; he would teach otherwise and reign otherwise than he does. For his whole existence, his institutions, and his decrees make war on God." The Pope: "The Protestants are like slippery snakes; they aim at no certain object, and thus show plainly enough that they are altogether enemies of concord, and want, not the suppression of vice but the overthrow of the apostolic see! We ought not to have any further negotiations with them." Calvin: "Certainly, there is a snake in the grass here. The pope, who holds in abomination all discussion, cannot hear it spoken of without immediately crying 'Fire!' in order to prevent it. Only let anyone call to mind all the little assemblies held by the pontiffs these twenty years and more, for the purpose of smothering the Gospel, and then he will see clearly what kind of a reformation they would be willing to accept. All men of sound mind see clearly the question is not only of maintaining the status of the pope as a sovereign and limited episcopacy, but rather of completely setting aside the episcopal office and of establishing in its stead and under its name an anti-Christian tyranny. And not only so, but the adherents of the papacy put men out of their minds by wicked and impious lies, and corrupt the world by numberless examples of debauchery. Not contented with these misdeeds, they exterminate those who strive to restore to the Church a purer doctrine and a more lawful order, or who merely venture to ask for these things.

— The History of the Reformation in the Time of Calvin, by J. H. Merle d'Aubigne, Vol. 7, 1877, ch. "CHAPTER XX. CALVIN AT RATISBON. (1541.)"

== Outcome of the Conference ==
Thus the fate of the Regensburg Book was no longer doubtful. After Elector John Frederick and Luther had become fully acquainted with its contents, their disinclination was confirmed, and Luther demanded most decidedly that even the articles agreed upon should be rejected. On 5 July the estates rejected the Emperor's efforts for union. They demanded an investigation of the articles agreed upon, and that in case of necessity they should be amended and explained by the Papal legate. Moreover, the Protestants were to be compelled to accept the disputed articles; in case of their refusal a general or national council was to be convoked. Contarini received instructions to announce to the Emperor that all settlement of religious and ecclesiastical questions should be left to the Pope. Thus the whole effort for union was frustrated, even before the Protestant estates declared that they insisted upon their counterproposals in regard to the disputed articles.

The supposed results of the religious conference were to be laid before a general or national council or before an assembly of the Empire which was to be convoked within eighteen months. In the meantime the Protestants were bound to the Regensburg Interim, enacted by Charles V, to ensure that they adhere to the articles agreed upon, not to publish anything on them, and not to abolish any churches or monasteries, while the prelates were requested to reform their clergy at the order of the legate. The peace of Nuremberg was to extend until the time of the future council, but the Augsburg Recess was to be maintained.

These decisions might have become very dangerous to the Protestants, and in order not to force them into an alliance with his foreign opponents, the Emperor decided to change some of the resolutions in their favor; but the Roman Catholics did not acknowledge his declaration. As he was not willing to expose himself to an intervention on their part, he left Regensburg on 29 June, without having obtained either an agreement or a humiliation of the Protestants, and the Roman party now looked upon him with greater mistrust than the Protestants.

== See also ==
- Regensburg Interim
