= Balbina of Rome =

2nd century Christian female saint

Saint Balbina
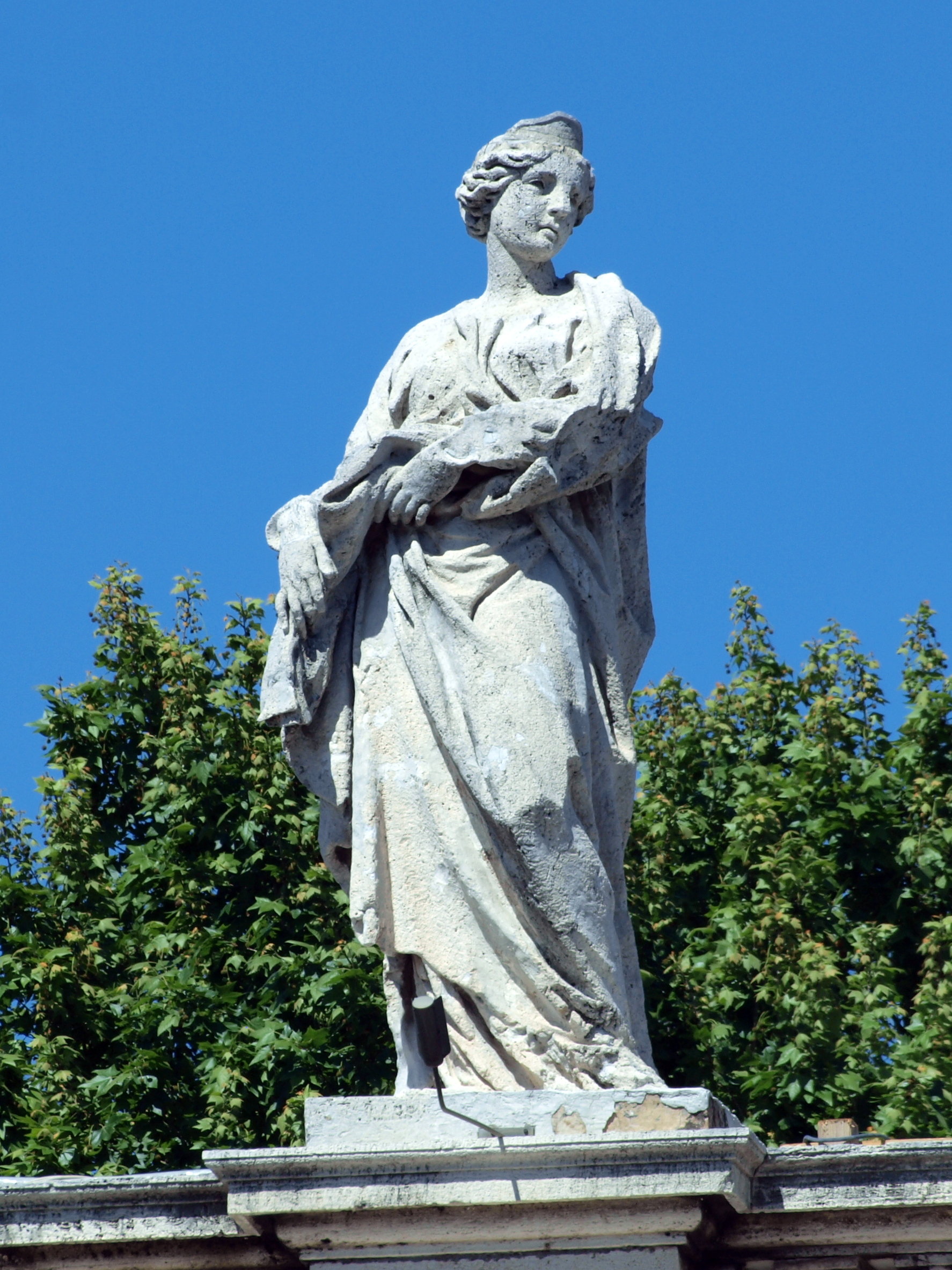
- Statue of Saint Balbina, one of the 140 statues on the colonnade of St. Peter's Square.
- Born: unknown
- Died: c. 130 CE; Rome, Italy
- Venerated in: Catholic Church; Eastern Orthodox Church
- Major shrine: Santa Balbina
- Feast: 31 March
- Attributes: Chains; Fetters; Young woman holding a chain; Young woman kissing the chains of captive Christians
- Patronage: Struma, Scrofulous Diseases, Goiter, Throat Diseases

Balbina of Rome (Latin: bahl-BEE-nə), sometimes called Saint Balbina and Balbina the Virgin is venerated as a virgin martyr and saint of the Catholic Church.

== Legend ==
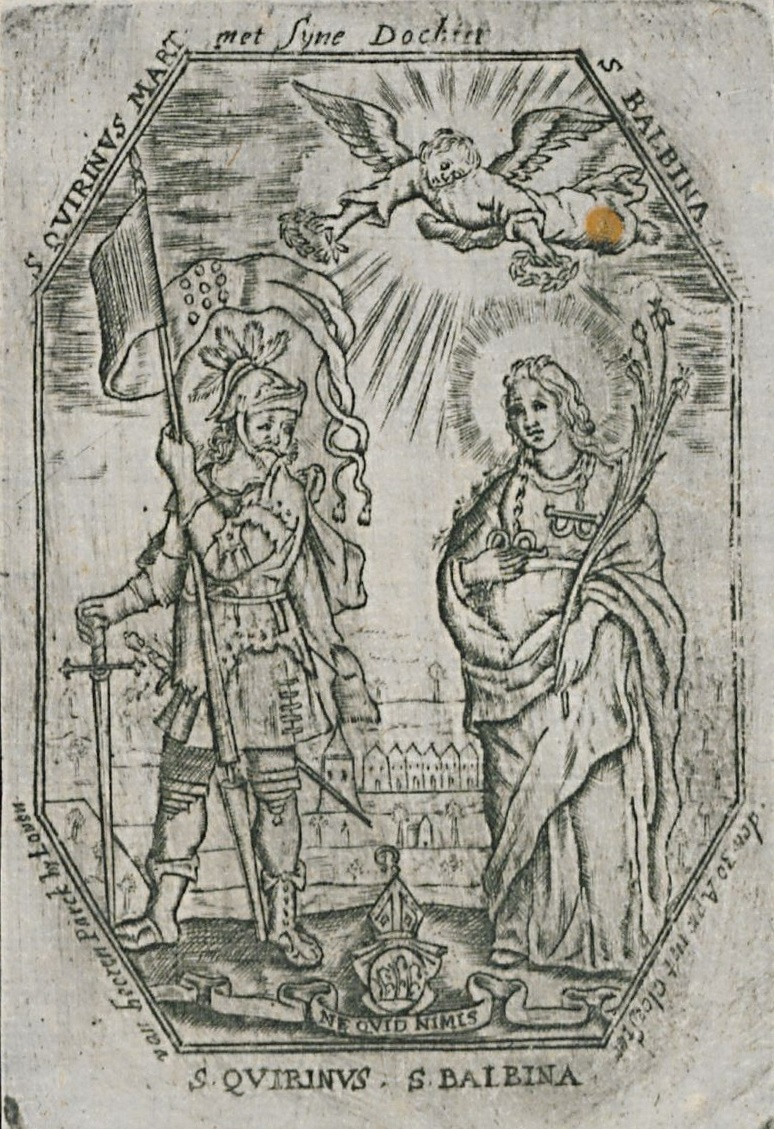
Saint Balbina and Saint Quirinus of Neuss, from an 18th-century print.

The story of Balbina is introduced in the legendary Acts of Sts. Alexander and Balbina, where it is said that she was the daughter of Quirinus, a Tribune in the Roman Army. Usuardus speaks of her in his martyrology; his account of Balbina rests on the record of the martyrdom of Alexander I.

Legend has it that Quirinus was ordered to hold Pope Alexander I and a man named Hermes in prison because of their Christian faith. They were held in separate prisons that were a great distance apart, and both were shackled and well-guarded. Quirinus was trying to convert Hermes back to the old gods, but promised to become a Christian if Hermes could prove that there was an afterlife. Hermes explained that Pope Alexander could make a better argument than he, and asked several times to visit his prison. At first, Quirinus agreed to this, but after a while he became angry, convinced that these visits were frivolous excursions. He tightened the guard so that the two would not be able to speak with one another. That night Hermes prayed, and an angel appeared to Pope Alexander, releasing his chains and bringing him to Hermes' prison cell.

The next morning Quirinus came to Hermes' cell as usual, and he was shocked to find both men inside. His heart now open to what the two Christians had to say, he stayed and talked with the men for a while. Hermes shared his story and told of how the Pope with the help of God had raised his son from the dead. Hearing this, Quirinus said that his daughter Balbina had a large goitre, and if the Pope could heal her, he would believe and become a Christian. The Pope asked him to bring her to the prison where he was held originally. "How can she find you there, when you're here with Hermes?" Quirinus asked. "He who brought me here, will also bring me back", replied the Pope. So Quirinus quickly returned home and brought his daughter to the prison where he had originally locked up Pope Alexander. There, they found Alexander patiently waiting for them, tightly shackled in the way he had been before. Seeing this, they knelt before him in reverence.

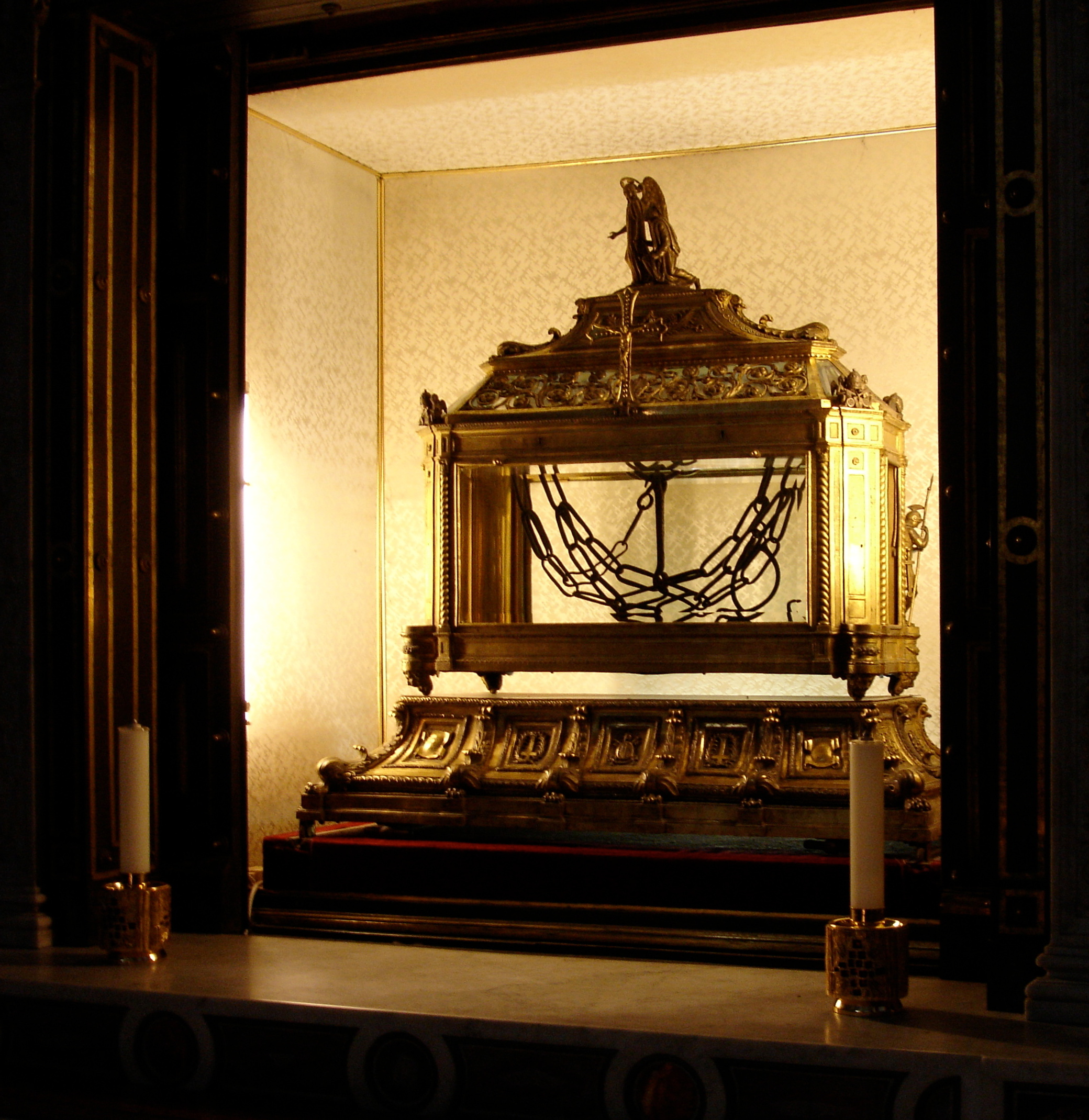
Reliquary containing the chains of St. Peter in St. Peter in Chains in Rome, Italy

Full of devotion, Balbina started to kiss the links of the chains that the Pope was attached to. But he said to her: "You shall not kiss these chains, but go out and find St. Peter's chains. Once you've found them, kiss them with devotion and you will soon be well."

Knowing where Peter had been held before his martyrdom, Quirinus jumped up immediately and took Balbina with him, and there he found the chains. Balbina kissed them and was soon well. Quirinus immediately had Pope Alexander and Hermes pardoned and released. Along with his wife and daughter, he was baptised by the Pope. Pope Alexander stipulated that the miracle of the chains should be celebrated from that day forward, and he built the church of the Apostle Peter, where the chains have been held ever since. The church he called "ad Vincula" ("in chains"), is today St. Peter in Chains.

Another account has Quirinus placed as the one ordered to execute Alexander and two others, Eventius, and Theodolus, who had been arrested by order of Trajan. Quirinus converted to Christianity, however, after witnessing miracles performed by these three saints, and he was baptised along with his wife, and daughter Balbina.

In both accounts, Quirinus was then arrested as a Christian, and martyred through decapitation on 30 March 116. He was buried in the catacomb of Prætextatus on the Via Appia. His grave was later regarded with great veneration and is referred to in the old itineraries (guides for pilgrims) of the Roman catacombs.

It is not fully known what happened to Balbina after the death of her father, but some accounts list her as living as a virgin recluse nun until her death in 130.

== Death ==
The general consensus is that in 130, Balbina was found guilty of being a Christian and sentenced to death by Emperor Hadrian. Whether she was drowned or buried alive is a matter of dispute.

In an alternative account, Balbina was arrested along with her father in 116, and beheaded in the same manner.

After Balbina’s death, she was buried next to her father in the catacomb of Praetextatus on the Via Appia. At a later date, the bones and relics of Quirinus and Balbina were brought to the church, built in her honour in the 4th century.

== Veneration ==
- St. Balbina is honoured as one of the 140 saints atop the colonnade of St. Peter's Square.
- Some of her relics were brought to Cologne Cathedral during the Middle Ages, most likely around the same time that Quirinus' body was donated in 1050 by Pope Leo IX to an abbess of Neuss named Gepa (who is called a sister of the pope).
- The majority of her relics are said to still be in the altar of Santa Balbina.
- At some point in the late 15th or early 16th century, Balbina's skull was removed from her body and placed inside an ornate reliquary. This reliquary now resides in the Metropolitan Museum of Art in New York City.

== Basilica of Santa Balbina ==
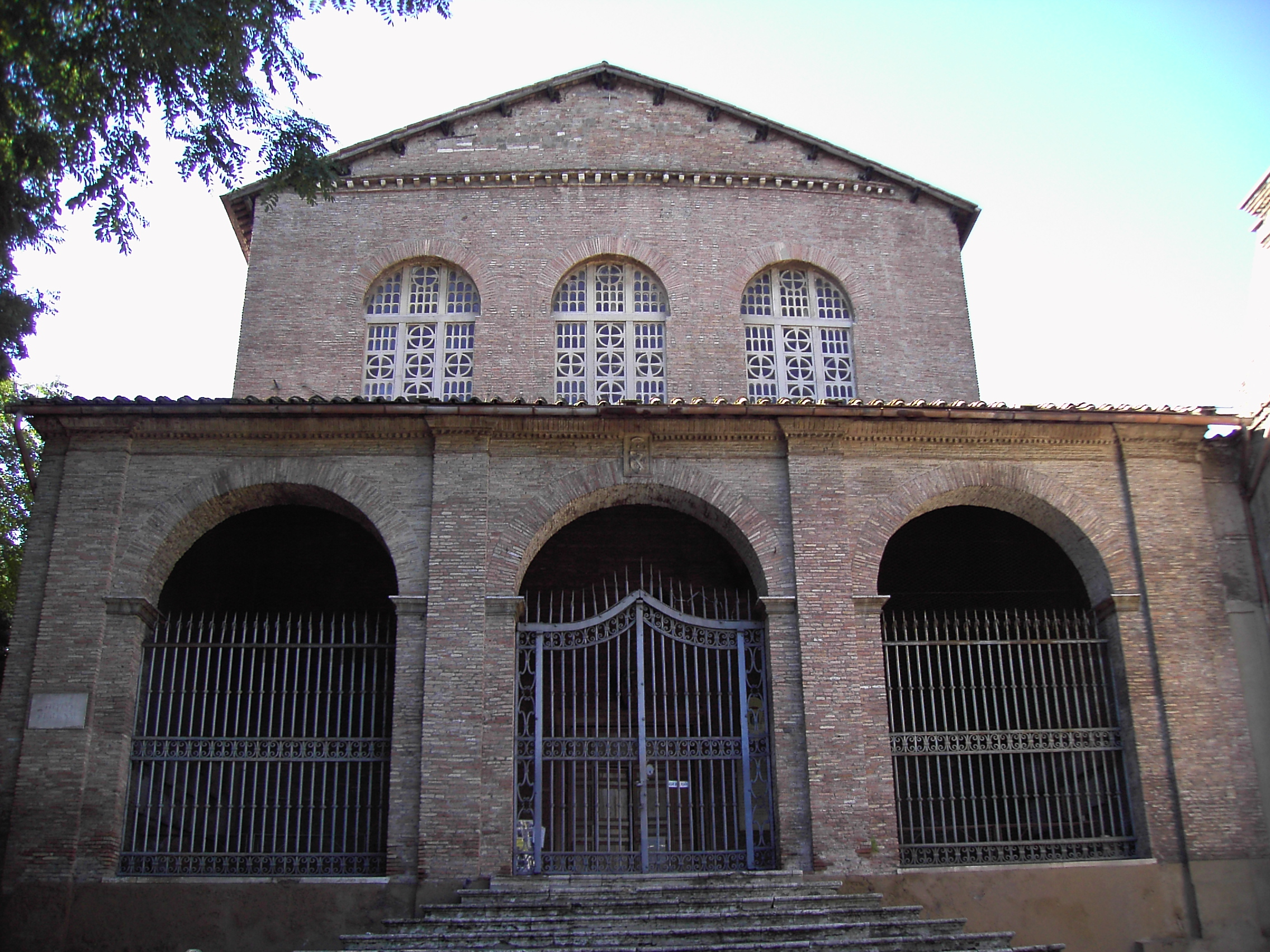
Santa Balbina Basilica in Rome

Santa Balbina is a basilica church in Rome, devoted to St. Balbina. It was built in the 4th century over the house of consul Lucius Fabius Cilo on the Aventine Hill, behind the Baths of Caracalla.

The site should not be confused with a catacomb named after Balbina (coem. Balbinae) which lay between the Via Appia and the Via Ardeatina not far from the little church called Domine quo vadis. Over this cemetery, another, now lost basilica was erected in the fourth century by Pope Mark.

Tradition has it that it was at this church that the Emperor Constantine bade farewell to the Pope on his departure for Constantinople.
