= Giovanni Castiglione (cardinal) =

Italian Roman Catholic bishop and cardinal

Giovanni Castiglione (1420–1460) was an Italian Roman Catholic bishop and cardinal.

== Biography ==
Giovanni Castiglione was born in Milan in 1420, the son of Palatine Count Maffiolo Castiglione and Angela Lampugnani. His family was of the patrician rank.

After studying civil law, Castiglione became a protonotary apostolic, gaining a reputation as a great canonist and sacred orator. Pope Eugene IV named him a secretary apostolic.

On 2 September 1444 the cathedral chapter of Coutances Cathedral elected him Bishop of Coutances. In 1447, he was named papal legate to the Kingdom of England. He was transferred to the see of Pavia on 3 October 1453. He served as the papal legate of Pope Nicholas V and Pope Callixtus III to Germany, in which capacity he was present at the Diet of Regensburg of April 1454 and the Diet of Frankfurt of October 1454. At these two diets, his main goal was to promote war with the Ottoman Empire, which had recently captured Constantinople, the capital of the Byzantine Empire. On 8 September 1455 he was present in St Mark's Basilica in Venice for the ceremony of the departure of the Crusade. In 1456, he served as legate to Frederick III, Holy Roman Emperor.

At the request of Francesco I Sforza, Pope Callixtus III made Castiglione a cardinal in the consistory of 17 December 1456. Castiglione entered Rome on 23 February 1457, received the red hat in the public consistory of 24 February 1457 and received the titular church of San Clemente on 9 March 1457.

Cardinal Castiglione participated in the papal conclave of 1458 that elected Pope Pius II. Pius named Castiglione legate a latere to the March of Ancona, and Castiglione left Rome on this assignment in September 1458. He occupied this post until his death. He also became commendatory abbot of the Basilica of Sant'Abbondio in 1458.

Castiglione died in Macerata on 14 April 1460. He is buried in his family tomb in Milan.
