= Alessandro Campeggio =

Italian Roman Catholic bishop and cardinal

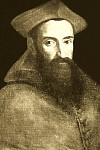
Bishop Alessandro Campeggio Portrait

Alessandro Campeggio (12 April 1504 – 21 September 1554) was an Italian Roman Catholic bishop and cardinal.

== Biography ==
Alessandro Campeggio was born in Bologna on 12 April 1504, the son of Lorenzo Campeggio and Francesca Guastavillani. His father was married and had five children, but after the death of Francesca, he entered the ecclesiastical estate and himself became a cardinal. Educated at home, Alessandro Campeggio studied Italian letters, Latin, Ancient Greek, philosophy, and Christian theology.

He was elected Bishop of Bologna on 19 March 1526. He was constituted administrated administrator of the diocese until he reached the canonical age of 27. Upon reaching the canonical age, he delayed receiving episcopal consecration, receiving an prorogation on 11 December 1529, again on 24 August 1539 and again on 10 April 1540. On 19 July 1541 he was finally granted license to receive Holy Orders. As such, he was ordained as a priest and consecrated as a bishop on 31 July 1541 in the church of San Michele in Bosco in Bologna.

On 15 October 1541 he was nominated to be vice-legate in Avignon. As such, he arrived in Carpentras on 10 November 1542 and remained there until 1544. On 14 August 1544 he was appointed a cleric of the Apostolic Camera. When the Council of Trent was moved from Trent to Bologna, he hosted the conciliar fathers in his own palace from 12 March 1547 until 10 November 1549.

Pope Julius III made him a cardinal priest in the consistory of 20 November 1551. He received the red hat and the titular church of Santa Lucia in Selci, a deaconry raised pro illa vice to the status of titulus, on 4 December 1551. He resigned the government of the Diocese of Bologna in favor of his cousin Giovanni Campeggio on 6 March 1553.

He died in Rome on 21 September 1554. He was buried in his father's tomb in Santa Maria in Trastevere.
