= Santa Maria Incoronata, Milan =

Church in Milan, Italy

Coordinates: 45°28′46″N 9°11′12″E

Church of the Coronation of Saint Mary (Chiesa di Santa Maria Incoronata)
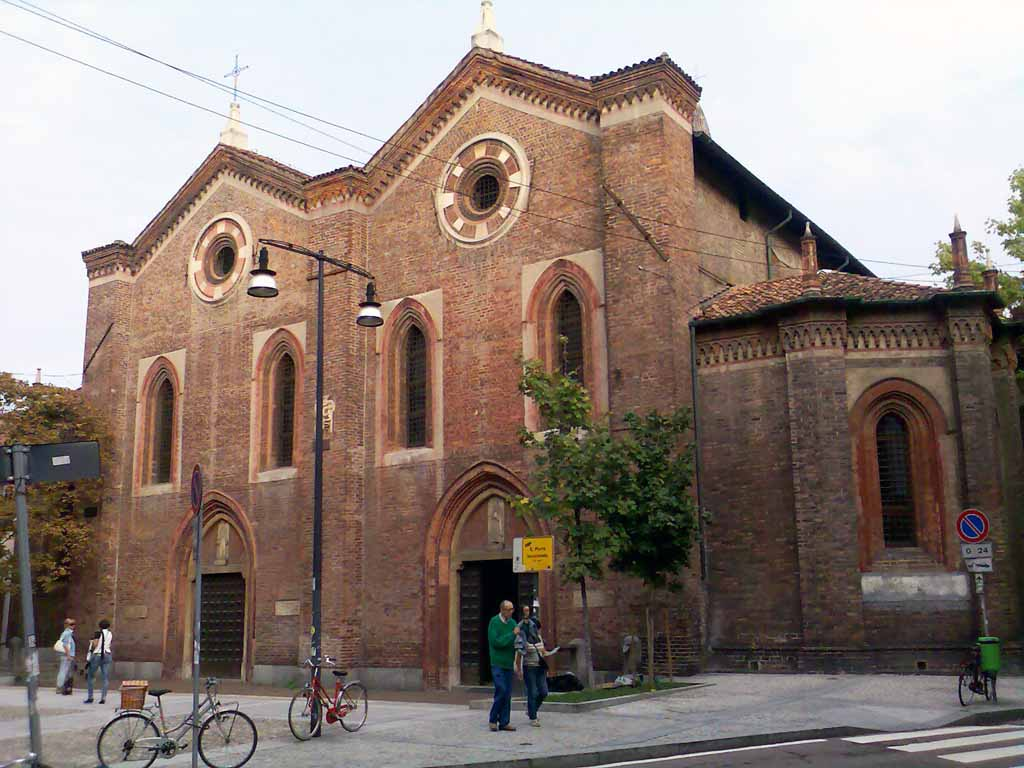
- Double façade of the church.

Religion
- Affiliation: Roman Catholic
- Province: Milan
- Year consecrated: 14th century
- Status: Active

Location
- Location: Milan, Italy
- Interactive map of Church of the Coronation of Saint Mary (Chiesa di Santa Maria Incoronata)

Architecture
- Type: Church
- Style: Late Gothic
- Groundbreaking: 1450
- Completed: 1460

The Church of Santa Maria Incoronata (Italian: Chiesa di Santa Maria Incoronata), also known as the Church of the Coronation of Saint Mary, is a church in Milan, Italy, completed in 1460.

Artworks in the interior include a painting by Bergognone, Christ under the Grill; the tomb of Giovanni Bossi, attributed to Bambaia; a Baroque fresco cycle of the Life of St. Nicholas of Tolentino by Ciro Ferrari; and the Biblioteca Umanistica ("Humanist Library", 15th century). The latter has three naves divided by granite columns, with frescoes of the Magisteri Sacrae Pagines commissioned by the Augustinians when they acquired the building. Of the original gardens and cloisters, only one of the latter has survived.

== History ==
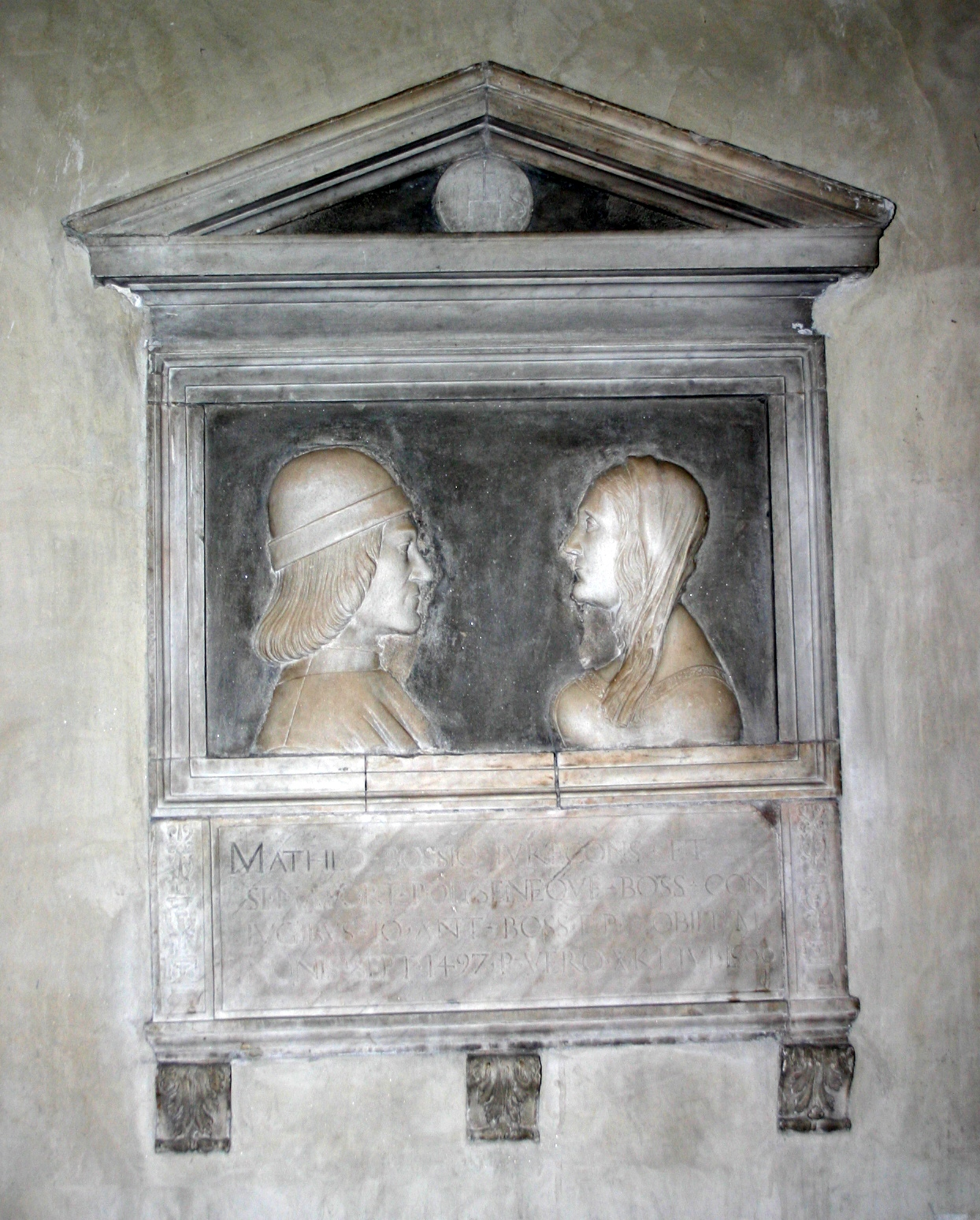
Grave for Matteo Bossi (died 1500) and his wife Polissena Bossi

Two paired buildings form the church. The oldest existed as early as the communal age and was dedicated to St. Maria di Gargnano. Starting from 1400, a new convent was annexed to it for the Augustinians, who had the structure restored in late Gothic style. The new church was completed in the same age as the election of Francesco Sforza as duke of Milan 1451, and received the current name (meaning "St. Mary Encrowned") on that occasion. In 1460, the duke's wife, Bianca Maria Visconti, commissioned the construction of a new church next to the oldest one, identical and connected to it, in order to create a single, larger edifice.

The church was modified in 1654 and 1827, but was restored to the medieval appearance in the early 19th century.
