= List of extant papal tombs =

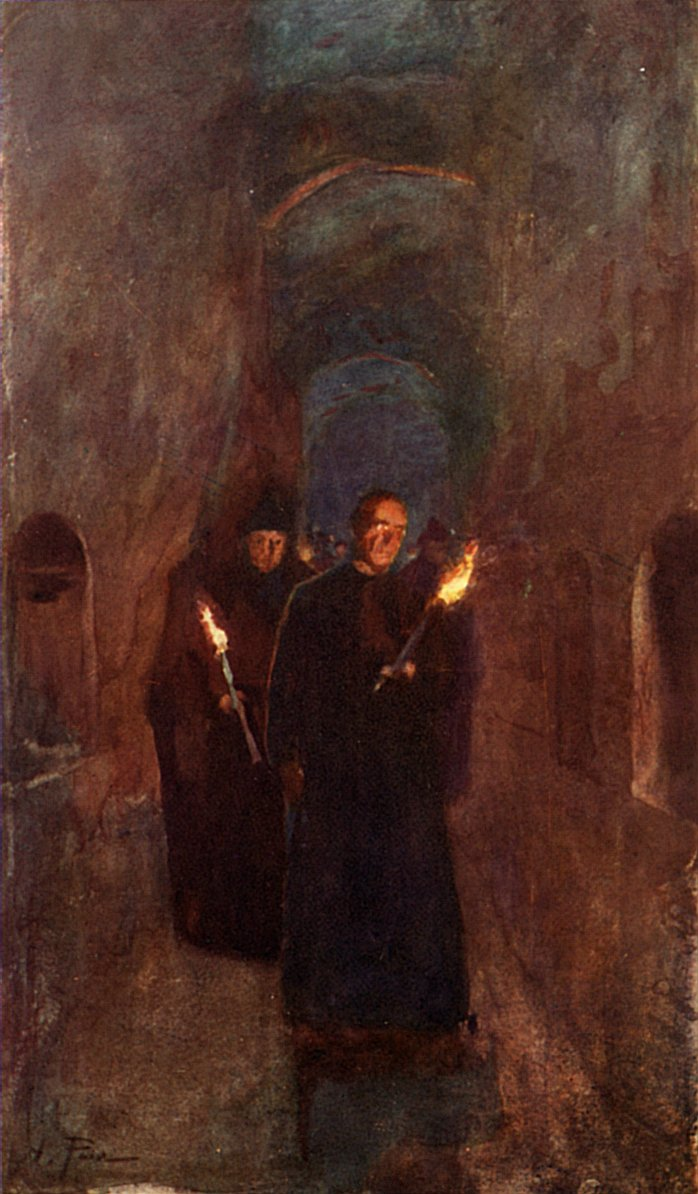
A procession in the Catacomb of Callixtus, a site of several ancient papal tombs. By Alberto Pisa, 1905

A pope is the Bishop of Rome and the leader of the Catholic Church. Approximately 100 papal tombs are at least partially extant, representing fewer than half of the 266 deceased popes, from Saint Peter to Pope Francis.

For the first few centuries in particular, little is known of the popes and their tombs, and available information is often contradictory. As with other religious relics, multiple sites claim to house the same tomb. Furthermore, many papal tombs that recycled sarcophagi and other materials from earlier tombs were later recycled for their valuable materials or combined with other monuments. For example, the tomb of Pope Leo I was combined with Leos II, III, and IV circa 855, and then removed in the seventeenth century and placed under his own altar, below Alessandro Algardi's relief, Fuga d'Attila. The style of papal tombs has evolved considerably throughout history, tracking trends in the development of church monuments. Notable papal tombs have been commissioned from sculptors such as Michelangelo and Gian Lorenzo Bernini.

Most extant papal tombs are located in St. Peter's Basilica in Vatican City, other major churches of Rome (especially Archbasilica of Saint John Lateran, Santa Maria sopra Minerva and Basilica di Santa Maria Maggiore), or other churches of Italy, France, and Germany.

== Note on non-extant tombs ==
Many early tombs no longer exist due to repeated translations or destruction. This list does not include non-extant papal tombs. Information about these tombs is generally incomplete and uncertain. Locations of destroyed or lost papal tombs include:

- Saint Peter's tomb, around which the following popes were traditionally believed to have been buried: Pope Linus, Pope Anacletus, Pope Evaristus, Pope Telesphorus, Pope Hyginus, Pope Pius I, Pope Anicetus (later transferred to the Catacomb of Callixtus), and Pope Victor I. Epigraphic evidence exists only for Linus, with the discovery of a burial slab marked "Linus" in 1615; however, the slab is broken such that it could have once read "Aquilinus" or "Anullinus".
- The Catacombs of Rome, specifically the Catacomb of Callixtus, the Catacomb of Priscilla (beneath San Martino ai Monti), the Catacomb of Balbina, the Catacomb of Calepodius, the Catacomb of Pontian, and the Catacomb of Felicitas, which were emptied by repeated translations by the ninth century.
- Papal tombs in Old St. Peter's Basilica, which once numbered over 100 papal tombs, nearly all of which were destroyed during the sixteenth/seventeenth century demolition.
- Archbasilica of Saint John Lateran, where over a dozen tombs were destroyed in two fires (1308 and 1361).

Other tombs not included in this list are:

- Tombs of antipopes, which—with few exceptions—are obscure or destroyed. An antipope is a historical papal claimant currently regarded by the Roman Catholic Church as illegitimate. Notably, however, the Tomb of Antipope John XXIII is in the Battistero di San Giovanni in Florence.
- Santi Vincenzo e Anastasio a Trevi, the resting place of the precordium of 22 popes from Sixtus V (1585–1590) to Leo XIII (1878–1903).

== 1st–5th centuries ==
=== 1st century ===
Pontificate	Portrait	Common English name	Image	Sculptor	Location	Notes
30–67 (as Head of the Church)		Peter; Saint Peter		Gian Lorenzo Bernini (St. Peter's Baldachin)	St. Peter's Basilica, Vatican City (Rome)	See Saint Peter's tomb
post 42 / ante 57–64/67(?) (as Bishop of Rome)		Peter; Saint Peter		Gian Lorenzo Bernini (St. Peter's Baldachin)	St. Peter's Basilica, Vatican City (Rome)	See Saint Peter's tomb

=== 2nd century ===
Pontificate	Portrait	Common English name	Image	Sculptor	Location	Notes
c. 157–168		Anicetus; Saint Anicetus			Palazzo Altemps (Piazza Navona), Rome	Remains transferred from Vatican Hill to the Cemetery of Callixtus and possibly again thereafter; sarcophagus which may once have contained remains is extant in the Palazzo Altemps

=== 3rd century ===
Pontificate	Portrait	Common English name	Image	Sculptor	Location	Notes
25 June 253 – 5 March 254		Lucius I Saint Lucius			Santa Cecilia in Trastevere, Rome	Transferred from the Catacomb of Callixtus to one or more of: Santa Cecilia in Trastevere, San Silvestro in Capite, and Santa Prassede; sarcophagus that once held remains is extant in the crypt of Santa Cecilia in Trastevere
17 December 283 – 22 April 296		Caius; Saint Caius			Sant'Andrea della Valle (Barberini chapel), Rome	Translated from the crypt of St. Eusebius in the Cemetery of Callixtus to San Silvestre in Capite, then to another church, then to the private chapel of the Barberini princes in Sant'Andrea della Valle

=== 4th century ===
Pontificate	Portrait	Common English name	Image	Sculptor	Location	Notes
18 January 336 – 7 October 336		Mark; Saint Mark			San Marco Evangelista al Campidoglio, Rome	Translated from the Catacomb of Balbina, one of the Catacombs of Rome, to an urn below the main altar of San Marco

=== 5th century ===
Pontificate	Portrait	Common English name	Image	Sculptor	Location	Notes
29 September 440 – 10 November 461		Leo I Saint Leo; Leo the Great		Alessandro Algardi (relief)	St. Peter's Basilica, Chapel of the Madonna of Partorienti	First pope buried on the porch of Old St. Peter's Basilica; translated multiple times, combined with Leos II, III, and IV circa 855; removed in the seventeenth century and placed under his own altar, below Algardi's relief, Fuga d'Attila (pictured)

== 6th–10th centuries ==
=== 6th century ===
Pontificate	Portrait	Common English name	Image	Sculptor	Location	Notes
3 September 590 – 12 March 604		Gregory I, O.S.B. Saint Gregory; Gregory the Great		Unknown	St. Peter's Basilica	Originally buried in the portico of Old St. Peter's, partly transferred to Soissons; during the demolition of St. Peter's, transferred to Sant'Andrea della Valle then Cappella Clementina, near the entrance of the modern St. Peter's

=== 7th century ===
Pontificate	Portrait	Common English name	Image	Sculptor	Location	Notes
13 September 604 – 22 February 606		Sabinian		Unknown	St. Peter's Basilica	Original monument in the atrium of Old St. Peter's destroyed during the demolition of Old St. Peter's; small fragment of the original epitaph remains in the crypt of St. Peter's Basilica
25 August 608 – 8 May 615		Boniface IV, O.S.B. Saint Boniface		Unknown	St. Peter's Basilica	Originally buried in the portico of Old St. Peter's; translated to the interior; one arm translated to Santa Maria in Cosmedin; other relics translated to the Chapel of St. Sylvester beside the Church of the Quattro Coronati; remainder translated to another chapel of St. Peter's; oratory which once contained the tomb is extant, as well as a sketch of the tomb by Ciampini
December 681 – 3 July 683		Leo II; Saint Leo II		Unknown	St. Peter's Basilica, Chapel of the Madonna of Partorienti	Originally buried in Old St. Peter's; translated under the altar of the Chapel of the Madonna della Colonna; combined with Leo I in the early seventeenth century; for centuries believed to be under the altar of the Church of San Stefano in Ferrara; combined remains of Leos I, II, and IV found during the demolition of Old St. Peter's

=== 8th century ===
Pontificate	Portrait	Common English name	Image	Sculptor	Location	Notes
1 February 772 – 26 December 795		Adrian I		Unknown	St. Peter's Basilica	Original monument in the Oratory of Cathedra Petri destroyed during the demolition of Old St. Peter's; inscription, composed by Charlemagne, remains in the portico of modern St. Peter's
26 December 795 – 12 June 816		Leo III; Saint Leo		Unknown	St. Peter's Basilica, Chapel of the Madonna of Partorienti	Originally buried in Old St. Peter's; combined with Leo II and IV by Pope Paschal II; combined sarcophagus destroyed during the demolition of Old St. Peter's; combined with Leo I in 1601 and placed in a sarcophagus under the altar of our Savior della Colonna in new St. Peter's

=== 9th century ===
Pontificate	Portrait	Common English name	Image	Sculptor	Location	Notes
January 847 – 17 July 855		Leo IV, O.S.B. Saint Leo		Unknown	St. Peter's Basilica, Chapel of the Madonna of Partorienti	Combined with Leos I, II, and III
24 April 858 – 13 November 867		Nicholas I Saint Nicholas; Nicholas the Great		Unknown	St. Peter's Basilica	Originally buried in the atrium of Old St. Peter's; epitaph partially preserved during the demolition of Old St. Peter's, extant in the Vatican grottoes
14 December 867 – 14 December 872		Adrian II		Unknown	St. Peter's Basilica	Originally buried in Old St. Peter's; epitaph partially preserved during the demolition of Old St. Peter's, still visible in the Vatican grottoes
17 May 884 – c.September 885		Adrian III; Saint Adrian		Unknown	Nonantola Abbey, Modena	Crypt altar

=== 10th century ===
Pontificate	Portrait	Common English name	Image	Sculptor	Location	Notes
October 974 – 10 July 983		Benedict VII		Unknown	Santa Croce in Gerusalemme	Funerary inscription embedded in the wall near the entrance
3 May 996 – 18 February 999		Gregory V		Unknown	St. Peter's Basilica	Tomb discovered on August 14, 1607, under the pavement of St. Peter's; exhumed and reburied on January 15, 1609, in a fourth/fifth century sarcophagus
2 April 999 – 12 May 1003		Sylvester II		Gzila Nalder and Giuseppe Damko	Archbasilica of Saint John Lateran	Destroyed in the Lateran fire of 1308; charred remains were collected and buried in a polyandrum in the same basilica; epitaph reingraved on a cenotaph in the same basilica; modern monument created in 1910

== 11th–15th centuries ==
=== 11th century ===
Pontificate	Portrait	Common English name	Image	Sculptor	Location	Notes
31 July 1009 – 12 May 1012		Sergius IV		Francesco Borromini	Archbasilica of Saint John Lateran	Original destroyed in a fire in either 1308 or 1361; remains collected in a polyandrum in the same basilica; new cenotaph placed on the right side of the main nave by Borromini in the seventeenth century
24 December 1046 – 9 October 1047		Clement II		"Reims workshop"	Bamberg Cathedral	Only extant papal tomb outside of Italy and France; original completed circa 1237, dismantled in the seventeenth century, separating the tomb-chest and effigy; tomb-chest constructed with marble from Kärnten
17 July 1048 – 9 August 1048		Damasus II		Unknown	San Lorenzo fuori le Mura	Sarcophagus in the portico
12 February 1049 – 19 April 1054		Leo IX; Saint Leo		Unknown	St. Peter's Basilica	Originally buried in the east wall of Old St. Peter's, close to the altar of Gregory I; coffin opened on January 11, 1606, during the demolition of Old St. Peter's and parts were taken as relics; remainder reburied under the altar of Saints Marziale and Valeria, now dedicated to the Crucifixion of St. Peter.
22 April 1073 – 25 May 1085		Gregory VII, O.S.B. Saint Gregory		Unknown	Salerno Cathedral	Originally buried in the Church of St. Matthew; discovered in 1573, opened in 1578, reburied beneath the Salerno altar; opened again in 1605 (head taken to Cathedral of Soana; corpse translated to chapel of the Crociata); original sarcophagus placed in transept in 1954
24 May 1086 – 16 September 1087		Victor III, O.S.B. Blessed Victor		Unknown	Abbey of Monte Cassino	Translated in 1515 to the altar in the chapel of St. Bertharius, then the chapel of St. Victor; transferred from Monte Cassino during World War II to San Paolo fuori le Mura, avoiding the aerial bombing that destroyed the original chapel; returned to the rebuilt basilica of Monte Cassino in 1963

=== 12th century ===
Pontificate	Portrait	Common English name	Image	Sculptor	Location	Notes
24 January 1118 – 28 January 1119		Gelasius II, O.S.B.		Unknown	Cluny Abbey	Tuscan-style bright marble tomb destroyed in 1792 during the French Revolution; fragments remain
14 February 1130 – 24 September 1143		Innocent II, Can. Reg.		Vespignani (design)	Santa Maria in Trastevere	Originally buried in the porphyry sarcophagus of Emperor Hadrian in the Archbasilica of Saint John Lateran; damaged during the fire of 1308 and moved to the vestibule; moved to a simple slab in the fifteenth century; moved to Santa Maria Trastevere
8 July 1153 – 3 December 1154		Anastasius IV		Unknown	Vatican Museum	Reused the sarcophagus of Helena of Constantinople, Constantine's mother; only tomb to survive the Lateran fires of 1308 and 1361 (restored fully in 1509); moved to the treasury of the Vatican Museum in the nineteenth century
4 December 1154 – 1 September 1159		Adrian IV, Can. Reg.		Unknown	St. Peter's Basilica	Reused an Early Christian sarcophagus
7 September 1159 – 30 August 1181		Alexander III		Francesco Borromini	Archbasilica of Saint John Lateran	Ruined by mob graffiti and then destroyed in the Lateran fire of 1308 or 1361; new cenotaph raised in seventeenth century
1 September 1181 – 25 November 1185		Lucius III		Unknown	Verona Cathedral	Originally buried in a marble sarcophagus in front of the high altar; moved beneath the pavement under a red Veronese marble slab during the reign of bishop Gilberti (1524–1543); damaged during a storm on February 25, 1879; recovered with marble thereafter and original slab hung on the wall of the Cathedral
25 November 1185 – 19 October 1187		Urban III		G.B. Boffa (modern cenotaph)	Ferrara Cathedral	Moved several times; original tomb replaced with cenotaph in fifteenth century
8 January 1198 – 16 July 1216		Innocent III		Giuseppe Lucchetti	Archbasilica of Saint John Lateran	Originally buried in the Perugia Cathedral; moved several times within the cathedral, and temporarily combined with Urban IV and Martin IV, before being transferred to Archbasilica of Saint John Lateran in 1891

=== 13th century ===
Pontificate	Portrait	Common English name	Image	Sculptor	Location	Notes
25 June 1243 – 7 December 1254		Innocent IV		Tommaso Malvito	Naples Cathedral	Original, commissioned by archbishop Humbert of Montauro, almost completely destroyed; the recumbent figure (with the anachronistic round top tiara) and above reliefs were added in the sixteenth century
29 August 1261 – 2 October 1264		Urban IV		Giovanni Pisano (original)	Perugia Cathedral	Destroyed in the late fourteenth century, save the epitaph which is currently in the Civic Museum of Perugia; combined with Innocent III and Martin IV in 1587 and interred in the sacristy; Innocent III's remains were transferred to the Archbasilica of Saint John Lateran in the late nineteenth century, but the iron casket is extant in the sacristy of the Perugia Cathedral; possibly translated to the Troyes Cathedral in 1901
5 February 1265 – 29 November 1268		Clement IV		Pietro Oderisi	San Francesco (Viterbo)	Translated from Santa Maria in Gradi
1 September 1271 – 10 January 1276		Gregory X Blessed Gregory		Margaritone d'Arezzo	Arezzo Cathedral	Original body and sarcophagus are extant
11 July 1276 – 18 August 1276		Adrian V		Arnolfo di Cambio (possibly Pietro Vassalletto)	San Francesco (Viterbo)	Modified in 1994
8 September 1276 – 20 May 1277		John XXI		Filippo Gnaccarini	Viterbo Cathedral	Original destroyed in the sixteenth century, no longer extant; new monument constructed in the 19th century and damaged during World War II, of which a sarcophagus and other fragments remain
25 November 1277 – 22 August 1280		Nicholas III		Unknown	St. Peter's Basilica	Original destroyed during the demolition of Old St. Peter's; combined with two Rainaldo Orsinis in 1620
22 February 1281 – 28 March 1285		Martin IV		Giovanni Pisano	Perugia Cathedral	Original tomb destroyed by 1375; reconstructed and redestroyed by the end of the fourteenth century; combined with Popes Urban IV and Innocent III in 1587; Innocent III's remains were transferred to the Archbasilica of Saint John Lateran in the late nineteenth century, but the iron casket containing Martin IV and possibly Urban IV is extant in the sacristy of the Perugia Cathedral
2 April 1285 – 3 April 1287		Honorius IV		Arnolfo di Cambio (disputed)	Santa Maria in Aracoeli	Original destroyed early in the demolition of Old St. Peter's; baldecchio destroyed and replaced in 1727 Relocated from Old St. Peter's to Santa Maria in Ara Coeli in 1545; the inscription dates it to 1288. Its attribution to Arnolfo di Cambio has been contested, and according to Cellini is a result of the confusion with Honorius III's tomb.
22 February 1288 – 4 April 1292		Nicholas IV, O.F.M.		Domenico Fontana (design); Leonardo da Sarzana (sculptor); Leonardo Sormani (figures)	Basilica di Santa Maria Maggiore	Originally buried in a simple urn; mausoleum commissioned in the late sixteenth century
5 July 1294 – 13 December 1294		Celestine V, O.S.B. Saint Celestine		Girolamo Pittoni da Vicenza	Santa Maria di Collemaggio (L'Aquila)	Originally buried in Church of St. Anthony; moved to Church of St. Agatha; stolen in 1327 by L'Aquilan friars; damaged in the 2009 L'Aquila earthquake
24 December 1294 – 11 October 1303		Boniface VIII		Unknown	St. Peter's Basilica	Original tomb chapel, into which Boniface VIII had moved the relics of Boniface IV, destroyed

=== 14th century ===
Pontificate	Portrait	Common English name	Image	Sculptor	Location	Notes
22 October 1303 – 7 July 1304		Benedict XI, O.P. Blessed Benedict		Giovanni Pisano	Basilica of San Domenico (Perugia)	Wall tomb and ossuary
5 June 1305 – 20 April 1314		Clement V		Jehan de Bonneval	Collegiate church (Uzeste)	
7 August 1316 – 4 December 1334		John XXII		Unknown	Avignon Cathedral	Moved several times within the cathedral's chapels; all 60 statuettes have been stolen, head of effigy is originally from another bishop's tomb; damaged badly during French Revolution
20 December 1334 – 25 April 1342		Benedict XII, O.Cist.		Jean Lavenier	Avignon Cathedral	Bust of Benedict XII in the St. Peter's Basilica grottoes; fragments of original in Fondation Calvet
7 May 1342 – 6 December 1352		Clement VI		Pierre Boye, Jean Sanholis, and Jean David	Abbey of La Chaise-Dieu	Sculpted weepers in Musée Crozatier, Le Puy; sculpted angel in Musée de Petit-Palais, Avignon
18 December 1352 – 12 September 1362		Innocent VI		Beltran Nogayrol	Chartreuse du Val de Bénédiction (Villeneuve-lès-Avignon)	
28 September 1362 – 19 December 1370		Urban V, O.S.B. Blessed Urban V		Joglarii	Abbey of St. Victor (Marseille)	Effigy in Musée de Petit-Palais, Avignon
30 December 1370 – 26 March 1378		Gregory XI		Pietro Paolo Olivieri	Santa Francesca Romana	Original Olivieri relief carved in 1584 (drawing above); replica located in Palais des Papes
8 April 1378 – 15 October 1389		Urban VI		Unknown	St. Peter's Basilica	Saved during the deconstruction of Old St. Peter's; nearly dumped by workmen for use as a water trough

=== 15th century ===
Pontificate	Portrait	Common English name	Image	Sculptor	Location	Notes
17 October 1404 – 6 November 1406		Innocent VII		Unknown	St. Peter's Basilica	Originally buried in the Chapel of Saints Peter and Paul, moved to the Chapel of St. Thomas in 1455, moved into a mid-fifteenth century copy of the original sarcophagus on September 12, 1606
30 November 1406 – 4 July 1415		Gregory XII		Camillo Rusconi	San Flaviano (Recanati)	Cardinal at the time of his death, due to his resignation during the Council of Constance; Moved in 1623, 1760, and 1793; illustrations of an "original" tomb (pictured) have been deemed fabrications by historians; last papal tomb outside Rome (cf. Tomb of Antipope John XXIII); original sarcophagus extant
11 November 1417 – 20 February 1431		Martin V		Simone Ghini	Archbasilica of Saint John Lateran	Moved in front of the high altar in 1853
3 March 1431 – 23 February 1447		Eugene IV, Can. Reg.		Iaia da Piso and Pellegrino di Antonio da Viterbo	San Salvatore in Lauro	Moved out of Old St. Peter's before its demolition
6 March 1447 – 24 March 1455		Nicholas V, O.P.		Mino da Fiesole	St. Peter's Basilica	Moved from the left outer aisle of Old St. Peter's to the right outer aisle; monument (not sarcophagus) destroyed during the demolition of Old St. Peter's
8 April 1455 – 6 August 1458		Callixtus III		Unknown	St. Peter's Basilica	Originally located in Chapel of St. Mary della febbre; monument, but not sarcophagus, destroyed during the demolition of Old St. Peter's
8 April 1455 – 6 August 1458		Callixtus III		Filippio Moratilla	Santa Maria in Monserrato	Remains later combined with Alexander VI
19 August 1458 – 15 August 1464		Pius II		Paolo Romano	Sant'Andrea della Valle	Heart enshrined in the Duomo of Ancona; originally buried in the Chapel of St. Andrews in St. Peter's; moved to San Andrea della Valle in 1614
30 August 1464 – 26 July 1471		Paul II		Giovanni Dalmata (effigy); Mino da Fiesole (figures and bas-reliefs)	St. Peter's Basilica	Monument moved in 1544 and torn down in seventeenth century; sarcophagus survived demolition of Old St. Peter's
9 August 1471 – 12 August 1484		Sixtus IV, O.F.M.		Antonio del Pollaiuolo	Treasury Museum of St. Peter's Basilica	Originally located in the choir chapel of Old St. Peter's; moved in 1610 to the sacristy; moved in 1625 to the Chapel del Coro in new St. Peter's; combined with Julius II in 1926; moved again in 1940s
29 August 1484 – 25 July 1492		Innocent VIII		Antonio del Pollaiuolo	St. Peter's Basilica	First papal tomb to depict a live pope rather than a deathbed effigy; originally placed in the Oratory of Our Lady in Old St. Peter's.
11 August 1492 – 18 August 1503		Alexander VI		Filippio Moratilla	Santa Maria di Monserrato	Originally located in the oratory of Saints Cosmas and Damian, in the round chapel of Santa Maria de Febribus; moved in the sixteenth century next to Calixtus III; combined in 1582 in the Chapel of Santa Maria della Febbre; survived demolition of Old St. Peter's but broken up in 1605; urns were taken to Santa Maria di Monserrato; monument in Chapel of St. Diego sculpted in 1881

== 16th–21st centuries ==
=== 16th century ===
Pontificate	Portrait	Common English name	Image	Sculptor	Location	Notes
22 September 1503 – 18 October 1503		Pius III		Unknown	St. Peter's Basilica	Originally built in Old St. Peter's; last papal mausoleum erected in Old St. Peter's
22 September 1503 – 18 October 1503		Pius III		Sebastiano Ferrucci	Sant'Andrea della Valle	Moved to Sant'Andrea della Valle by Paul V
31 October 1503 – 21 February 1513		Julius II		Michelangelo; Possible assistants include: Antonello Gagini; Giacomo del Duca	San Pietro in Vincoli	Original, planned tomb—intended for the Cappella Maggiore of St. Peter's—never completed and moved to San Pietro in Vincoli; See Tomb of Pope Julius II, Moses and Dying Slave
31 October 1503 – 21 February 1513		Julius II		Unknown	St. Peter's Basilica	Actual remains deposited in a simple sarcophagus, combined with Sixtus IV, his uncle
9 March 1513 – 1 December 1521		Leo X		Baccio Bandinelli (design); Antonio da Sangallo the Younger (monument); Raffaello da Montelupo (statue)	Santa Maria sopra Minerva	Translated from Old St. Peter's in 1536
9 January 1522 – 14 September 1523		Adrian VI		Baldassare Peruzzi (design); Michelangelo of Sieno and Niccolò Tribolo (carved)	Santa Maria dell'Anima	Translated from Old St. Peter's in 1533 to the national church of the Holy Roman Empire
26 November 1523 – 25 September 1534		Clement VII		Nanni di Baccio Bigio	Santa Maria sopra Minerva	Originally buried in a brick tomb in Old St. Peter's; tomb is across from that of Leo X, another Medici pope
13 October 1534 – 10 November 1549		Paul III		Guglielmo della Porta	St. Peter's Basilica	Moved in 1599
7 February 1550 – 29 March 1555		Julius III		Unknown	St. Peter's Basilica	Originally buried in St. Peter's Basilica sans monument in a red stone sarcophagus in the chapel of San Andrea; reinterred in an ancient sarcophagus in 1608, which was reopened two years later during the demolition of Old St. Peter's; sometimes cited as buried in the Del Monte chapel of San Pietro in Montorio along with his adopted cardinal-nephew, Innocenzo Ciocchi Del Monte
9 April 1555 – 30 April or 1 May 1555		Marcellus II		Unknown	St. Peter's Basilica	No monument; fourth century sarcophagus, bearing a traditio legis
23 May 1555 – 18 August 1559		Paul IV		Pirro Ligorio (design); Giacomo da Castignola, Tommaso della Porta, Gian Pietro Annon, and Rocco da Montefiascone (sculpted)	Santa Maria sopra Minerva	
26 December 1559 – 9 December 1565		Pius IV		Unknown	Santa Maria degli Angeli e dei Martiri	Moved from Old St. Peter's in 1583; buried under the altar with a nearby wall plaque
7 January 1566 – 1 May 1572		Saint; Pius V, O.P.		Domenico Fontana (design); Leonardo Sormani (effigy); Nicholas Cordier (left and right bas-reliefs); Silla Longhi da Viggiu (center bas-relief); Pierre Le Gros the Younger (design and execution of the sarcophagus)	Basilica di Santa Maria Maggiore	Translated from Old St. Peter's in 1583; After the canonisation process was started by Antonin Cloche, the sarcophagus with the body of the saint was added in 1697–98. A flap of gilded bronze, showing the effigy of the pope in shallow relief, is hinged and can be opened to venerate the body of the saint.
13 May 1572 – 10 April 1585		Gregory XIII		Camillo Rusconi	St. Peter's Basilica	Original monument destroyed; new monument built in eighteenth century
24 April 1585 – 27 August 1590		Sixtus V, O.F.M. Conv.		Domenico Fontana (design); Vasoldo (sculpted)	Basilica di Santa Maria Maggiore	
15 September 1590 – 27 September 1590		Urban VII		Ambrogio Buonvicino	Santa Maria sopra Minerva	
5 December 1590 – 15 /16 October 1591		Gregory XIV		Prospero Antichi	St. Peter's Basilica	
29 October 1591 – 30 December 1591		Innocent IX		Unknown	St. Peter's Basilica	No monument
30 January 1592 – 3 March 1605		Clement VIII		Flaminio Ponzio (design)	Basilica di Santa Maria Maggiore	Moved in 1646 to the Borghese Crypt in the Paulline Chapel in Santa Maria Maggiore; figure of Clement VIII was carved by Silla da Viggiu and the cornice figures by Pietro Bernini; features "The Peace of Henry IV and Philip III by Ippolito Buzzi and "The Coronation of Clement VIII" by Bernini, "The Canonization of St. Giacinto and St. Raimondo" by Giovanni Antonio Valsolde, "The Occupation of Ferrara" by Ambriogo Bonvicino, and "Invitation of the Troops in Hungary" by Camillo Mariani

=== 17th century ===
Pontificate	Portrait	Common English name	Image	Sculptor	Location	Notes
1 April 1605 – 27 April 1605		Leo XI		Alessandro Algardi (pope and sarcophagus); Ercole Ferrata (Prudence); Giuseppe Peroni (Liberty)	St. Peter's Basilica	
16 May 1605 – 28 January 1621		Paul V		Flaminio Ponzio (design); Silla da Viggiu (figure of pope); Stefano Moderna, Ambrogio Bonvicinio, Ippolito Buzzi, Cristoforo Stati, and Antonio Valsoldo (reliefs); Pompeo Ferucci (cornice figures)	Basilica di Santa Maria Maggiore	Moved from the Borghese Chapel of St. Peter's to the Pauline chapel of Santa Maria Maggiore
9 February 1621 – 8 July 1623		Gregory XV		Pierre Le Gros the Younger (design and execution); Pierre-Étienne Monnot (sculpted the two Famae from designs by Le Gros))	Sant'Ignazio	Uniquely combines the pope's tomb with that of his cardinal-nephew, Ludovico Ludovisi. According to Reardon the pope was originally buried in the Quirinal Palace and his remains moved to Sant'Ignazio in 1634. The monument was created c. 1709–14.
6 August 1623 – 29 July 1644		Urban VIII		Gian Lorenzo Bernini	St. Peter's Basilica	
15 September 1644 – 7 January 1655		Innocent X		G. Valvassori and G.B. Maini	Sant'Agnese in Agone	Cenotaph featuring the Virtues (left) and Strength (right) erected in 1730
7 April 1655 – 22 May 1667		Alexander VII		Gian Lorenzo Bernini (monument); Michele Maglia (figure of pope); Giuseppe Mazzuoli (Charity); Lazzaro Morelli and Giulio Catani (Truth); Giuseppe Baratta and Giulio Cartari (Prudence); Giulio Catani (Justice)	St. Peter's Basilica	Sculpted between 1672 and 1678; Charity's breast's covered by Innocent XI; See Tomb of Pope Alexander VII
20 June 1667 – 9 December 1669		Clement IX		Ercole Ferrata	Basilica di Santa Maria Maggiore	Moved from St. Peter's in 1675; figures are Clement IX (by Girolamo Rainaldi), Charity (by Ferrata), and Truth (by Cosimo Fancelli)
29 April 1670 – 22 July 1676		Clement X		Mattia de' Rossi (design)	St. Peter's Basilica	Figures are Clement X (by Ercole Ferrata), Clemency (by Giuseppe Mazzuoli), Goodness (by Lazzaro Morelli), and two putti (by Filippo Carcani)
21 September 1676 – 11/12 August 1689		Innocent XI; Blessed Innocent XI		C. Maratta (design); Pierre Etienne Monnot (sculpted)	St. Peter's Basilica	Featured the pope with the Virtue Truth and the Goddess Athena; bas-relief on the sarcophagus reads "The Liberation of Vienna"
21 September 1676 – 11/12 August 1689		Innocent XI; Blessed Innocent XI		Unknown	St. Peter's Basilica	Separate glass sarcophagus moved under the altar of the Transfiguration after his body was removed from the altar of Saint Sebastian in 2011
6 October 1689 – 1 February 1691		Alexander VIII		Angelo de Rossi	St. Peter's Basilica	
12 July 1691 – 27 September 1700		Innocent XII		Filippo della Valle and Ferdinando Fuga	St. Peter's Basilica	Moved from the tribune to the left transept in the late eighteenth century by Cardinal Giuseppe Spinelli; originally buried in a simple marble sarcophagus in the Chapel of the Sacrament; present monument completed in 1746; features the pope bestowing the benediction with Charity (left) and Justice (right)

=== 18th century ===
Pontificate	Portrait	Common English name	Image	Sculptor	Location	Notes
23 November 1700 – 19 March 1721		Clement XI		Carlo Fontana	St. Peter's Basilica	In the Choir chapel; no monument; cenotaph also placed in Ferrara Cathedral
8 May 1721 – 7 March 1724		Innocent XIII		Unknown	St. Peter's Basilica	Originally buried in a stucco sepulcher in the right nave of St. Peter's; reinterred in an ancient sarcophagus in 1836
29 May 1724 – 21 February 1730		Servant of God; Benedict XIII, O.P.		Pietro Bracci and Carlo Marchionni	Santa Maria sopra Minerva	Remains were originally with his monument in St. Peter's Basilica
12 July 1730 – 6 February 1740		Clement XII		Giovanni Battista Maini	Archbasilica of Saint John Lateran	
17 August 1740 – 3 May 1758		Benedict XIV		Pietro Bracci	St. Peter's Basilica	Two figures are Knowledge (by Bracci) and Temptation (by Gaspare Sibilla)
6 July 1758 – 2 February 1769		Clement XIII		Antonio Canova	St. Peter's Basilica	
19 May 1769 – 22 September 1774		Clement XIV, O.F.M. Conv.		Antonio Canova	Santi Apostoli, Rome	Moved to Santi Apostoli in 1802
15 February 1775 – 29 August 1799		Pius VI		Antonio Canova	Crypt of St. Peter's Basilica	Monument by Antonio Canova, circa 1822
15 February 1775 – 29 August 1799		Pius VI		Unknown	Crypt of St. Peter's Basilica	Remains placed in an ancient sarcophagus with a bas-relief of the Adoration of the Magi by Pius XII in 1949 (below); original praecordia monument in the Valence Cathedral sculpted by Massimiliano Laboureur and commissioned by Napoleon
14 March 1800 – 20 August 1823		Servant of God; Pius VII, O.S.B.		Bertel Thorvaldsen	St. Peter's Basilica	Commissioned at the expense of Cardinal Consalvi, Pius VII's Secretary of State, it depicts the pope blessing the angels of Time and History, with the onlooking figures of Fortitude (left) and Wisdom (right)

=== 19th century ===
Pontificate	Portrait	Common English name	Image	Sculptor	Location	Notes
28 September 1823 – 10 February 1829		Leo XII		Giuseppe Fabris	St. Peter's Basilica	
31 March 1829 – 1 December 1830		Pius VIII		Pietro Tenerani	St. Peter's Basilica	Moved from the Vatican grottoes in 1857 to the Tenerani monument commissioned by Cardinal Albani; figures are the kneeling pontiff and seated Christ as well as Saints Peter (left) and Paul (right); base reliefs are Prudence (left) and Justice (right)
2 February 1831 – 1 June 1846		Gregory XVI, O.S.B. Cam.		Luigi Amici	St. Peter's Basilica	
16 June 1846 – 7 February 1878		Blessed; Pius IX		Unknown	San Lorenzo fuori le Mura	
20 February 1878 – 20 July 1903		Leo XIII		Giulio Tadolini	Archbasilica of Saint John Lateran	Tomb monument. Last pope entombed outside the Vatican until Francis.

=== 20th century ===
Pontificate	Portrait	Common English name	Image	Sculptor	Location	Notes
4 August 1903 – 20 August 1914		Saint; Pius X		Pier Enrico Astorri; Florestano Di Fausto (architect)	St. Peter's Basilica	
3 September 1914 – 22 January 1922		Benedict XV		Pietro Canonica	St. Peter's Basilica	Monument in St. Peter's
3 September 1914 – 22 January 1922		Benedict XV		Giulio Barbieri (bronze effigy)	St. Peter's Basilica	Tomb
6 February 1922 – 10 February 1939		Pius XI		Giannino Castiglioni	St. Peter's Basilica	Candoglia marble sarcophagus topped with a deathbed effigy Located in the Basilica's grottoes in the Chapel of Saint Sebastian.
2 March 1939 – 9 October 1958		Venerable; Pius XII		Francesco Messina (bronze funeral monument)	St. Peter's Basilica	Funeral monument in St. Peter's separate from sarcophagus in the Vatican grottoes.
28 October 1958 – 3 June 1963		Saint; John XXIII		Emilio Greco	St. Peter's Basilica	Moved from the Vatican grottoes to the Altar of Saint Jerome after his beatification on 3 September 2000.
21 June 1963 – 6 August 1978		Saint; Paul VI		Unknown	St. Peter's Basilica	Three reliefs are from the fifteenth century; "as simple as possible [...] neither tomb nor monument" and buried in the ground per Paul VI's wishes.
21 June 1963 – 6 August 1978		Saint; Paul VI		Unknown	St. Peter's Basilica	Updated in October 2018 with "Sanctvs" for his canonisation.
26 August 1978 – 28 September 1978		Blessed; John Paul I		Francesco Vacchini (design); Andrea Bregno (reliefs)	St. Peter's Basilica	Reliefs are late fifteenth century; across the aisle from Marcellus II, another short-reigning pope. Updated in September 2022 with "Beatvs" for his beatification.

=== 21st century ===
Pontificate	Portrait	Common English name	Image	Sculptor	Location	Notes
16 October 1978 – 2 April 2005		Saint; John Paul II		Unknown	St. Peter's Basilica	See Death and funeral of Pope John Paul II. Tomb formerly occupied by John XXIII.
16 October 1978 – 2 April 2005		Saint; John Paul II		Unknown	St. Peter's Basilica	His body was moved from the Vatican grottoes to the chapel of Saint Sebastian after his beatification on 1 May 2011. The inscription "Beatvs" was changed in April 2014 to "Sanctvs" for his canonization.
19 April 2005 – 28 February 2013 (d. 31 December 2022)		Benedict XVI		Unknown	St. Peter's Basilica	See Death and funeral of Pope Benedict XVI. Burial site in the Vatican Grottoes at the same location as John Paul II before his beatification in 2011.
13 March 2013 – 21 April 2025		Francis, S.J.		Unknown	Basilica di Santa Maria Maggiore	See Death and funeral of Pope Francis. First Pope in a century to be buried outside the Vatican since Leo XIII, and the first to not have been entombed at all inside the Vatican since Clement XIV. According to his spiritual testament, "The tomb should be in the ground; simple, without particular ornamentation, bearing only the inscription: Franciscus." The tomb is made of marble from the Italian Region of Liguria, where his grandparents lived before emigrating to Argentina. A reproduction of the Pope's pectoral cross appears at his tomb.

== See also ==
- Index of Vatican City-related articles
