= List of tombs of antipopes =

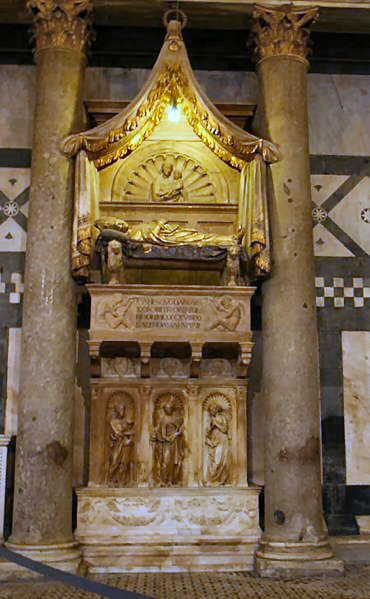
The tomb of Antipope John XXIII in Florence

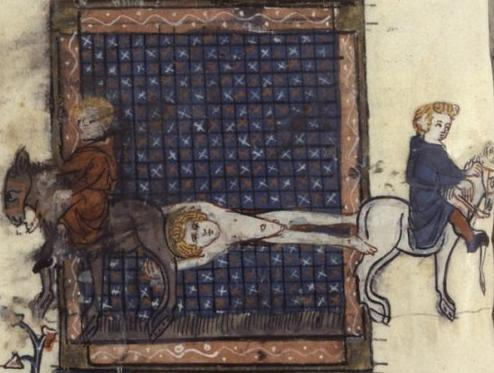
The martyrdom of Hippolytus of Rome

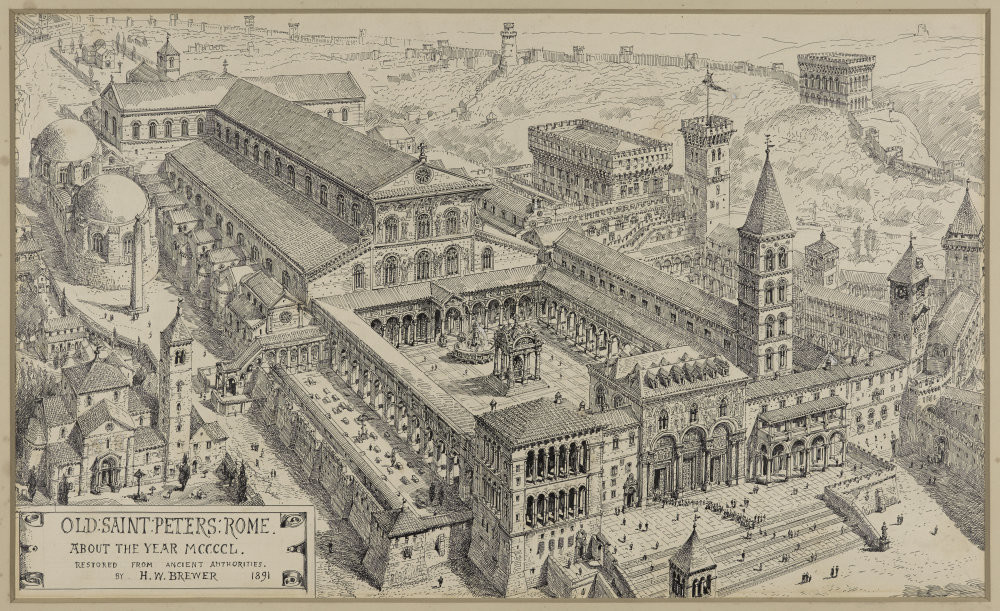
Christopher, who was regarded as a legitimate pope until the 19th century, was buried among the papal tombs in Old St. Peter's Basilica.

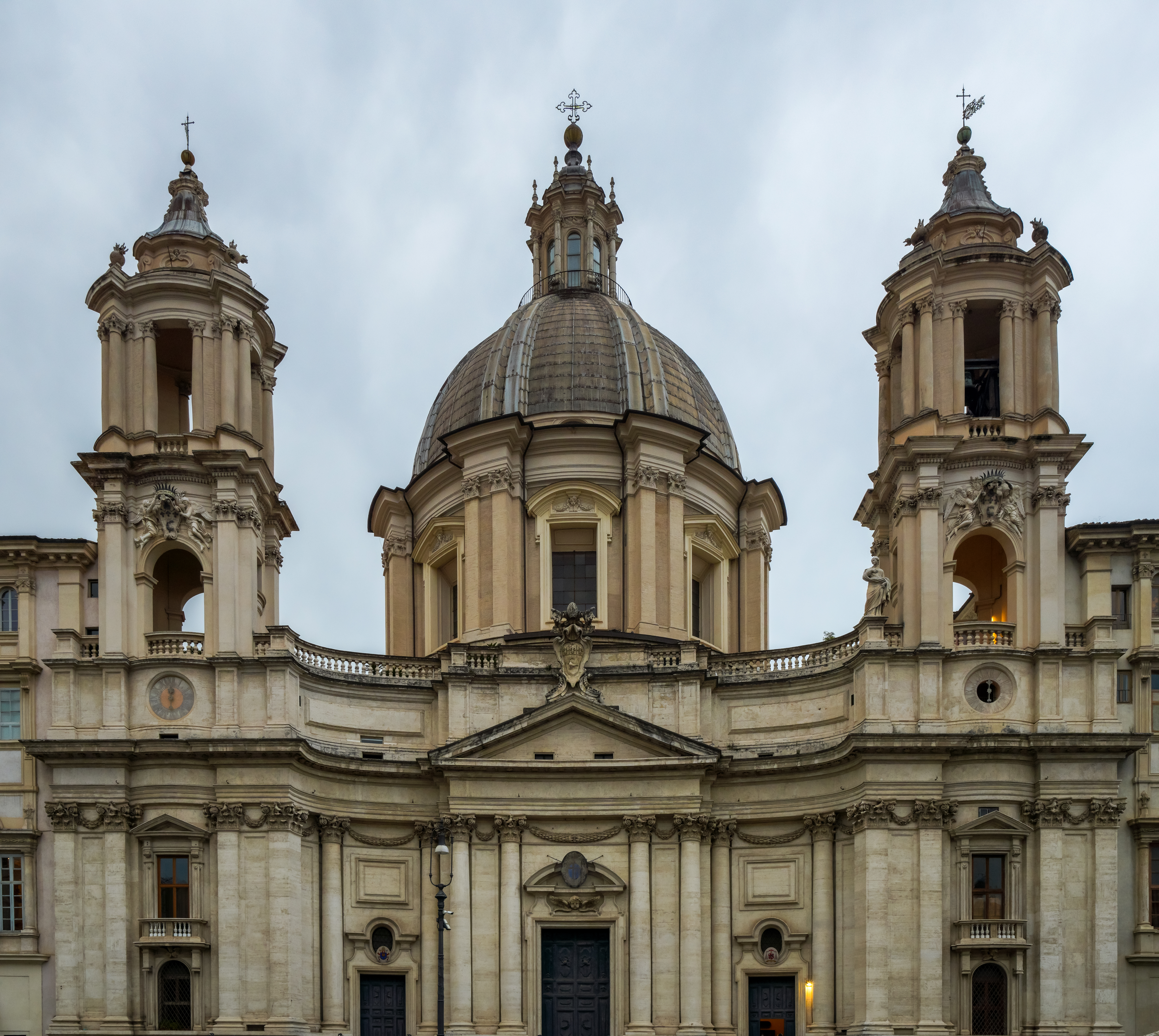
Benedict X's corpse is still intact in Sant'Agnese in Agone.

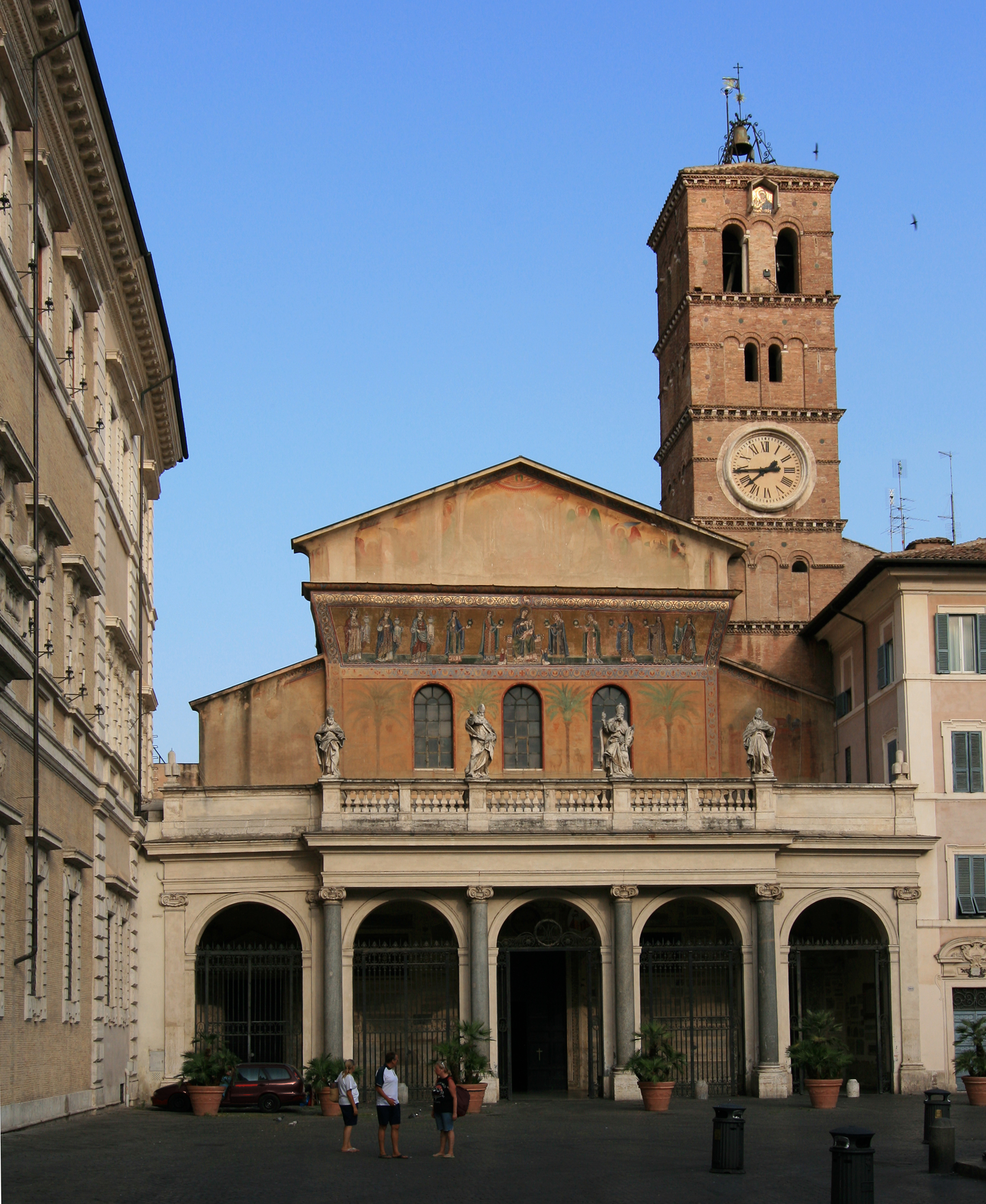
Innocent II demolished and rebuilt Santa Maria in Trastevere to smite the tomb of Anacletus II.

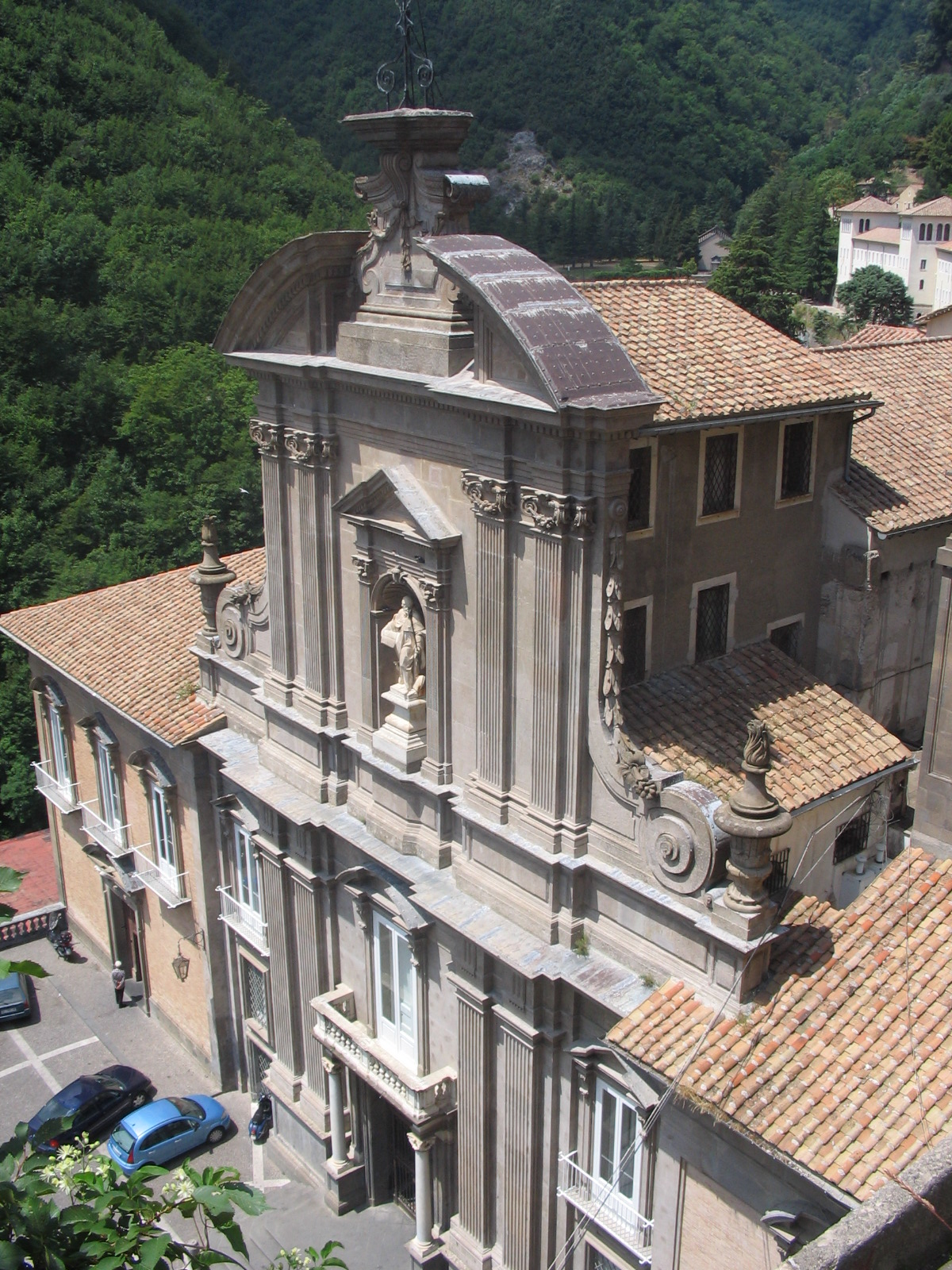
La Trinità della Cava was a prison to several antipopes, including Innocent III.

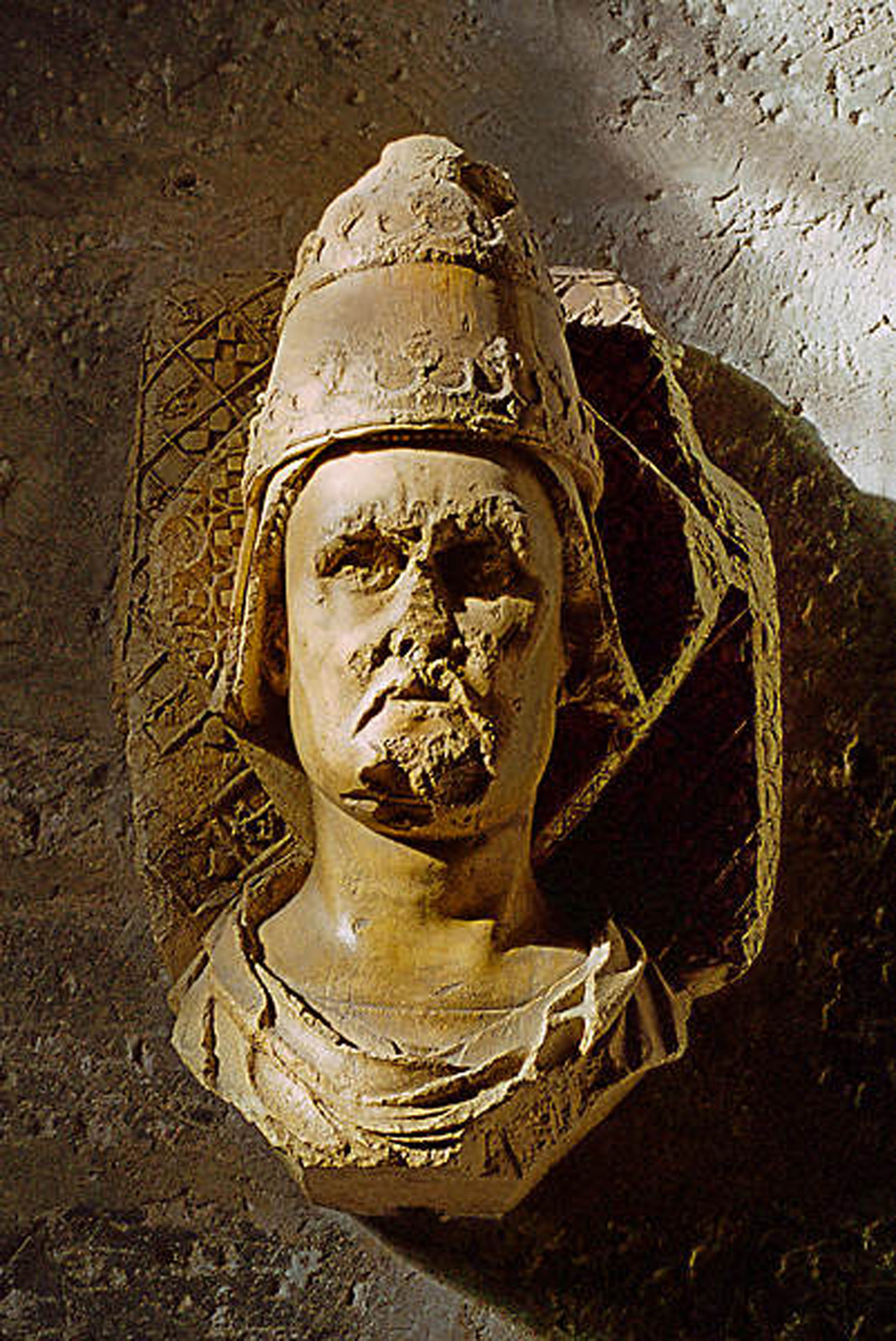
Only the head of the effigy from the tomb of Clement VII (originally in the Avignon Cathedral) survived the French Revolution.

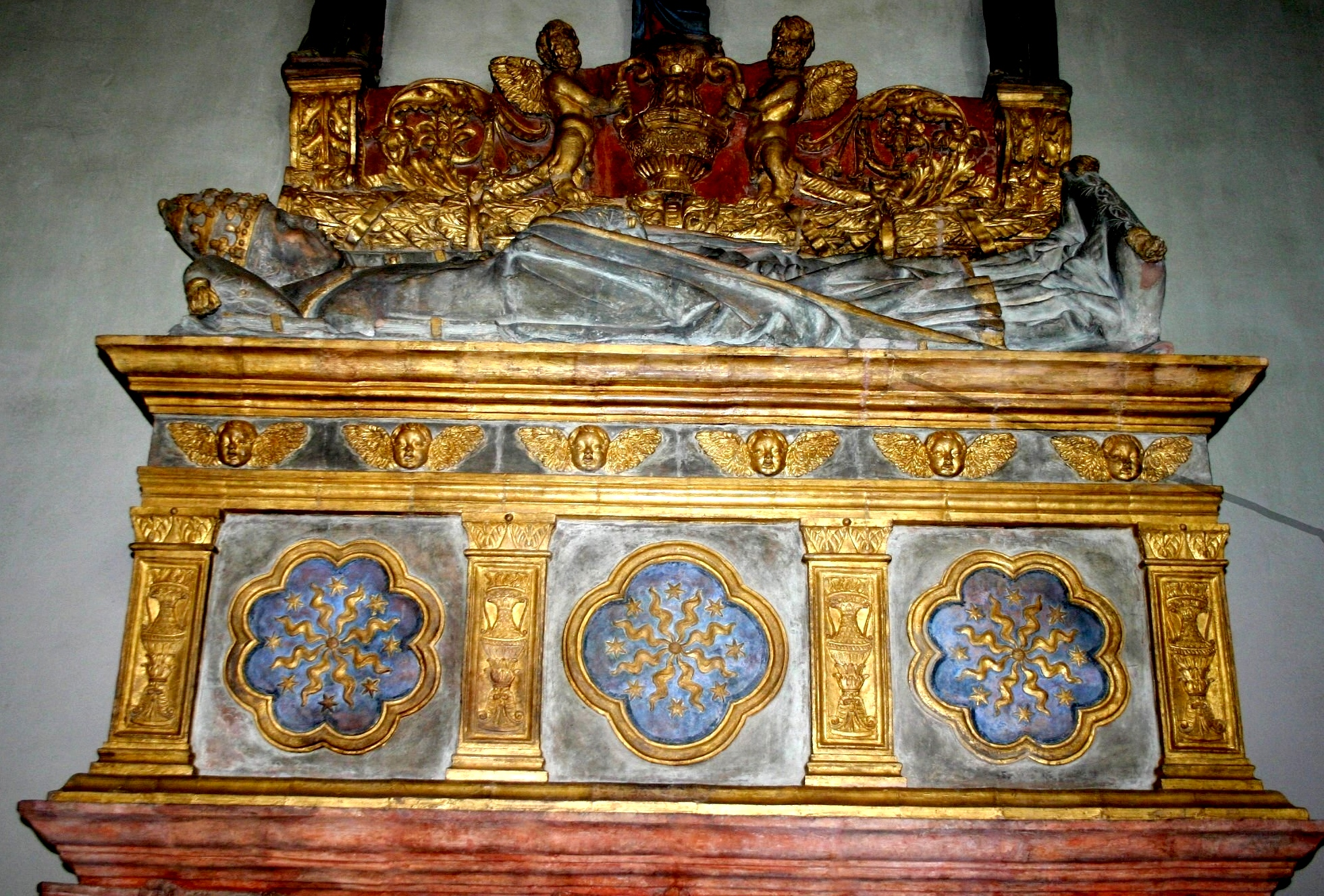
The tomb of Alexander V in San Francesco (Bologna)

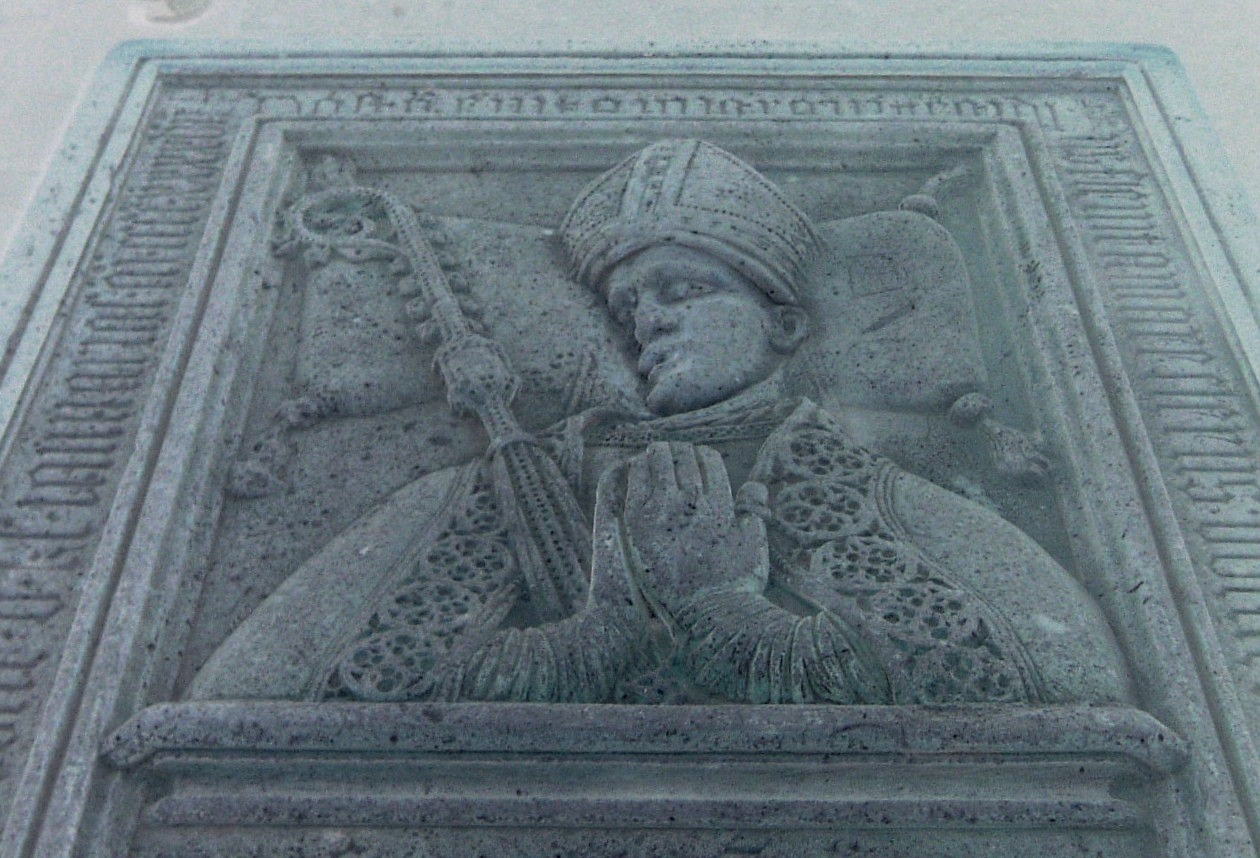
The tomb of Clement VIII in La Seu

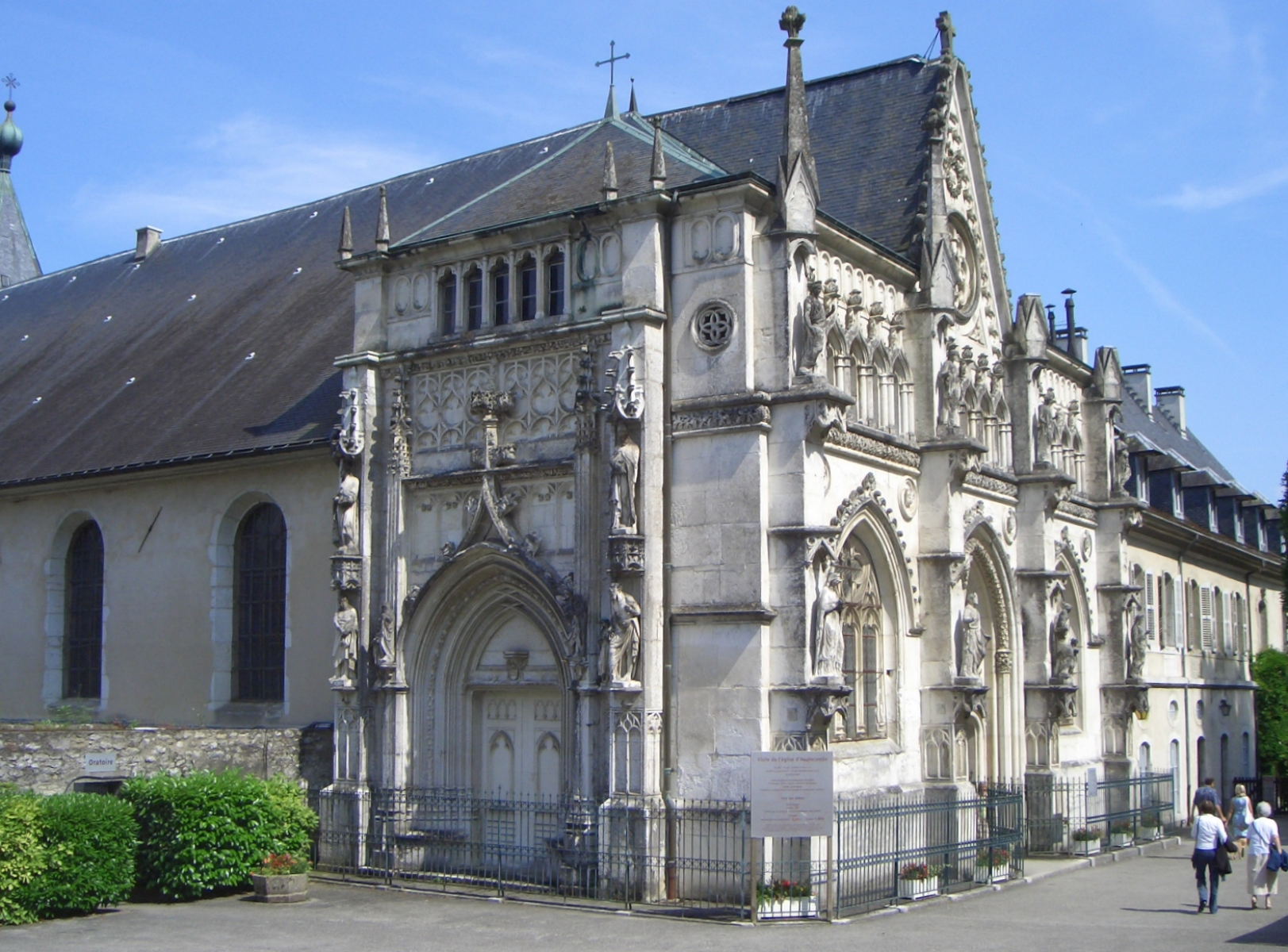
Felix V was buried alongside his predecessors as Count of Savoy in Hautecombe Abbey.

An antipope is a historical papal claimant not recognized as legitimate by the Catholic Church. Unlike papal tombs, the tombs of antipopes have generally not been preserved, with a few notable exceptions.

Several tombs of antipopes were desecrated and destroyed, often by their rival claimants, shortly after their creation. For example, Pope Innocent II razed Santa Maria in Trastevere (one of the main Marian basilicas and one of the oldest churches of Rome) to the ground and was eventually buried over the spot once occupied by the tomb of his rival, Pope Anacletus II. Others survived centuries, only to be destroyed during conflicts such as the French Revolution and the War of the Spanish Succession, a fate common to some non-extant papal tombs. Such was the case with the tomb of Antipope Felix V (the last historical antipope), who was buried with most of his predecessors as Count of Savoy in Hautecombe Abbey.

Others are obscure because of the damnatio memoriae surrounding the lives of antipopes, or because they were refused burial due to excommunication. Some of those can be presumed to have been buried unceremoniously in the monasteries to which the antipopes were confined after submitting or losing power. The exception is Hippolytus of Rome, the first antipope, who was translated to Rome by his former rival Pope Fabian following his martyrdom, and is regarded as a saint.

Various antipopes, however, received prominent burials, including one among the papal tombs in Old St. Peter's Basilica (which were destroyed during the sixteenth/seventeenth century demolition). In particular, the conciliar claimants of the Western Schism were entombed in elaborate tombs in important churches by famous sculptors. The tomb of Antipope John XXIII typifies political iconography of antipapal burial, subtly arguing for the legitimacy of the entombed.

Pontificate	Common English name	Sculptor	Location	Notes
217–235	Hippolytus; Saint Hippolytus	Unknown	Cemetery of Hippolytus	Remains translated to Rome by his rival Pope Fabian; inscription by Pope Damasus I recorded in Orazio Marucchi's Christian Epigraphy
251–258	Novatian	Unknown	Unknown	Tombstone discovered in 1932 on the Via Tiburtina in Rome with the inscription "blessed martyr Novation"; considered unverified by scholars because the inscription lacks the word "bishop"
355–365	Felix II; Saint Felix	Unknown	Church on Via Aurelia	Martyred and sainted; buried in a church of his making on the Via Aurelia according to Liber Pontificalis
366–367	Ursicinus	Unknown	Gaul	
418–419	Eulalius	Unknown	Unknown	Nothing known of death but year
498–499	Laurentius	Unknown	Unknown	Died on the farm of his patron Festus
530	Dioscorus	Unknown	Unknown	Memory was officially condemned by Pope Boniface II but reinstated by Pope Agapetus I
687	Theodore	Unknown	Unknown	Nothing known of him after his concession to Pope Sergius I
687	Paschal	Unknown	Unknown	Imprisoned in an unknown monastery until his death and buried in an unknown location
766–768	Constantine II	Unknown	Unknown	Died in an unknown monastery after much corporal mortification at the hands of the followers of Pope Stephen III
768	Philip	Unknown	Unknown	No historical references after his return to his Monastery of St. Vito (Rome)
844	John VIII	Unknown	Unknown	Nothing more known after he was confined to a monastery
855	Anastasius	Unknown	Unknown	
903–904	Christopher	Unknown	Old St. Peter's Basilica	Interred in Old St. Peter's by his overthrower, Pope Sergius III; destroyed in the seventeenth century demolition of Old St. Peter's; fragment of epitaph recorded by Peter Mallius
984–985	Boniface VII	Unknown	Unknown	Roman mob seized his corpse, stripped him of his vestments, dragged him through the streets, and deposited it at the feet of a statue of Marcus Aurelius on horseback, at which point he was trampled and stabbed; carried away by clerics at night and buried in an unknown location
997–998	John XVI	Unknown	Unknown	Bodily mutilated by Pope Gregory V and Otto III, Holy Roman Emperor and confined to a Roman monastery until his death
1012	Gregory VI	Unknown	Hamburg, Germany	Died in Hamburg; no documentation of funeral or monument exist
1058–1059	Benedict X	Unknown	Sant'Agnese in Agone	Sarcophagus in the crypt (not open to public) still contains his corpse
1061–1064	Honorius II	Unknown	Unknown	Died in Parma
1080	Clement III	Unknown	Unknown	Died in Civita Castellana
1100–1101	Theodoric	Unknown	Cava de' Tirreni	Died at La Trinità della Cava but buried in the local cemetery; tombstone contains the words "Theodoric, 1102"
1101	Adalbert	Unknown	Benedictine Abbey of San Lorenzo (Aversa)	
1105–1111	Sylvester IV	Unknown	Unknown	Died under the care of his patron, Count Werner of Ancona; nothing of death or burial known
1118–1121	Gregory VIII	Unknown	Unknown	Imprisoned in many places; last known to have been kept in Cava de' Tirreni, but it is unknown if he died there
1124	Celestine II	Unknown	Unknown	Not an antipope sensu stricto, because his election was legitimate; he was forced to resign a papacy a day after and subsequently submitted to the Pope Honorius II, who was elected in his place. Died from beating inflicted during the election.
1130–1138	Anacletus II	Unknown	Santa Maria in Trastevere	Destroyed by Pope Innocent II along with much of the church; Innocent II arranged for his own burial, in the rebuilt church, on the site of his former rivals'
1138	Victor IV	Unknown	Unknown (perhaps priorate of S. Eusebio in Fontanella)	Nothing known of his biography after his resignation
1159–1164	Victor IV	Unknown	Monastery in Lucca	The clergy of the Lucca Cathedral and San Frediano would not allow him buried there because of his excommunication; tomb destroyed by Pope Gregory VIII in December 1187
1164–1168	Paschal III	Unknown	Unknown	Died in Castel Sant'Angelo
1168–1178	Callixtus III	Unknown	Unknown	Died in Benevento
1179–1180	Innocent III	Unknown	La Trinità della Cava (Cava de' Tirreni)	
1328–1330	Nicholas V	Unknown	Avignon	Died in the Church of the Franciscans, Avignon
1378–1394	Clement VII	Perrin Morel	Musée du Petit Palais, Avignon	Original canopied tomb in the Avignon Cathedral moved on September 8, 1401, to the chapel of the Celestines, and in 1658 to the choir of the church; almost completely destroyed during the French Revolution, only the head of the effigy remains
1394–1417	Benedict XIII	Unknown	Castle of Illueca, Spain	Originally buried in the chapel crypt in Peñíscola; translated to Illueca, Spain and mummified under glass, attracting pilgrims; smashed by an Italian prelate Porro in 1537, after which the room was sealed by the archbishop of Saragossa; destroyed and desecrated by the French during the War of the Spanish Succession; skull recovered and put on display at the castle; buried in the palace of the Counts of Argillo y Morata at Sabinan in 1936 during the Spanish Civil War; skull stolen on August 23, 2000, by two brothers, who sent ransom notes to the Mayor of Illueca, Javier Vicente Inez; Spanish police recovered the skull and returned it to the Castle at Illueca on September 3, 2000
1409–1410	Alexander V	Niccolò di Piero Lamberti and Sperandio Savelli	San Francesco (Bologna)	Wall tomb
1410–1415	John XXIII	Donatello and Michelozzo	Florence Baptistry	See Tomb of Antipope John XXIII
1423–1429	Clement VIII	Unknown	La Seu (Mallorca)	Buried in the Cappella de la Piedad in the Cathedral of Palma, Spain
1424–1429	Benedict XIV	None	Under a rock in Armagnac, France	Refused burial in a church because of his excommunication
1430–1437	Benedict XIV	Unknown	Unknown	Died imprisoned in Château de Foix
1439–1449	Felix V Amadeus VIII, Count of Savoy	Unknown	Hautecombe Abbey (Ripaille, France)	Destroyed during the French Revolution; name listed on an extant memorial plaque that commemorates him and the other Counts of Savoy, whose tombs were also destroyed in the same Abbey
