= Quod scripsi, scripsi =

"What I have written, I have written", Pontius Pilate, Gospel of John (19:22)

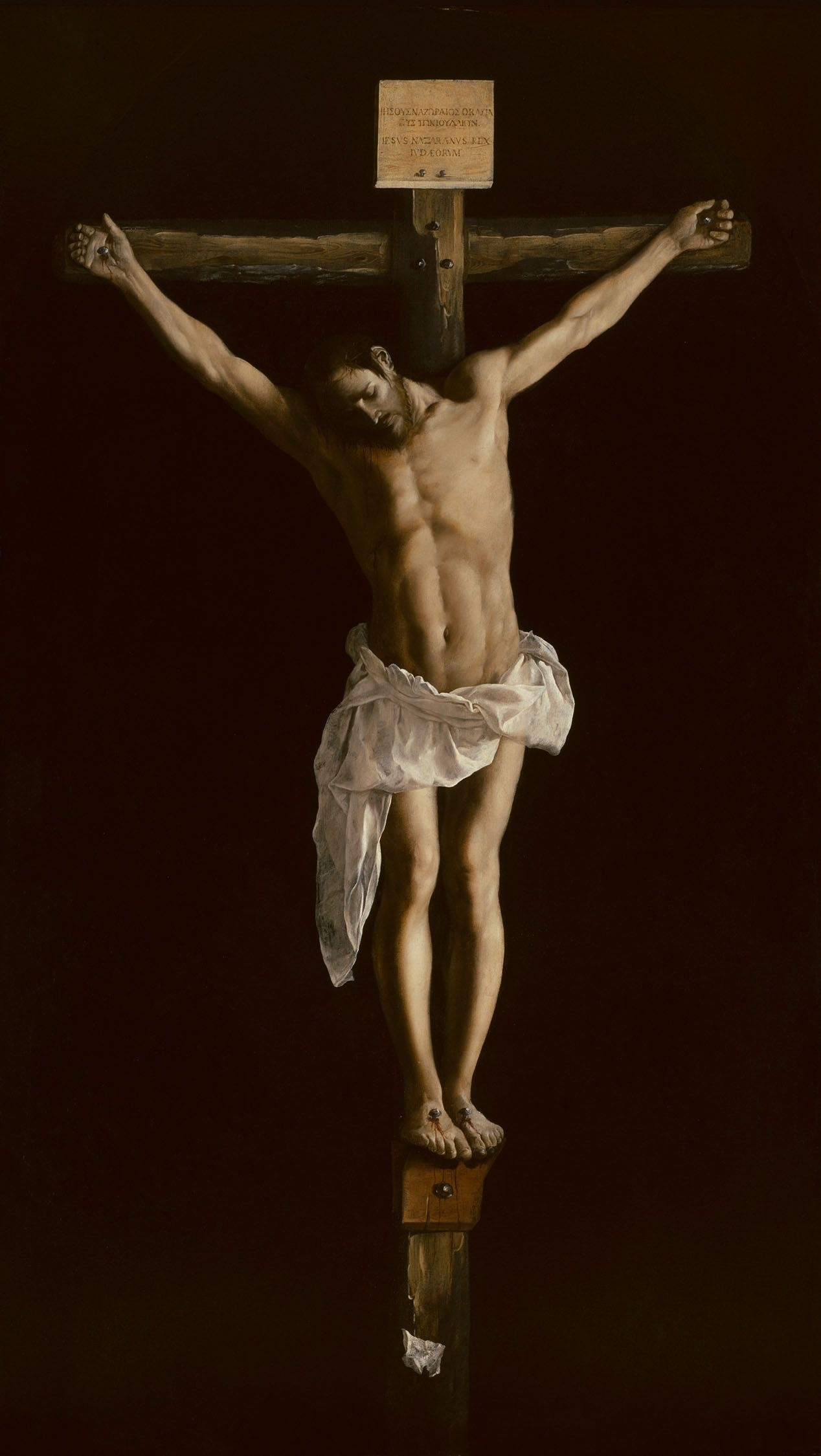
Christ on the Cross, by Francisco de Zurbarán, 1627. Pilate's superscription is nailed to the cross above Jesus.

Quod scripsi, scripsi (Latin for "What I have written, I have written") is a Latin phrase. It was most famously used by Pontius Pilate in the Bible in response to the Jewish priests who objected to his writing "King of the Jews" on the sign (titulus) that was hung above Jesus at his Crucifixion. It is mostly found in the Latin Vulgate Bible.

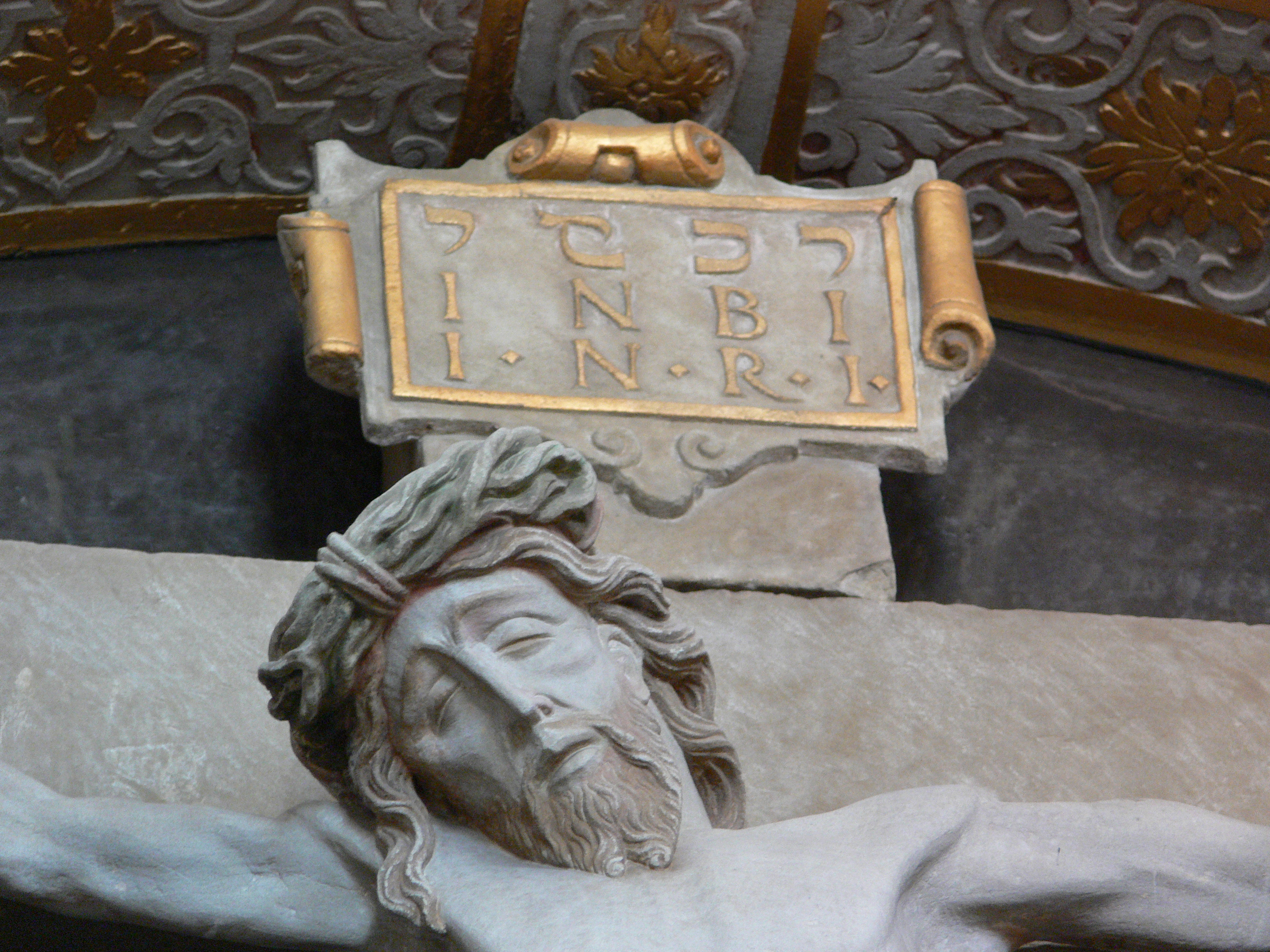
The acronym INRI ("Jesus of Nazareth, King of the Jews") written in three languages (as in John 19:20) and affixed to the cross; Ellwangen Abbey, Germany

== History ==
The phrase appears in the Bible in John 19:20–22. When Jesus was sent to be crucified, Pilate wrote the sign to be hung above Jesus on the cross. He wrote "Jesus the Nazarene, King of the Jews" in Hebrew (or, perhaps, Aramaic.) Latin and Koine Greek. The Jewish priests voiced their objections of this to Pilate, stating that Jesus had only claimed the title and they did not recognise Him as such. They said to Pilate, "Do not write King of the Jews, but that he said: 'I am the King of the Jews'." Pilate responded to them sternly with "Quod scripsi, scripsi" (Greek: Ὃ γέγραφα γέγραφα, Ho gegrapha gegrapha). This was interpreted by Jerome as an allusion to the headings of Psalm 56 and Psalm 57, which in the Vulgate seem to refer to an inscription that is not to be changed.

The scene where Pilate says "Quod scripsi, scripsi" was not covered in art or discussion as a popular subject. Aside of the Bury St. Edmunds Cross there was little discussion on it in the pre-Reformation Christian Church. It was suggested that this may have been because it is only mentioned in detail by John the Evangelist and because it was mentioned in the apocryphal Acts of Pilate.

== Other uses ==
In 1306, when Henry II of Jerusalem signed a patent to give the Kingdom of Cyprus to the governorship of Amalric, Lord of Tyre, the marshal of the temple accompanying Amalric reportedly said "Quod scripsi, scripsi" with disdain to Henry when he signed the patent.

On being released from imprisonment in 1418, Antipope John XXIII came, broken down and destitute, to Florence, and was given asylum there by Giovanni di Bicci de' Medici, who, when the deposed Pope died in the following year, erected to his memory the tomb which is to be seen in the Florence Baptistery. When the inscription was put up (after Giovanni's death), Pope Martin V objected to the words "Quandam Papa" (former Pope) and wrote to the Signoria demanding that they should be erased. The reply was a refusal, written by Cosimo de' Medici, and couched in the words of Pontius Pilate, saying, "Quod scripsi, scripsi."

The philosopher Immanuel Kant used a play on "Quod scripsi, scripsi" in response to critics of his Metaphysics of Morals, using "Quod scripsi, scribentes" (What I have written, I am writing).
