= Tomb of Antipope John XXIII =

1420s work by Donatello and Michelozzo in Florence, Italy

Coordinates: 43°46′23″N 11°15′18″E

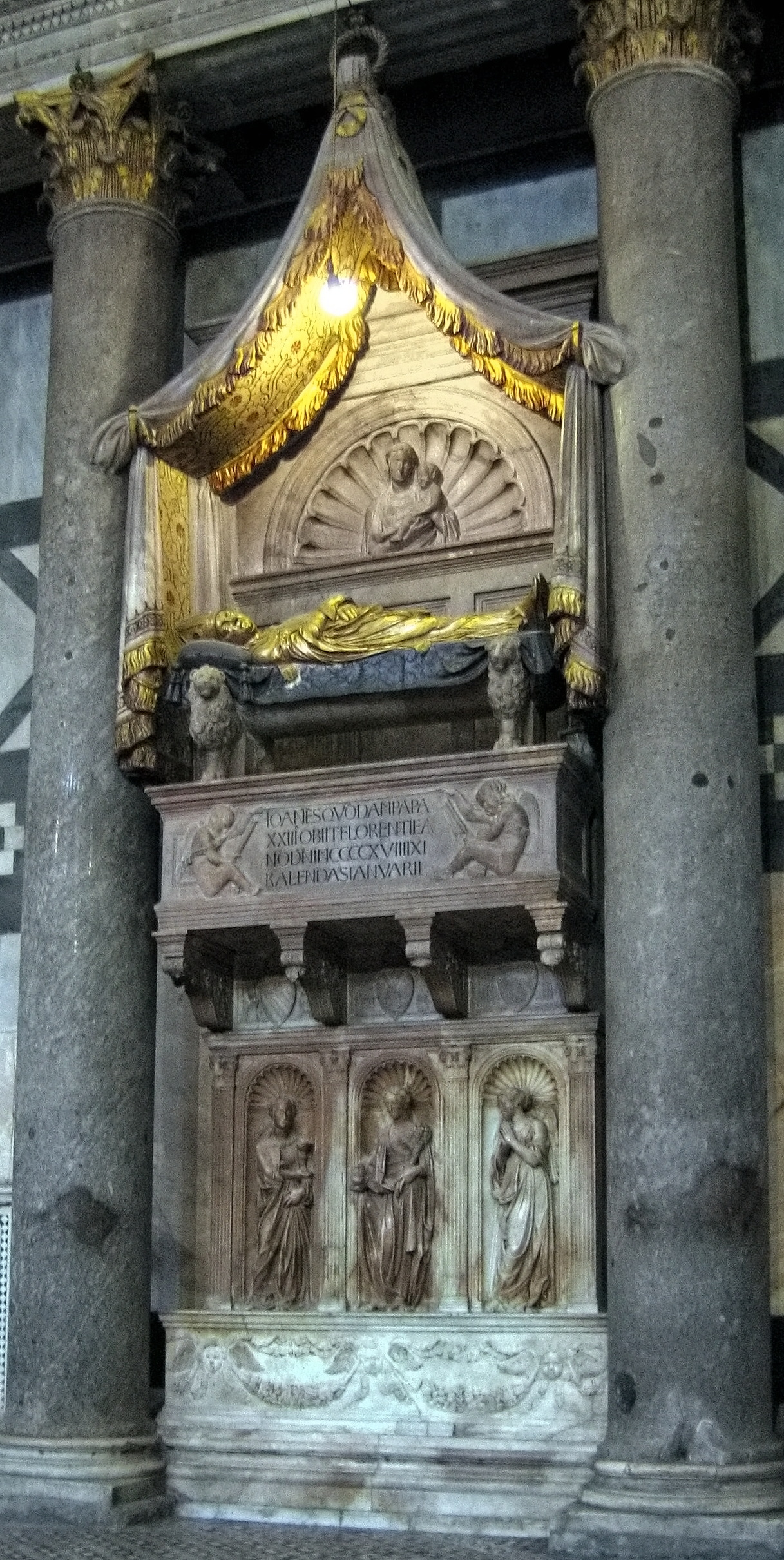
Tomb of Antipope John XXIII

The marble-and-bronze tomb monument of Antipope John XXIII (Baldassare Cossa, c. 1360–1419) was created by Donatello and Michelozzo for the Florence Baptistry adjacent to the Duomo. It was commissioned by the executors of Cossa's will after his death on 22 December 1419, and completed during the 1420s, establishing it as one of the early landmarks of Renaissance Florence. According to Ferdinand Gregorovius, the tomb is "at once the sepulchre of the Great Schism in the church and the last papal tomb which is outside Rome itself".

Cossa had a long history; the tomb and the linkage between Cossa and Florence have been interpreted as a snub to Cossa's successor Pope Martin V or vicarious "Medici self-promotion", as such a tomb would have been deemed unacceptable for a Florentine citizen.

The tomb monument's design included figures of the three Virtues in niches, Cossa's family arms, a gilded bronze recumbent effigy laid out above an inscription-bearing sarcophagus supported on corbel brackets, and above it a Madonna and Child in a half-lunette, with a canopy over all. At the time of its completion, the monument was the tallest sculpture in Florence, and one of very few tombs within the Baptistry of the neighboring Duomo. The tomb monument was the first of several collaborations between Donatello and Michelozzo, and the attribution of its various elements to each of them has been debated by art historians, as have the interpretations of its design and iconography.

== Antipope John XXIII ==
Antipope John XXIII had a complicated life, legacy, and relationship with the city of Florence. Baldassare Cossa was a Neapolitan nobleman who grew up in Bologna. Pope Boniface IX elevated Cossa to the Archdiocese of Bologna in 1396 and made him a cardinal in 1402. After the Council of Pisa in 1409, Cossa encouraged rebellion against Pope Gregory XII, who refused to resign. Cossa was deprived of his cardinalate, but it was restored by Antipope Alexander V, who had been elected by the council.

Cossa succeeded Alexander V as John XXIII in 1410. John XXIII was acknowledged as pope by France, England, Bohemia, Prussia, Portugal, parts of the Holy Roman Empire, and numerous Northern Italian city states, including Florence and Venice; however, the Avignon Pope Benedict XIII was regarded as pope by the Kingdoms of Aragon, Castile, and Scotland and Gregory XII was still favored by King Ladislaus of Naples, Carlo I Malatesta, the princes of Bavaria, Elector Louis III of the Palatinate, and parts of Germany and Poland.

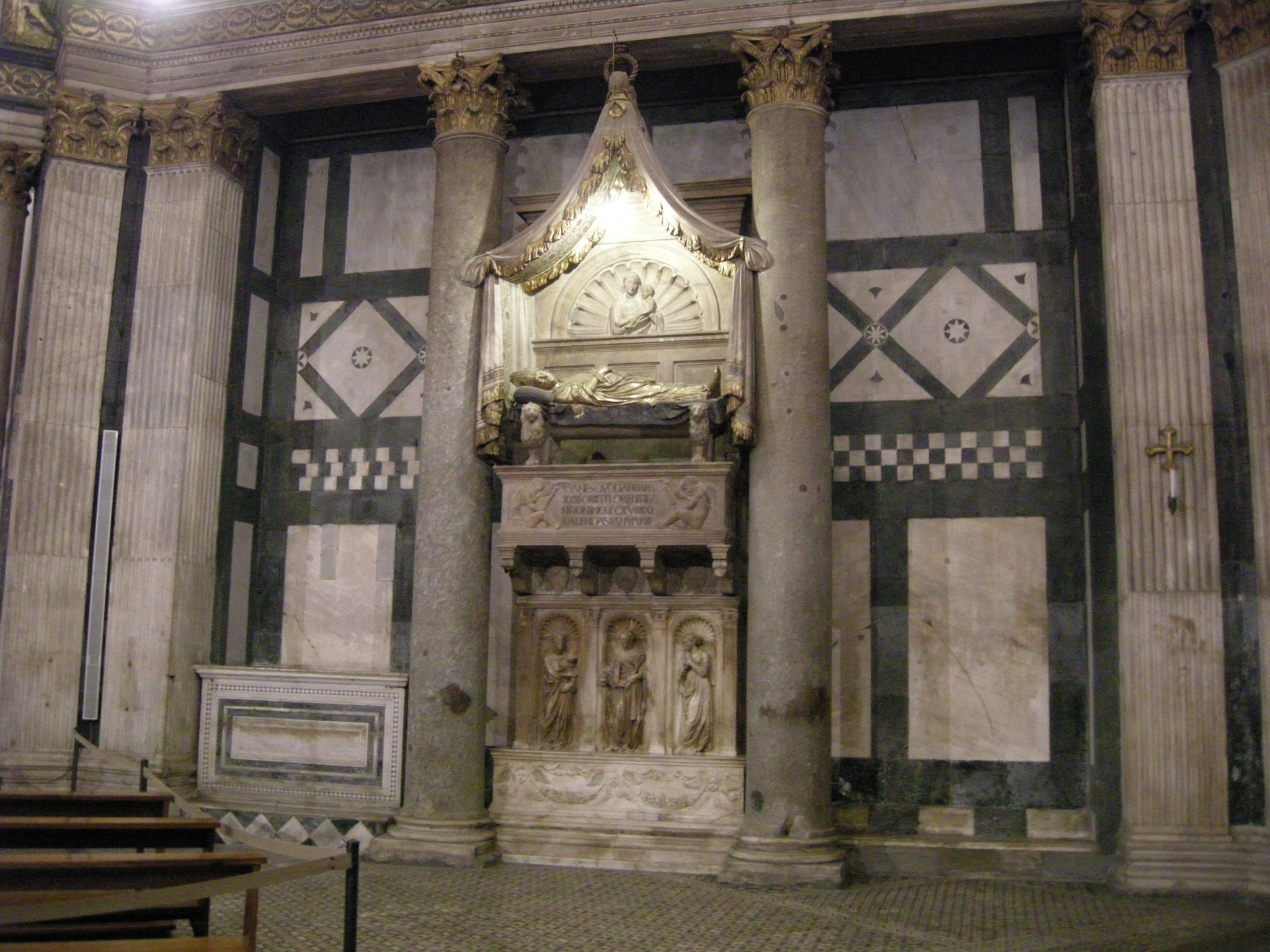
Wider view

When Ladislaus of Naples conquered Rome in 1413, John XXIII was forced to flee to Florence. He was compelled by Emperor Sigismund to convoke the Council of Constance in 1414, although when the threat to his pontificate and possibly his person became apparent, he fled in 1415. Although he expected his departure would disperse the council, the members of which he called to join him under the protection of Duke Frederick IV of Austria, it continued to operate where they were. As John XXIII tried to make his way towards the territory of Duke John the Fearless of Burgundy, Frederick IV surrendered him to the custody of Sigismund and the Council, and he was imprisoned by Louis III.

In the meantime, the Council deposed John XXIII on 29 May 1415, and elected Pope Martin V on 11 November 1417; Martin V proceeded to Florence in February 1419. Cossa was ransomed by the Republic of Florence in 1419 (Louis III had abandoned the allegiance of Sigismund in 1417), as orchestrated by Giovanni di Bicci de' Medici. His ransom may have been a reward for past assistance to Florence, or a manoeuvre to put pressure on Martin V (still in Florence; he would arrive in Rome in September 1420), or both. Cossa had helped Florence conquer Pisa in 1405 in his capacity as Papal legate to Bologna and, as pope, had designated the Medici bank as the depository-general for the papal finances.

In Florence, Cossa submitted to Martin V on 14 June 1419, and was rewarded with a cardinal's hat on 26 June, only to die on 22 December. Although given the title of Cardinal Bishop of Tusculum, Cossa called himself "Cardinal of Florence".

=== Funeral ===
Cossa's body was moved to the Baptistry and the nine-day funeral, as prescribed by the Ordo Romanus, was well-attended by the Florentine elite and the papal court. Cossa's corpse was crowned with a white mitre with his cardinal's hat at his feet on the funerary bier during the rituals, which took place entirely within the Baptistry and Duomo. The first three days of ceremonies celebrated in turn Cossa's role as cardinal and pope, his role as an ally of Florence, and his role as a private citizen. He received a temporary burial until the tomb was complete.

== Commissioning ==
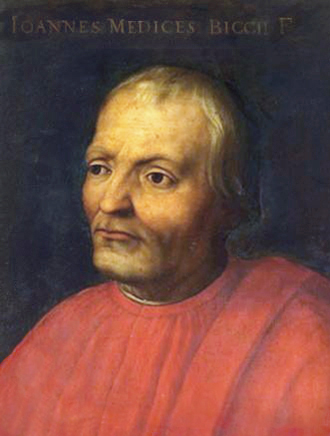
Giovanni di Bicci de' Medici, one of the executors of Cossa's will

The commissioning of Cossa's tomb monument was negotiated for about a decade following Cossa's death. Cossa's last will and testament—written on his death bed on 22 December 1419—made several of the customary Florentine civic bequests, acts of charity, and traditional ecclesiastical courtesies, but the bulk of his estate was left to his nephews Michele and Giovanni. The bequests to his nephews took priority, and his estate remained disputed by various creditors while the tomb was being completed.

Cossa designated four prominent Florentines as his executors: Bartolommeo di Taldo Valori, Niccolò da Uzzano, Giovanni di Bicci de' Medici, and Vieri Guadagni, allowing any two of the executors to act on behalf of all four, as Valori and Medici appear to have done. Valori died on 2 September 1427, by which time Guadagni was also deceased and Uzzano had long lost interest, leaving the remaining work of commissioning entirely to Giovanni, or—more likely—Cosimo de' Medici.

The executors claimed that Cossa had revealed his desire for burial in the Baptistry to them but had been too modest to request it in his will. Most later scholars accept this testimony of the executors, attributing Cossa with "tact—and tactics", although at least one has postulated that the executors chose the site of the Baptistry against Cossa's wishes.

Cossa willed a relic, believed to be the right index finger of John the Baptist, to the Baptistry (reliquary pictured).

Documentary records indicate that, on 9 January 1421, Palla Strozzi, on behalf of the Arte di Calimala, the guild who were responsible for the upkeep of the Baptistry, authorized a "breve et honestissima" ("small and inconspicuous") monument in the Baptistry, but not the chapel requested by Cossa's will; present scholarship accepts Strozzi's assertion that burial within the Baptistry was a considerable honor, perhaps beyond the status of Cossa. After this meeting, there are no extant records from the Calimala regarding the tomb as the bulk of documents from the 1420s have been lost, although the notes of Senatore Carlo Strozzi, who went through the records, are extant.

The Calimala's acquiescence is traditionally explained by Cossa's donation of the relic of the right index finger of John the Baptist (and 200 florins for an appropriate reliquary) to the Baptistry. With this finger John was believed to have pointed to Jesus, saying "Ecce Agnus Dei" ("Behold the lamb of God") in John 1:29. The long and complicated history of the relic would only have increased the legendary status of the finger: Philotheus Kokkinos, Patriarch of Constantinople presented it in 1363 to Pope Urban V, who passed it to his successors Gregory XI and Urban VI, who was dispossessed of it during the siege of Nocera, after which John XXIII bought it for 800 florins and wore it on his person before hiding it in the monastery of Santa Maria degli Angeli.

== Completion ==
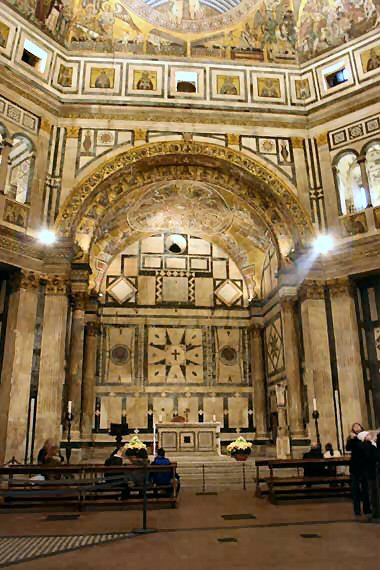
The Tomb was designed to integrate with the interior of the Florence Baptistry.

The chronology of the tomb monument's completion is not precisely known, but portions can be determined from various sources. According to the passing reference of a Florentine notary, in 1424 (by the Florentine calendar) part of the tomb was installed. Michelozzo's Catasto from July 1427 indicates that Michelozzo had been Donatello's partner for about two years ("due anni o incircha") and that three-fourths of the 800 florin budget had been spent. To harmonize these accounts, one must conclude either that Michelozzo's chronology was imprecise, that Donatello received the commission before the partnership was formed, or that the 1424 date in the Florentine calendar falls in 1425 in the modern calendar.

On 2 February 1425, Bartolomeo Valori and Cosimo de' Medici requested 400 of the 800 florins that had been deposited with the Calimala, likely for work already completed. This deposit was insurance in case the executors left the tomb unfinished and the Calimala was forced to pay for its completion, as it had been obliged to with the finger reliquary. This request is also the most direct piece of evidence for Cosimo's involvement with the commissioning. Despite this document, Vasari's claim in his Vite of 1550 that Cosimo was responsible for the handling of the commission has been questioned.

It is probable that the sarcophagus was installed on or shortly before 2 May 1426, when the Calimala contracted for two chaplains to say a daily mass for Cossa's soul. The records of the Duomo workshop indicate that on 28 January 1427, Valori bought four white marble blocks for the tomb.

The exact date of completion is unknown but it must have been finished before the death of Pope Martin V in 1431, who is known to have visited the completed tomb. Other indicators may push this date back significantly into the 1420s. The most reliable of these is that in September 1428 Jacopo della Quercia returned to Bologna and produced a wall tomb with Virtues reflecting in minute details the Cossa Virtues.

Vasari suggests that the tomb went over budget, costing 1,000 florins, although it is unclear who covered the excess. Although the original source for this claim is unknown, it has gained credence with modern scholars as the effigy alone would have cost 500 florins, yet its exactness may be taken with a grain of salt.

== Design ==
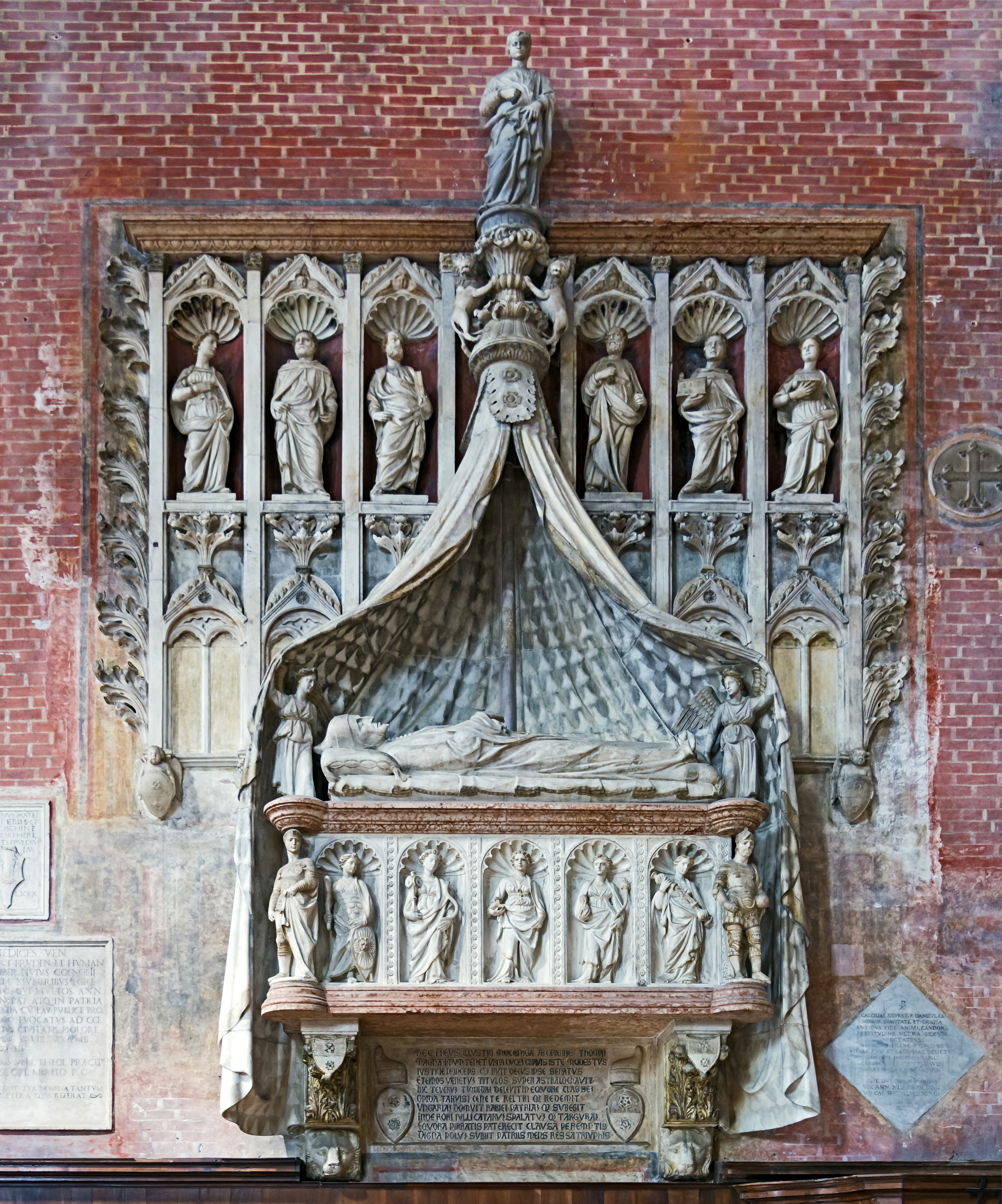
The closely contemporary Venetian tomb of Doge Tommaso Mocenigo, of 1423

The Baptistry already contained three sarcophagi: those of Bishop Ranieri (d. 1113) and two reused Roman sarcophagi. However, the tomb monument, which is 7.32 metres (24.02 ft) high, was easily the tallest monument in the Baptistry, and—at the time—in Florence. The Duomo contains few tombs, with some notable exceptions, such as that of Aldobrandino Ottobuoni.

The tomb monument adapted to the conditions imposed by the Calimala and integrated with the interior of the Baptistry. The wall tomb was required to be placed between two existing Corinthian columns—those between Ghiberti's North Doors and the western tribune—constituting one-third of one of the octagonal walls, near the altar and facing Ghiberti's East Doors. The setting starves the tomb monument of light, especially when the Baptistry's doors are closed, which is normally the case. It would be even darker were it not for the "screen" back wall protruding 48.4 centimetres (19.1 in) from the Baptistry wall. The white and brown (and whitish-brown) marble further integrates the structure with the polychromatic white and green of the Baptistry interior. Some scholars accept the colored sketch of Buonaccorso Ghirberti as evidence that the "original effaced polychromy" of the tomb was more integrated, although others contend that the sketch is too inaccurate. The canopy's interaction with the columns and conceit of being supported by the Baptistry cornice make the tomb monument further "wedded to the architecture" around it, even if the marriage is morganatic. Apart from the effigy on the sarcophagus, all the other sculpted figures are in high relief.

Although the style of the work is thoroughly classicising, the overall form reflects the grandest type of the medieval Italian wall tomb, in which the vertical piling-up of a series of different elements is characteristic. Italian Gothic sculpture always retained considerable elements of classicism, and it was not necessary for Donatello and Michelozzo to adopt a radically original overall scheme from those of Tino di Camaino (c. 1285–1337), the Siennese sculptor whose wall-tombs of a century before had been very influential throughout Italy. A life-size marble effigy lying on top of an elevated protruding sarcophagus is highly typical. The motif of curtains at the top is often found in monuments using Gothic decorative details, and the shape recalls the triangular gable tops of monuments in a more thoroughly Gothic style; other monuments have curtains, often held open by angels, around the effigy, and then sculptures above. The Cossa monument is often compared to the monument to Doge Tommaso Mocenigo of Venice, of 1423, which has high relief saints in shell niches on and above the sarcophagus, above which a large pair of curtains sweep up to a single terminal; however the architectural detailing here is Gothic. The design of the Cossa tomb itself was elaborated on, and adapted to local conventions, in the tomb by the same team for Cardinal Brancacci in Naples, and influenced the monument to Leonardo Bruni by Bernardo Rossellino, of about 20 years later, in the Basilica of Santa Croce, Florence.

=== Base ===
The base slab, or pylon, of the tomb monument rests on a 38-centimetre (15 in) high plinth, separated by a cornice and concave mouldings. The pylon is 1.39 metres (4.56 ft) high and 2.02 metres (6.63 ft) wide, decorated with a frieze of winged angel heads (perhaps seraphim) and garlands and ribbons.

=== Virtues ===
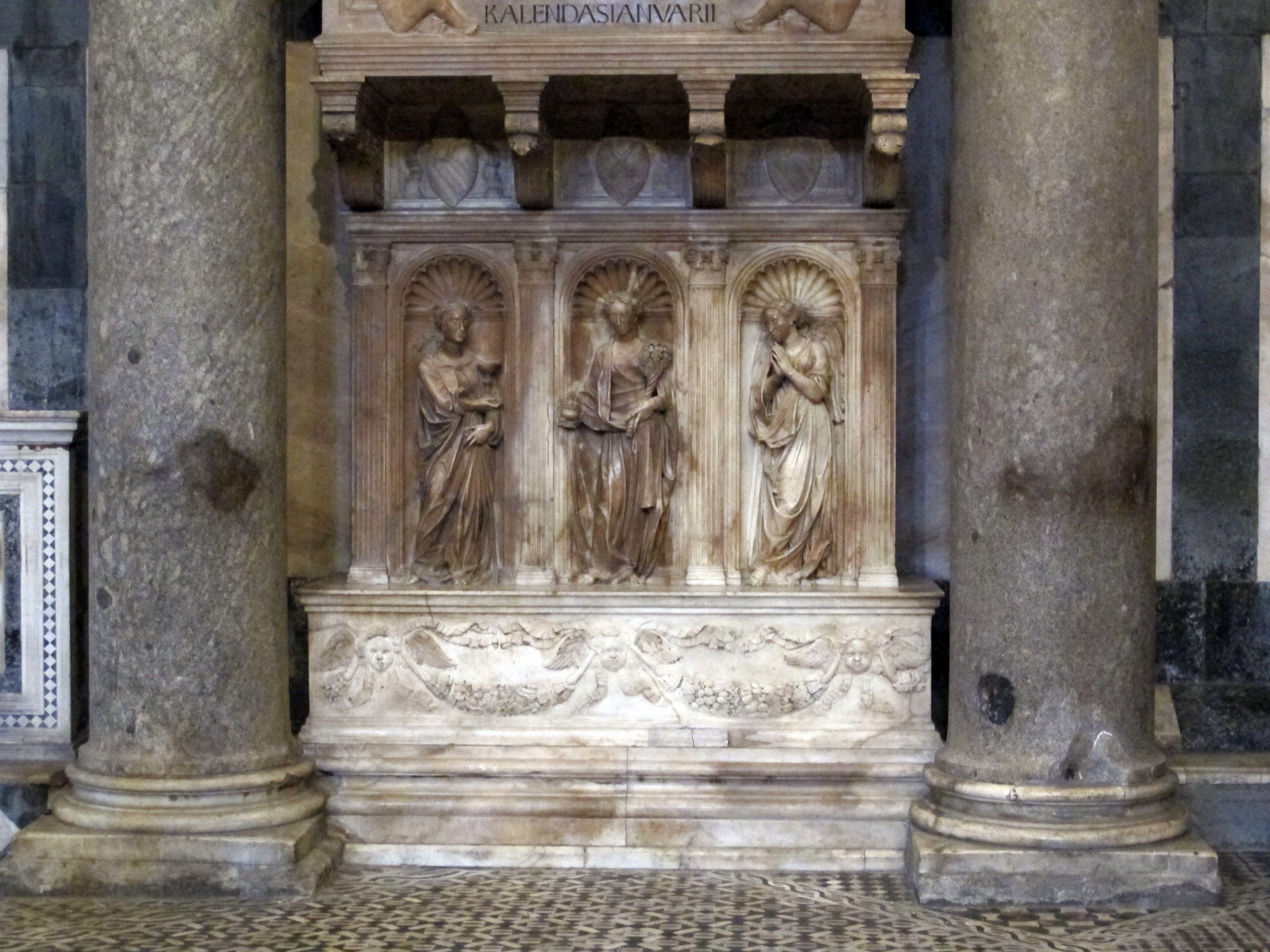
Virtues by Michelozzo

Above the pylon, separated by the cornice, are the three Virtues—from left to right, Faith, Charity, and Hope—in shell niches, separated by four Corinthian fluted pilasters. Such a motif is unprecedented in Tuscan funerary sculpture but found at this date in Venice, Padua, and especially Cossa's native Naples. As a result, excursions to Venice have been suggested for both Michelozzo and Donatello. However, Janson suggests that one "need not go all the way to Venice" to find such motifs. Outside Florence, Virtues were common on tombs, with the cardinal Virtues used for laymen, and the theological virtues reserved for ecclesiastics, including the Brancaccio tomb. However, the Cossa Virtues, from their hair to their sandals, are more thoroughly antique. Donatello also produced two similar bronze Virtues for the Siena Baptistry, whose chronological relationship to the Cossa Virtues is unclear.

The 1.05-metre (3.44 ft) tall Faith, to the right of Charity, is holding a Eucharistic chalice; the 1.07-metre (3.51 ft) tall Charity is holding a cornucopia and a brazier (or flaming vase); and the 1.06-metre (3.48 ft) tall Hope, to the left of Charity, has hands clasped in prayer. The central figure of Charity is the most antique, assimilating elements of Classical depictions of Abundantia, Ceres, and Juno, all of which were depicted with cornucopias in their left hands. Besides underscoring the antiquity of the tomb monument, the main purpose of the tall yet poorly finished Virtues is to put additional vertical distance between the viewer and the effigy, which has the cumulative effect of de-emphasizing the peculiarities of Cossa, in favor of a generic pontiff (i.e. a potential line of Florentine popes), by blunting the "immediacy" of the trope of lying in state, which was otherwise dominant on Quattrocento wall tombs.

=== Sarcophagus and inscription ===
Above the Virtues, four classical consoles decorated with acanthus leaves support the sarcophagus. In the tripartite space between the consoles—from left to right—are Cossa's family arms with the papal tiara, the papal coat of arms, and Cossa's family arms with the cardinal's hat. The rilievo schiacciato (a type of very shallow bas-relief pioneered by Donatello) on the architrave sarcophagus (2.12-metre (6.96 ft) wide and 0.7-metre (2.30 ft) high) depicts two putti or spiratelli ("little spirits") holding open a large inscribed parchment, perhaps in the style of a papal brief. The putti (or spiratelli) share many characteristics with their ancient counterparts, except for their crossed legs.

The inscription reads:

IOANnES QVOnDAM PAPA
XXIIIus. OBIIT FLORENTIE A
NnO DomiNI MCCCCXVIIII XI
KALENDAS IANVARII

Which translates to:

John the former pope
XXIII. Died in Florence
A.D. 1419, on 11th
day before the Calends of January

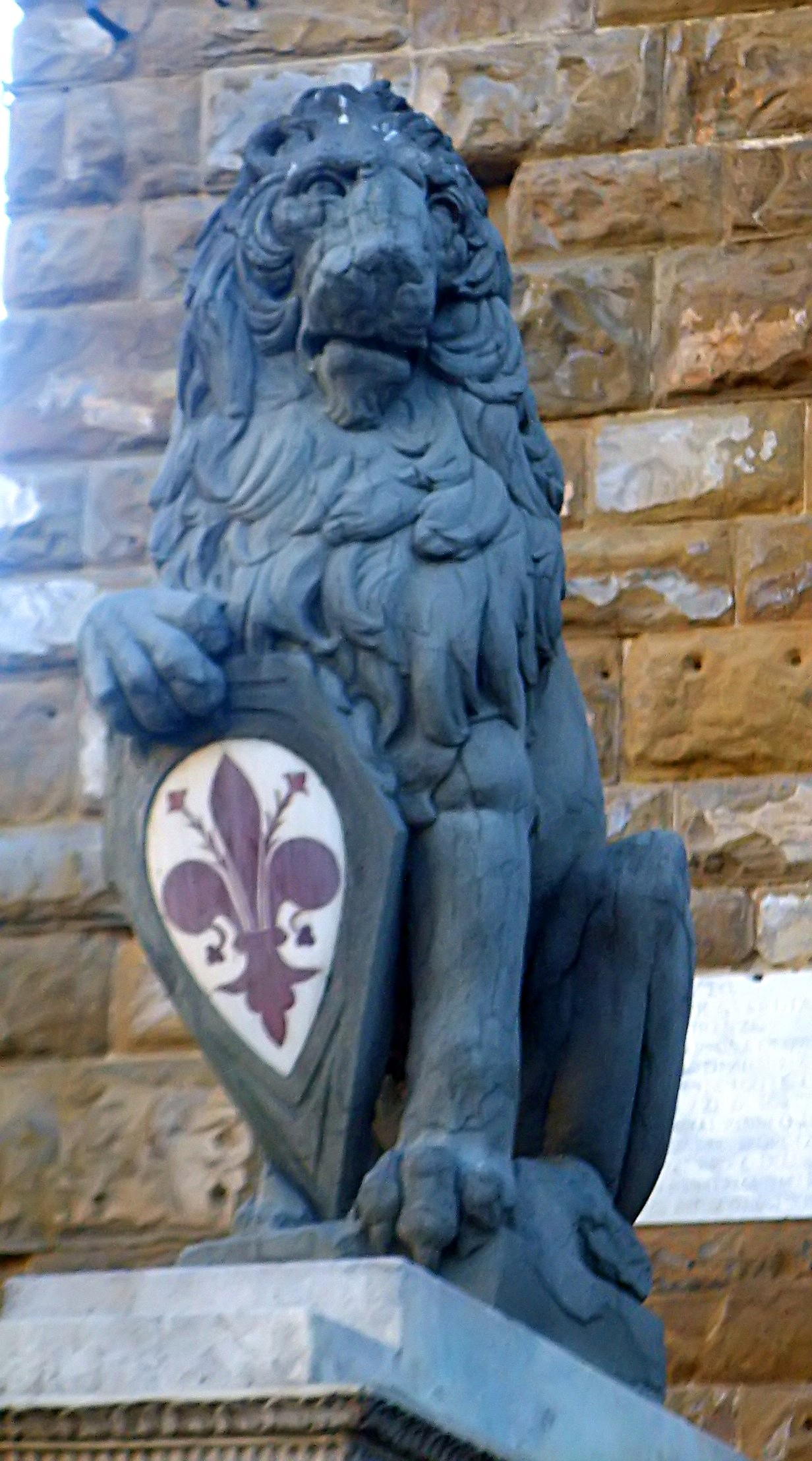
The Marzocco was a symbol of Florentine rule.

Pope Martin V objected to a portion of the inscription—"IOANnES QVOnDAM PAPA"—because he thought it implied Cossa had died as pope (the Latin "quondam" could mean either "the former" or "the late"). The use of "olim Papa", as was common in many contemporary documents, instead of "quondam Papa" would probably have removed Martin V's objections. Martin himself suggested instead that Cossa be identified as a Neapolitan cardinal, thus emphasizing instead his submission. Contemporary sources report that the Signoria mimicked the reply of Pontius Pilate regarding the inscription on the cross of Christ: "Quod scripsi, scripsi" ("What I have written, I have written.") Martin V himself was buried underneath an undecorated bronze floor slab, the only known example of a two-dimensional papal monument, although also the first to be set in the central nave of a major basilica, the Basilica of St. John Lateran in Rome, and cast in bronze.

According to Avery, Donatello's Ascension of Christ and the Giving of the Keys to St. Peter may have been intended to share the front of the sarcophagus, further strengthening the papal associations, which were created by dating Cossa's death using the ancient Roman Calends of January, which was uncommon on Florentine tombs, but was used in papal ones.

=== Effigy ===
On top of the sarcophagus, the bier of the effigy is supported by lions whose shape mimics Trecento consoles. The lions may be based on the Florentine Marzocco, as if to mark John XXIII in the same manner as a conquered city-state. As Donatello's Marzocco for the papal apartment in Santa Maria Novella conveyed Florence's ambivalence towards Martin V (as both a source of prestige by visiting, and a potential adversary of the Republic), the lions supporting the bier contextualize the tomb monument's support for John XXIII's claim to the papacy by cementing it as a Florentine claim. Yet, any iconographical interpretation of the lions must be taken with a grain of salt as lions are symbolically promiscuous, and are also seen as supports on earlier tombs, such as that of Lapo de' Bardi (d. 1342) in the Bargello.

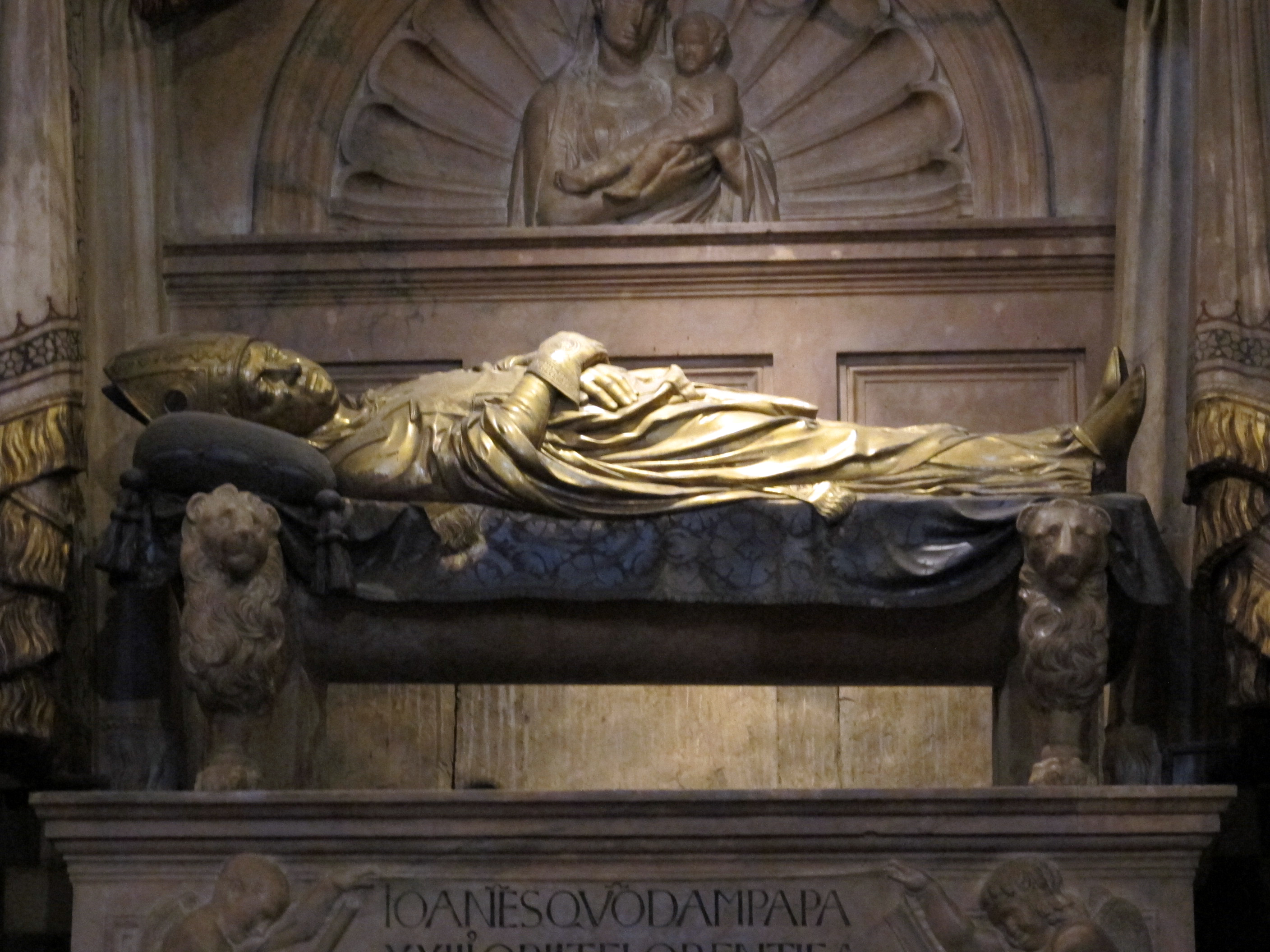
The sarcophagus with the antipope gisant (effigy)

The bier and the pall spread over it are tilted towards the viewer with the lion supporting the head standing 2-centimetre (1 in) shorter, increasing the visibility of the effigy, especially the head. The gilded-bronze, life-size effigy itself makes no attempt to argue for Cossa's papal status, dressing Cossa clearly in the costume of a cardinal; the bedding it rests on is of un-gilt bronze. The opening in the 16th century of the sarcophagus confirmed that Cossa's actual burial clothes matched the effigy. There was no precedent for a three-dimensional gilded-bronze effigy on an Italian tomb monument; there was, however, a 6-foot (1.83 m) gilt bronze statue on the balcony of the Palazzo della Briada in Bologna commissioned by Pope Boniface VIII.

Some scholars suggest that Donatello created the effigy with the aid of a death mask, but others disagree.

=== Canopy ===
Behind the effigy is a 1.34-metre (4.40 ft) tripartite pylon with sunk molded borders supporting the cornice and framed by two additional Corinthian pilasters. Above it rests an entablature of the Madonna and Child on a half-lunette, a typical—symbolizing intercession—motif for a tomb. Above the effigy and Madonna is a gilt-edged architectonic canopy decorated with patterned stemmed flowers, giving the conceit of being supported by the ribbed brass ring, an impossibility given its weight. McHam suggests that the canopy is based on the "Dome of Heaven", and thus the baldacchino of papal enthronement. However, Lightbown is emphatic that the double-summited canopy looped against the pillars is not a baldacchino, but rather a secular bed-canopy.

== Attribution ==
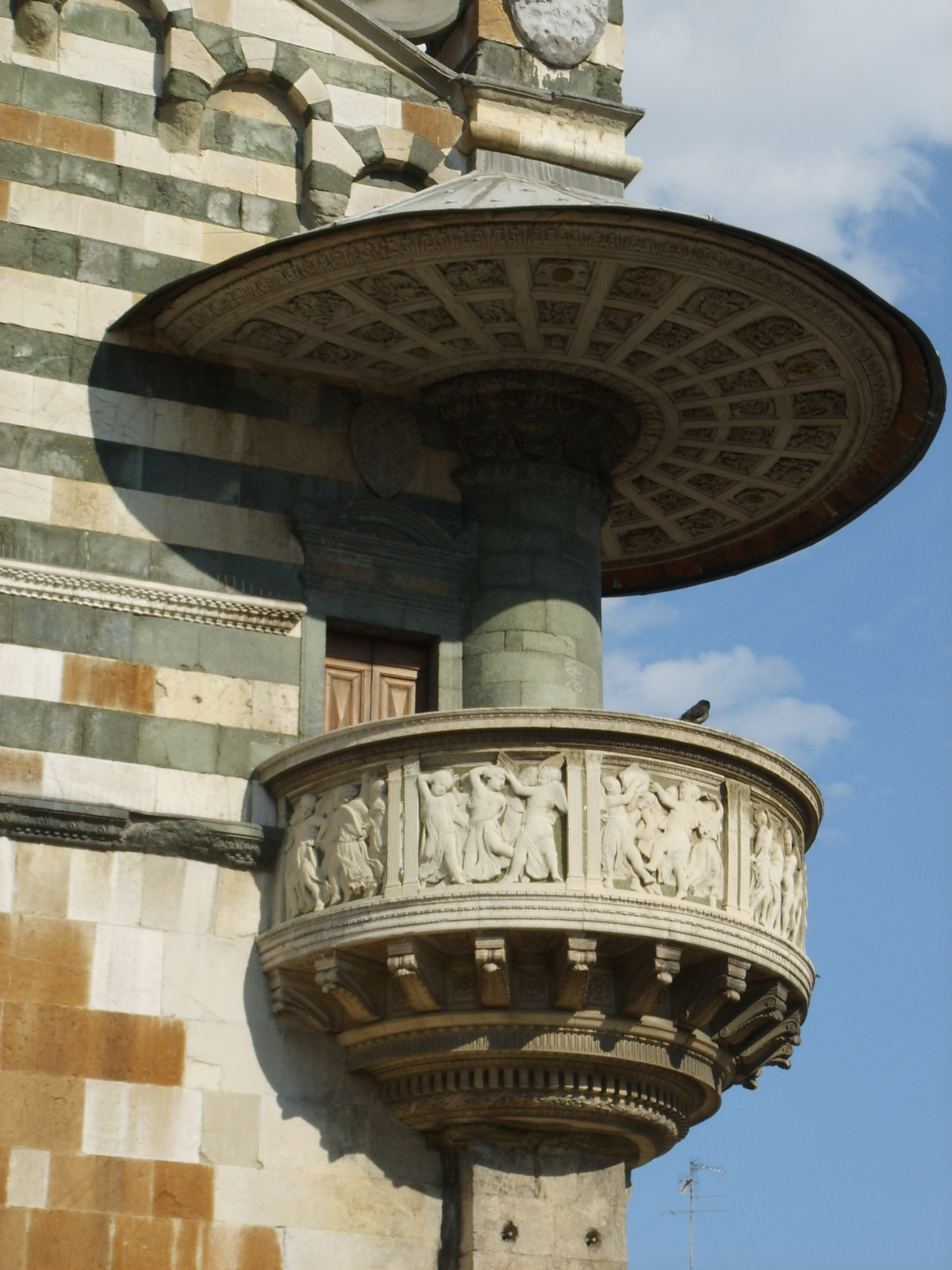
The external pulpit for the Duomo of Prato, another collaboration of Donatello and Michelozzo

The tomb monument was the first collaboration between Donatello and Michelozzo, who went on to collaborate on the tomb of Cardinal Rainaldo Brancacci in the Church of Sant'Angelo a Nilo in Naples, the tomb of Papal Secretary Bartolomeo Aragazzi in what is now the Duomo of Montepulciano, and the external pulpit of the Duomo of Prato. At the time of their partnership, Donatello was already well known for his statues of prophets and saints for the Duomo and Orsanmichele, while Michelozzo was more obscure. Both had worked for a time for Ghiberti, whose workshop then led Florentine sculpture.

Nearly every element of the tomb monument has been attributed to both Donatello and Michelozzo by different art historians. These characterizations are mostly of historiographical interest: attribution to Donatello is more of an indication of what is valued by each commentator than any objective criteria; often, aspects are attributed to Michelozzo explicitly because they are "less well executed".

Descriptions from 1475 to 1568 attribute all of the tomb except for the figure of Faith to Donatello. Some modern sources reverse this dichotomy, attributing all of the tomb to Michelozzo with the exception of the gilded bronze effigy. Some sources credit Donatello only with the bronze effigy. According to Janson, of the marble work, only the putti can be attributed to "Donatello's own hand". Donatello's alleged deficiencies in casting or in architecture have been proposed as the reason for his partnership with Michelozzo, in addition to his busy schedule.
