= Filippo Gnaccarini =

Italian sculptor (1804–1875)

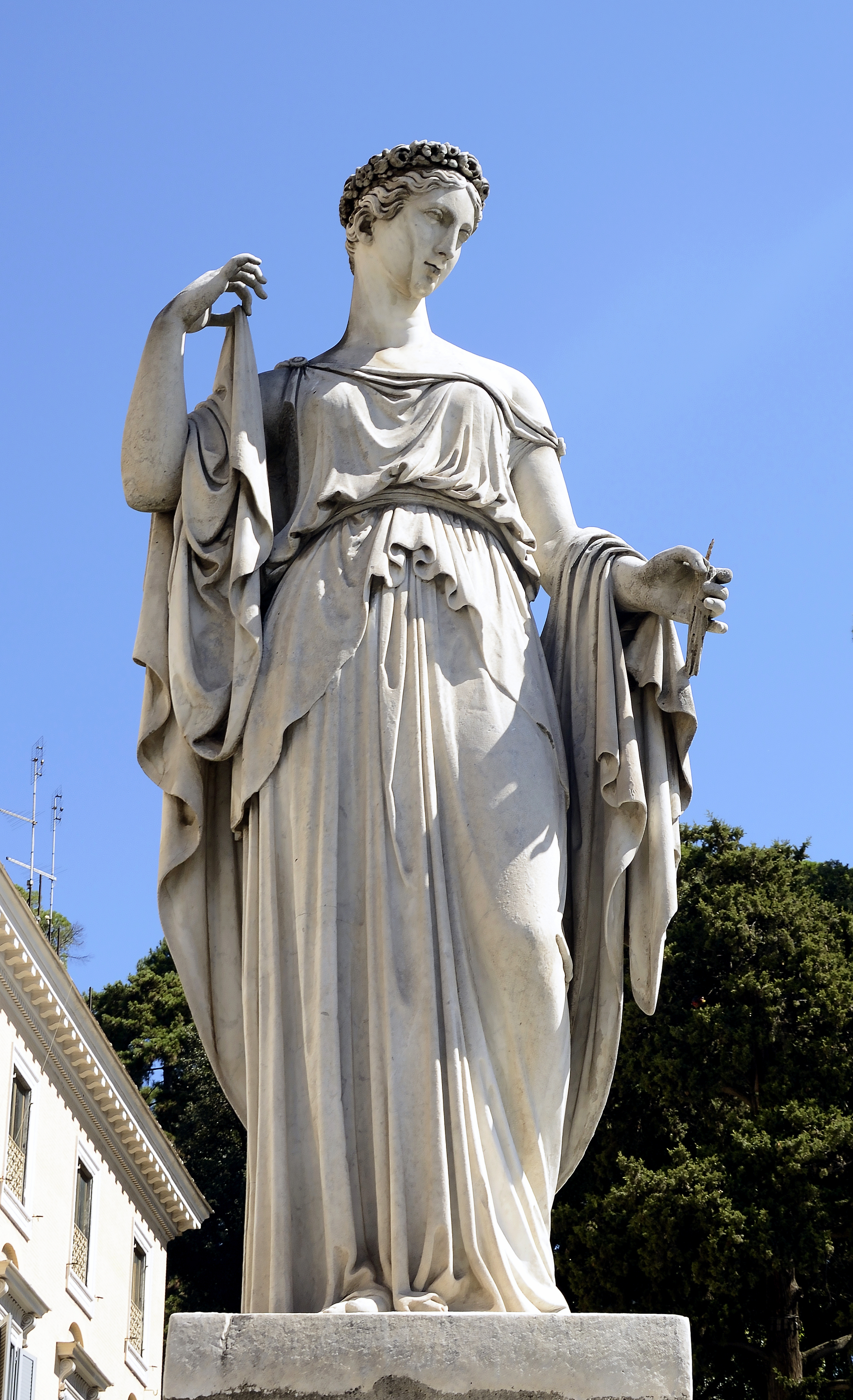
Primavera, Piazza del Popolo, Rome

Filippo Gnaccarini, sometimes referred to as Gnaccherini (24 May 1804, Rome – 16 March 1875, Rome) was an Italian sculptor who was active in Rome in the 19th century.

== Sources ==
- Trier, Dankmar (2021). "Gnaccarini, Filippo". In Beyer, Andreas; Savoy, Bénédicte; Tegethoff, Wolf (eds.). Allgemeines Künstlerlexikon – Internationale Künstlerdatenbank (online ed.). Berlin, New York: K. G. Saur. Retrieved 10 April 2023.
