= Vespignani =

Vespignani is an Italian surname. Notable people with the surname include:

- Alessandro Vespignani (born 1965), Italian physicist
- Renzo Vespignani (1924–2001), Italian painter, printmaker and illustrator
- Virginio Vespignani (1808–1882), Italian architect
- Netta Vespignani, a painter and the father of Veronica Gentili
