= Antipope Sylvester IV =

Claimant to the Papacy from 1105 to 1111

Sylvester IV
- Papacy began: 1105
- Papacy ended: 1111
- Predecessor: Adalbert (as antipope); Paschal II (as pope)
- Successor: Paschal II (as pope)
- Opposed to: Paschal II

Sylvester IV, born Maginulf, was a claimant to the Papacy from 1105 to 1111 in opposition to Paschal II. A priest before his election, he was probably a native of Rome. He had the backing of the Roman militia and initially of the Holy Roman Emperor, Henry IV, who later forced him to abdicate. Today he is regarded as an antipope.

== Election ==
Before his election as pope, Maginulf (Note: Also spelled Maginulfo, Maginolfo in Italian.) was the archpriest of Sant'Angelo in Pescheria, which suggests that he was a native of Rome. He cannot be linked to the line of antipopes—Clement III, Theodoric and Adalbert—who opposed the Reformist papacy from 1080 to 1101. While the elections of Theodoric and Adalbert were relatively minor affairs, the election of Maginulf signalled a crisis in the pontificate of Pope Paschal II and was widely noted in contemporary chronicles: Annales Ceccanenses, Annales Leodienses, the Annalista Saxo, Ekkehard of Aura, Sigebert of Gembloux.

Members of the Roman aristocracy gathered in the Pantheon, then the church of Santa Maria Rotonda, and elected Maginulf in opposition to Paschal II in November 1105. The Annales Romani records the noblemen who supported his election: Stefano Oddone and his brothers, Nicola Cencio Baroncio and his son Pietro, Romano di Romano Baroncio and his brothers and nephews, and Enrico di Sant'Eustachio and his sons. This is the earliest record of Stefano Oddone, called the Norman, in the sources.

Margrave Werner of Ancona, in a letter to the Emperor Henry IV, describes his election as beginning with some clergy who were dissatisfied with Paschal's simoniacal favoritism of the Colonna and Pierleoni families. This, coupled with the involvement of the Roman aristocracy in his election, suggests that the motivations were less ideological than rooted in local politics. According to Werner, there were meetings in Rome attended by bishops and cardinals, after which Maginulf, a man of learning and upright character, was elected pope. The head of the Roman militia, Berto, was required to force Maginulf to accept the honour. According to Paschal's biography in the Liber pontificalis, Maginulf's election was the work of the Devil. In a letter, Paschal cites his failure to give sufficient "gifts" to the Romans for the election of Maginulf.

== Pontificate ==
After his election Maginulf took the papal name of Sylvester IV. (Note: Also spelled Silvester.) This was a deliberate ploy to garner imperial sympathy, since it hearkened back to Pope Sylvester II, the great ally of the Emperor Otto III a hundred years earlier. The conspirators who had elevated the new pope sent word to Margrave Werner, requesting imperial support. Werner marched on Rome with imperial (German) troops and took possession of the Lateran, forcing Paschal II to flee to Tiber Island according to the Annales Romani, although Paschal addressed a letter from Saint Peter's Basilica. Sylvester IV was consecrated in the Lateran Basilica on 18 November 1105. The following day a battle broke out in the streets of Rome. There were two pitched battles: one near the Lateran Basilica and another in the Circus Maximus. Both equites (cavalry) and pedites (infantrymen) were involved in the fighting. Sylvester's infantry are said to have chased Paschal's cavalry throughout Santa Maria Nova, leaving over sixty horses dead.

Sylvester IV soon ran short on funds to pay his soldiers and left Rome for Tivoli with a bodyguard before finally settling in Osimo under the protection of Margrave Werner. The next five years are completely unknown. Sylvester only comes again into view in the spring of 1111, when the German king Henry V used him as a pawn in his negotiations with Paschal. Henry, who wanted Paschal to crown him emperor, forced Sylvester to renounce the Papacy on 12 or 13 April 1111.

Sylvester was allowed to live out the rest of his life in Osimo under the protection of Werner. According to the Annales Romani, Werner acted out of pity, but there was probably some political calculation involved in willingness to control an ex-pope.
