= Minetree =

Minetree is a given name and surname. Notable people with the name include:

- Minetree Folkes (died 1959), American politician from Virginia
- Thomas A. Minetree (1931–2020), American physician
