= Antipope Adalbert =

Catholic cardinal and antipope in 1101

Adalbert
- Papacy began: February 1101
- Papacy ended: c. May 1101
- Predecessor: Roman claimant: Paschal II; Antipapal claimant: Theodoric
- Successor: Roman claimant: Paschal II; Antipapal claimant: Sylvester IV
- Opposed to: Paschal II
- Other posts: Cardinal of the Roman Catholic Church; Bishop of Silva Candida

Personal details
- Born: Albert Atella

Adalbert (or Albert) was elected pope of the Catholic Church in February 1101 and served for 105 days. He was a candidate of the Roman party opposed to Pope Paschal II and is regarded today as an antipope. Prior to his election he was created a cardinal by the antipope Clement III. He was captured by partisans of Paschal II and forced to live out his days as a monk.

== Cardinal ==
The date of Adalbert's birth is unknown, but he was from the town of Atella in southern Italy. He was an early supporter of Clement III, who rewarded him with the suburbicarian diocese of Silva Candida. He was among the twelve cardinals of Clement III who gathered in the Lateran Palace to underwrite a papal letter on 4 November 1084.

Adalbert can be traced at Rome throughout Clement's pontificate. He was by the antipope's side when Clement issued a privilege on 8 January 1089. On 7 August 1098, he was one of a group of prelates who presided over a conciliabulum convoked by Clement. The assembly condemned all the "old and new" heresies of the monk Hildebrand, that is, Pope Gregory VII. It also issued a summons to the "schismatics", the followers of Gregory's successor, Urban II, enjoining them to be present in Rome on 1 November. Adalbert's name is atop the list of signatories of this letter, an indication of his importance in the curia of Clement III.

When Clement's successor, Theodoric, was captured by his opponents in February 1101, Adalbert was elected to succeed him.

== Antipope ==
The circumstances of Adalbert's election are difficult to ascertain. It took place in the basilica of Santi Apostoli. According to the German chroniclers Frutolf of Michelsberg and Ekkehard of Aura, the Emperor Henry IV intervened to secure Adalbert's nomination, although sources nearer in space and time to events do not mention the emperor. Although the papal electors believed they were acting in the interests of the empire, Henry IV is not known to have had any contact with Adalbert. The Annales Romani, the richest source of information on Adalbert's pontificate, states simply that he was elected by that part of the clergy and people of Rome who had sided with Clement III.

It is clear that Adalbert was elected, consecrated and enthroned within days of Theodoric's capture in February 1101. Modern historians have often erroneously dated his election to 1102. The speed with which he was elected indicates that the pro-Imperial Clementine party in Rome was still well organized at the time. Among his known supporters were Romano, a cardinal who had taken part in the conciliabulum of 1098, and Romano's nephew, Giovanni Oddoline. Adalbert retained his baptismal name as pope. A pallium was made for Adalbert, although it could not be laid on Saint Peter's tomb, because the Clementine faction did not control it.

Adalbert's first public appearance drew a large crowd and rapidly degenerated into unrest. The situation eventually got so bad that he was forced to take refuge in the basilica of San Marcello al Corso under the protection of Romano and Giovanni Oddoline. Many clergy who tried to reach the church were beaten and stripped naked by the mob. Paschal II then bribed Giovanni to hand the antipope over. Adalbert was stripped of his pallium and handed over to Paschal's forces. His pontificate had lasted 105 days. He was led behind a horse (as a sign of contempt) to the Lateran Palace, where Paschal was residing. He was then imprisoned in a tower. The Annales Romani and the biography of Paschal in the Liber pontificalis agree that the acceptance of the bribe and the antipope's imprisonment took place in the space of one day.

Adalbert was eventually sent to the Benedictine monastery of San Lorenzo in Aversa, where he spent the rest of his life. The date of his death and the place of burial are not known. In 1105, the pro-Imperial party elected Maginulf as Sylvester IV in opposition to Paschal, but he was no more successful than his predecessors for he too lacked imperial support.
