= Francis Farmer =

Francis Farmer may refer to:

- Frances Farmer (1913–1970), American actress and television host
- Frances Farmer (librarian) (1909–1993), American jurist
- Francis Mark Farmer (1866–1922), dental surgeon and lecturer
