= John Marshall High School (Richmond, Virginia) =

Public high school in Virginia, US

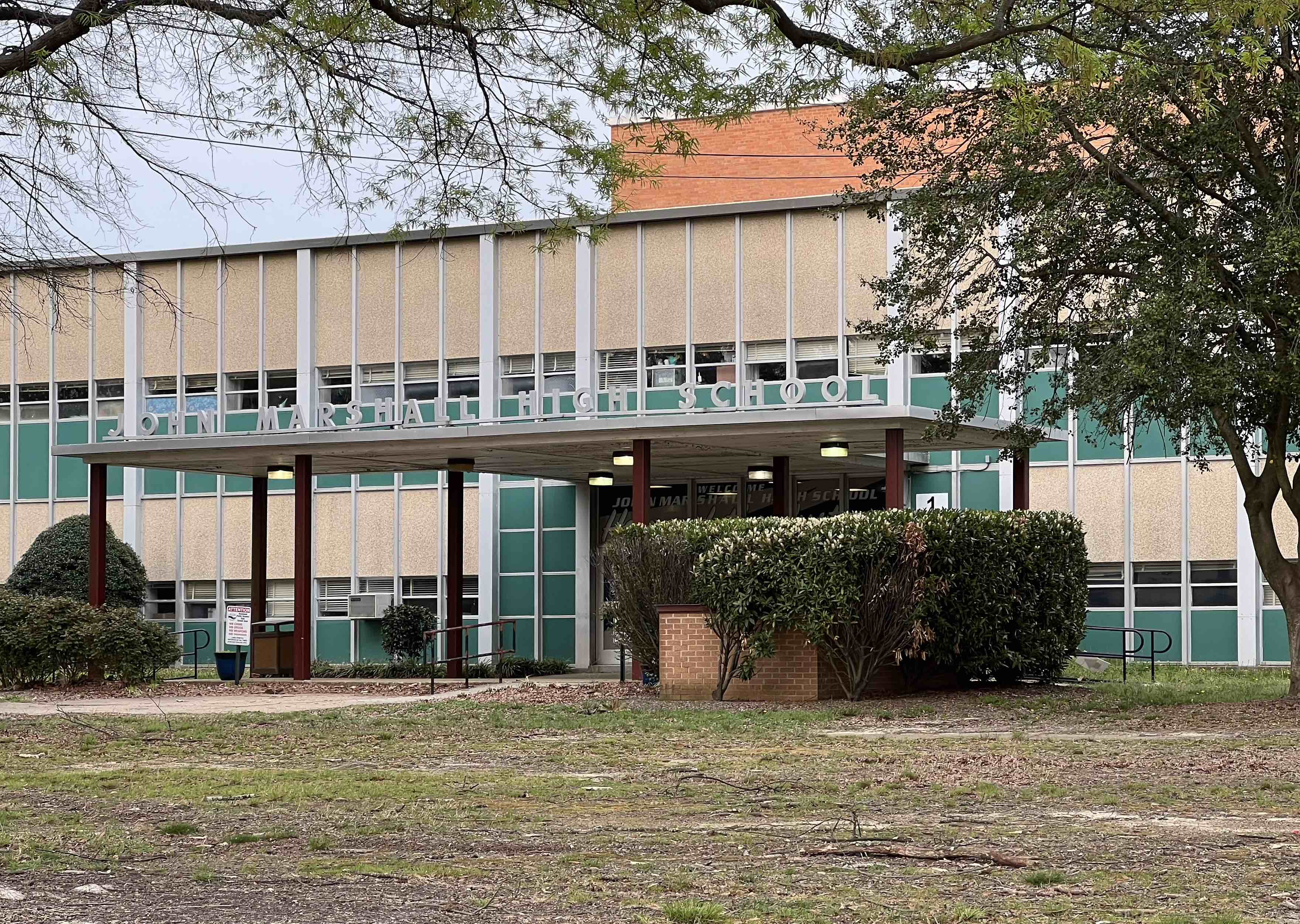

Location
- 4225 Old Brook Road; Richmond, Virginia 23227; United States
- 37°35′39.16″N 77°26′47.04″W

Information
- School type: Public high school
- Founded: 1909
- Locale: City, Midsize
- School district: Richmond City Public Schools
- NCES District ID: 5103240
- Superintendent: Jason Kamras
- NCES School ID: 510324002080
- Principal: Monica Murray
- Teaching staff: 63.00 (on an FTE basis)
- Grades: 9–12
- Enrollment: 645 (2024–25)
- Student to teacher ratio: 10.24
- Language: English
- Colors: Blue and white
- Mascot: Justices
- Website: https://jmhs.rvaschools.net

John Marshall High School, known colloquially as Jayem, is a secondary public school located in Richmond, Virginia, part of the Richmond Public Schools, serving grades 9–12.

== History ==
Named after Founding Father John Marshall, who also served as the fourth chief justice of the United States, the school originally opened in 1909, serving an all-white student body. The original school sat at the intersection of Eighth Street and Marshall Street, and was Richmond's first public high school when it opened. It was located behind the historic John Marshall House.

In late 1959, ground was broken for a replacement high school on the grounds of the old Pine Camp Tuberculosis Hospital. Several names were considered by the school board, which chose to re-use the John Marshall name. Following the 1959–60 school year, the original building was closed, with the new facility welcoming students in the fall of 1960. The original building was demolished in 1961, in spite of protests by students. Today, the John Marshall Courthouse complex is located at the site of the old school.

Desegregation arrived at John Marshall in 1961 when three Black students were admitted. Integration quickly followed, to the point where by 1968 the Black student population exceeded that of white students.

== Demographics ==
As of the 2025–26 school year, John Marshall's student body is 76.2% Black, with 88.7% minority enrollment. 116% of students were economically disadvantaged and on the free-lunch program.

== Student performance ==
As of the 2025–26 school year, 33% of John Marshall students had taken at least one AP test, 1% of students had passed at least one AP exam, and the graduation rate was 86%. Proficiency in mathematics was at 77%, while reading and science were at 63% and 72%, respectively.

== Notable alumni ==
- Carroll Alley – physicist
- T. Coleman Andrews – candidate for President of the United States in 1956
- Milton Bell – former professional basketball player
- June Carter Cash – Grammy award-winning country singer and songwriter; second wife of Johnny Cash
- Clifford Dowdey – writer
- Frances Farmer – law librarian and professor
- Minetree Folkes – member of the Virginia House of Delegates
- Fred Gantt – former professional basketball player
- Evelyn Byrd Harrison – classical scholar and archaeologist
- Frances Helm – stage, film, and television actress
- Kay Coles James – public official
- Arrington Jones – former NFL running back, San Francisco 49ers
- Charlotte Kohler – literary magazine editor and university professor
- John La Touche – lyricist
- Frank McCarthy – distinguished film producer, whose production Patton won the 1970 Academy Award for Best Picture
- T. Nelson Parker – mayor of Richmond, Virginia, commissioner of insurance
- Robert H. Patterson Jr. – lawyer
- Theresa Pollak – artist and art educator
- Bobby Phillips – former NFL running back, Minnesota Vikings
- Mel Roach – former Major League Baseball player
- Hansford Rowe – film, stage and television actor
- Ed Sherod – former professional basketball player
- Corey Smith – former NFL defensive end
- Charles L. Southward – United States Army major general
- Lewis Strauss – government official, businessman, philanthropist and naval officer; nemesis of J. Robert Oppenheimer
- Isaiah Todd – professional basketball player, NBA G League
- Emmett Watson – illustrator whose works appeared in popular magazines such as The Saturday Evening Post
