= Popess =

Popess or papess (a female pope) may refer to:

- Pope Joan, mythical female pope
- The High Priestess, tarot card
- Stephania (wife of Adrian II)
- A fairy chess piece, see list of fairy chess pieces
