= Robert H. Patterson Jr. =

American lawyer (1927–2012)

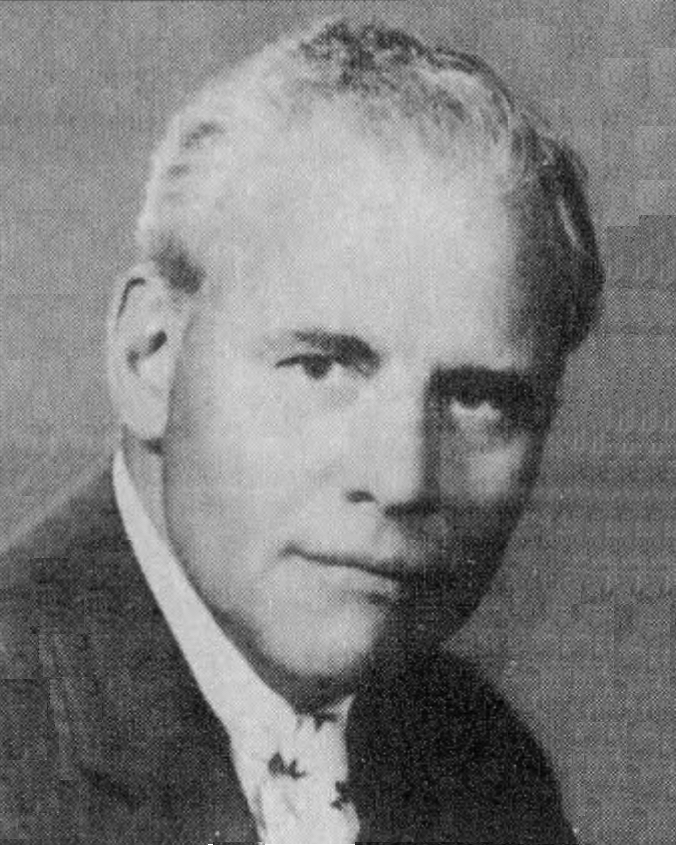
- Portrait of Patterson, c. 1980s
- Born: Robert Hobson Patterson Jr. January 30, 1927; Richmond, Virginia, U.S.
- Died: July 12, 2012 (aged 85); Richmond, Virginia, U.S.
- Education: Virginia Military Institute (BA); University of Virginia (LLB)
- Occupation: Lawyer
- Political party: Republican
- Spouses: Luise Franklin Wyatt (m. 1952; died 2001); Anne Marie Whittemore (m. 2003)
- Children: 3

Robert Hobson Patterson Jr. (January 30, 1927 – July 12, 2012) was an American lawyer. He served as managing partner and chair of the executive committee of McGuireWoods, was president of the Virginia State Bar, and was a member – later president – of the board of visitors of his undergraduate alma mater, the Virginia Military Institute. He was the lead attorney for VMI in United States v. Virginia, though Theodore Olson argued the case before the Supreme Court of the United States.

Politically a conservative, he was an assistant to Governor Thomas B. Stanley in 1956. He was later the Henrico County chair of Richard Nixon's presidential campaign in 1968 and was the state chair of Harry F. Byrd Jr.'s U.S. Senate campaign in 1970. In 1988, he was floated as a Republican candidate for U.S. Senate against Democratic former governor Chuck Robb.

== Early life and family ==
=== Childhood, military service, and education ===
Patterson was born on January 30, 1927, in Richmond, Virginia, the only son of Margaret Snoddy (née Sargent; 1902–1987), a nurse, and Robert Hobson Patterson (1892–1985), a railroad engineer and United States Navy veteran of World War I. His paternal grandfather, George W. Patterson of Buckingham County, Virginia was a second lieutenant in the Confederate States Army during the American Civil War. He grew up in Richmond's working-class Church Hill neighborhood.

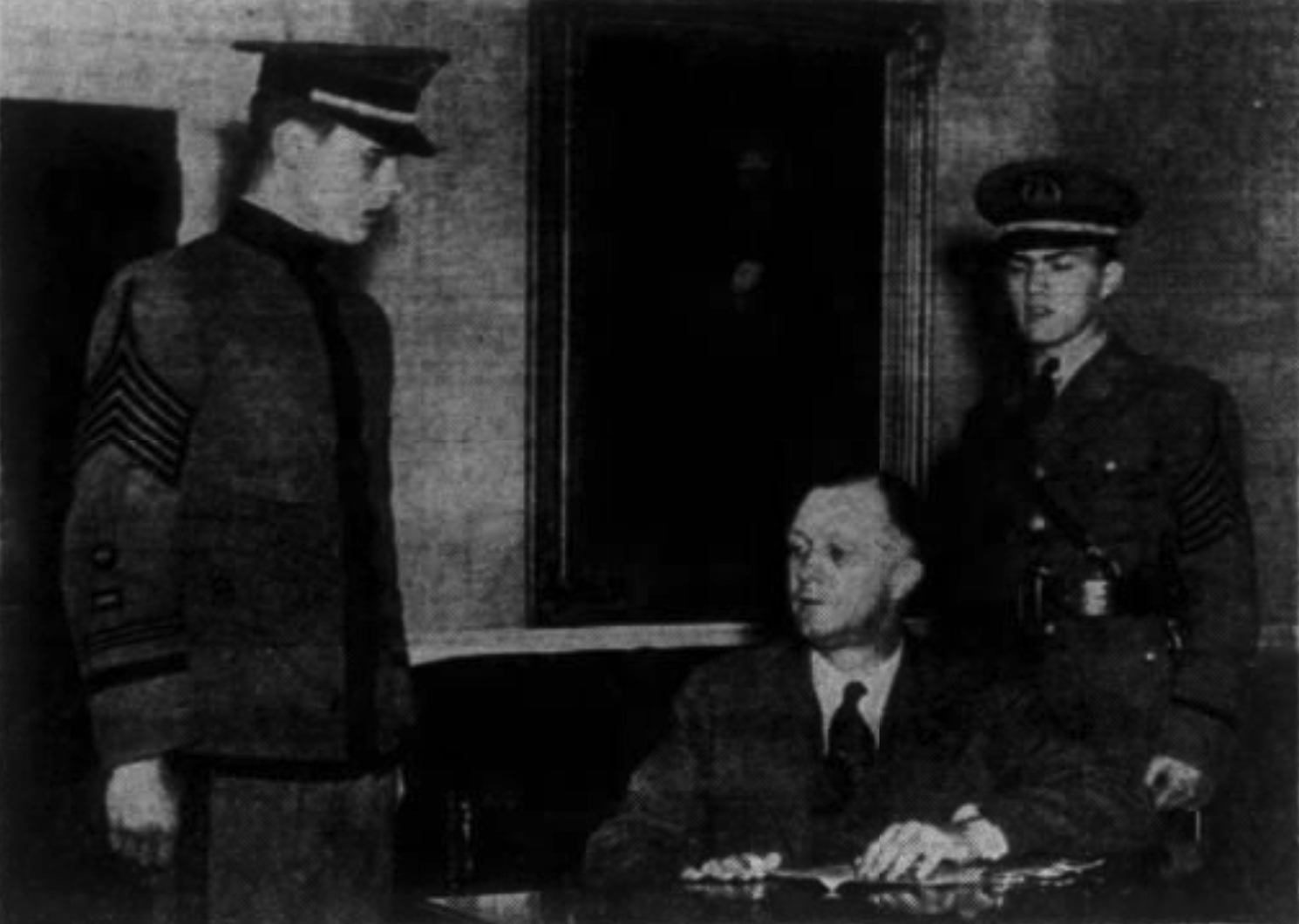
Patterson (left) as first captain of the corps of cadets at John Marshall High School, meeting Governor Colgate Darden in 1943

Patterson attended the public John Marshall High School in downtown Richmond, serving as first captain of its corps of cadets during his senior year. After graduating high school in 1944, he entered the Virginia Military Institute and was elected vice president of his class but was expelled the following year for being a troublemaker. He chose to enlist in the Navy and served during the closing months of World War II. In 1946, despite being offered an appointment to the United States Naval Academy, he returned to VMI, where he studied history. The newly-formed Class of 1949-C, composed mostly of returning war veterans, elected him as class historian. He was a member of the school's football, polo, and track teams as well as its honor court and an assistant editor of the student newspaper, The VMI Cadet. The 1949 Bomb yearbook highlights his work on behalf of the school's "States' Rights Club," an organization that was formed to support Strom Thurmond's segregationist 1948 presidential campaign. He later attended the University of Virginia School of Law, where he was selected to be on the staff of the Virginia Law Review. He graduated with a Bachelor of Laws degree in 1952.

=== Marriages ===
Patterson married the former Luise Franklin Wyatt at Richmond's First Baptist Church on June 14, 1952, in a ceremony officiated by the church's lead pastor, Theodore F. Adams. His father served as his best man. The couple later traveled north for their honeymoon. They went on to have three children: India, Robert III, and Margaret. Luise died in on January 17, 2001.

Patterson later married Anne Marie Whittemore, a partner at McGuireWoods who served as his co-counsel in the VMI case, on November 15, 2003. In 1971, he was the only partner to oppose hiring Whittemore as an associate, voting on the basis of her sex, though he later admitted to having changed his mind about her.

== Later life and death ==
On December 31, 1999, Patterson retired from the practice of law, devoting himself to volunteer work.

Patterson's health began to decline after he suffered a stroke on February 18, 2011. He died on July 12, 2012, at VCU Medical Center in Richmond. Following services at St. Mary's Episcopal Church in Goochland County, he was buried in the church cemetery alongside his first wife.

Academic offices
Preceded by Sol W. Rawls Jr.	President of the Board of Visitors of the Virginia Military Institute; 1976–1977	Succeeded by Frank G. Louthan Jr.
Business positions
Preceded by Thomas C. Gordon	Chair of the Executive Committee of McGuire, Woods & Battle; 1979–1989	Succeeded by Robert L. Burrus Jr.
