= Fred Gantt =

American basketball player

Personal information
- Born: November 27, 1922 Richmond, Virginia
- Died: January 11, 2002 (aged 79) Sandston, Virginia
- Listed height: 6 ft 3 in (1.91 m)
- Listed weight: 170 lb (77 kg)

Career information
- High school: John Marshall (Richmond, Virginia)
- College: Richmond (1942–1946)
- Position: Guard / forward

Career history
- 1947–1948: Sheboygan Red Skins

Career highlights
- 3× First-team all-Virginia (1944–1946)

Frederick William Gantt (November 27, 1922 – January 11, 2002) was an American professional basketball player. He played for the Sheboygan Red Skins in the National Basketball League during the 1947–48 season and averaged 1.8 points per game.
