= Anastasius Bibliothecarius =

Antipope and chief archivist of the Catholic church

Antipope Anastasius III
- Papacy began: c. 17 July 855
- Papacy ended: c. 29 September 855
- Predecessor: Roman claimant: Leo IV; Antipapal claimant: John VIII
- Successor: Roman claimant: Benedict III; Antipapal claimant: Christopher
- Other posts: Abbot of Santa Maria in Trastevere; Bibliothecarius of the Roman Catholic Church

Personal details
- Born: c. 810
- Died: c. 878

Anastasius Bibliothecarius (c. 810 – c. 878) was the chief archivist and librarian (bibliothecarius) of the Holy See and also briefly a claimant to the papacy.

== Early life ==
He was a nephew of Bishop Arsenius of Orte, who executed important commissions as Papal legate. Anastasius learned the Greek language from Eastern Roman monks and obtained an unusual education for his era, such that he appears to be the most learned ecclesiastic of Rome in the 9th century.

== Abbot of Santa Maria and secretary of Nicholas I ==
During the pontificate of Pope Nicholas I (858–867) Anastasius was abbot of Santa Maria in Trastevere on the farther side of the Tiber. He was employed by the pope in various matters. He was also active as an author, and translated Greek language works into Latin. Among them was the biography of St. John the Merciful, which he dedicated to Nicholas I. He has been shown by Ernst Perels to be the 'ghost-writer' behind much papal official correspondence of these years.

The successor of Nicholas, Pope Adrian II (867–872), appointed Anastasius bibliothecarius (Head of archives) of the Roman Church, an important office at the Lateran Palace that gave him further influence at the papal court.

== Envoy to Constantinople ==
In 869 he was sent by Louis II, Holy Roman Emperor as envoy to Constantinople, with two men of high rank in the Frankish Empire, to negotiate a marriage between Leo VI the Wise, oldest son of the Eastern Roman emperor Basil I, and Louis's only child, Ermengard.

When the envoys arrived at Constantinople, the Fourth Council of Constantinople was still in session, and Anastasius, who attended the last session (February, 870), zealously defended the papal cause and was of much service to the papal legates.

On their way home the papal legates were robbed, and the "Acts" of the council were carried off. However, they had given most of the declarations of obedience of the Greek bishops to Anastasius, who also had a copy of the "Acts", and was thus able to bring these documents to the pope. At the pope's order, he translated the "Acts" into Latin. The Greek originals are lost.

== Continued influence ==
The successor of Adrian II, Pope John VIII (872–882), also esteemed Anastasius, confirmed him in the office of librarian, entrusted important affairs to him, and encouraged him to further literary work.

Anastasius was in correspondence with the deposed Byzantine patriarch, Photius, and sought to mediate between the patriarch and the pope and also to assuage the controversy over the Holy Ghost by assuming that the Latins understood the processio (procession) of the Holy Ghost from the Son in the sense of missio (transmission).

Recent scholarship has surmised that Anastasius' role in disseminating the claims of the Pseudo-Isidorian Decretals and through muscular correspondence East and West that he was "the architect and promoter of the papal claims."

== Presumed identification with antipope Anastasius ==
If a passage in the annals of Hincmar of Reims is genuine and Hincmar has not confused two men, then the bibliothecarius Anastasius is identical with the Roman presbyter Anastasius who in 874 became titular priest of St. Marcellus. This Anastasius had fled from Rome in 848, to reside in various cities. As a result of his flight he was excommunicated by a Roman synod in 850, and, as he did not return, was anathematized and deposed by another synod in 853.

After the death of Pope Leo IV in 855 this Anastasius was elected as Antipope by the imperial party, but the rightfully elected Pope Benedict III gained the supremacy, and acted kindly towards the usurper.

During the pontificate of Pope Adrian II, Anastasius became involved in serious difficulties when, in 868, his brother Eleutherius forcibly carried off the daughter of the Pope and soon afterwards killed her and her mother Stephania. Eleutherius was executed and Anastasius, who was regarded as the instigator of the murder, was punished by excommunication and deposition. He lived at the Imperial court and sought by the intervention of the Emperor to exculpate himself before the Pope. Joseph Hergenröther maintains that the bibliothecarius and the presbyter Anastasius (the antipope) were one and the same person, and weaves all the statements concerning the latter into the biography of Anastasius, while Joseph Langen considers them different persons. In August, 879, Zacharias of Anagni appears as Head of archives of the Roman Church, so Anastasius must have died shortly before this date.

== Translator and author ==
Anastasius translated from Greek into Latin the "Acts" of both the Second Council of Nicaea and the Fourth Council of Constantinople, as well as several hagiographies of saints, along with other writings. Knowledge of Greek was so unusual that only he could revise his translations. The attribution to Anastasius of the ancient Latin translation of the Acts of the Third Council of Constantinople has been proved to be wrong on manuscript evidence by Rudolph Riedinger.

He also compiled a historical work, "Chronographia tripartita", from the Greek writings of Theophanes, Nicephorus, and George Syncellus, and made a collection of documents concerning the affairs of Pope Honorius I. Several important letters written by him have been preserved. The Liber Pontificalis, which was formerly ascribed to him, was not written by him; he seems to have shared in the revision of the Life of Nicholas I.

== See also ==
- Papal selection before 1059
