= Bobby Phillips (American football) =

American football player (born 1969)

No. 30
- Position: Running back

Personal information
- Born: December 8, 1969 (age 56); Richmond, Virginia, U.S.
- Listed height: 5 ft 9 in (1.75 m)
- Listed weight: 187 lb (85 kg)

Career information
- High school: Richmond (VA) John Marshall
- College: Virginia Union
- NFL draft: 1995: undrafted

Career history
- Minnesota Vikings (1995); Frankfurt Galaxy (1996); Pittsburgh Steelers (1997)*; Frankfurt Galaxy (1997); England Monarchs (1998); Edmonton Eskimos (1999)
- * Offseason or practice squad member only
- Stats at Pro Football Reference

Bobby Eugene Phillips II (born December 8, 1969) is an American former professional football running back who played in the National Football League (NFL).

Phillips was born in Richmond, Virginia and attended John Marshall High School. He played collegiately at Virginia Union and was signed by the Minnesota Vikings as an undrafted free agent.
