= Antipope Theodoric =

Catholic antipope from 1100 to 1101

- Papacy began: 8 September 1100
- Papacy ended: 1101
- Predecessor: Roman claimant : Paschal II; Antipapal claimant : Clement III
- Successor: Roman claimant : Paschal II; Antipapal claimant : Adalbert
- Opposed to: Paschal II
- Other posts: Papal legate of Clement III to Germany; Cardinal Deacon of Santa Maria in Via Lata; Bishop of Albano

Personal details
- Born: Teodoric
- Died: 1102 Monastery of Santissima Trinità di Cava

Theodoric was an antipope in 1100 and 1101, in the schism that began with Wibert of Ravenna in 1080, in opposition to the excesses of Pope Gregory VII and in support of the Emperor Henry IV.

== Biography ==
The earliest record of Theodoric is his signature on a document of the antipope Clement III (Wibert) dated 4 November 1084, where he signs as cardinal deacon of S. Maria in Via Lata. In a letter of 29 July 1099, Clement III refers to Theoderic as one of those cardinals who anathematized Gregory VII (who died on 25 May 1085) as a heretic and simoniac.

In 1098, Cardinal Theodoric became involved in German affairs, as papal legate of Clement III. Archbishop Rothardus of Mainz had not only refused to accept the legitimacy of antipope Clement III, but was working against the Emperor Henry and his antipope by rallying the bishops of Germany to meet in a synod in Mainz on 1 December 1097. Clement had tried several times to bring the archbishop under control. First, he had Rothardus summoned to the papal court to answer charges of simony; when he refused to appear, Theodoric and another bishop summoned him; finally the Deacon Hugo also summoned him. Having failed to appear, on 29 July 1099 the people of Mainz were released from their obedience to Rothardus and warned of the interdict that would be inflicted on any who associated with him. Theodoric wrote and witnessed the papal letter. On 18 October 1099, he was in Tivoli, where he witnessed a document of antipope Clement III in favor of Cardinal Romanus of S. Ciriaco.

The legitimate pope, Urban II, died on 29 July 1099, and his successor Paschal II was elected at the church of San Clemente on 13 August 1099, and consecrated on 14 August 1099 in St. Peter's Basilica. The Antipope Clement III was expelled from Rome at the same time, and died on 8 September 1100, at Civita Castellana, some 60km (37 mi) north of Rome.

According to the "Annales Romani", the followers of Clement met secretly in Rome, at night, in St. Peter's Basilica, where they elected and enthroned Cardinal Theodoric, the Bishop of Albano, who may have assumed the name Sylvester III. But he did not dare to remain in the city. Forced to abandon Rome to seek protection of the emperor, Theodoric was seized by partisans of Pope Paschal II, and sent to Rome. He was convicted by judgment of the fathers, and immediately sent to the monastery of Santissima Trinità di Cava, near Salerno, where he was compelled to become a monk, or, according to the "Life of Pope Paschal II," a hermit.

He died at Cava in 1102, according to the epitaph in the crypt of the monastery. A later memorial plaque in La Cava commemorates him under the pontifical name of "Sylvester III", because the earlier Pope Sylvester III (Giovanni dei Crescenzi), at that time was considered an antipope. Theodoric's successor was Antipope Albert, elected in 1101, or in February or March 1102.

== See also ==
- Papal selection before 1059

== Sources ==
- "Annales Romani," in: Georg Heinrich Pertz (1844). Monumenta Germaniae Historica: Scriptorum (in Latin). Vol. Tomus V. Hannover: Hahn. pp. 468–480.
- Hüls, Rudolf. Kardinäle, Klerus und Kirchen Roms: 1049–1130 (Tübingen 1977) [Bibliothek des Deutschen Historischen Instituts in Rom, Band 48].
- Philipp Jaffé (1885). G. Wattenbach (ed.). Regesta pontificum romanorum: ab condita ecclesia ad annum post Christum natum MCXCVIII (in Latin). Vol. Tomus I (2nd ed.). Leipzig: Veit. p. 772.
- Kehr, Paul Fridolin (1900). "Due documenti pontifici illustranti la storia di Roma negli ultimi anni del secolo IX," in: Archivio della reale Società romana di storia patria XXIII (1900), pp. 277–283, at pp. 280–283. (in Italian)
- Piazza, Andrea; Anzoise, Stefania (2019). "Teodorico, antipapa", Dizionario Biografico degli Italiani Volume 95 (Treccani: 2019) (in Italian)
- Watterich, J. B. M. (1862). Pontificum Romanorum qui fuerunt inde ab exeunte saeculo IX usque ad finem saeculi XIII vitae: ab aequalibus conscriptae (in Latin). Vol. Tom. II. Leipzig: G. Engelmann.
