= Frances Farmer (librarian) =

American law librarian and professor

- Born: December 5, 1909; Keysville
- Died: September 13, 1993; Charlottesville
- Occupations: Bibliothecarius, professor
- Employers: University of Richmond School of Law (1938–); University of Virginia School of Law (1942–); University of Virginia School of Law (1963–1969); University of Virginia School of Law (1969–1976)

Frances Farmer (December 5, 1909 – September 13, 1993) was an American law librarian and professor. From 1944 to 1976, she headed the library at the University of Virginia School of Law, responsible for its growth, modernization, and prestige. She was also the first female full professor at the University of Virginia School of Law.

== Early life, education, and career ==
Frances Farmer was born on December 5, 1909, in Keysville, Virginia, the daughter of Florence Womack Farmer and Horatio Weldon Farmer, a wheelwright, auto mechanic, and insurance agent. She graduated from John Marshall High School in Richmond, Virginia, in 1927 and earned a B.A. in history from Westhampton College at the University of Richmond in 1931. She went on to the University of Richmond School of Law, the only woman in her law class. She graduated in 1933 and was awarded the O.H. Berry Medal for "best all-around graduate in law." She passed the bar in December 1933.

Farmer began working as a part-time secretary to Ray Doubles, Dean of the University of Richmond Law School, while still in school. Unable to find employment as a lawyer during a time when it was difficult for women to do so, she continued working for Doubles after graduation. She began working as assistant law librarian with responsibility for much of the work of the library, including collection development and bookkeeping. In 1934, she took a course Law Library Administration at the School of Library Service at Columbia University. In 1938, she became the law librarian.

She was also very active in civic affairs in Richmond and was an officer or board member of numerous organizations: the Richmond Branch of University Women (AAUW) (1934-36), the Virginia Consumers' League (1935), the Virginia Social Science Association (1935), the Virginia Women's Council of Legislative Chairmen of States Organizations (1936), the Richmond League of Women Voters and the local Y.M.C.A. Her work with these organizations included public speaking, radio interviews, and legislative testimony.

== University of Virginia School of Law ==
In July 1942, Farmer was hired by the University of Virginia School of Law as senior cataloger at its law library and as executive secretary of the law library committee. She spent the rest of her career at the school, becoming law librarian in 1944, associate professor in 1963, full professor in 1969, and professor emeritus upon her retirement in 1976. At her start, the library had no library catalog and only 40,000 uncatalogued books, and she grew it to over 300,000 volumes at her retirement. She became active in the alumni association to promote fundraising to supplement state appropriations inadequate for collection development. She also promoted technological development, including microforms and databases. The Attorney General of Virginia appointed her in 1976 to study the use of computers in legal research for state lawyers and officials. She had a reputation as a tenacious and formidable administrator. When University of Virginia President Colgate Darden asked a dean why a particular decision was made, he was told that "Miss Farmer had concluded that that is what should be done."

During her career she was internationally recognized for her expertise. She served as president of the American Association of Law Libraries in 1959-1960. She was a consultant to Nigeria's law library and was invited to the First Conference of Law Librarians in Nigeria, at the Nigerian Law School on Victoria Island, Lagos in 1975.

== Death and legacy ==
Frances Farmer died on September 13, 1993, in Charlottesville.

== Bibliography ==
- with Ray Doubles, Manual of Legal Bibliography (1947)
- editor, The Woodrow Wilson Reader (1956)
