= Thomas A. Minetree =

American oncologist (1931–2020)

- Born: Thomas Andrew Minetree; July 7, 1931; Poplar Bluff, Missouri
- Died: January 8, 2020 (aged 88); Muscle Shoals, Alabama, U.S.
- Education: University of Missouri at Columbia; University of Alabama School of Medicine (MD)
- Occupation: Oncologist
- Known for: operating free-standing cancer centers
- Spouse: Virginia Mae McClanahan (m. 1955)
- Children: 7

Thomas Andrew Minetree (July 7, 1931 – January 8, 2020) was an American physician and a pioneer of free-standing cancer centers. He was board-certified in radiation oncology, diagnostic radiology, and nuclear medicine.

== Early life ==
Thomas Andrew Minetree was born on July 7, 1931 in Poplar Bluff, Missouri to Ruth Vernon (née Ester) and Richard Herbert Minetree. He attended Poplar Bluff High School and played football, basketball, and track. He later attended the University of Missouri at Columbia, became a member of Sigma Chi, and played halfback for the Mizzou Tigers. In 1959, he graduated with a Doctor of Medicine from the University of Alabama School of Medicine and became board-certified in radiation oncology, diagnostic radiology, and nuclear medicine. He interned at the University of Arkansas at Little Rock.

== Career ==
In 1976, with the vision of bringing big-city cancer care to small communities, Minetree founded Bethesda Cancer Centers, becoming the first private individual in the United States to open a free-standing radiation therapy cancer center. According to his obituary, he was the first person in the United States to purchase a medical linear accelerator. Minetree opened 12 cancer centers under Bethesda Cancer Centers throughout the southern and midwestern United States, two in Illinois, three in Alabama, two in Tennessee, two in Mississippi, two in Missouri, and one in Arkansas. He retired in the 1990s. Bethesda Cancer Centers are now owned and operated by Sonix Medical Resources, Inc., a New York Corporation.

Minetree was a member of the Butler-Ripley-Wayne County Medical Society in Missouri.

== Personal life ==
Minetree married Virginia Mae McClanahan on May 22, 1955. They had seven children, Thomas Andrew II, Ruth Lea, Christian David, Andrew, Virginia Marie, Malisa, and Nicole. In the 1960s, he lived in Poplar Bluff and moved to a ranch near Aspen, Colorado after retiring. He was an avid pilot and skier in his free time.

Minetree died on January 8, 2020, in Muscle Shoals, Alabama.

== Awards ==
In 2008, Minetree was honored by the American Cancer Society for his contribution to oncology.

== See also ==
- Cancer Information Service (CIS)
- National Cancer Institute
