= Pope Adrian II =

Head of the Catholic Church from 867 to 872

- Bishop of Rome
- Church: Catholic Church
- Papacy began: 14 December 867
- Papacy ended: 14 December 872
- Predecessor: Nicholas I
- Successor: John VIII

Orders
- Consecration: 14 Dec 867 by Donatus of Ostia

Personal details
- Born: 792 Rome, Papal States
- Died: 14 December 872 (aged 79–80) Rome, Papal States
- Spouse: Stephania
- Children: 1

Pope Adrian II (Latin: Hadrianus II; also Hadrian II; 792 – 14 December 872) was the bishop of Rome and leader of the Papal States from 867 to his death on 14 December 872. He continued the policy of his predecessor, Nicholas I. Despite seeking good relations with Louis II of Italy, he was placed under surveillance, and his wife and daughters were killed by Louis' supporters.

== Family ==
Adrian was a member of a noble Roman family, related to Popes Stephen IV and Sergius II. In his youth, he married a woman named Stephania and had a daughter with her. Adrian later became a priest after having already been married.

Adrian was selected to become pope on 14 December 867. He was already at an advanced age (75), and objected to assuming the papacy. His wife, Stephania, and daughter moved with him to the Lateran Palace, but were soon kidnapped by Eleutherius, who had wed the latter, and murdered both upon being discovered.

== Pontificate ==
Adrian II maintained, but with less energy, the policies of his predecessor, Nicholas I. King Lothair II of Lotharingia, who died in 869, left Adrian to mediate between the Frankish kings with a view to secure the imperial inheritance to Lothair's brother, Louis II of Italy. Adrian sought to maintain good relations with Louis, since the latter's campaigns in southern Italy had the potential to free the papacy from the threat posed by the Muslims.

Patriarch Photius I of Constantinople, shortly after the council in which he had pronounced sentence of deposition against Pope Nicholas I, was driven from the patriarchate by a new Byzantine emperor, Basil the Macedonian, who favoured Photius' rival, Ignatius. The Fourth Council of Constantinople was convoked to decide this matter. At this council, Adrian was represented by legates who presided at the condemnation of Photius as a heretic, but did not succeed in coming to an understanding with Ignatius on the subject of jurisdiction over the Bulgarian Church.

Adrian supported the work of Cyril and Methodius in Moravia, and authorized the use of the new Slavic liturgy. He subsequently ordained Methodius a priest. In 869, he consecrated Methodius archbishop and Metropolitan of Sirmium.

Like Nicholas I, Adrian was forced to submit in temporal affairs to the interference of Emperor Louis II, who placed him under the surveillance of Bishop Arsenius of Orte, his confidential adviser, and Arsenius' nephew, Anastasius the Librarian. Arsenius' son Eleutherius married Adrian's daughter, having withheld the fact that he was already espoused to another. In 868, he abducted and murdered Adrian's wife and daughter. Eleutherius was condemned to death for his crimes.

Adrian died on 14 December 872, after exactly five years of pontificate.

Catholic Church titles
| Preceded by Nicholas I | Pope; 867–872 | Succeeded by John VIII |
