= Stephania (wife of Adrian II) =

Wife of Pope Adrian II

- Popess of Rome
- Born: unknown
- Died: 868
- Spouse: Pope Adrian II
- Issue: 1

Stephania (died 868) was a Roman noblewoman and the wife of Pope Adrian II. Upon her husband's election to the papacy in 867, she resided in the Lateran Palace. She and her daughter were abducted and later murdered by her son-in-law, Eleutherius, in 868. Her abduction and death was described in the chronicle Annales Bertiniani by Saint Hincmar.

== Biography ==
Stephania married the future Adrian II before he took his vows as a priest and had a daughter with him. Adrian was at the relatively advanced age of seventy-five when he became pope. Catholic priests had been required to abstain from all further sexual relations since the 4th century at the latest. However, in this time period, it was not yet forbidden for Catholic priests to marry, only an ideal: the formal celibacy for priests was not introduced until the Second Council of the Lateran in 1139.

Stephania was still alive when Adrian II was elected pope in 867. Her position was almost unique. While six popes in total had been married at some point, Adrian II was likely the only one married during his papacy, while the others appear to have been widowed by the time they became popes. The last married pope had been Hormisdas three centuries prior, and he was widowed when he became pope. The wives of Catholic priests were called by the female version of their husband's title, which would have made Stephania "popess". Stephania and her daughter lived with Adrian in the Lateran Palace.

The daughter of Adrian II and Stephania married Eleutherius, a relative of the Papal librarian Anastasius Bibliothecarius. However, Eleutherius withheld the fact that he was already espoused to another. In 868, Stephania and her daughter were abducted by Eleutherius and murdered by him. Eleutherius was condemned to death for the abduction and murder. His relative Anastasius Bibliothecarius was accused of having conspired to the abduction and excommunicated.

The abduction and murder of the pope's wife and daughter attracted a lot of attention and was described in the third part of the famous chronicle Annales Bertiniani by Bishop Hincmar in Pertz, Mon. Germanica vol. 1.

== Works cited ==
- William Cornwallis Cartwright On Papal Conclaves 123
- Alexander Penrose Forbes Articles XXII to end 637
- The Religion of Rome described by a Roman: Authorised translation by William Howitt 293
- Richard Wigginton Thompson The Papacy and the Civil Power
