= Bibliothecarius =

Bibliothecarius is a Latin term meaning librarian. As a nickname, it may refer to:

- Anastasius Bibliothecarius, archivist and librarian of the Holy See, elected anti-pope in 855
- Petrus Bibliothecarius, 9th-century compiler of the Historia Francorum abbreviata
