= Minetree Folkes =

American politician and lawyer (died 1959)

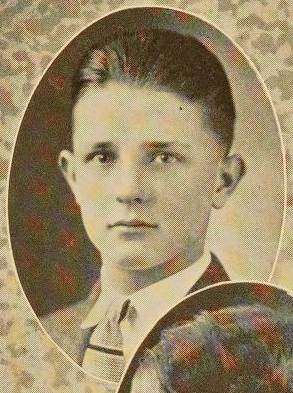
- Photo of Folkes, c. 1925

Member of the Virginia House of Delegates from the Henrico, Chesterfield and Colonial Heights district
- In office 1954 – December 22, 1959

Member of the U.S. House of Representatives from 's Richmond district
- In office 1938–1942

Personal details
- Born: Minetree Folkes Jr. Richmond, Virginia, U.S.
- Died: December 22, 1959 (aged 51) Richmond, Virginia, U.S.
- Resting place: Hollywood Cemetery
- Spouse: Frances Thornton
- Education: Virginia Military Institute (BS); University of Richmond School of Law (LLB)
- Occupation: Politician; lawyer

Minetree Folkes Jr. (died December 22, 1959) was an American politician and lawyer from Virginia. He served in the Virginia House of Delegates from 1938 to 1942 and from 1954 to his death in 1959.

== Early life ==
Minetree Folkes Jr. was born in Richmond, Virginia, to Mary (née Wily) and Minetree Folkes. His father served as commonwealth's attorney in Richmond. He attended public schools in Richmond and graduated from John Marshall High School. He graduated with a Bachelor of Science in civil engineering from the Virginia Military Institute and a Bachelor of Laws from the University of Richmond School of Law.

== Career ==
Folkes worked as a lawyer in Richmond. He served in the Virginia House of Delegates, representing Richmond, from 1938 to 1942. In 1942, he enlisted with the U.S. Marine Corps during World War II. He served with the 19th Marine Regiment and fought at the Bougainville, Guam and Iwo Jima. He was wounded at Iwo Jima and attained the rank of major during his service. He retired in 1946.

In 1946 and 1950, Folkes ran for the Virginia's 3rd congressional district seat, but lost to J. Vaughan Gary in both Democratic primary elections. In 1949, he was the 3rd district campaign manager for Francis Pickens Miller during his gubernatorial primary race. In the 1952 gubernatorial race, he supported Harry F. Byrd over Miller. From 1954 to his death, Folkes served in the Virginia House of Delegates, representing Henrico, Chesterfield and Colonial Heights. In 1958, he was a member of the currency and commerce, privileges and elections, roads and internal navigation and the Chesepeake and its tributaries committees. At the time of his death, he was chairman and public representative on the Richmond Milk Board.

Folkes was vice president of the board of visitors of the Virginia School for the Deaf and Blind starting in 1938.

== Personal life ==
Folkes married Frances Thornton. He had a stepdaughter, Elizabeth. He was a member of the Episcopal Church. He lived on College Road in Richmond.

Folkes died from heart disease on December 22, 1959, aged 51, at a hospital in Richmond. He was buried in Hollywood Cemetery.
