= Louis Duchesne =

French priest and Church historian (1843–1922)

The Reverend Louis Duchesne
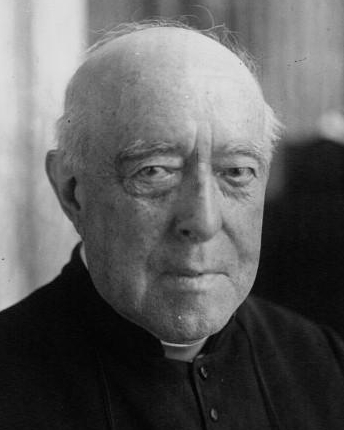
- Duchesne in 1920 (Agence Meurisse)
- Born: Louis Marie Olivier Duchesne; 13 September 1843; Saint-Servan, Ille-et-Vilaine
- Died: 21 April 1922 (aged 78); Rome
- Occupations: Priest and academic
- Notable work: Liber Pontificalis (translation into French)

Louis Marie Olivier Duchesne (French: [dyʃɛːn]; 13 September 1843 – 21 April 1922) was a French Catholic priest, philologist, teacher and a critical historian of Christianity and the Catholic Church.

== Biography ==
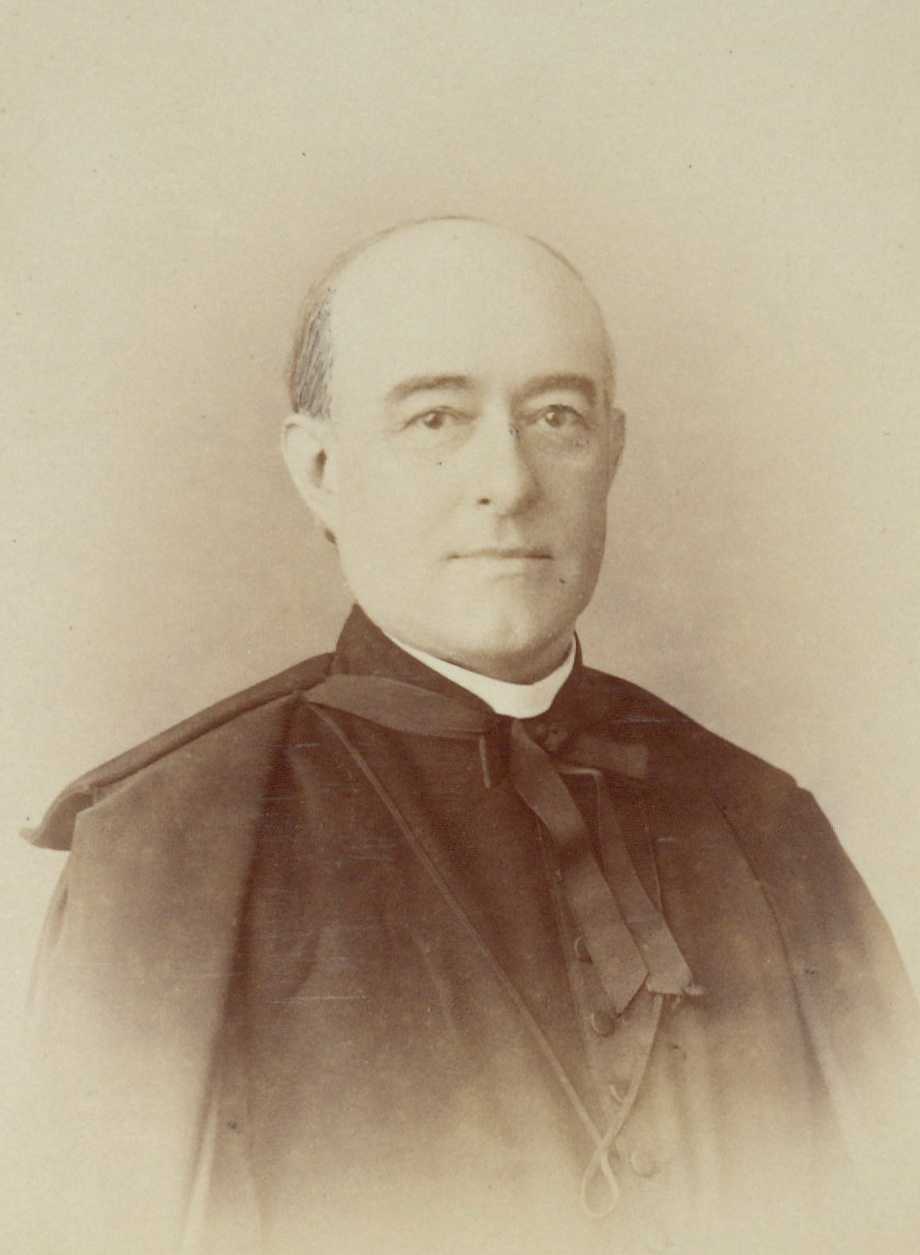
Duchesne in his presbyteral robe

Descended from a family of Breton sailors, he was born on 13 September 1843 in Saint-Servan, Ille-et-Vilaine, Place Roulais, now part of Saint-Malo on the Breton coast, and was orphaned in 1849, after the death of his father Jacques Duchesne. Louis' brother, Jean-Baptiste Duchesne, settled in Oregon City, Oregon, in 1849.

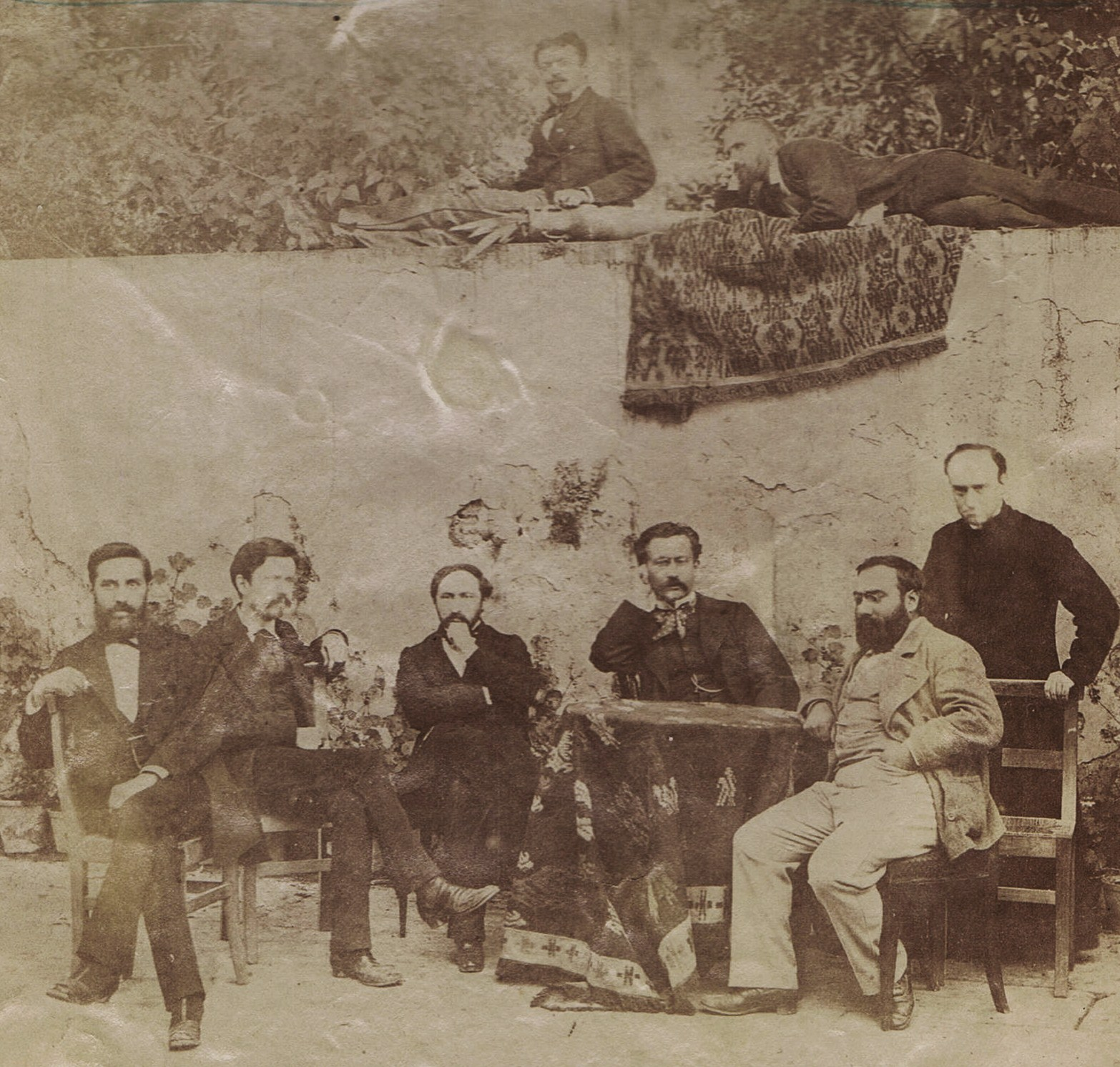
Duchesne, standing at right, École française de Rome, c.1873–1876

Louis Duchesne was ordained to the priesthood in 1867. He taught in Saint-Brieuc, then in 1868, went to study at the École pratique des Hautes Études in Paris. From 1873 to 1876, he was a student at the École française in Rome. He was an amateur archaeologist and organized expeditions from Rome to Mount Athos, to Syria, and Asia Minor, from which he gained an interest in the early history of the Catholic Church.

In 1877, Duchesne obtained the chair of ecclesiastical history of the Catholic Institute of Paris but left the theological faculty in 1883. He then taught at the École Pratique des Hautes Études, where he influenced Alfred Firmin Loisy, a founder of the movement of Modernism, which was formally condemned under Pope Pius X. In 1895, he was appointed director of the École française.

In 1887, Duchesne published the results of his thesis, followed by the first complete critical edition of the Liber Pontificalis. At a difficult time for critical historians applying modern methods to Church history, drawing together archaeology and topography to supplement literature and setting ecclesiastical events with contexts of social history, Duchesne was in constant correspondence with like-minded historians among the Bollandists, with their long history of critical editions of hagiographies. He gained fame as a demythologizing critical historian of the popular, pious lives of saints produced by Second Empire publishers.

In 1888, Duchesne became a member of the Académie des inscriptions et belles-lettres, and in 1910, he was elected to the Académie française. Duchesne was made an apostolic prothonotary in 1900. As editor of the Bulletin critique du littérature, d'histoire et de théologie, Duchesne kept up with current intellectual developments.

Duchesne also wrote Les Sources du martyrologe hyéronimien, Origines du culte chrétien (translated as Christian Worship: Its Origin and Evolution and often reprinted), Fastes épiscopaux de l'ancienne Gaule, and Les Premiers temps de l'État pontifical. These works were universally praised, and he was appointed a commander of the Legion of Honor. However, his Histoire ancienne de l'Église (Early History of the Christian Church) was considered too modernist by the Church during the "Modernist crisis" and was placed on the Index of Forbidden Books in 1912.

The London The Tablet said,

By his rigid application of scientific methods of research and judgment, by his caustic tongue and pen, Mgr. Duchesne was regarded by some as a scoffer and a vandal among pious traditions. But by those who knew him, he was regarded as a master of the sciences which are auxiliary to ecclesiastical history.

He died in 1922, in Rome, and is buried in the cemetery of Saint-Servan.

== Works ==
- Mémoire sur une mission au mont Athos (Paris: E. Thorin, 1876)
- Les Nouveaux textes de Saint Clément de Rome, 1877
- De codicibus MSS Graecis Pii II in bibliotheca Alexandrino-Vaticana, Paris 1880
- Origines du culte chrétien: etude sur la liturgie latine avant Charlemagne (1889)
- Christian worship : its origin and evolution : a study of the Latin liturgy up to the time of Charlemagne. M.L. McClure (transl.). London: Society for Promoting Christian Knowledge. 1903. p. 557.. Next printing 1919 and 1931 (5th ed.) also in New York : Macmillan Company.
- The churches separated from Rome. Arnold Harris Mathew (trans.). K. Paul, Trench, Trübner & co. ltd. 1907. p. 224.
- Duchesne, Louis (1907). Fastes épiscopaux de l'ancienne Gaule: I. Provinces du Sud-Est. Paris: Fontemoing. second edition (in French)
- Early history of the Christian church from its foundation to the end of the third century. Vol. 1–2. London: J. Murray. 1909. p. 428. Vol. III
- Duchesne, Louis (1910). Fastes épiscopaux de l'ancienne Gaule: II. L'Aquitaine et les Lyonnaises. Paris: Fontemoing. second edition (in French)
- Duchesne, Louis (1910). Fastes épiscopaux de l'ancienne Gaule: III. Paris: Fontemoing. second edition (in French)
- Scripta minora : études de topographie romaine et de géographie ecclésiastique. Rome: École française de Rome. 1973. - commemorating the 50th anniversary of the death of Louis Duchesne.

== Gallery ==
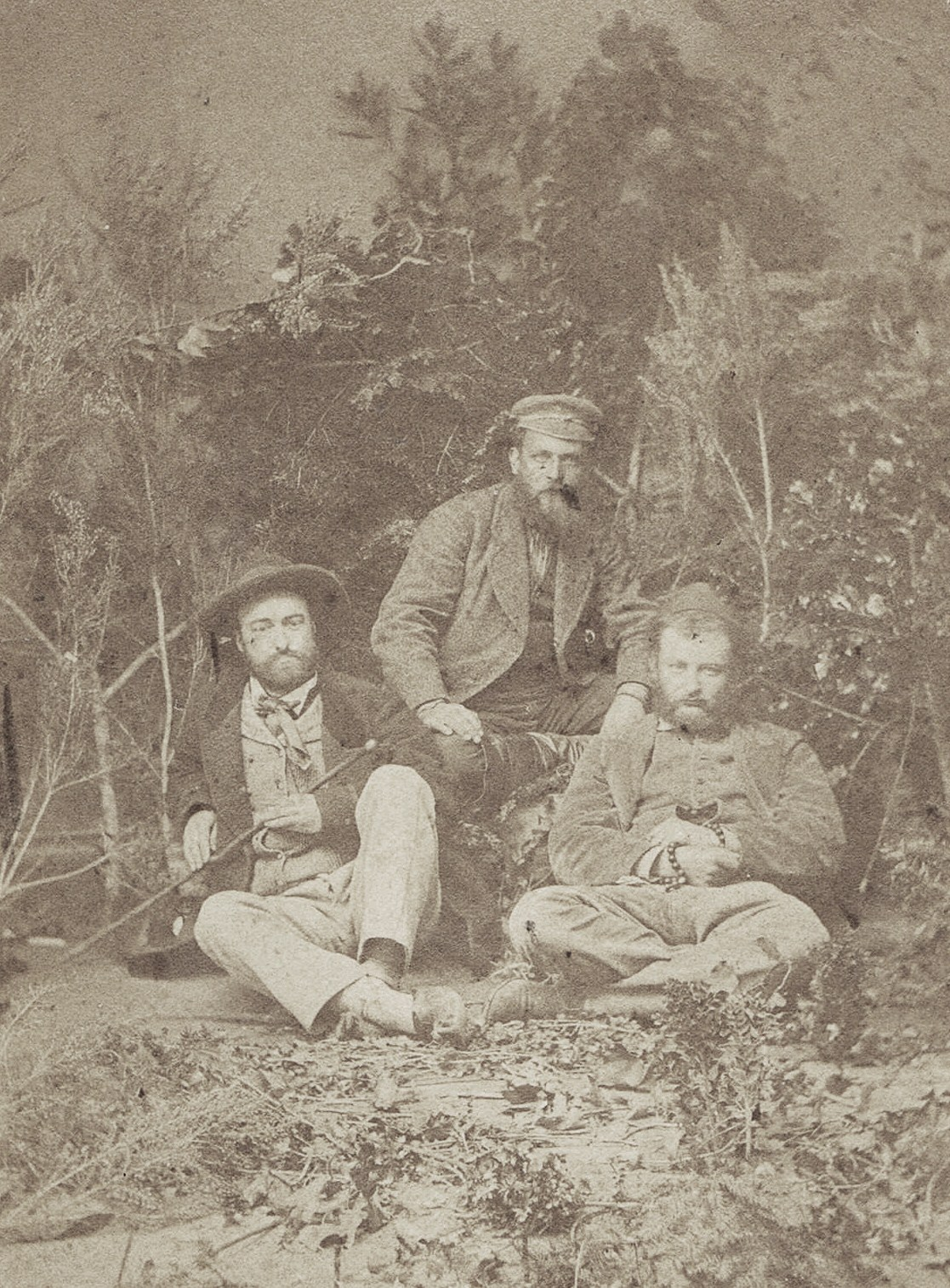
Duchesne, left, in Turquey.

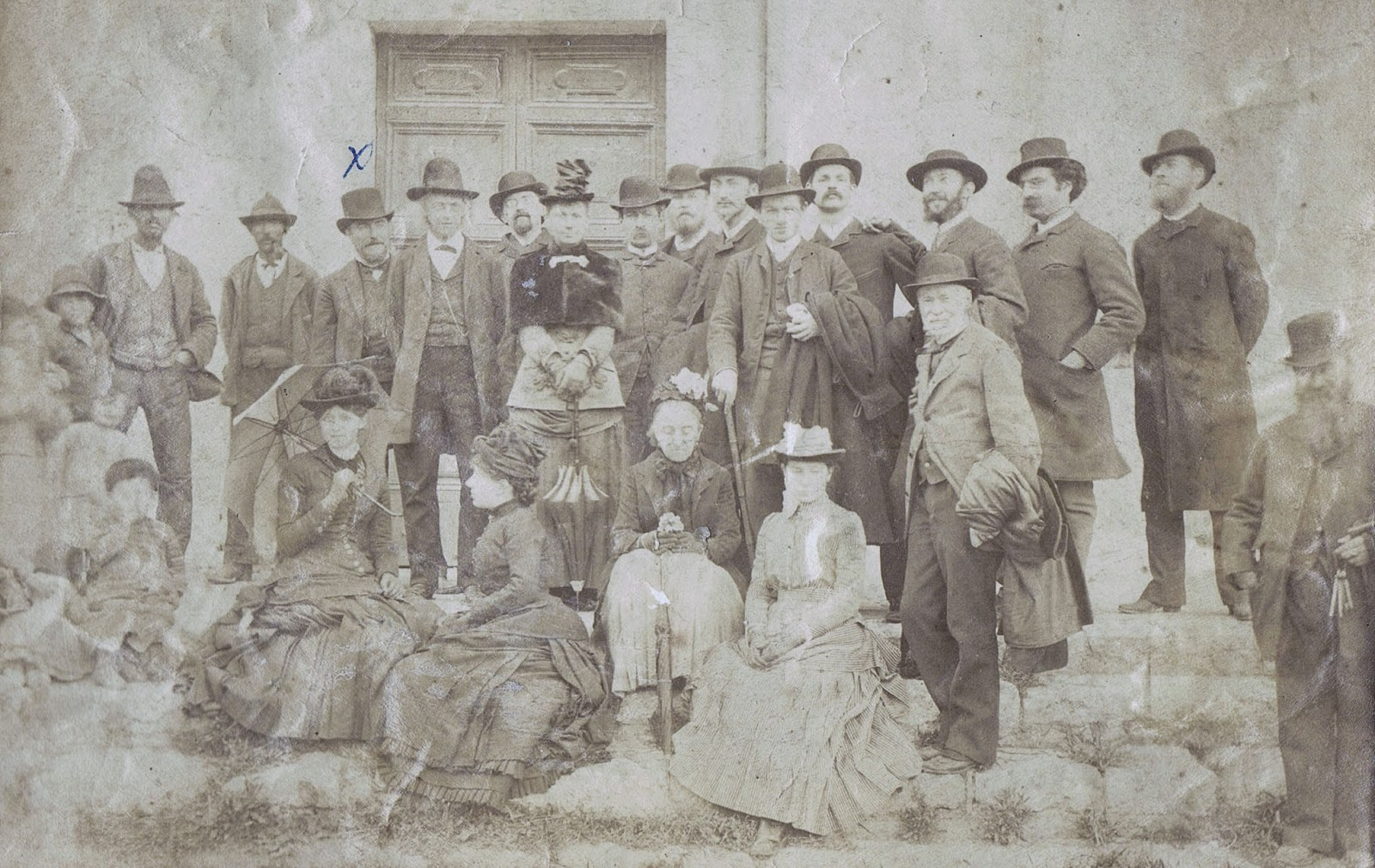
Duchesne (below the cross) at Tarquinia, April 1885

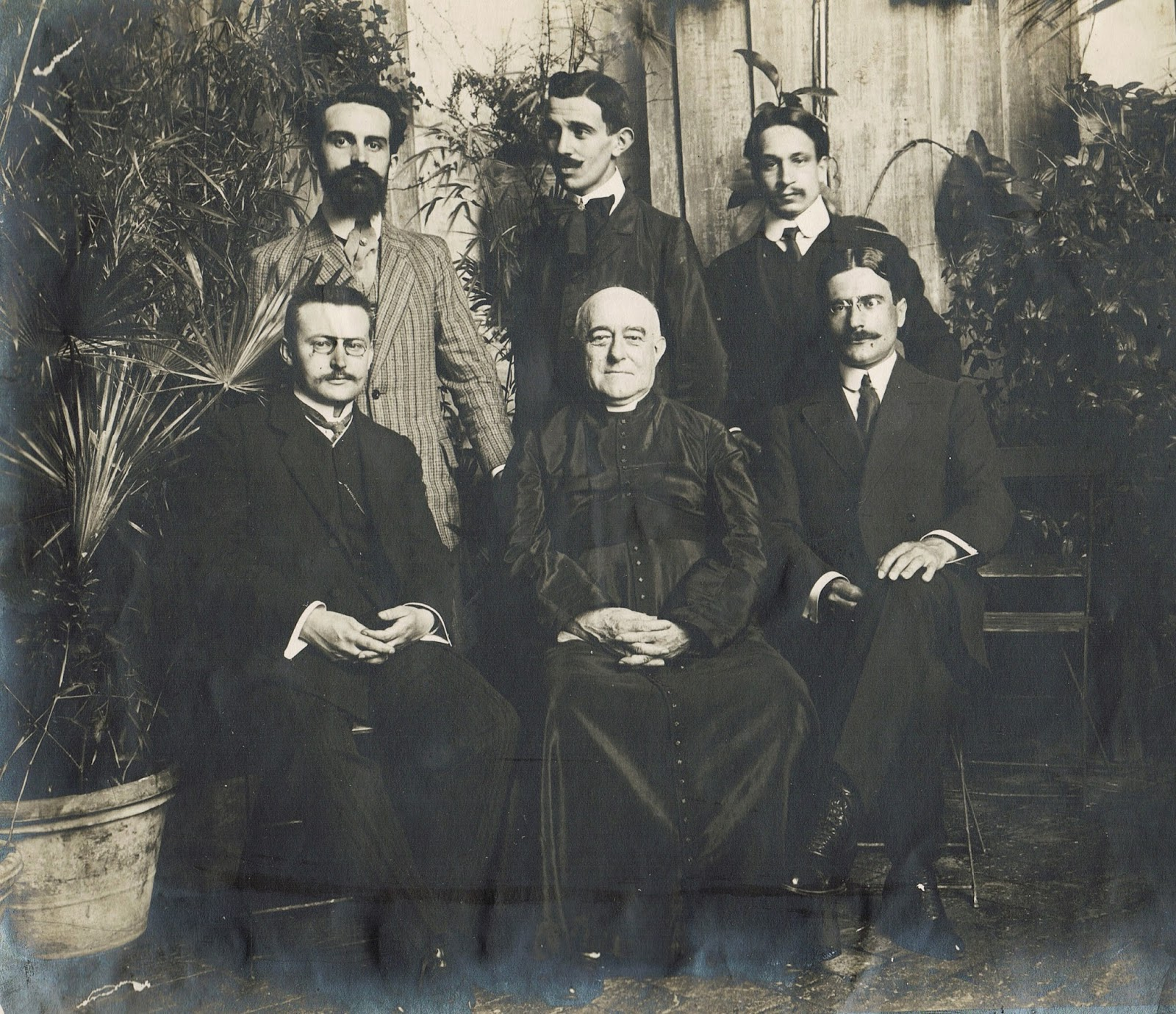
Duchesne, as Director of the École française de Rome, with his students

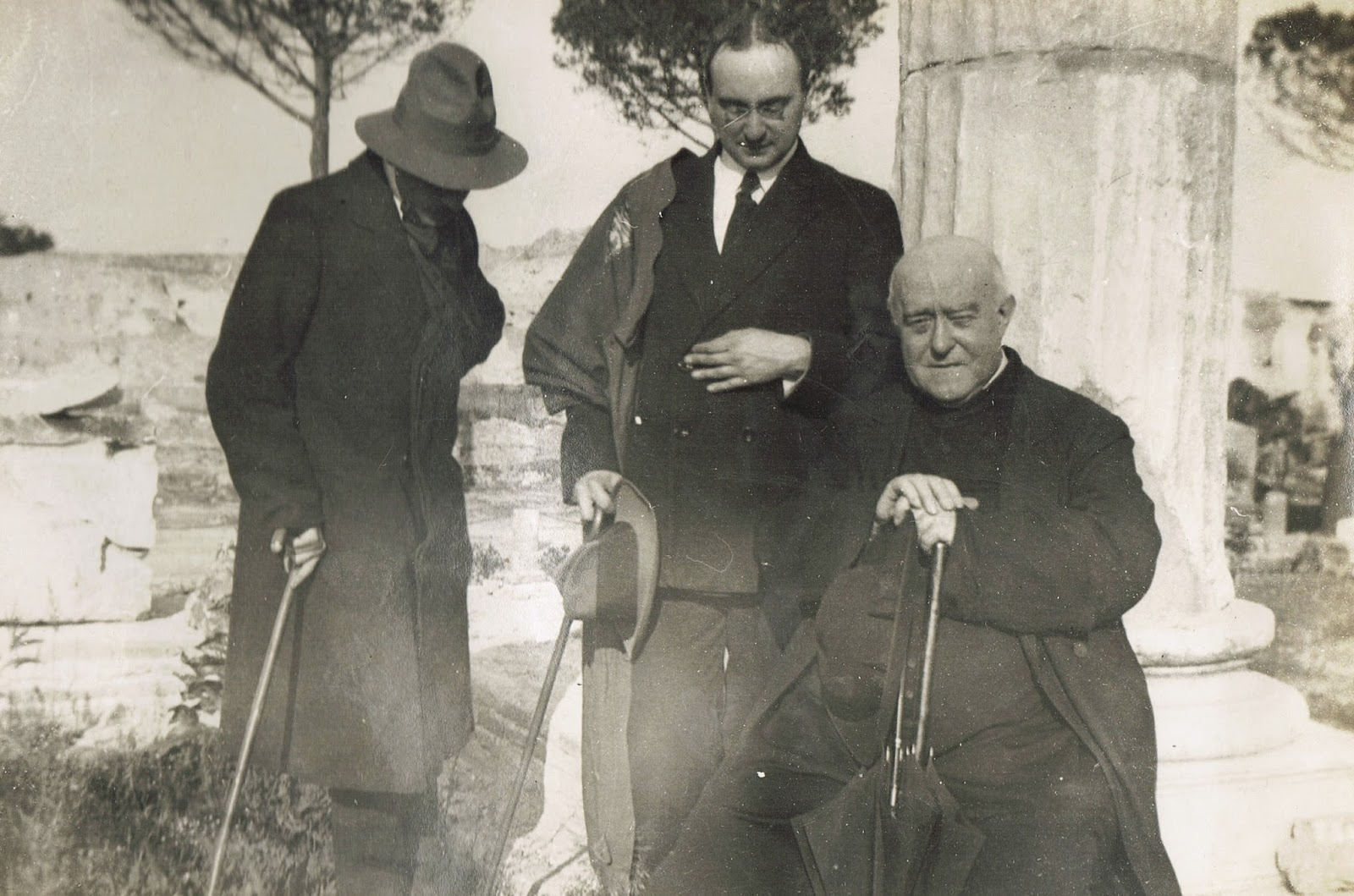
Louis Canet, Jean Marx and Duchesne, in Rome

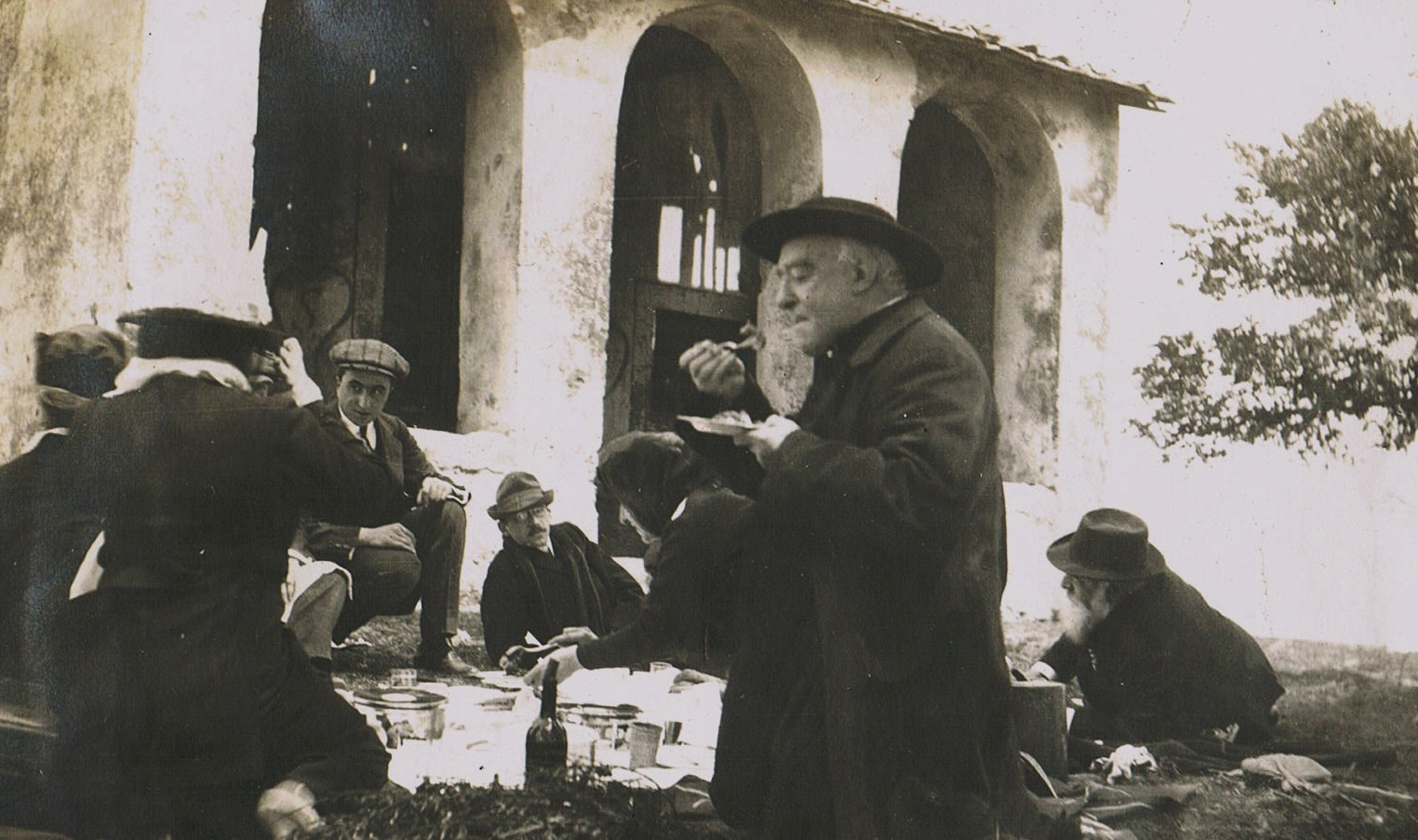
Duchesne, in front, with Louis Canet, in the hat

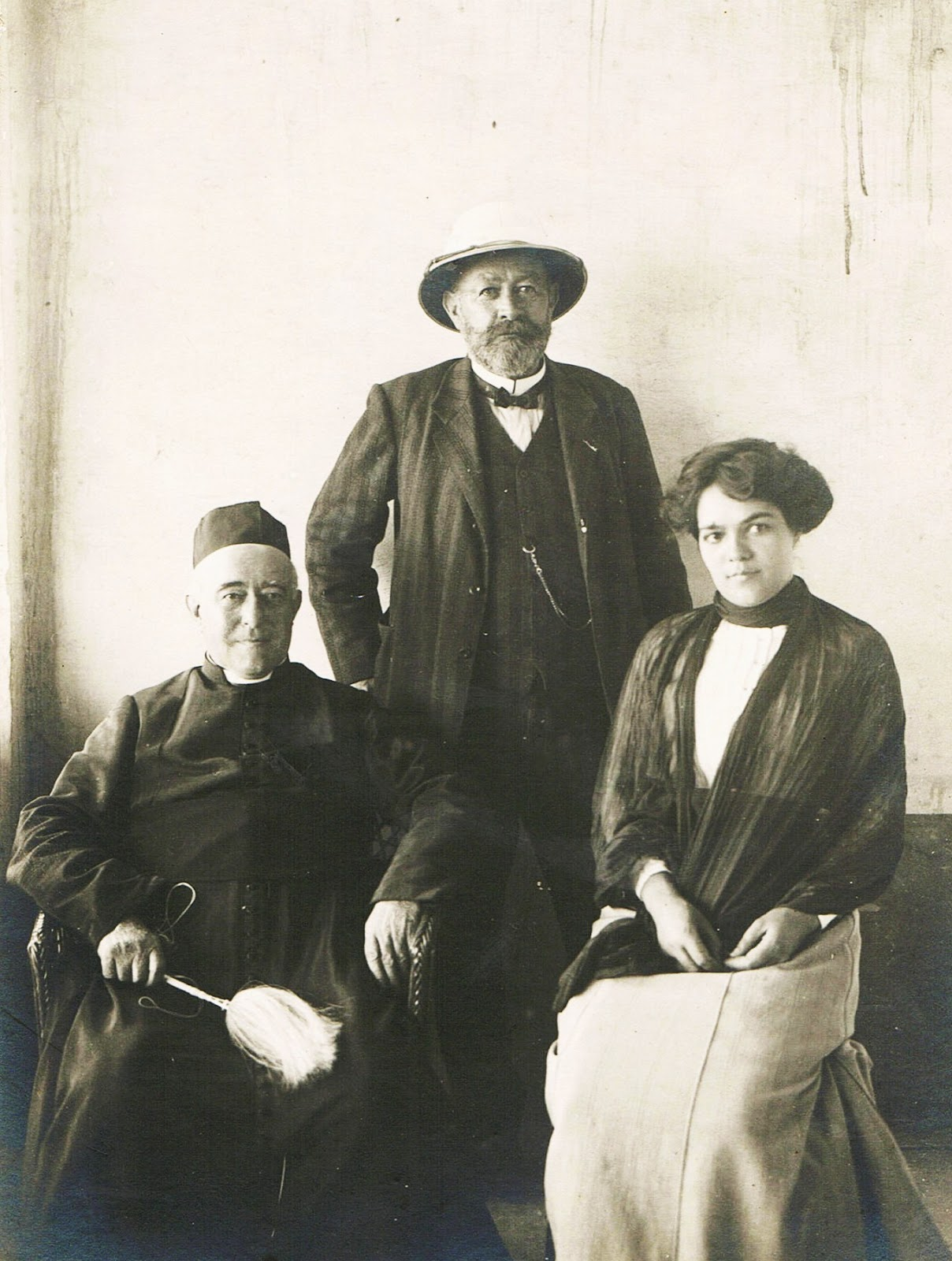
Duchesne, left, in Auguste Mariette's house, in Cairo

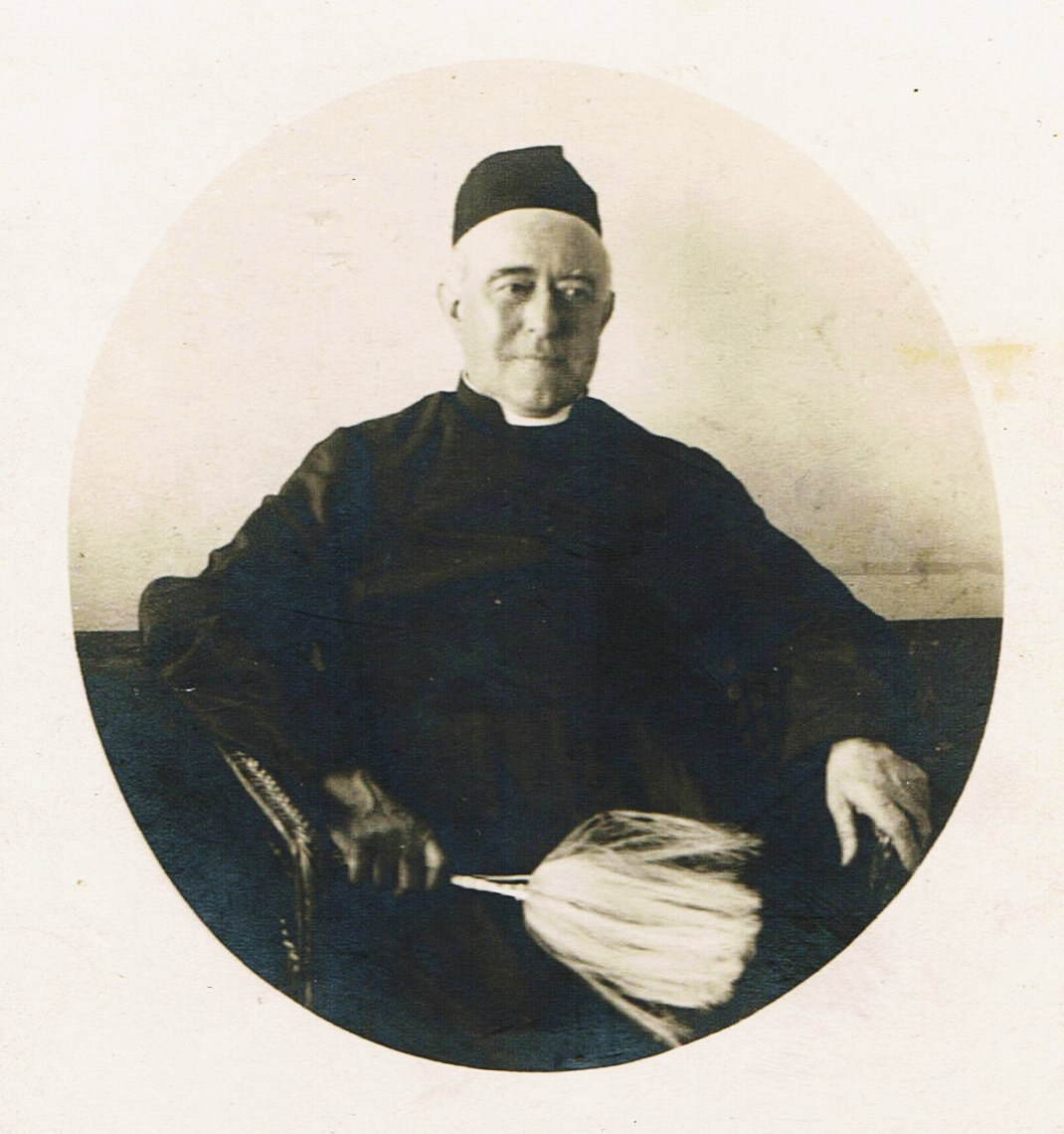
Duchesne, as Director of the Institut Français d'Archéologie Orientale du Caire, in 1912

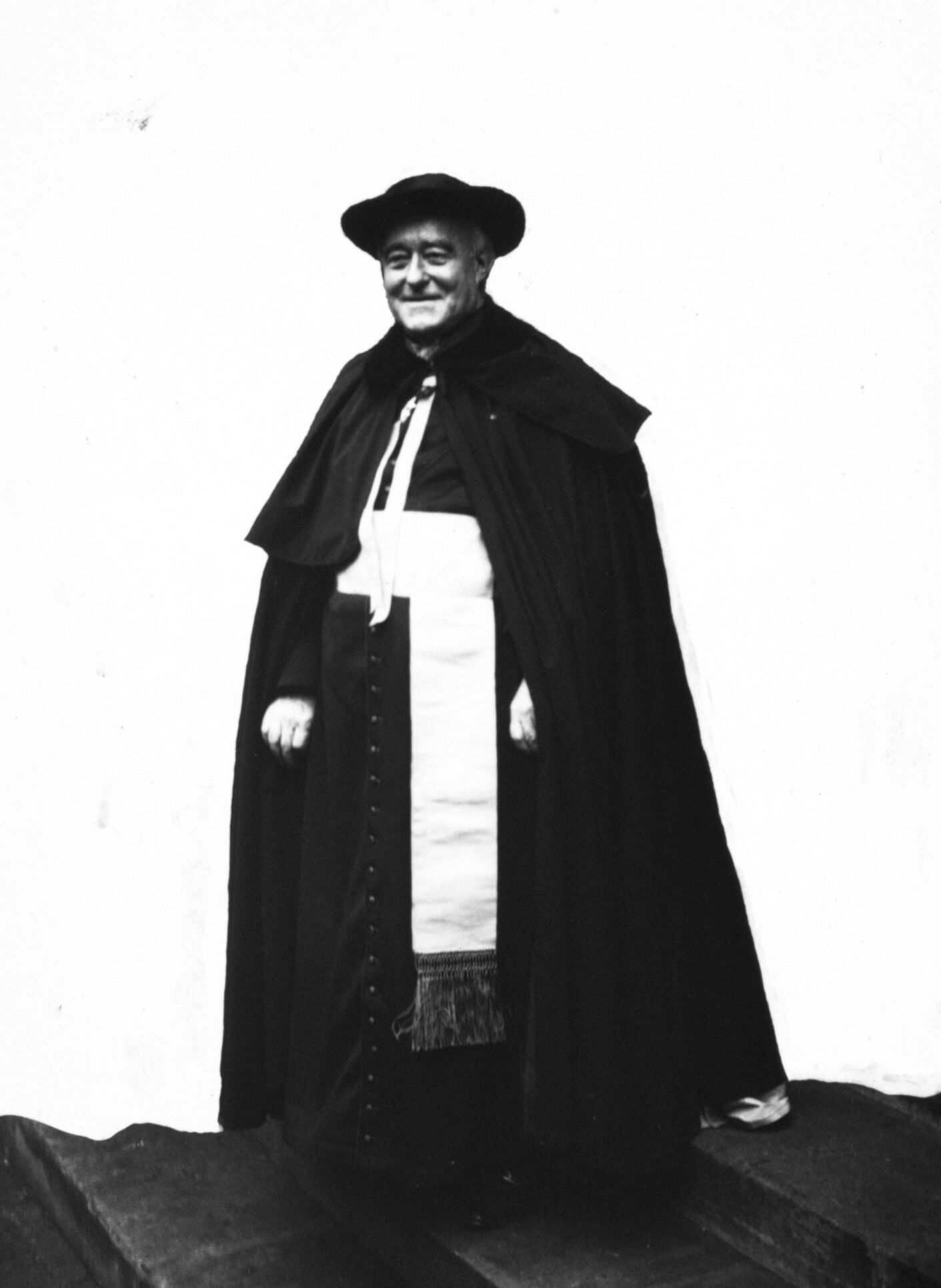
Duchesne in 1911.
