= Pine Camp Tuberculosis Hospital =

Former tuberculosis hospital in Virginia, United States

- U.S. National Register of Historic Places
- Virginia Landmarks Register
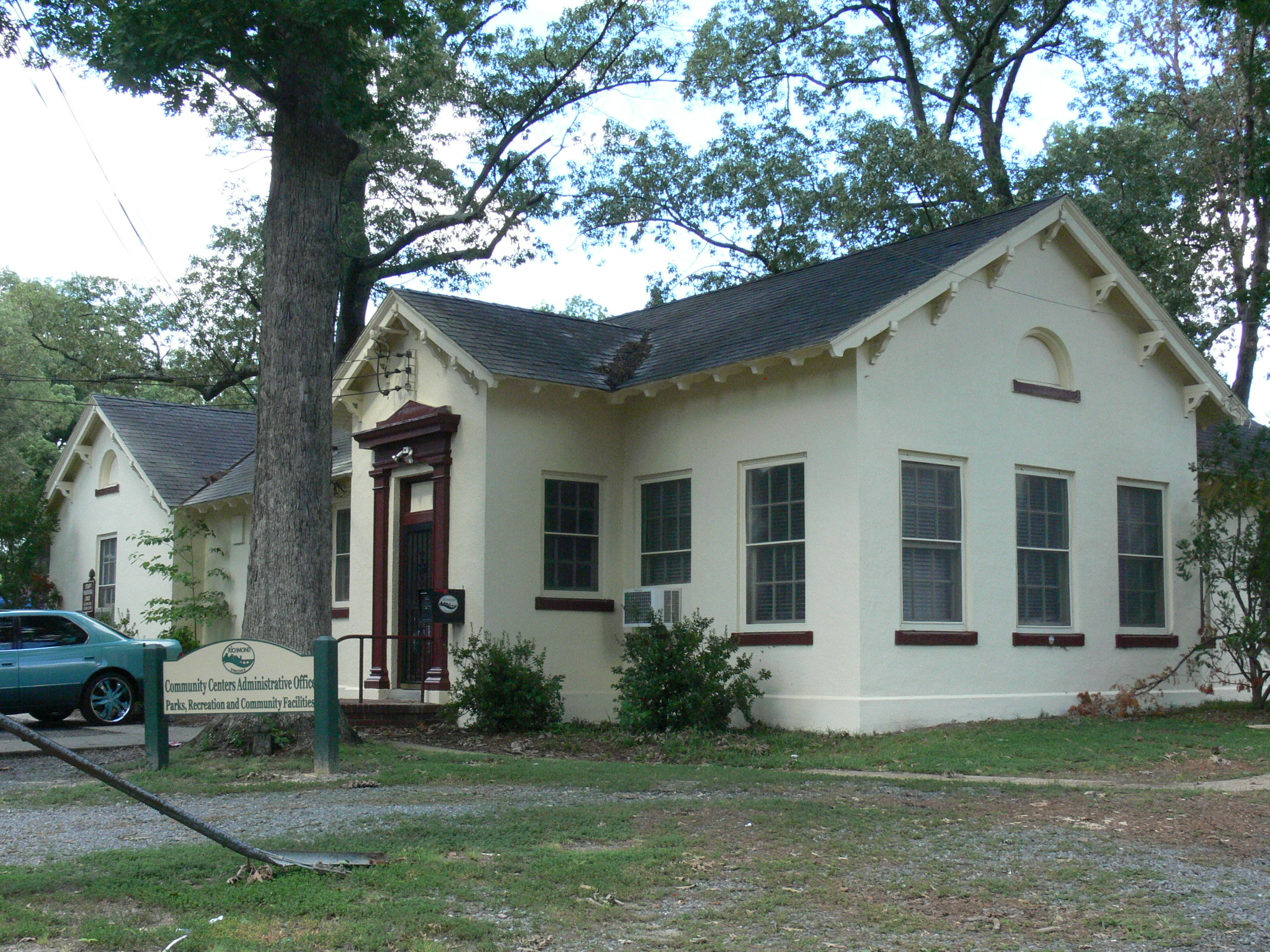
- Pine Camp Tuberculosis Hospital, July 2011

- Location within Virginia Location within the United States
- Location: 4901 Old Brook Rd., Richmond, Virginia
- Coordinates: 37°35′57″N 77°26′42″W
- Area: 110 acres (45 ha)
- Built: 1917
- Architectural style: Classical Revival
- NRHP reference No.: 03000190
- VLR No.: 127-0829

Significant dates
- Added to NRHP: April 4, 2003
- Designated VLR: December 4, 2002

Pine Camp Tuberculosis Hospital is a historic hospital complex located in Richmond, Virginia. Opened originally as the Pine Camp Home for Consumptives in 1910, over time the original structures were replaced with a two-story Central Building and a one-story, Bungalow-style Administration Building, both built in 1932. Both buildings are constructed of structural tile covered with plaster. Also on the property is a contributing one-story, stuccoed masonry laundry and garage building (1922). After 1957 the property was converted for use as a recreation center.

The site was listed on the National Register of Historic Places in 2003.
