= Liber Pontificalis =

Book of biographies of popes

- "The Book of Pontiffs"
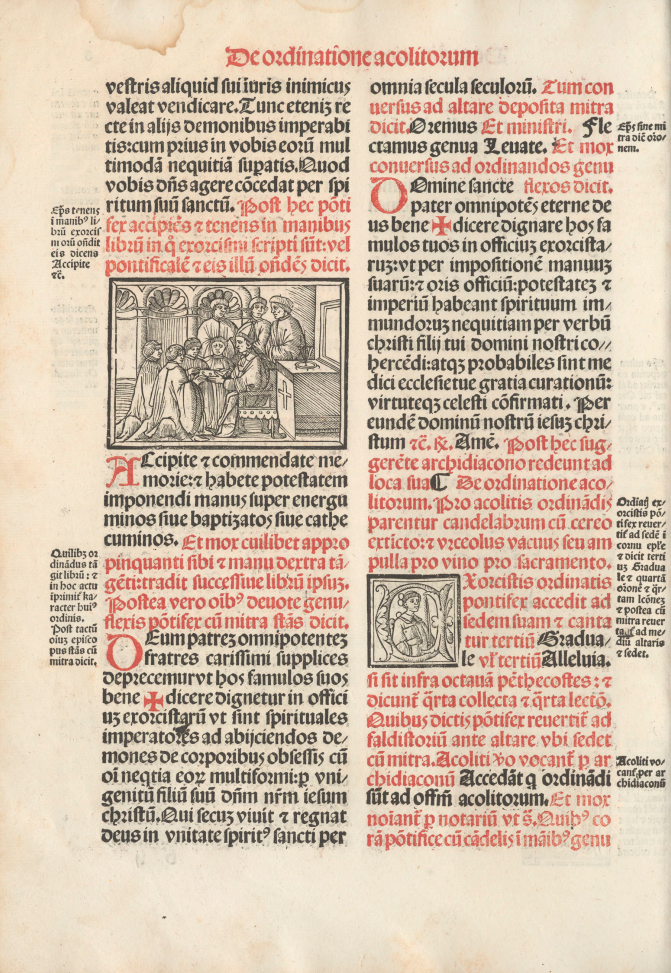
- A page from a 16th-century copy of Liber Pontificalis.
- Also known as: Liber episcopalis in quo continentur acta beatorum pontificum Urbis Romae; Gesta pontificum; Chronica pontificum
- Author(s): largely anonymous, but contributors include Martin of Opava
- Ascribed to: Jerome for the first chapters up to Damasus I
- Language: Latin
- Date: started in the 3rd century as list of bishops; continued as biographical series at various stages between the 6th and 9th century, and between c. 1100 and the 15th century.
- First printed edition: J. Busæus, Anastasii bibliothecarii Vitæ seu Gesta. Romanorum Pontificum (Mainz, 1602).
- Genre: biography of the popes
- Period covered: from St. Peter (1st century) to the 15th century.

The Liber Pontificalis (Latin for 'pontifical book' or Book of the Popes) is a book of biographies of popes from Saint Peter until the 15th century. The original publication of the Liber Pontificalis stopped with Pope Adrian II (867–872) or Pope Stephen V (885–891), but it was later supplemented in a different style until Pope Eugene IV (1431–1447) and then Pope Pius II (1458–1464). Although quoted virtually uncritically from the 8th to 18th centuries, the Liber Pontificalis has undergone intense modern scholarly scrutiny. The work of the French priest Louis Duchesne (who compiled the major scholarly edition), and of others has highlighted some of the underlying redactional motivations of different sections, though such interests are so disparate and varied as to render improbable one populariser's claim that it is an "unofficial instrument of pontifical propaganda."

The title Liber Pontificalis goes back to the 12th century, although it only became common in the 15th century, and the canonical title of the work since the edition of Duchesne in the 19th century. In the earliest extant manuscripts it is referred to as Liber episcopalis in quo continentur acta beatorum pontificum Urbis Romae ('episcopal book in which are contained the acts of the blessed pontiffs of the city of Rome') and later the Gesta or Chronica pontificum.

== Authorship ==
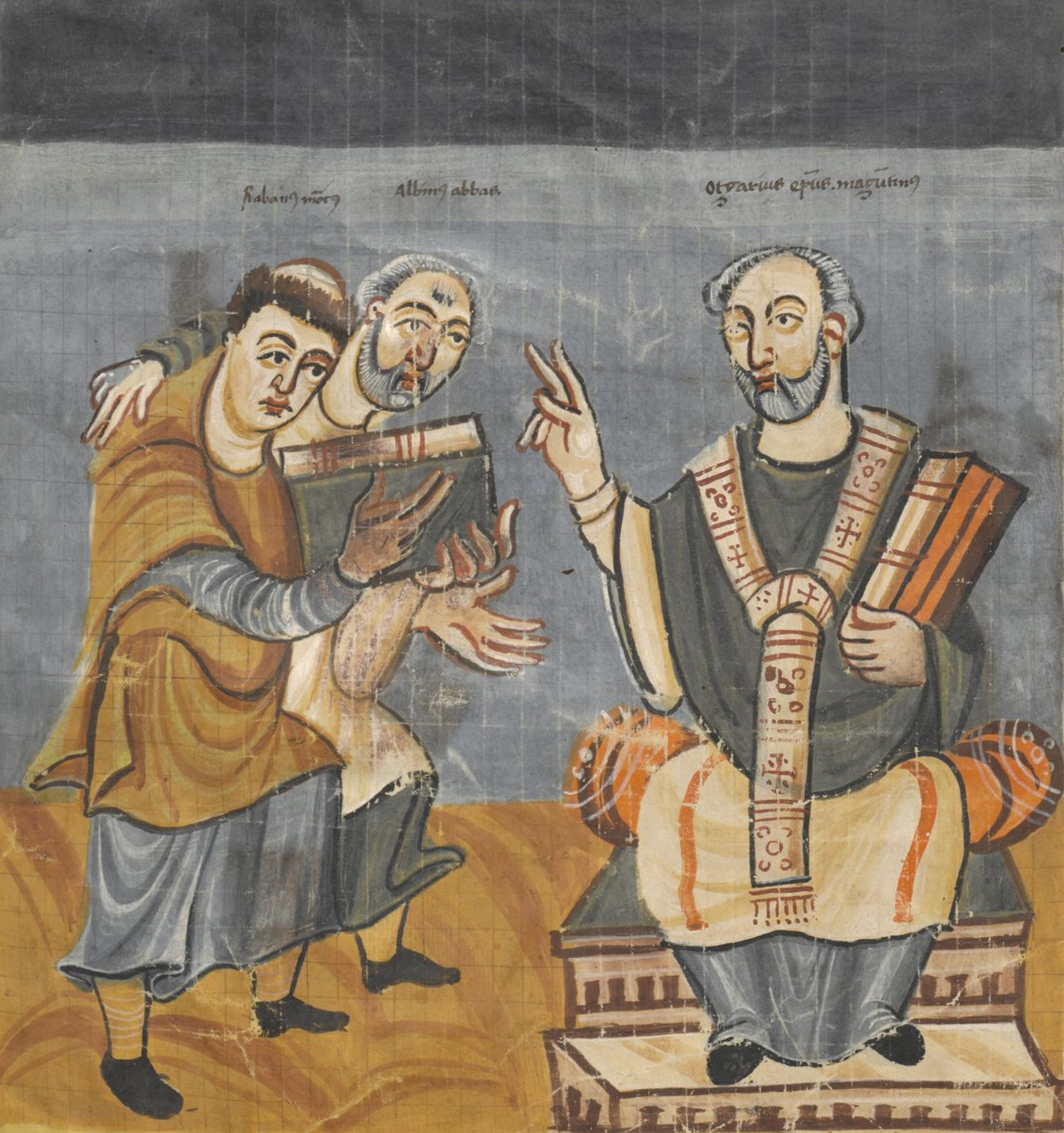
Rabanus Maurus (left) was the first to attribute the Liber Pontificalis to Saint Jerome.

During the Middle Ages, Saint Jerome was considered the author of all the biographies up until those of Pope Damasus I (366–383), based on an apocryphal letter between Saint Jerome and Pope Damasus published as a preface to the Medieval manuscripts. The attribution originated with Rabanus Maurus and is repeated by Martin of Opava, who extended the work into the 13th century. Other sources attribute the early work to Hegesippus and Irenaeus, having been continued by Eusebius of Caesarea.

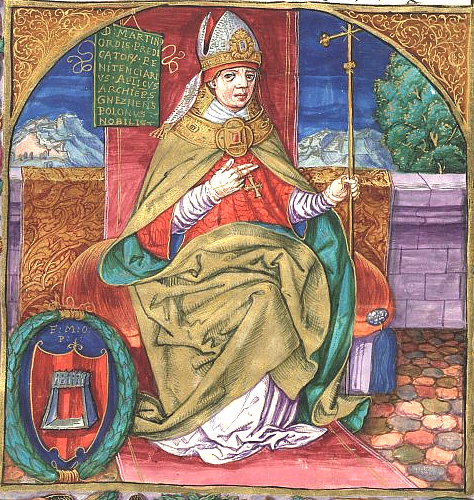
Martin of Opava continued the Liber Pontificalis into the 13th century.

In the 16th century, Onofrio Panvinio attributed the biographies after Damasus until Pope Nicholas I (858–867) to Anastasius Bibliothecarius; Anastasius continued to be cited as the author into the 17th century, although this attribution was disputed by the scholarship of Caesar Baronius, Ciampini, Schelstrate and others.

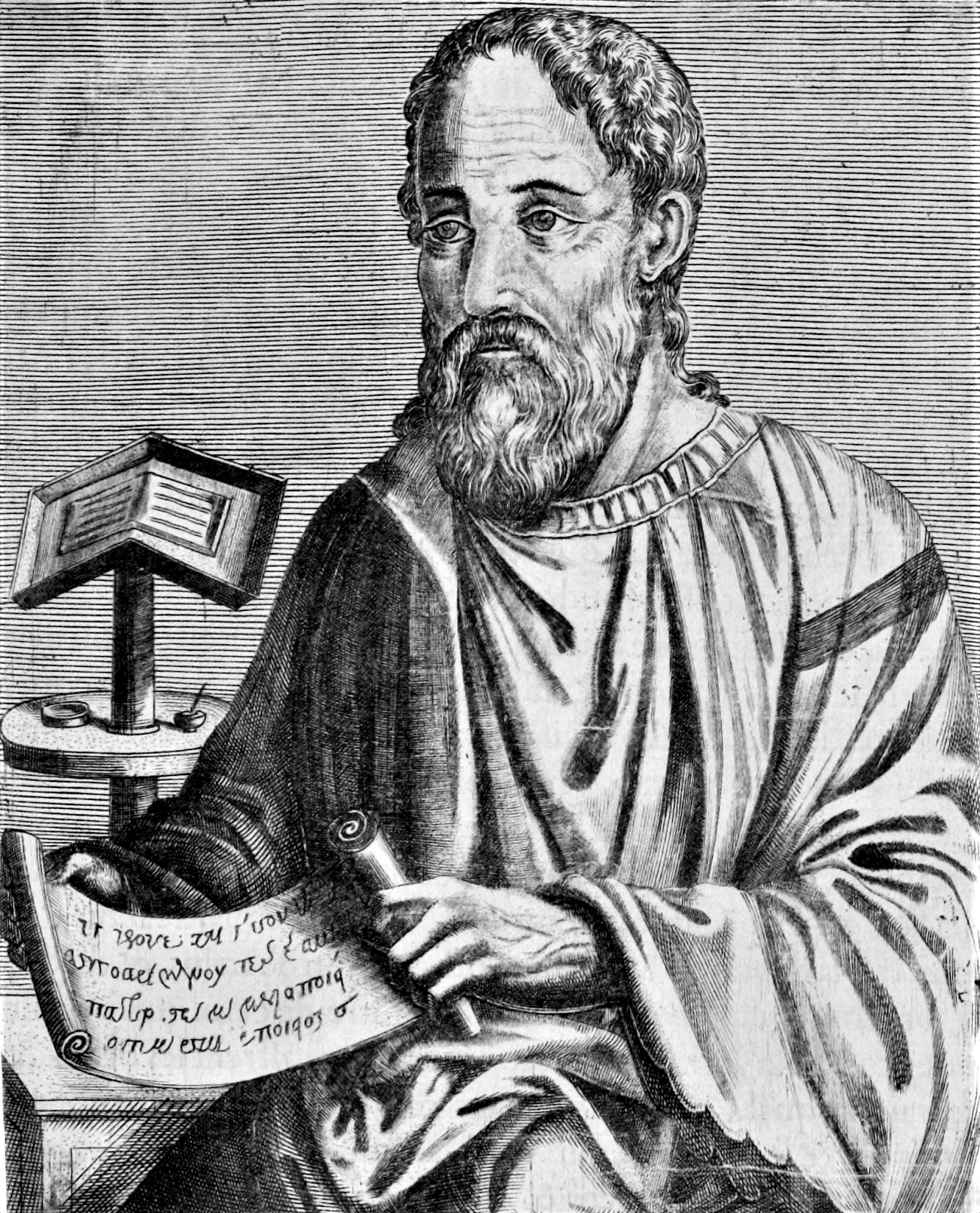
Eusebius of Caesarea may have continued the Liber Pontificalis into the 4th century.

The modern interpretation, following that of Louis Duchesne, is that the Liber Pontificalis was gradually and unsystematically compiled, and that the authorship is impossible to determine, with a few exceptions (e.g. the biography of Pope Stephen II (752–757) to papal "Primicerius" Christopher; the biographies of Pope Nicholas I and Pope Adrian II (867–872) to Anastasius). Duchesne and others have viewed the beginning of the Liber Pontificalis up until the biographies of Pope Felix III (483–492) as the work of a single author, who was a contemporary of Pope Anastasius II (496–498), relying on Catalogus Liberianus, which in turn draws from the papal catalogue of Hippolytus of Rome, and the Leonine Catalogue, which is no longer extant. Most scholars believe the Liber Pontificalis was first compiled in the 5th or 6th century.

Because of the use of the vestiarium, the records of the papal treasury, some have hypothesised that the author of the early Liber Pontificalis was a clerk of the papal treasury. Edward Gibbon's Decline and Fall of the Roman Empire (1788) summarised the scholarly consensus as being that the Liber Pontificalis was composed by "apostolic librarians and notaries of the viii^{th} and ix^{th} centuries" with only the most recent portion being composed by Anastasius.

Duchesne and others believe that the author of the first addition to the Liber Pontificalis was a contemporary of Pope Silverius (536–537), and that the author of another (not necessarily the second) addition was a contemporary of Pope Conon (686–687), with later popes being added individually and during their reigns or shortly after their deaths.

== Content ==
The Liber Pontificalis originally only contained the names of the bishops of Rome and the durations of their pontificates. As enlarged in the 6th century, each biography consists of: the birth name of the pope and that of his father, place of birth, profession before elevation, length of pontificate, historical notes of varying thoroughness, major theological pronouncements and decrees, administrative milestones (including building campaigns, especially of Roman churches), ordinations, date of death, place of burial, and the duration of the ensuing sede vacante.

Pope Adrian II (867–872) is the last pope for which there are extant manuscripts of the original Liber Pontificalis: the biographies of Pope John VIII, Pope Marinus I, and Pope Adrian III are missing and the biography of Pope Stephen V (885–891) is incomplete. From Stephen V through the 10th and 11th centuries, the historical notes are extremely abbreviated, usually with only the pope's origin and reign duration.

== Extension ==
It was only in the 12th century that the Liber Pontificalis was systematically continued, although papal biographies exist in the interim period in other sources.

=== Petrus Guillermi ===
Duchesne refers to the 12th-century work by Petrus Guillermi in 1142 at the monastery of St. Gilles (Diocese of Reims) as the Liber Pontificalis of Petrus Guillermi (son of William). Guillermi's version is mostly copied from other works with small additions or excisions from the papal biographies of Pandulf, nephew of Hugo of Alatri, which in turn was copied almost verbatim from the original Liber Pontificalis (with the notable exception of the biography of Pope Leo IX), then from other sources until Pope Honorius II (1124–1130), and with contemporary information from Pope Paschal II (1099–1118) to Pope Urban II (1088–1099).

Duchesne attributes all biographies from Pope Gregory VII to Urban II to Pandulf, while earlier historians like Giesebrecht and Watterich attributed the biographies of Gregory VII, Victor III, and Urban II to Petrus Pisanus, and the subsequent biographies to Pandulf. These biographies until those of Pope Martin IV (1281–1285) are extant only as revised by Petrus Guillermi in the manuscripts of the monastery of St. Gilles having been taken from the Chronicle of Martin of Opava.

Early in the 14th century, an unknown author built upon the continuation of Petrus Guillermi, adding the biographies of popes Martin IV (d. 1285) through John XXII (1316–1334), with information taken from the "Chronicon Pontificum" of Bernardus Guidonis, stopping abruptly in 1328.

=== Boso ===
Independently, the cardinal-nephew of Pope Adrian IV, Cardinal Boso intended to extend the Liber Pontificalis from where it left off with Stephen V, although his work was only published posthumously as the Gesta Romanorum Pontificum alongside the Liber Censuum of Pope Honorius III. Boso drew on Bonizo of Sutri for popes from John XII to Gregory VII, and wrote from his own experiences about the popes from Gelasius II (1118–1119) to Alexander III (1179–1181).

=== Western Schism ===
An independent continuation appeared in the reign of Pope Eugene IV (1431–1447), appending biographies from Pope Urban V (1362–1370) to Pope Martin V (1417–1431), encompassing the period of the Western Schism. A later recension of this continuation was expanded under Pope Eugene IV.

=== 15th century ===
The two collections of papal biographies of the 15th century remain independent, although they may have been intended to be continuations of the Liber Pontificalis. The first extends from popes Benedict XII (1334–1342) to Martin V (1417–1431), or in one manuscript to Eugene IV (1431–1447). The second extends from Pope Urban VI (1378–1389) to Pope Pius II (1458–1464).

== Editions ==
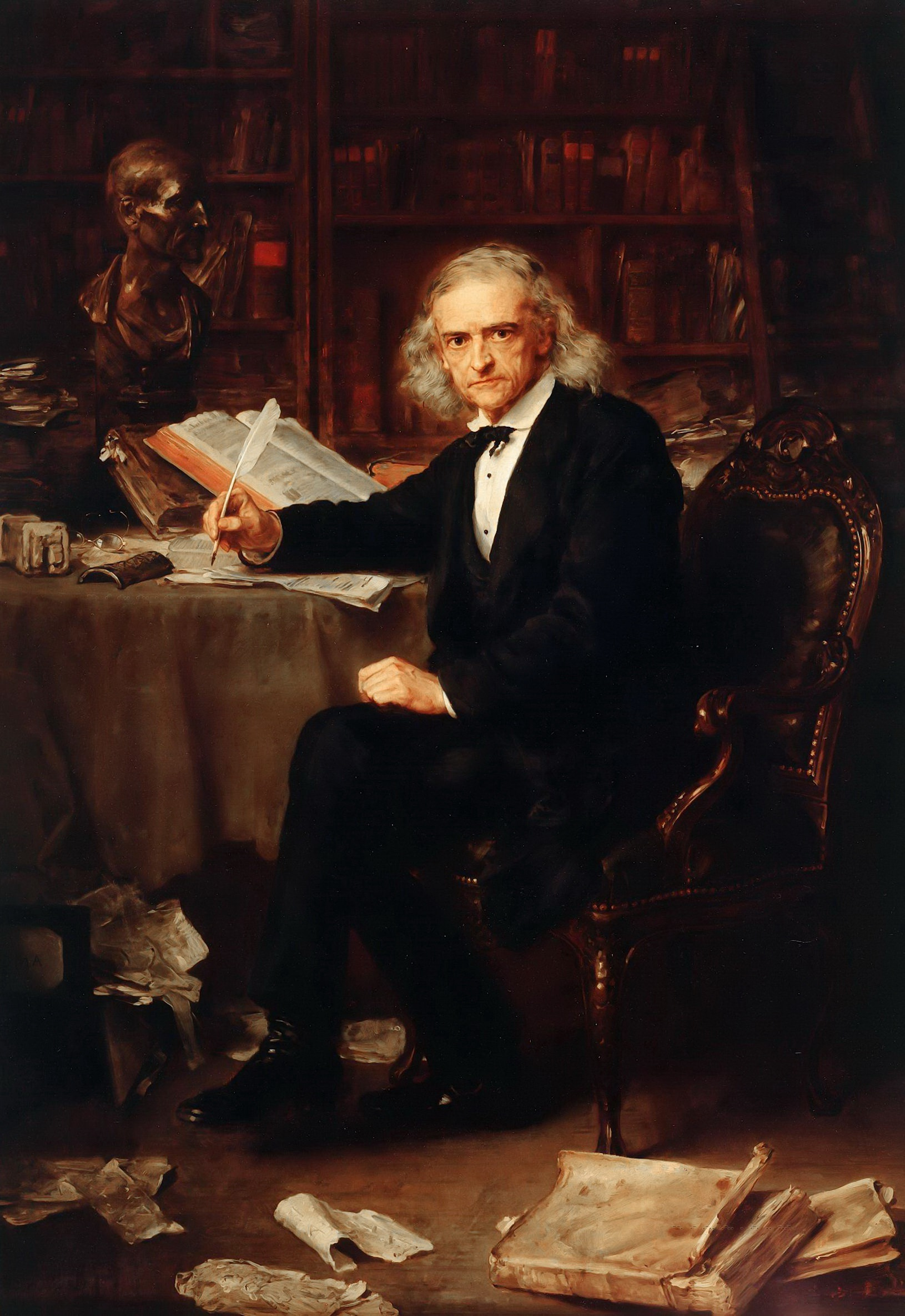
Theodor Mommsen's 1898 edition of the Liber Pontificalis terminates in 715.

The Liber Pontificalis was first edited by Joannes Busaeus under the title Anastasii bibliothecarii Vitæ seu Gesta Romanorum Pontificum (Mainz, 1602). A new edition, including the Historia ecclesiastica of Anastasius, was edited by Fabrotti (Paris, 1647). Another edition, editing the older Liber Pontificalis up to Pope Adrian II and adding Pope Stephen VI, was compiled by Fr. Bianchini (4 vols., Rome, 1718–35; a projected fifth volume did not appear). Muratori reprinted Bianchini's edition, adding the remaining popes through John XXII (Scriptores rerum Italicarum, III). Migne also republished Bianchini's edition, adding several appendixes (P. L., cxxvii–cxxviii).

Modern editions include those of Louis Duchesne (Liber Pontificalis. Texte, introduction et commentaire, 2 vols., Paris, 1886–92) and Theodor Mommsen (Gestorum Pontificum Romanorum pars I: Liber Pontificalis, Mon. Germ. hist., Berlin, 1898). Duchesne incorporates the Annales Romani (1044–1187) into his edition of the Liber Pontificalis, which otherwise relies on the two earliest known recensions of the work (530 and 687). Mommsen's edition is incomplete, extending only until 715. Translations and further commentaries appeared throughout the 20th century.

== See also ==
- List of popes

== Editions ==
- Davis, Raymond. The Book of Pontiffs (Liber Pontificalis). Liverpool: University of Liverpool Press, 1989. ISBN 0-85323-216-4. An English translation for general use, but not including scholarly notes.
  - Davis, Raymond. The Book of Pontiffs (Liber Pontificalis). Second Edition. Liverpool: University of Liverpool Press, 2000. ISBN 0-85323-545-7. Stops with Pope Constantine, 708–15; contains an extensive and up to date bibliography,
  - Davis, Raymond. "The Lives of the Eighth Century Popes." Liverpool: University of Liverpool Press, 1992. From 715 to 817.
  - Davis, Raymond. "The Lives of the Ninth Century Popes" Liverpool: University of Liverpool Press, 1989. From 817 to 891.
