= Annales Romani =

The Annales Romani are a set of annals covering the history of the city of Rome in the 11th–12th centuries, with entries for the years 1044–1073, 1100–1121 and 1182–1187. The earlier periods correspond to the periods of the Gregorian Reform and the Investiture Controversy, and the Annales thus form an important source on those events. David Whitton remarks that "no historian of eleventh and early twelfth century Rome or of the Reform Papacy can advance very far in his studies without giving attention to the Annales Romani." The Annales are rich in detail, although their reliability has been questioned. Only Bonizo of Sutri's Liber ad amicum is comparable for the history of the city in this period. According to Mary Stroll, they are sometimes melodramatic and typically "riddled with errors", but "one can still glean valuable information" from them.

Louis Duchesne argued that the surviving annals are fragments of a once continuous narrative. Ludwig Bethmann believed that the 1044–1073 series was originally a separate piece of pro-imperial and pro-Guibert propaganda.

== Editions ==
- "Annales Romani", in Georg Pertz, ed., Monumenta Germaniae Historica, Scriptores (Hanover, 1844), 5, pp. 468–480.
- "Annales Romani", in Louis Duchesne, ed., Le Liber Pontificalis (Paris, 1955), II, pp. 331–50.
